= Inagekaigan Station =

Railway station in Chiba, Japan

JE16 Inagekaigan Station 稲毛海岸駅
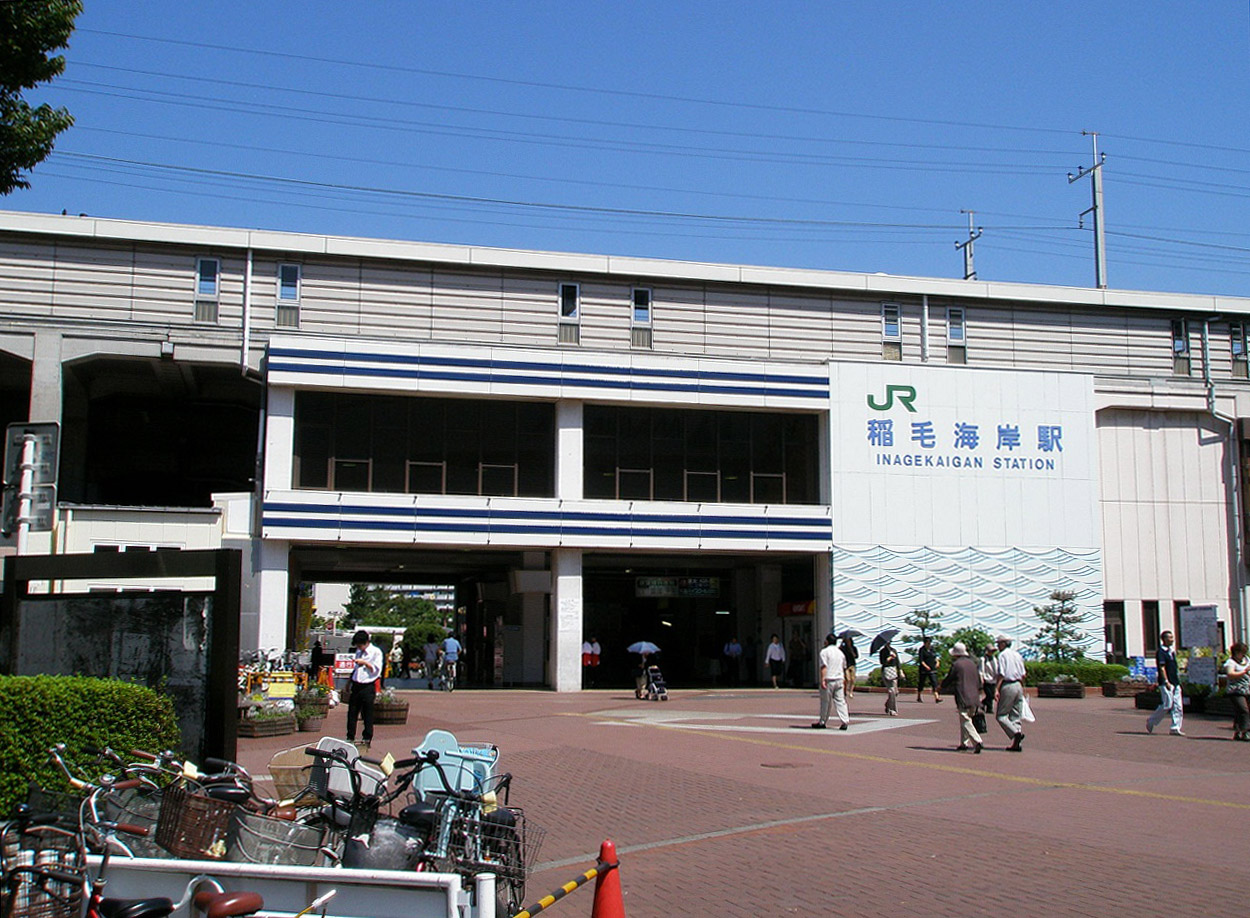
- South entrance, September 2008

General information
- Location: 3 Takasu, Mihama-ku, Chiba-shi, Chiba-ken, 261-0004; Japan
- Coordinates: 35°37′46.29″N 140°4′25.97″E
- Operator: JR East
- Line: Keiyō Line
- Connections: Bus terminal

Construction
- Structure type: Elevated
- Accessible: Yes

Other information
- Status: Staffed
- Station code: JE16
- Website: Official website

History
- Opened: 3 March 1986

Passengers
- FY2019: 21,716 daily

Services
Preceding station	JR East	Following station
Kemigawahama JE15 towards Tokyo	Keiyō Line Rapid Local	Chibaminato JE17 towards Soga
Location
- Location within Tokyo Keiyo area Location within Chiba Prefecture Location within Japan

Inagekaigan Station (稲毛海岸駅, Inage-Kaigan-eki) is a passenger railway station located in Mihama-ku, Chiba, Japan, operated by the East Japan Railway Company (JR East).

== Lines ==
Inagekaigan Station is served by the Keiyō Line from Tokyo and is 35.3 kilometers from the western terminus of the line at Tokyo Station.

== Station layout ==
The elevated station consists of two side platforms serving two tracks between them, with the station building underneath. The station is staffed.

=== Platforms ===
1	Keiyō Line	for Soga
2	Keiyō Line	for Kaihimmakuhari and Tokyo

== History ==
The station opened on 3 March 1986. The station was absorbed into the JR East network upon the privatization of JNR on 1 April 1987.

Station numbering was introduced to the JR East platforms in 2016 with Inagekaigan being assigned station number JE15. With the opening of Makuharitoyosuna in 2023, stations further down on the Keiyo Line were each shifted down one station number. As such, Inagekaigan was reassigned station number JE16.

== Passenger statistics ==
In fiscal 2019, the station was used by an average of 21,716 passengers daily

== Surrounding area ==
- Inage Seaside Park
- Tokyo Dental College Chiba campus

== See also ==
- List of railway stations in Japan
