= Shin-Narashino Station =

Railway station in Narashino, Chiba Prefecture, Japan

JE12 Shin-Narashino Station 新習志野駅
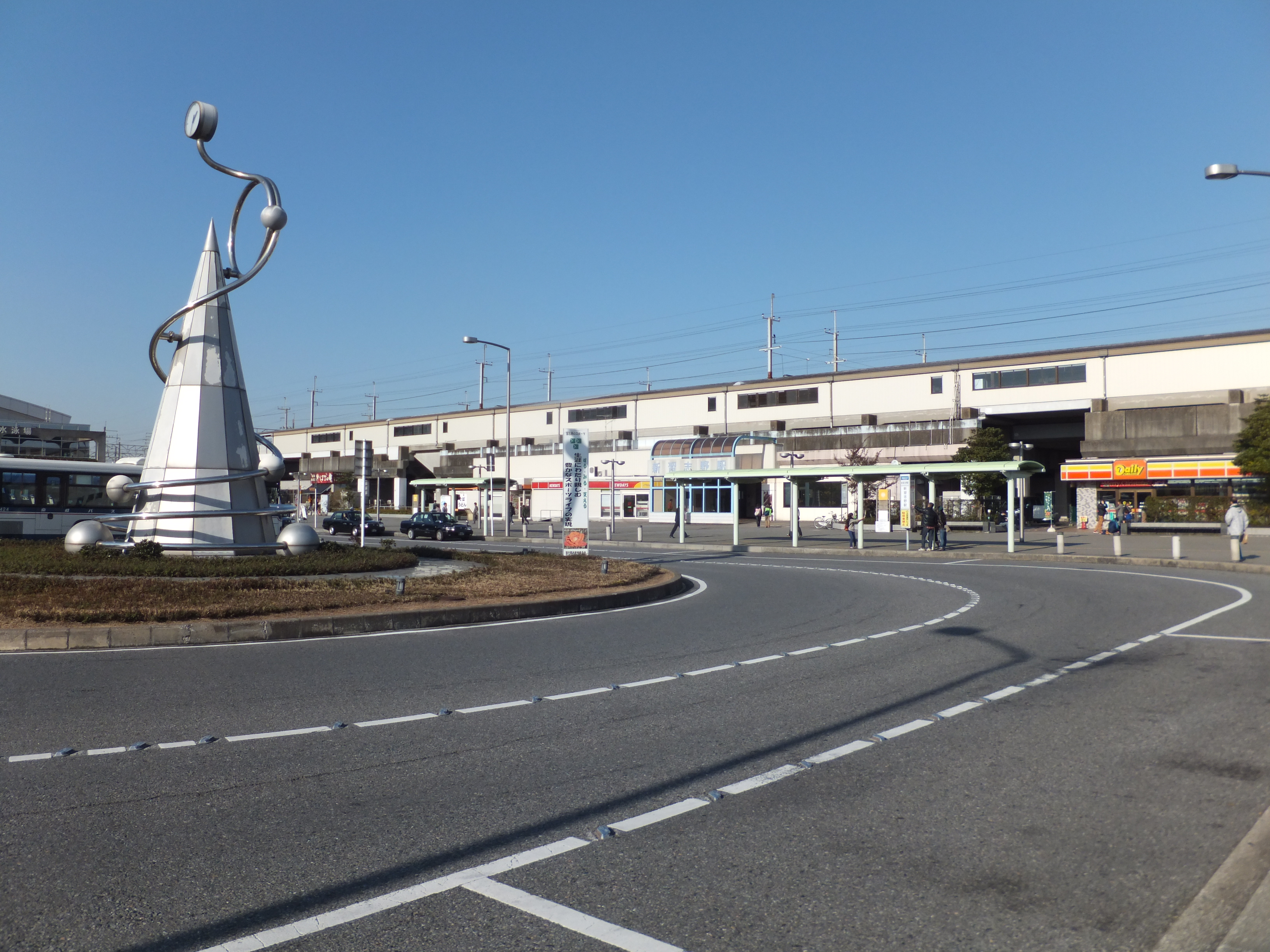
- Shin-Narashino Station in December 2013

General information
- Location: 2-1-1 Akanehama, Narashino-shi, Chiba-ken 275-0024; Japan
- Coordinates: 35°40′02.7408″N 140°0′46.85″E
- Operator: JR East
- Line: Keiyō Line
- Platforms: 1 island, 2 side platforms
- Tracks: 4

Construction
- Structure type: Elevated
- Accessible: Yes

Other information
- Status: Staffed
- Station code: JE12
- Website: Official website

History
- Opened: 3 March 1986

Passengers
- FY2019: 13,295 daily

Services
Preceding station	JR East	Following station
Minami-Funabashi JE11 towards Tokyo	Keiyō Line Local	Makuharitoyosuna JE13 towards Soga
Minami-Funabashi JE11 towards Ōmiya	Shimōsa	Makuharitoyosuna JE13 towards Kaihimmakuhari
Minami-Funabashi JE11 towards Fuchūhommachi	Musashino Line Keiyō Line through-service	Makuharitoyosuna JE13 towards Kaihimmakuhari
Location
- Location within Tokyo Keiyo area Location within Chiba Prefecture Location within Japan

Shin-Narashino Station (新習志野駅, Shin-Narashino-eki) is a passenger railway station in the city of Narashino, Chiba Prefecture, Japan, operated by the East Japan Railway Company (JR East).

== Lines ==
Shin-Narashino Station is served by the Keiyō Line and is 28.3 kilometers from the starting point of the line at Tokyo Station, and 79.5 kilometers from Fuchūhommachi Station.

== Station layout ==
Shin-Narashino Station consists of two elevated side platforms on either side of an island platform, serving four tracks in total. The station is staffed.

=== Platforms ===
1-2	Keiyō Line	for Kaihimmakuhari, Soga, Kazusa-Ichinomiya, and Kimitsu
2-4	Keiyō Line	for Maihama, Shin-Kiba, and Tokyo
2-4	Musashino Line through service	for Nishi-Funabashi, Shim-Matsudo, and Fuchūhommachi

== History ==
The station opened on 3 March 1986.

Station numbering was introduced in 2016 with Shin-Narashino being assigned station number JE12.

== Passenger statistics ==
In fiscal 2019, the station was used by an average of 13,295 passengers daily (boarding passengers only).

== Surrounding area ==
- Daiichi Cutter Field
- Toyo Engineering Corporation head office

== See also ==
- List of railway stations in Japan
