= Kemigawahama Station =

Railway station in Chiba, Japan

JE15 Kemigawahama Station 検見川浜駅
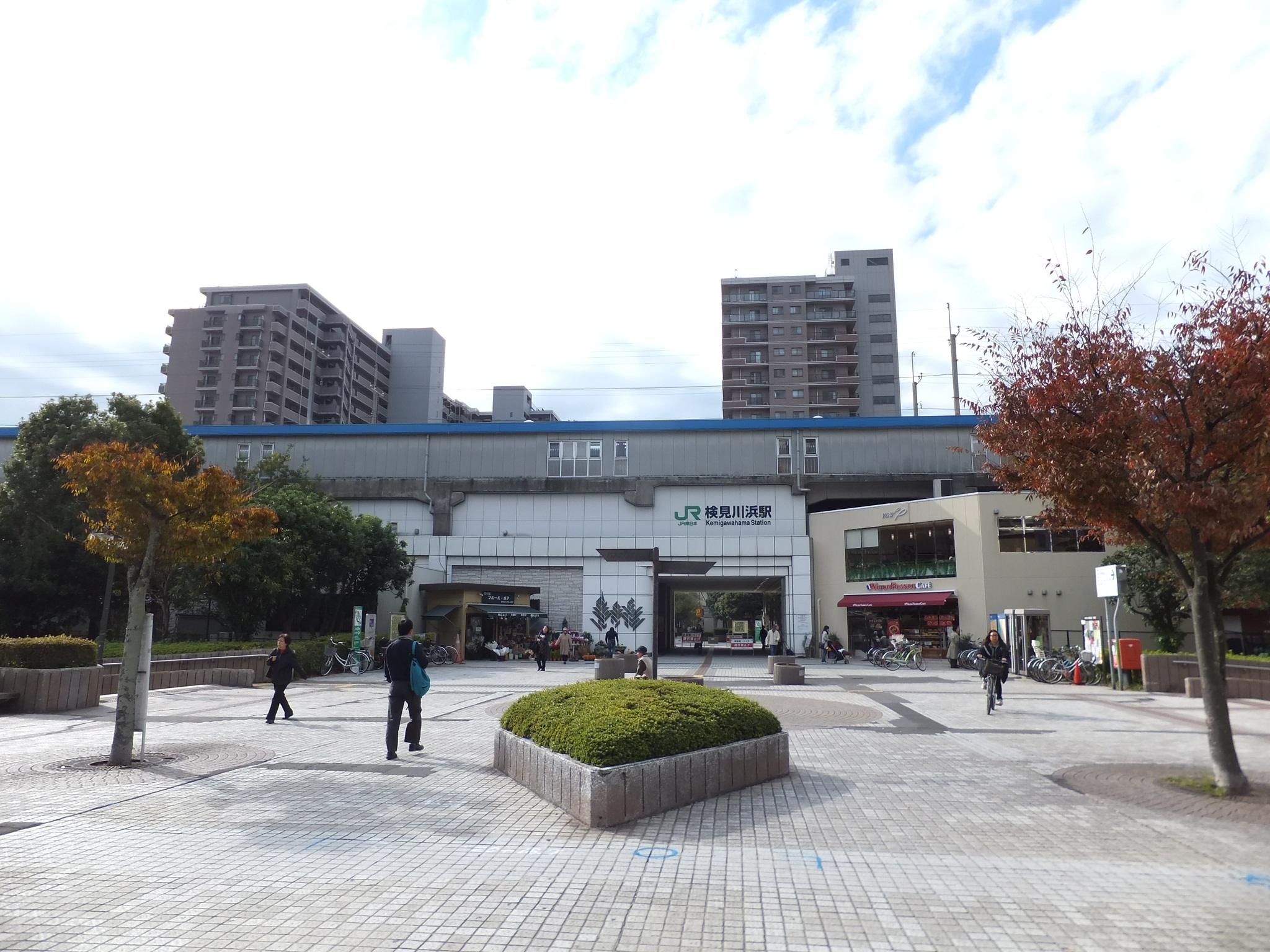
- North side of the station, November 2011

General information
- Location: 4-2-1 Masago, Mihama-ku, Chiba-shi, Chiba-ken 261-0011; Japan
- Coordinates: 35°38′13.27″N 140°3′33.07″E
- Operator: JR East
- Line: Keiyō Line
- Platforms: 2 side platforms
- Connections: Bus terminal

Construction
- Structure type: Elevated
- Accessible: Yes

Other information
- Status: Staffed
- Station code: JE15
- Website: Official website

History
- Opened: 3 March 1986

Passengers
- Fy2019: 15,635 (daily)

Services
Preceding station	JR East	Following station
Kaihimmakuhari JE14 towards Tokyo	Keiyō Line Rapid Local	Inagekaigan JE16 towards Soga
Location
- Location within Tokyo Keiyo area Location within Chiba Prefecture Location within Japan

Kemigawahama Station (検見川浜駅, Kemigawahama-eki) is a passenger railway station located in Mihama Ward, Chiba City, Chiba Prefecture, Japan, operated by the East Japan Railway Company (JR East).

== Lines ==
Kemigawahama Station is served by the Keiyō Line and is 33.7 km from the western terminus of the line at Tokyo Station.

== Station layout ==
The station consists of two elevated side platforms serving two tracks, with the station building located underneath. The station is staffed.

=== Platforms ===
1	Keiyō Line	for Soga
2	Keiyō Line	for Kaihimmakuhari and Tokyo

== History ==
The station opened on 3 March 1986. The station was absorbed into the JR East network upon the privatization of JNR on 1 April 1987.

Station numbering was introduced to in 2016 with Kemigawahama being assigned station number JE14. With the opening of Makuharitoyosuna in 2023, stations further down on the Keiyo Line were each shifted down one station number. As such, Kemigawahama was reassigned station number JE15.

== Passenger statistics ==
In fiscal 2019, the station was used by an average of 15,635 passengers daily.

== Surrounding area ==
- Mihama Ward Office
- Mihama Post Office
- Chiba Prefectural Kemigawa High School
- Tokyo Dental College Chiba campus
- Chiba Kaihin Municipal Hospital

== See also ==
- List of railway stations in Japan
