= Keiyō Line =

Railway line in Japan

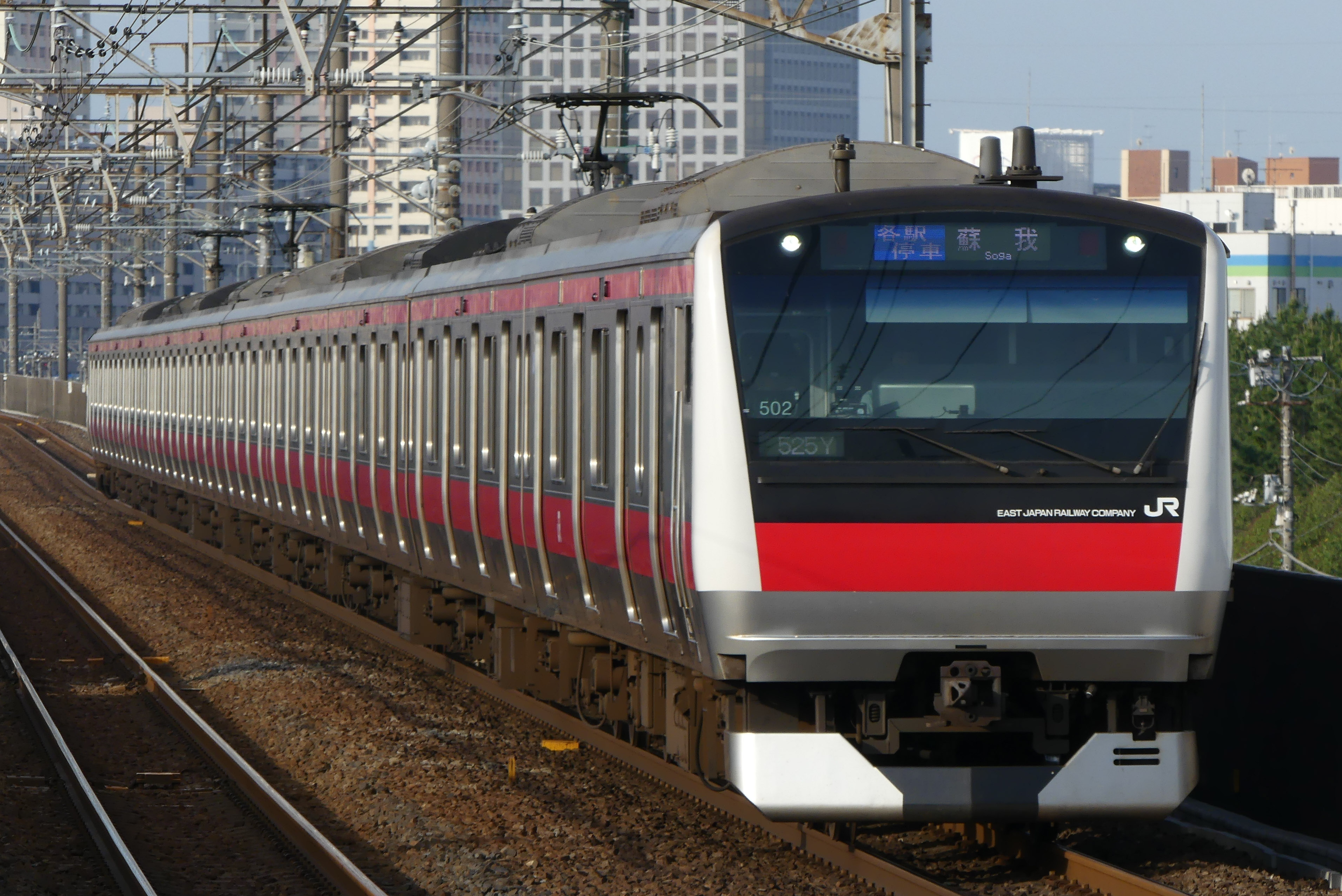
- A Keiyō Line E233-5000 series EMU in May 2018

Overview
- Native name: 京葉線
- Status: Operational
- Owner: JR East
- Locale: Tokyo, Chiba Prefecture
- Termini: Tokyo; Soga
- Stations: 19

Service
- Type: Commuter rail
- Depot: Narashino
- Rolling stock: E233-5000 series, 209-500 series
- Daily ridership: 714,053 (Daily 2015)

History
- Opened: May 10, 1975; 51 years ago

Technical
- Line length: 43 km (27 mi)
- Character: Underground, at-grade, elevated
- Track gauge: 1,067 mm (3 ft 6 in)
- Electrification: Overhead line, 1,500 V DC
- Operating speed: 100 km/h (62 mph)
Route map
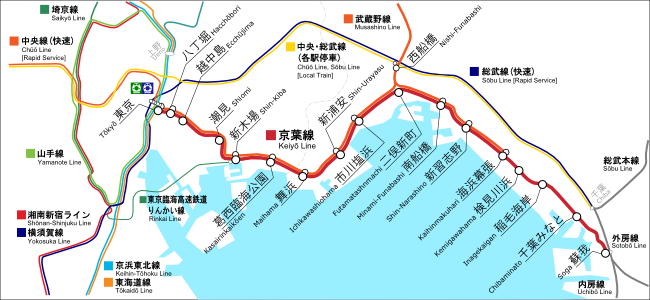

The Keiyō Line (Japanese: 京葉線, Hepburn: Keiyō-sen) is a railway line connecting Tokyo and Chiba in Japan, running along the eastern shore of Tokyo Bay. It is operated by the East Japan Railway Company (JR East). The line forms part of what JR East refers to as the "Tokyo Mega Loop" (東京メガループ), consisting of the Keiyō Line, Musashino Line, Nambu Line, and Yokohama Line. The line provides rail access to Tokyo Disney Resort and the Makuhari Messe exhibition center.

The terminus at Tokyo Station is located underground, south of the main station complex and roughly halfway toward Yūrakuchō Station. Transfers between the Keiyō Line and other lines at Tokyo Station can take between 15 and 20 minutes.

The name "Keiyō" is derived from the second character in the names of the two cities linked by the line, Tokyo (東京) and Chiba (千葉).

== Services ==
- Local (各駅停車, kakueki-teisha) trains stop at all stations between Tokyo and Soga except Nishi-Funabashi.
- Rapid (快速, kaisoku) trains stop at Tokyo, Hatchōbori, Shin-Kiba, Maihama, Shin-Urayasu, Minami-Funabashi, Kaihin-Makuhari, and all stops to Soga.
- Musashino Line ''Local'' through trains stop at all stations between Tokyo and Nishi-Funabashi before continuing to the Musashino Line. Some trains originate at Kaihin-Makuhari, stopping at Makuhari-Toyosuna, Shin-Narashino, Minami-Funabashi, and Nishi-Funabashi before continuing onto the Musashino Line.

=== Former service ===
- Commuter rapid service (通勤快速, tsūkin-kaisoku) trains stopped at Tokyo, Hatchōbori, Shin-Kiba, and Soga, with many operating through to the Sotobo line and Togane line, terminating at Naruto, Katsuura, or Kazusa-Ichinomiya. Commuter rapid trains traveled into Tokyo during the morning rush hour, and away from Tokyo during the evening rush hour. The commuter rapid service was discontinued with effect from the timetable revision implemented on 16 March 2024.

== Station list ==
- All trains (except limited express services) stop at stations marked "●" and pass those marked "|". Trains do not travel past those stations marked "||".
- For the Wakashio and Sazanami limited express services, see their respective articles.

No.	Station	Distance in km (mi)		Rapid	Musashino Line		Transfers	Location	
No.	Station	Between stations	Total	Rapid	to/from Chiba	to/from Tokyo	Transfers	Location	
	Tokyo 東京	—N/a	0 (0)	●		●	Hokkaido Shinkansen; Tōhoku Shinkansen; Akita Shinkansen; Yamagata Shinkansen; Jōetsu Shinkansen; Hokuriku Shinkansen; Tokaido Shinkansen; Yamanote Line (JY01); Keihin–Tōhoku Line (JK26); Chūō Line (JC01); Tōkaidō Line (JT01); Ueno–Tokyo Line (JU01); Sōbu Line (JO19); Yokosuka Line (JO19); Marunouchi Line (M-17); Chiyoda Line (Nijubashimae: C-10); Mita Line (Hibiya: I-08)	Chiyoda	Tokyo
JE02	Hatchōbori 八丁堀	1.2 (0.75)		●		●	Hibiya Line (H-12)	Chūō	Tokyo
JE03	Etchūjima 越中島	1.6 (0.99)	2.8 (1.7)	|		●		Kōtō	Tokyo
JE04	Shiomi 潮見	2.6 (1.6)	5.4 (3.4)	|		●		Kōtō	Tokyo
JE05	Shin-Kiba 新木場	2.0 (1.2)	7.4 (4.6)	●		●	Rinkai Line (R01); Yūrakuchō Line (Y-24)	Kōtō	Tokyo
JE06	Kasai-Rinkai Park 葛西臨海公園	3.2 (2.0)	10.6 (6.6)	|		●		Edogawa	Tokyo
JE07	Maihama 舞浜	2.1 (1.3)	12.7 (7.9)	●		●	Disney Resort Line (Resort Gateway)	Urayasu	Chiba
JE08	Shin-Urayasu 新浦安	3.4 (2.1)	16.1 (10.0)	●		●		Urayasu	Chiba
JE09	Ichikawashiohama 市川塩浜	2.1 (1.3)	18.2 (11.3)	|		●	Musashino Line (through service)	Ichikawa	Chiba
JE10	Futamatashimmachi 二俣新町	4.4 (2.7)	22.6 (14.0)	|	|| (Note: Musashino Line trains do not pass through Futamatashimmachi.)			Ichikawa	Chiba
JE11	Minami-Funabashi 南船橋	3.4 (2.1) (Note: Distance between Nishi-Funabashi on the Musashino Line and Minami-Funabashi is 5.4 km (3.4 mi).)	26.0 (16.2)	●	●		Musashino Line (through service)	Funabashi	Chiba
JE12	Shin-Narashino 新習志野	2.3 (1.4)	28.3 (17.6)	|	●			Narashino	Chiba
JE13	Makuhari-Toyosuna 幕張豊砂	1.7 (1.1)	30.0 (18.6)	|	●			Mihama	Chiba
JE14	Kaihimmakuhari 海浜幕張	1.7 (1.1)	31.7 (19.7)	●	●			Mihama	Chiba
JE15	Kemigawahama 検見川浜	2.0 (1.2)	33.7 (20.9)	●				Mihama	Chiba
JE16	Inagekaigan 稲毛海岸	1.6 (0.99)	35.3 (21.9)	●				Mihama	Chiba
JE17	Chibaminato 千葉みなと	3.7 (2.3)	39.0 (24.2)	●			Chiba Urban Monorail (CM01)	Chūō	Chiba
	Soga 蘇我	4.0 (2.5)	43.0 (26.7)	●			Uchibō Line (through service) (Note: Some local and rapid trains run through to the Uchibō Line (to/from Kimitsu or from Kazusa-Minato) or the Sotobō Line (to/from Honda, Kazusa-Ichinomiya, and via the Tōgane Line to/from Narutō).); Sotobō Line (through service)	Chūō	Chiba

== Rolling stock ==
All Keiyō Line and Musashino Line rolling stock is based at the Keiyō Rolling Stock Center near Shin-Narashino Station.

=== Keiyō Line ===
- 209-500 series single 10-car EMU train set (magenta stripe) (since October 2008)
- E233-5000 series 10-car EMUs (magenta stripe) (since 1 July 2010)

=== Musashino Line through services ===
- 209-500 series 8-car EMUs (orange/brown stripe) (since 4 December 2010)
- E231-0 series 8-car EMUs (orange/brown stripe) (since November 2017)
- E231-900 series 8-car EMU (orange/brown stripe) (since 20 July 2020)
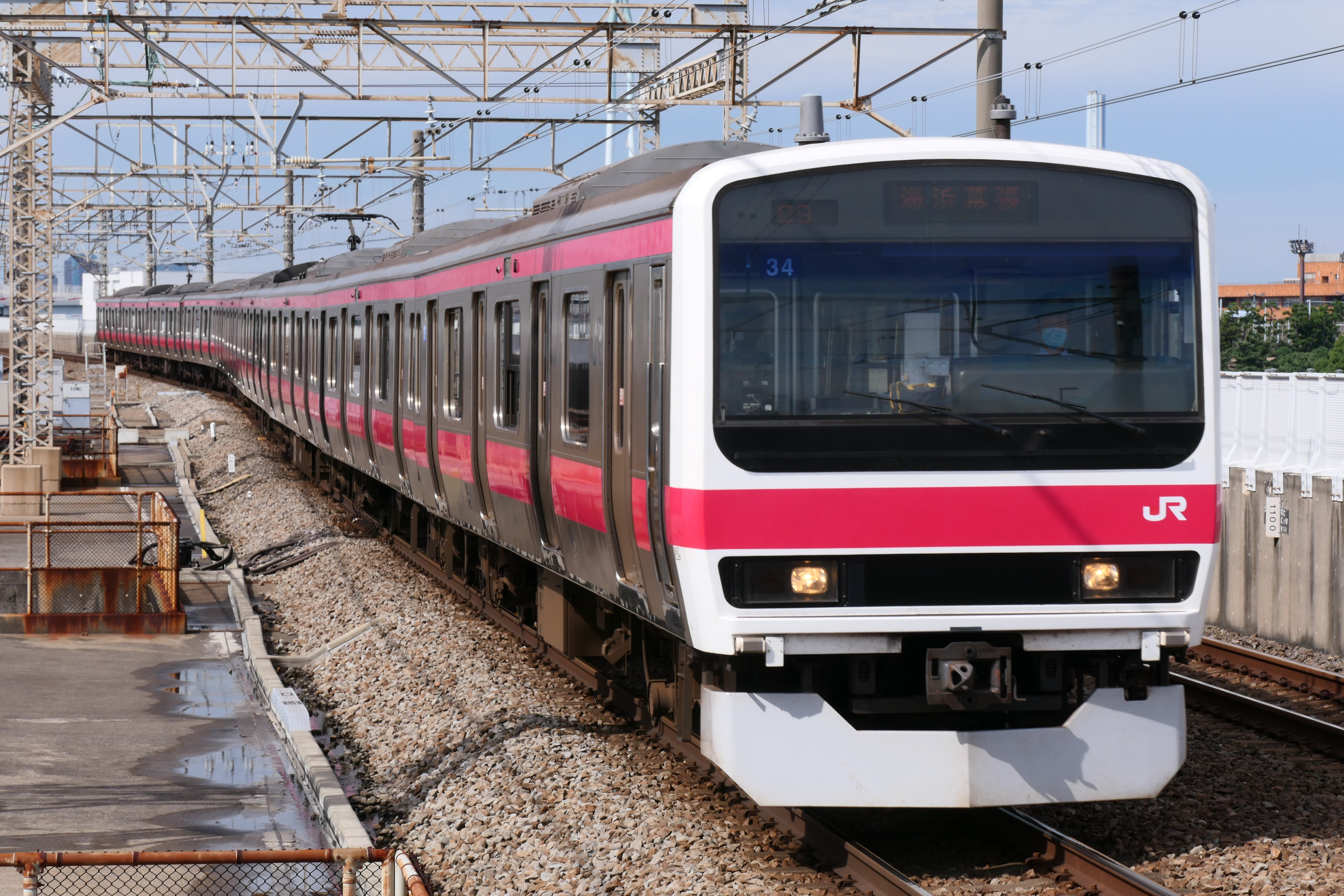
A Keiyo Line 209-500 series 10-car EMU

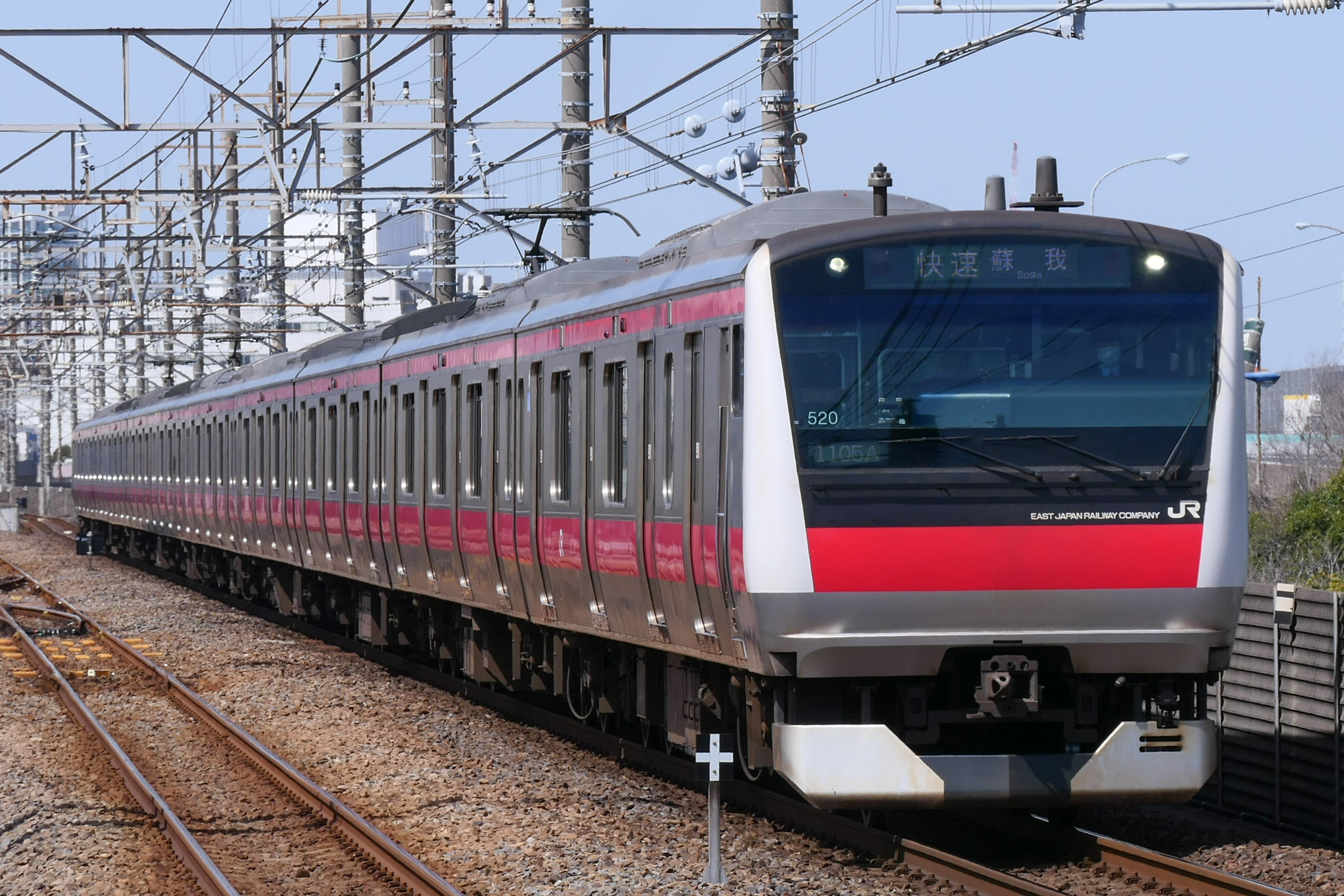
A Keiyo Line E233-5000 series 10-car EMU

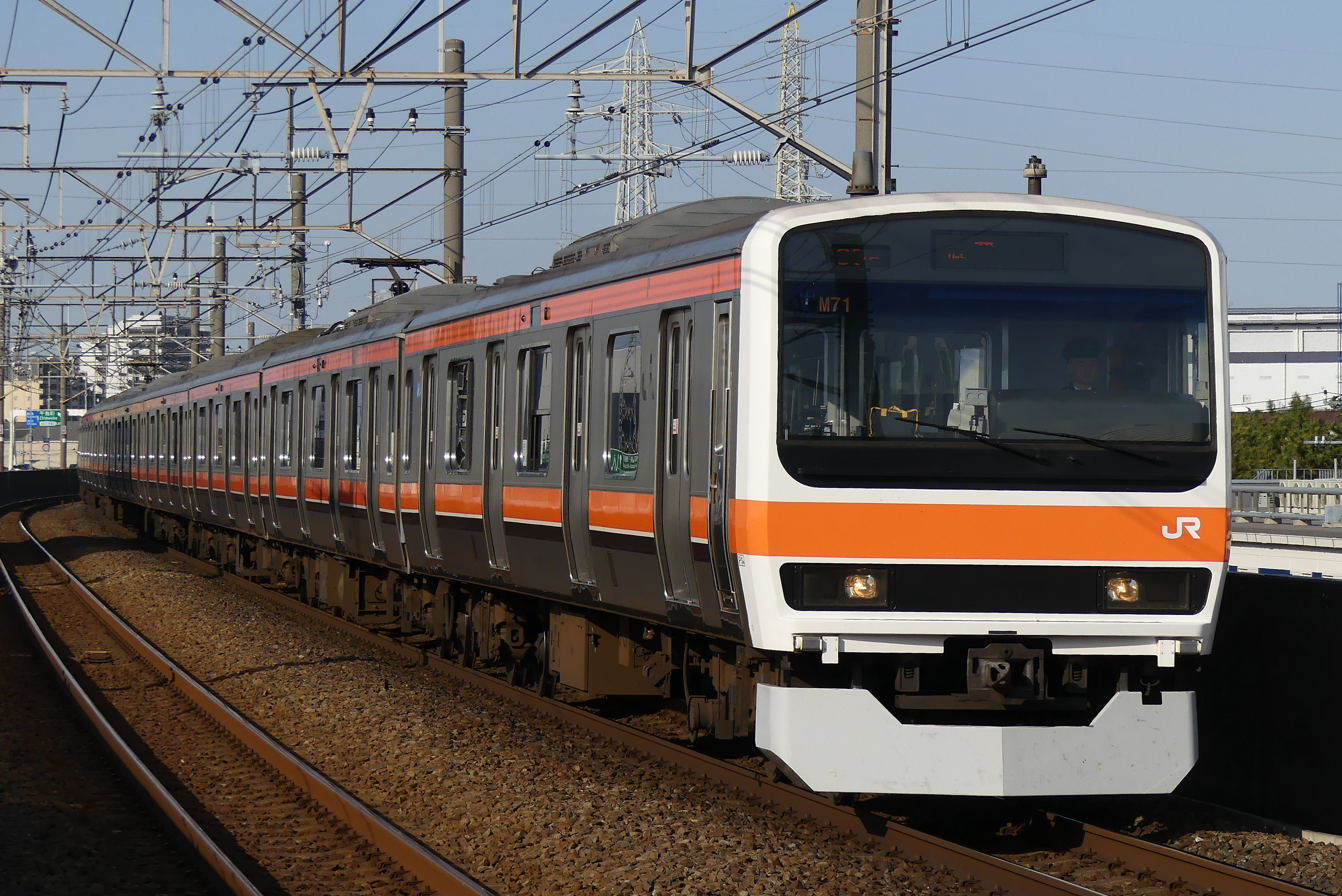
A Musashino Line 209-500 series 8-car EMU

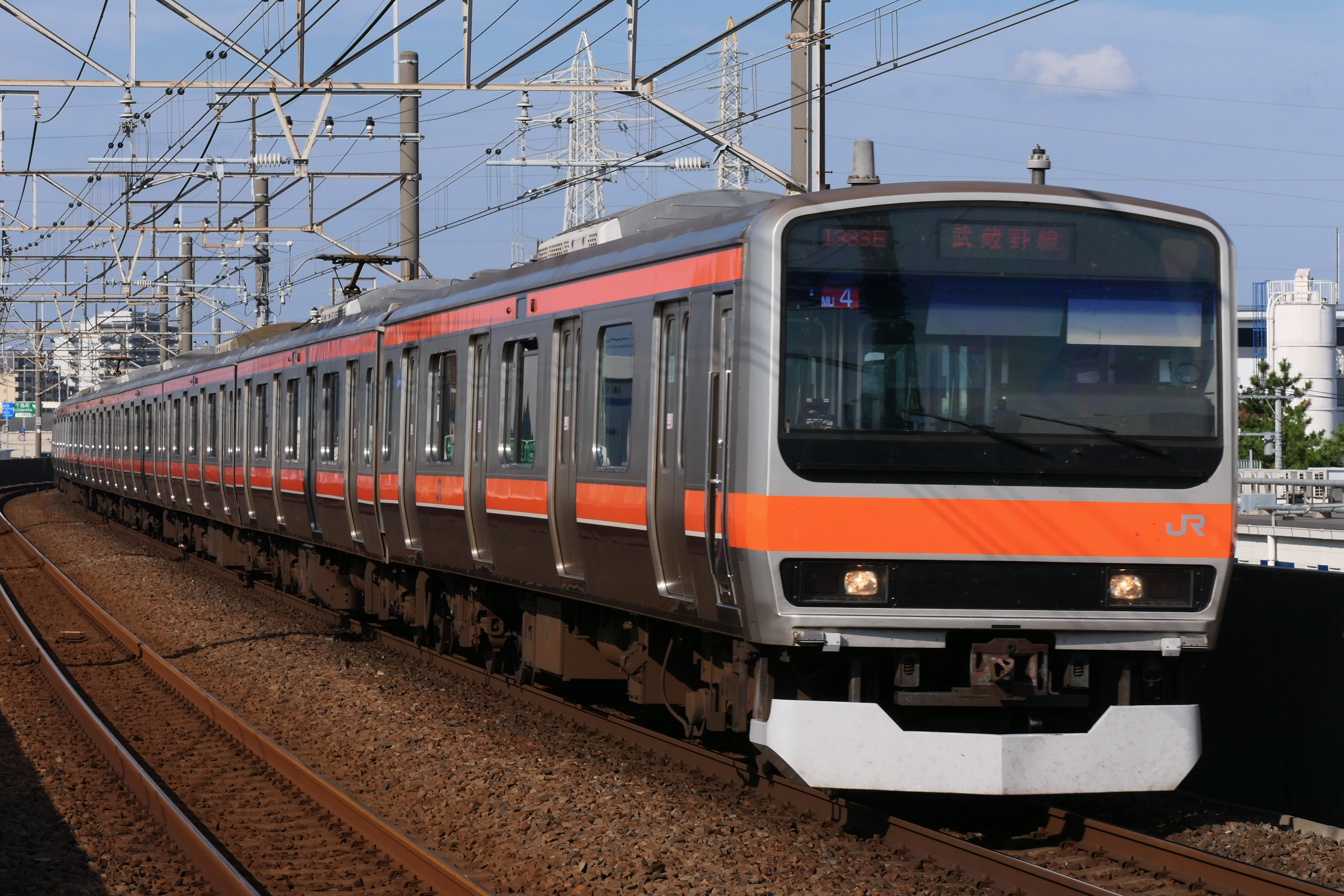
A Musashino Line E231-0 series 8-car EMU

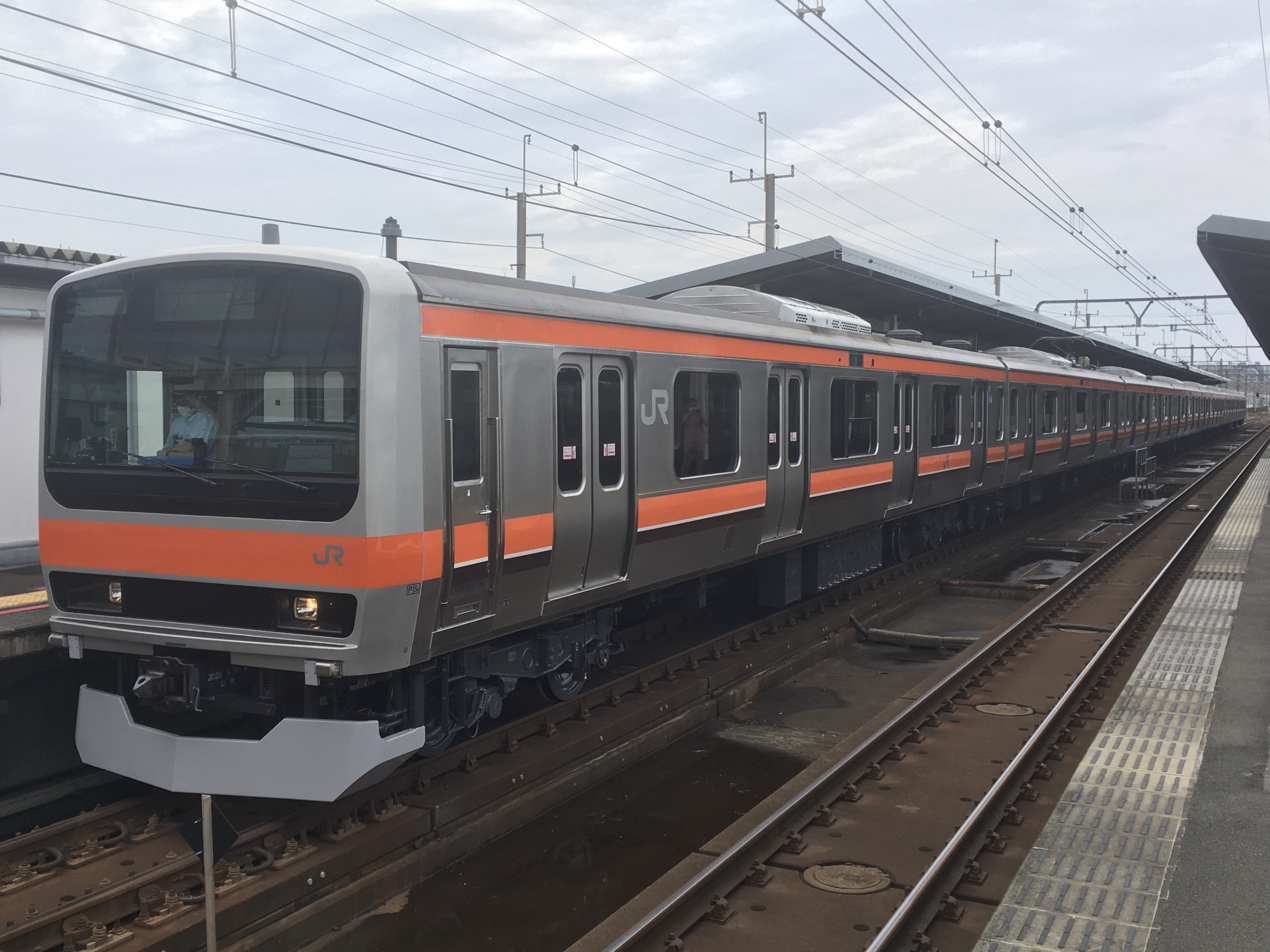
A Musashino Line E231-900 series 8-car EMU

== Former rolling stock ==
=== Keiyō Line ===
- 103 series 4/6/10-car EMUs (sky blue livery) (from 1986 until November 2005)
- 165 series 3-car EMU (x1) Shuttle Maihama (from 1990 until 1995)
- 201 series 10-car EMUs (sky blue livery) (from August 2000 until 20 June 2011)
- 205-0 series 10-car EMUs (magenta stripe) (from March 1990 until 2011)
- E331 series 14-car EMU (x1) (magenta stripe) (from March 2007 until 2011)

=== Musashino Line through services ===
Inter-running from the Musashino Line to the Keiyō Line commenced on 1 December 1988.

- 103 series 6-car (later 8-car) EMUs (orange livery) (from 1 December 1988 - 8 December 2005)
- 201 series 6-car EMUs (orange livery) (from 1 December 1988 - November 1996)
- 205-0 series 8-car EMUs (orange/brown stripe) (from December 1991 - October 2019)
- 205-5000 series 8-car EMUs (orange/brown stripe) (from 2002 - 19 October 2020)
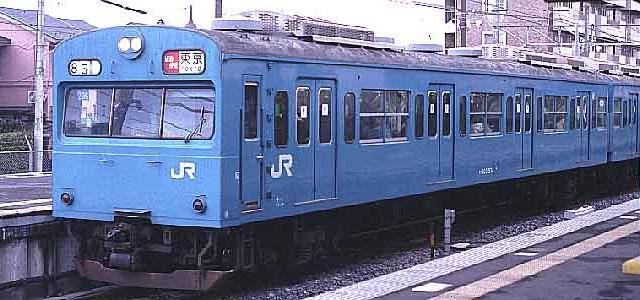
A Keiyo Line 103 series EMU

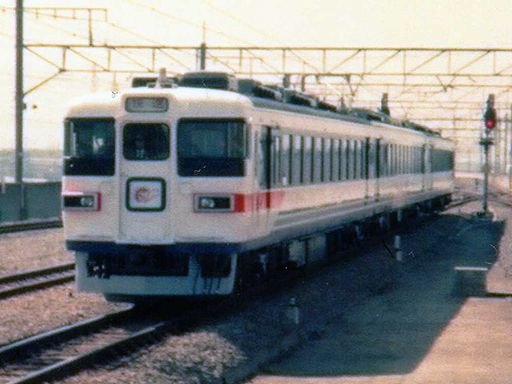
A 165 series Shuttle Maihama EMU set, March 1990

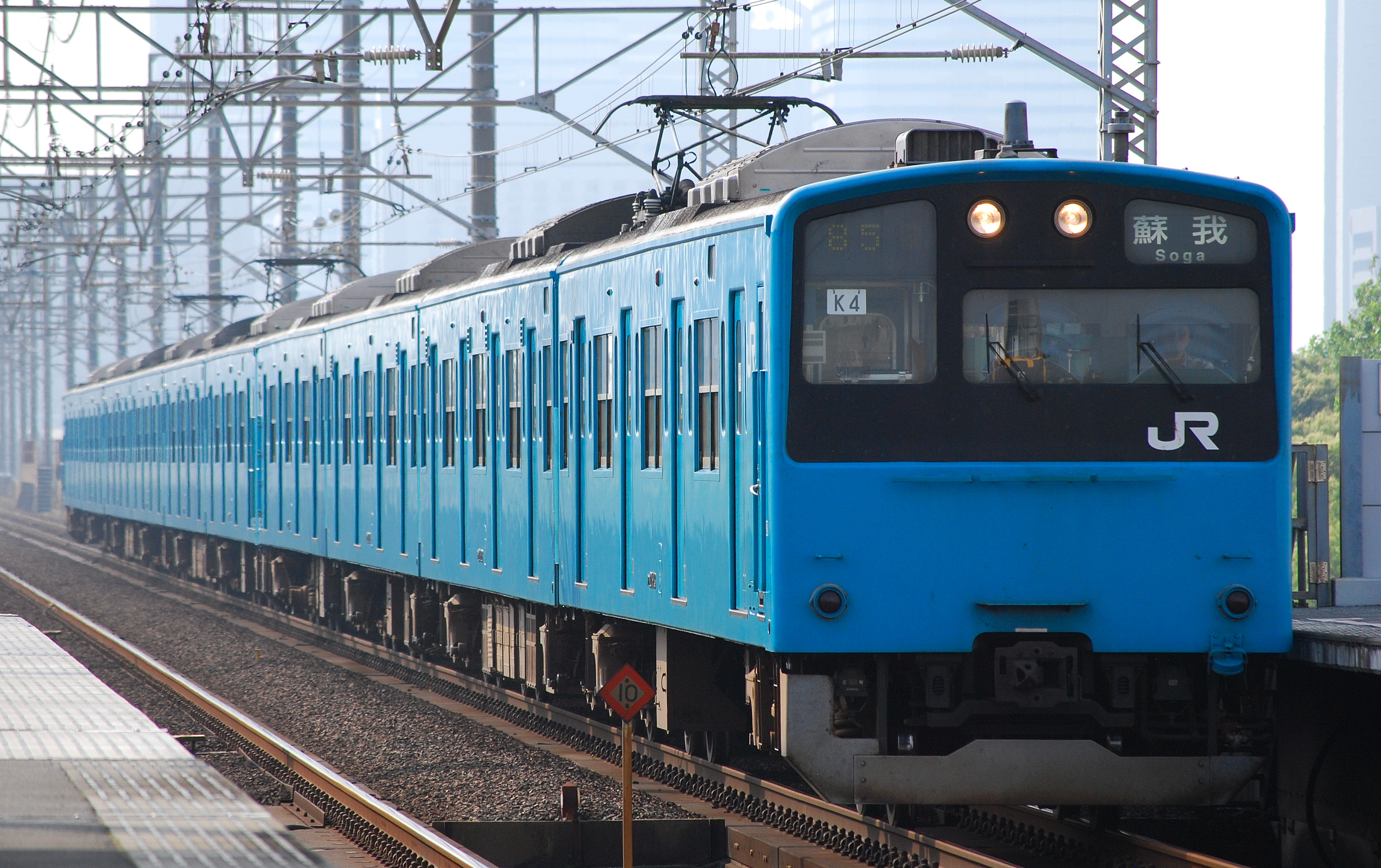
A Keiyo Line 201 series EMU, July 2010

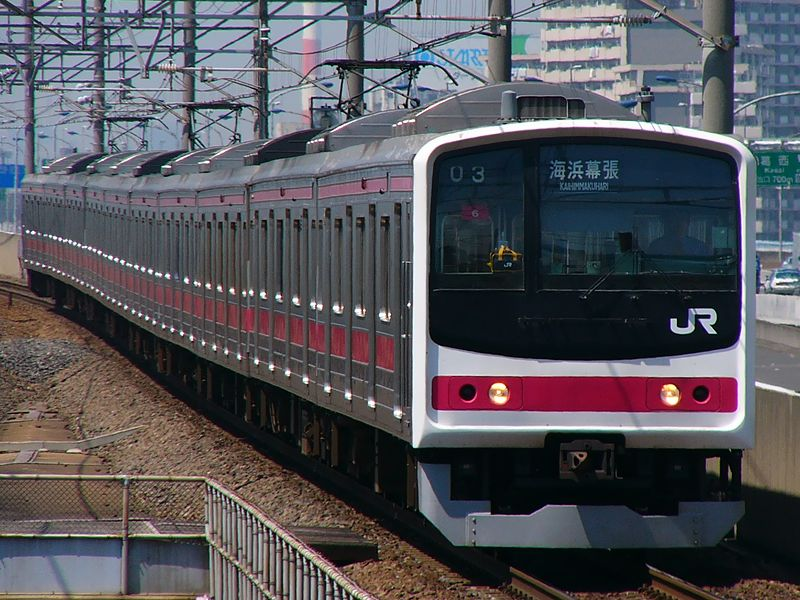
A Keiyo Line 205-0 series EMU, April 2004

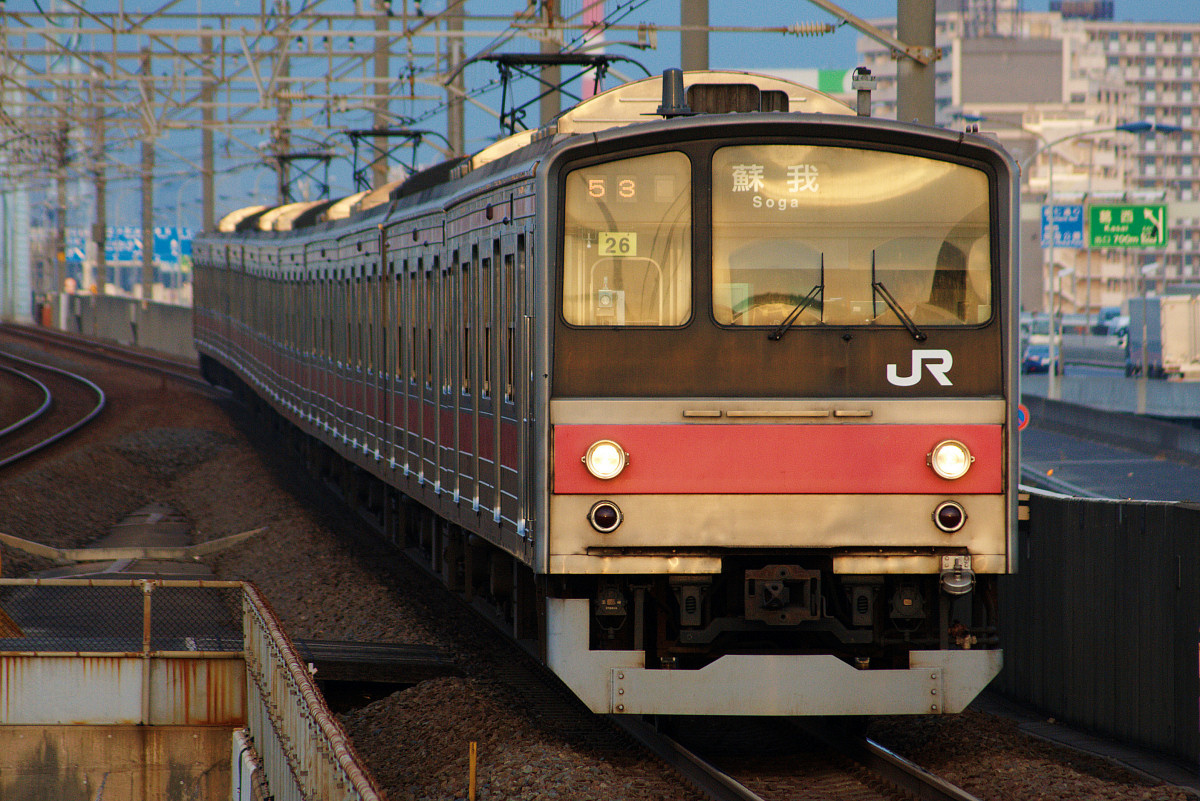
A Keiyo Line 205-0 series EMU, January 2009

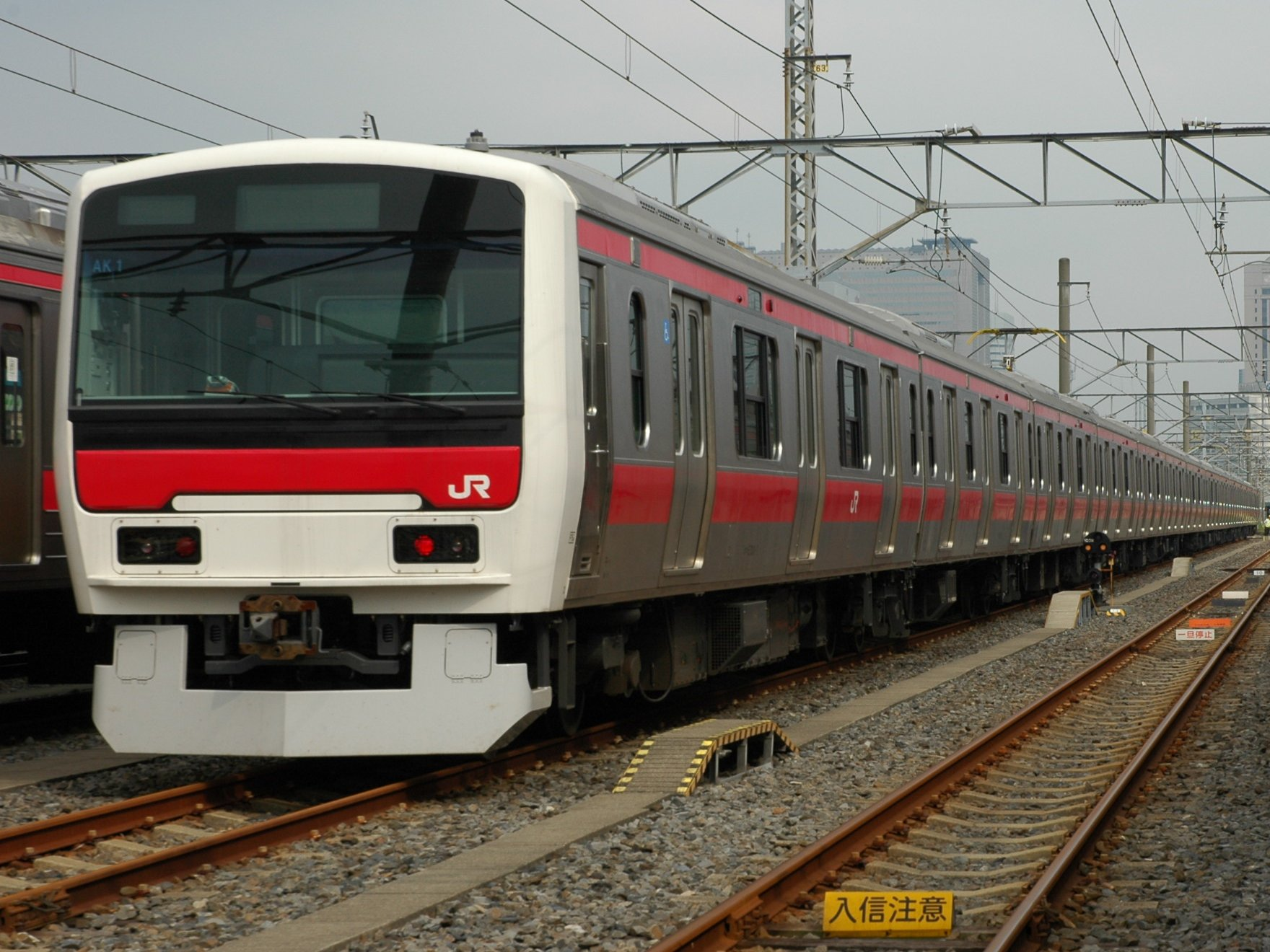
A Keiyo Line E331 series EMU, July 2006

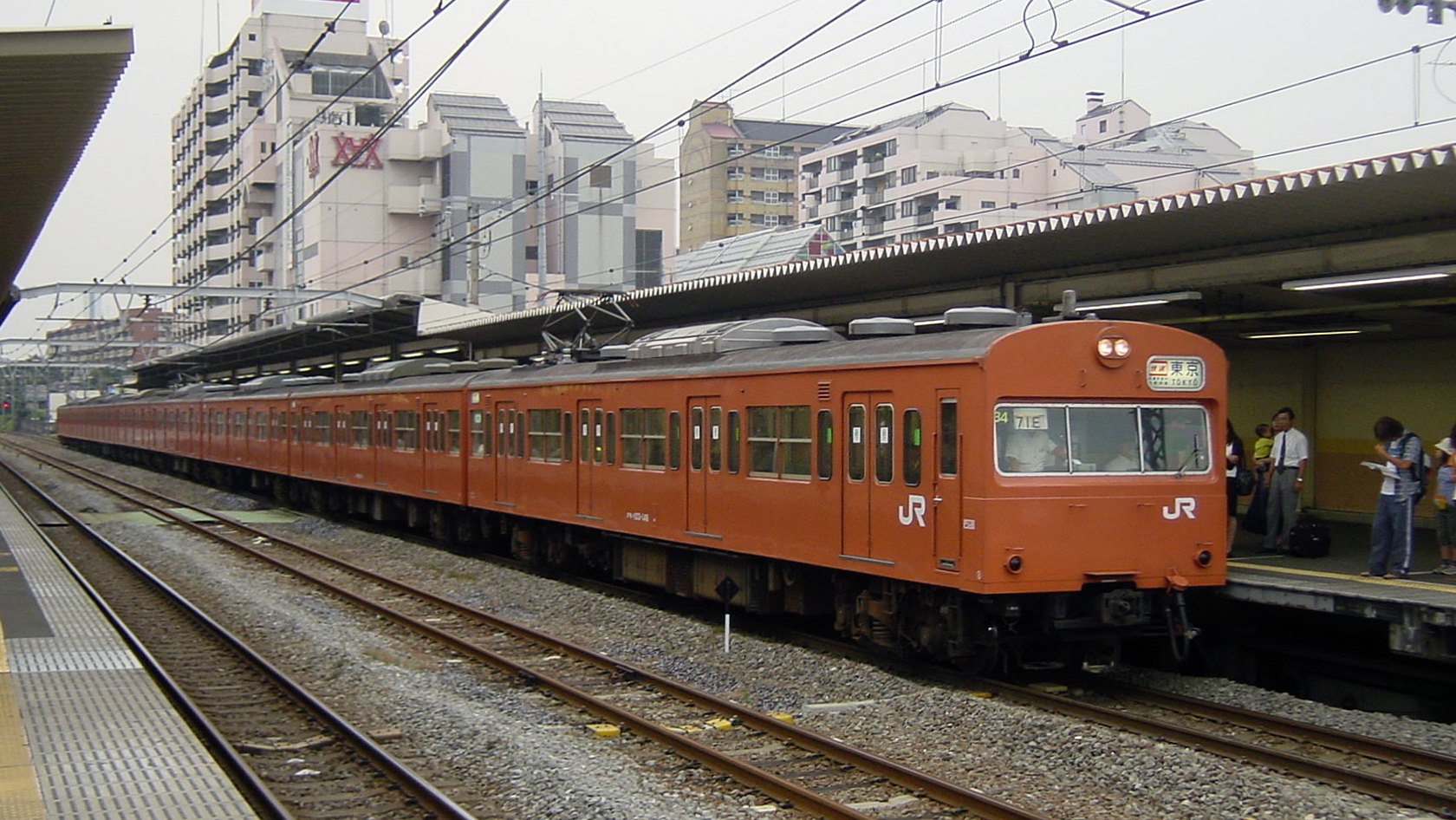
A Musashino Line 103 series EMU, August 2001

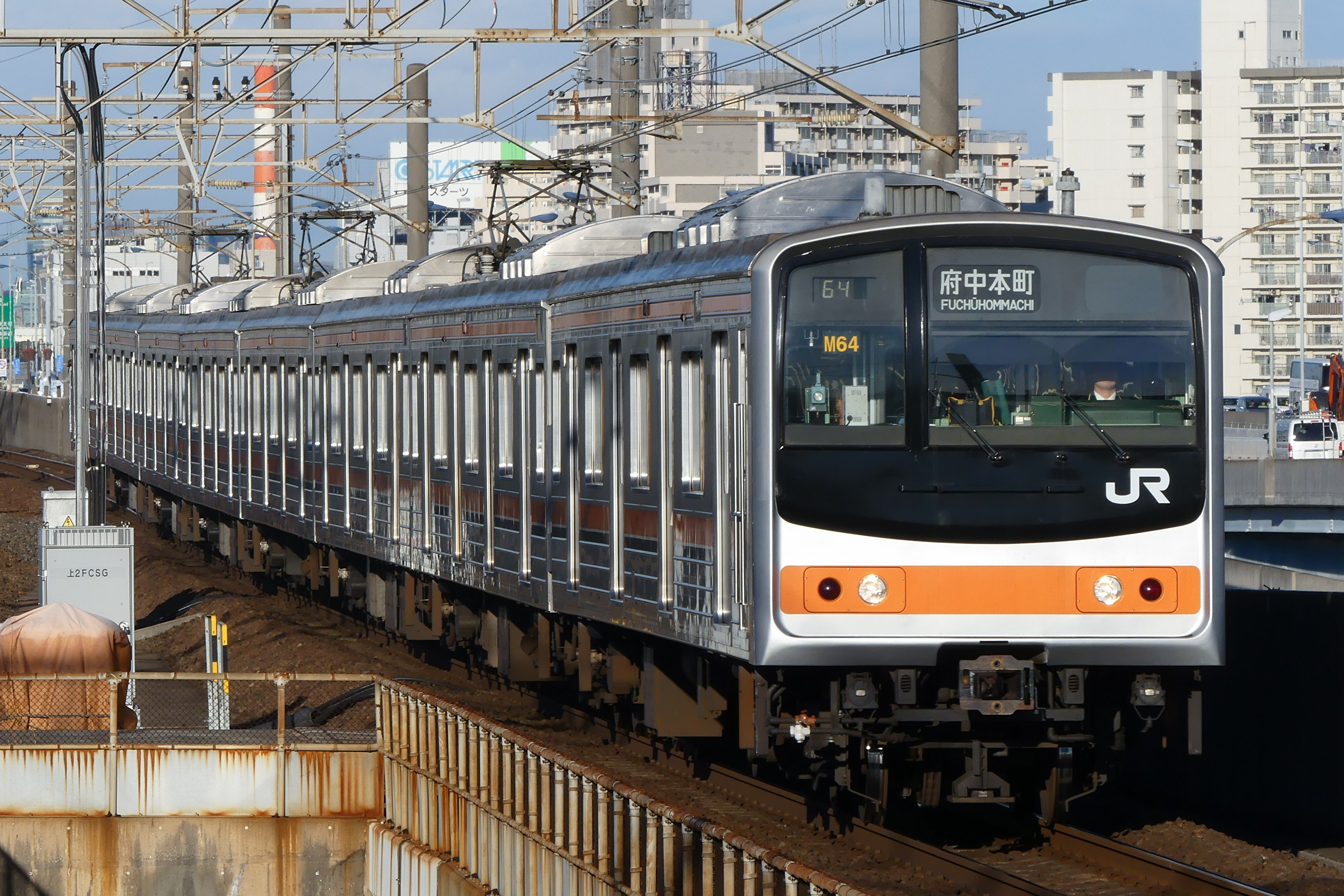
A Musashino Line 205-0 series EMU, December 2016

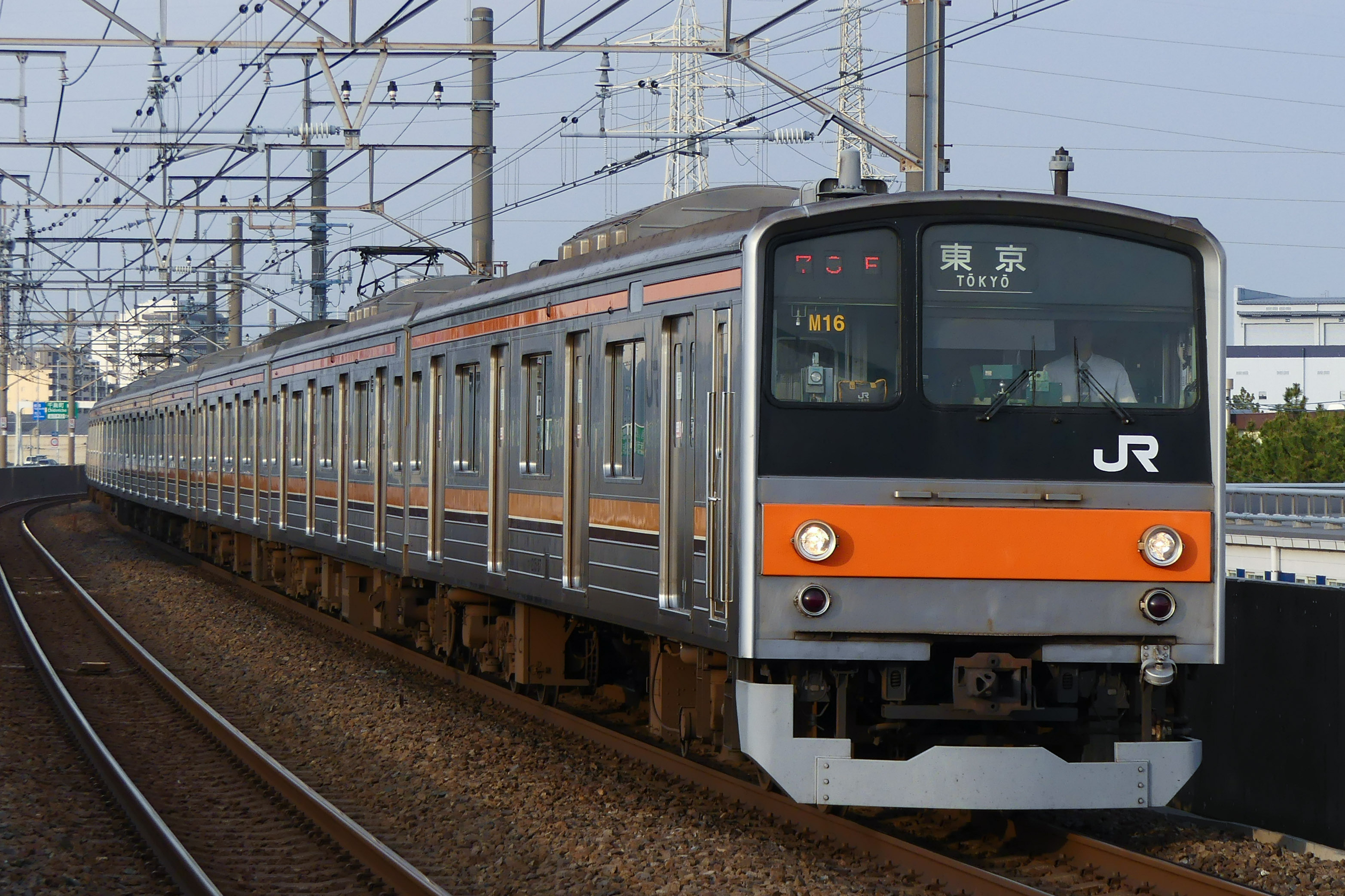
A Musashino Line 205-5000 series EMU, March 2019

=== Timeline ===
103 series
165 series
205 series
201 series
E331 series
209-500 series
E233-5000 series
103 series
201 series
205-0 series
205-5000 series
209-500 series
E231-0 series
E231-900 series
│
1985
│
1990
│
1995
│
2000
│
2005
│
2010
│
2015
│
2020
Rolling stock transitions since 1986

== History ==
The Keiyo Line was initially planned as a freight-only line. Its first section opened on 10 May 1975 as a 6.5 km (4.0 mi) link between the Chiba Freight Terminal and the freight yard next to Soga Station.

Passenger service began on 3 March 1986 between Minami-Funabashi and Chibaminato. On 1 December 1988, the line was extended west from Minami-Funabashi to Shin-Kiba and a branch opened between Ichikawashiohama and Nishi-Funabashi. The final section, between Tokyo and Shin-Kiba, opened on 10 March 1990. The 205 series was also introduced on the line that year. On 16 March 1991, Sazanami and Wakashio limited express services were rerouted via the Keiyo Line. 255 series EMUs were introduced on View Sazanami and View Wakashio services on 2 July 1993, followed by E257-500 series EMUs on Sazanami and Wakashio services on 16 October 2004.

Planners originally envisioned a freight line connecting with Tokyo Freight Terminal and the Tokaido Main Line, providing a connection between the Musashino Line and the freight network south of Tokyo. The Rinkai Line later reused the partially completed tunnel between Shin-Kiba and Tokyo Freight Terminal, with part of the tracks at the latter used as a depot. The disused tracks between Tokyo Freight Terminal and the Tokaido Main Line are planned for reuse as part of the Haneda Airport Access Line.

The platforms at Tokyo Station were originally built to accommodate the Narita Shinkansen, a planned high-speed railway between central Tokyo and Narita International Airport that was never completed.

In the 1990s, as Odaiba developed as a commercial and tourist area, the Rinkai Line was repurposed for passenger service. The Rinkai Line has a through connection with the Keiyo Line, but passenger trains use the connection only for charter services, usually carrying groups to the Tokyo Disney Resort.

With the timetable revision on 16 March 2024, JR East reduced the number of rapid services on the Keiyo Line and discontinued Commuter Rapid services during the morning and evening rush hours. Rapid trains no longer operate during those periods, except for two westbound morning services originating in Soga. Local trains operate during the affected periods. The Wakashio and Sazanami limited express services therefore provide the remaining express services between the Uchibo and Sotobo lines and Tokyo during rush hours. The Chiba prefectural government criticized the timetable revision, stating that the changes would inconvenience commuters traveling between central Tokyo and areas of Chiba Prefecture. It cited longer journey times for passengers traveling the length of the line because local trains take longer than rapid services.

On 20 August 2016, station numbering was introduced on the Keiyo Line, with stations assigned numbers from JE01 at Tokyo to JE16 at Chibaminato. On 18 March 2023, Makuharitoyosuna Station opened between Kaihin-Makuhari and Shin-Narashino, and the station numbers for stations from Kaihin-Makuhari to Chibaminato increased by one.

=== Future plans ===
A proposal has been made to introduce 12-car trains with Green Cars on the Keiyo Line, similar to the configuration used on the Chuo Line Rapid. The proposal would require platform extensions and other infrastructure work.
