= Minami-Funabashi Station =

Railway station in Funabashi, Chiba Prefecture, Japan

JE11 Minami-Funabashi Station 南船橋駅
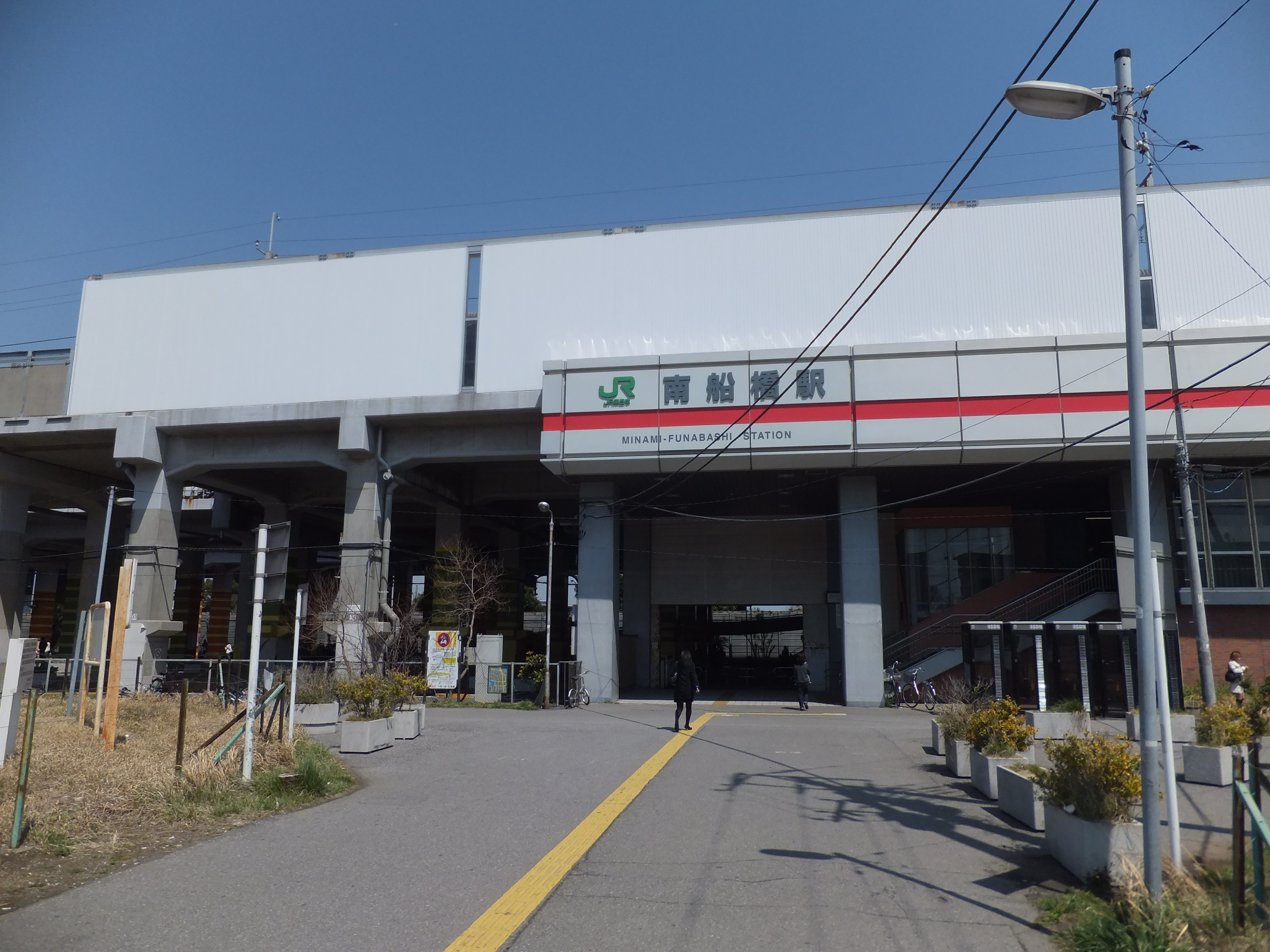
- Station building, April 2012

General information
- Location: 2 Wakamatsu; Funabashi, Chiba; Japan
- Coordinates: 35°40′54″N 139°59′48″E
- Operator: JR East
- Lines: Keiyō Line; Futamata Branch (Musashino Line)
- Distance: 26.0 km (16.2 mi) from Tokyo
- Platforms: 2 island platforms
- Tracks: 4
- Connections: Bus terminal

Construction
- Structure type: Elevated
- Cycle facilities: Yes
- Accessible: Yes

Other information
- Status: Staffed
- Station code: JE11
- Website: Official website

History
- Opened: 3 March 1986

Passengers
- FY2019: 22,763 daily

Services
Preceding station	JR East	Following station
Shin-Urayasu JE08 towards Tokyo	Keiyō Line Rapid	Kaihimmakuhari JE14 towards Soga
Futamatashimmachi JE10 towards Tokyo	Keiyō Line Local	Shin-Narashino JE12 towards Soga
Nishi-Funabashi JM10 towards Ōmiya	Shimōsa	Shin-Narashino JE12 towards Kaihimmakuhari
Nishi-Funabashi JM10 towards Fuchūhommachi	Musashino Line Keiyō Line through-service	Shin-Narashino JE12 towards Kaihimmakuhari
Location
- Location within Tokyo Keiyo area Location within Chiba Prefecture Location within Japan

Minami-Funabashi Station (南船橋駅, Minami-Funabashi-eki) is a passenger railway station in the city of Funabashi, Chiba, Japan, operated by East Japan Railway Company (JR East).

== Lines ==
Minami-Funabashi Station is served by the Keiyō Line from Tokyo and also by the orbital Musashino Line from Fuchūhommachi via Nishi-Funabashi. It is 26.0 kilometers from Tokyo Station.

== Station layout ==
Station track diagram

The elevated station consists of two island platforms serving four tracks. The two centre tracks are used by terminating Musashino Line services. The station is staffed.

=== Platforms ===
1	Keiyō Line	for Kaihimmakuhari, Chibaminato, Soga, Kimitsu, and Kazusa-Ichinomiya
2-3	Musashino Line through service	starting for Nishi-Funabashi, Shim-Matsudo, and Fuchūhommachi
4	Musashino Line through service	from Shin-Narashino and Kaihimmakuhari for Nishi-Funabashi, Shim-Matsudo, and Fuchūhommachi
4	Keiyō Line	for Maihama, Shin-Kiba, and Tokyo

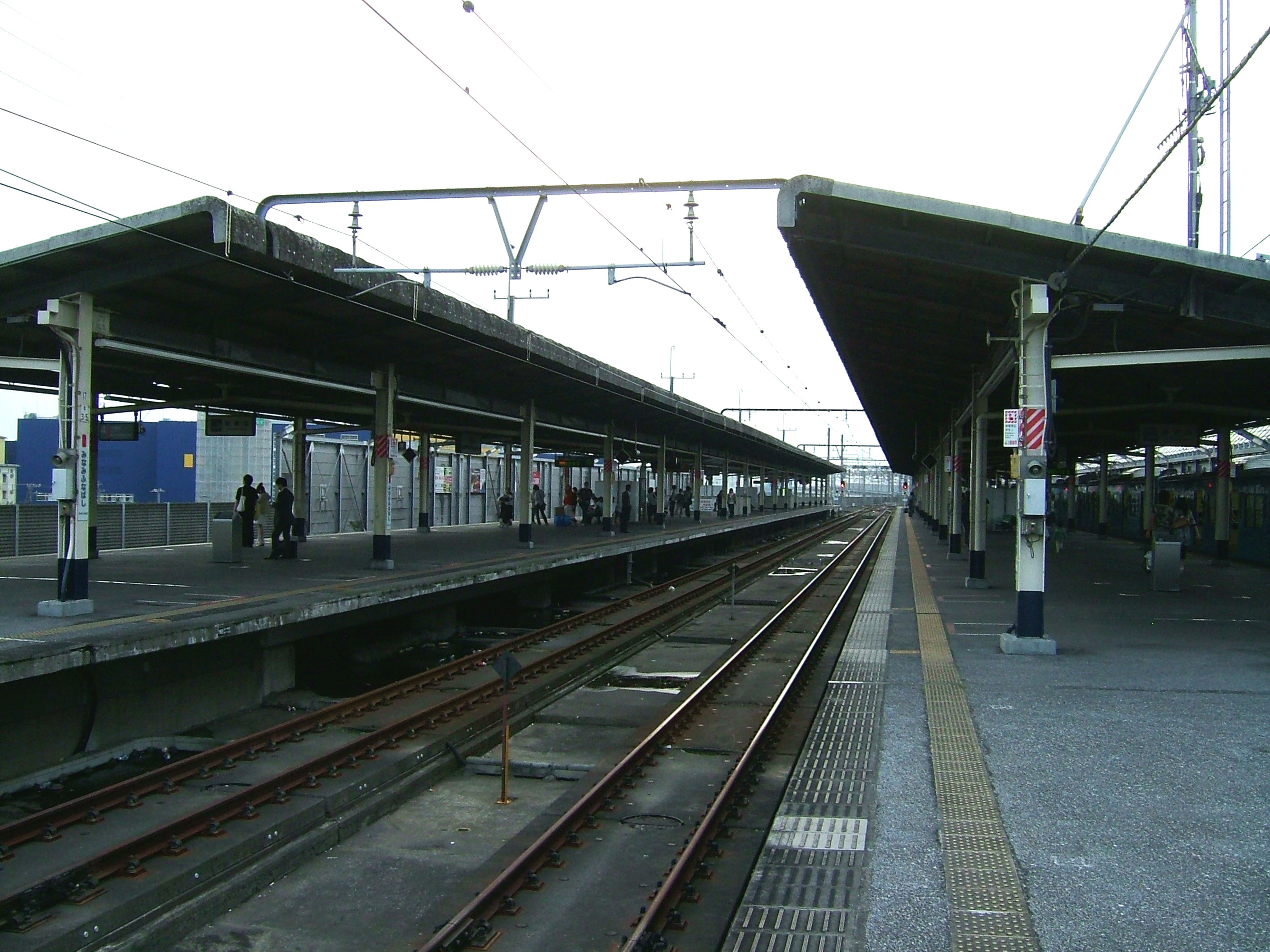
View of the platforms looking westward, June 2008

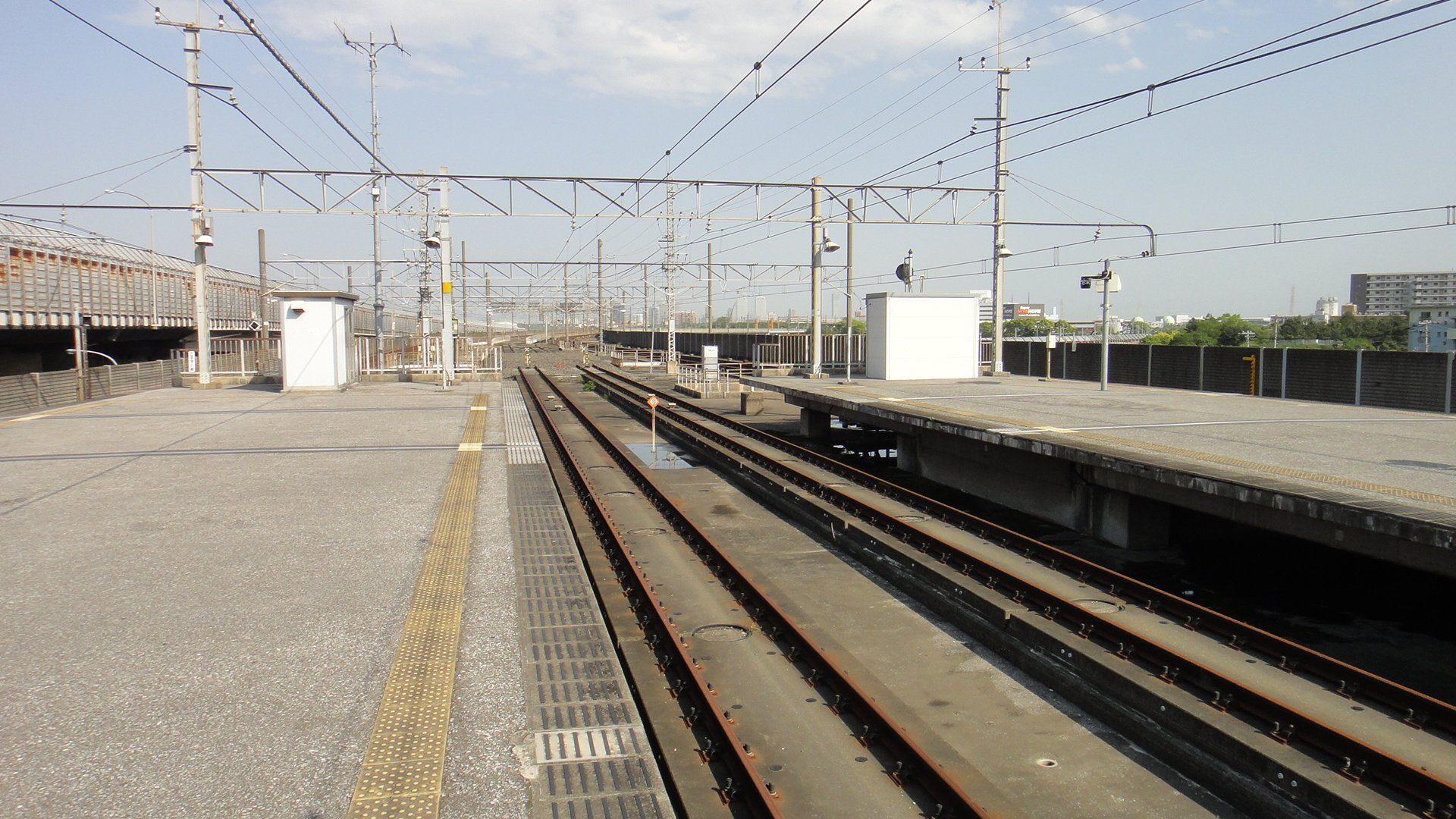
View looking west, showing the terminating centre (Musashino Line) tracks, May 2011

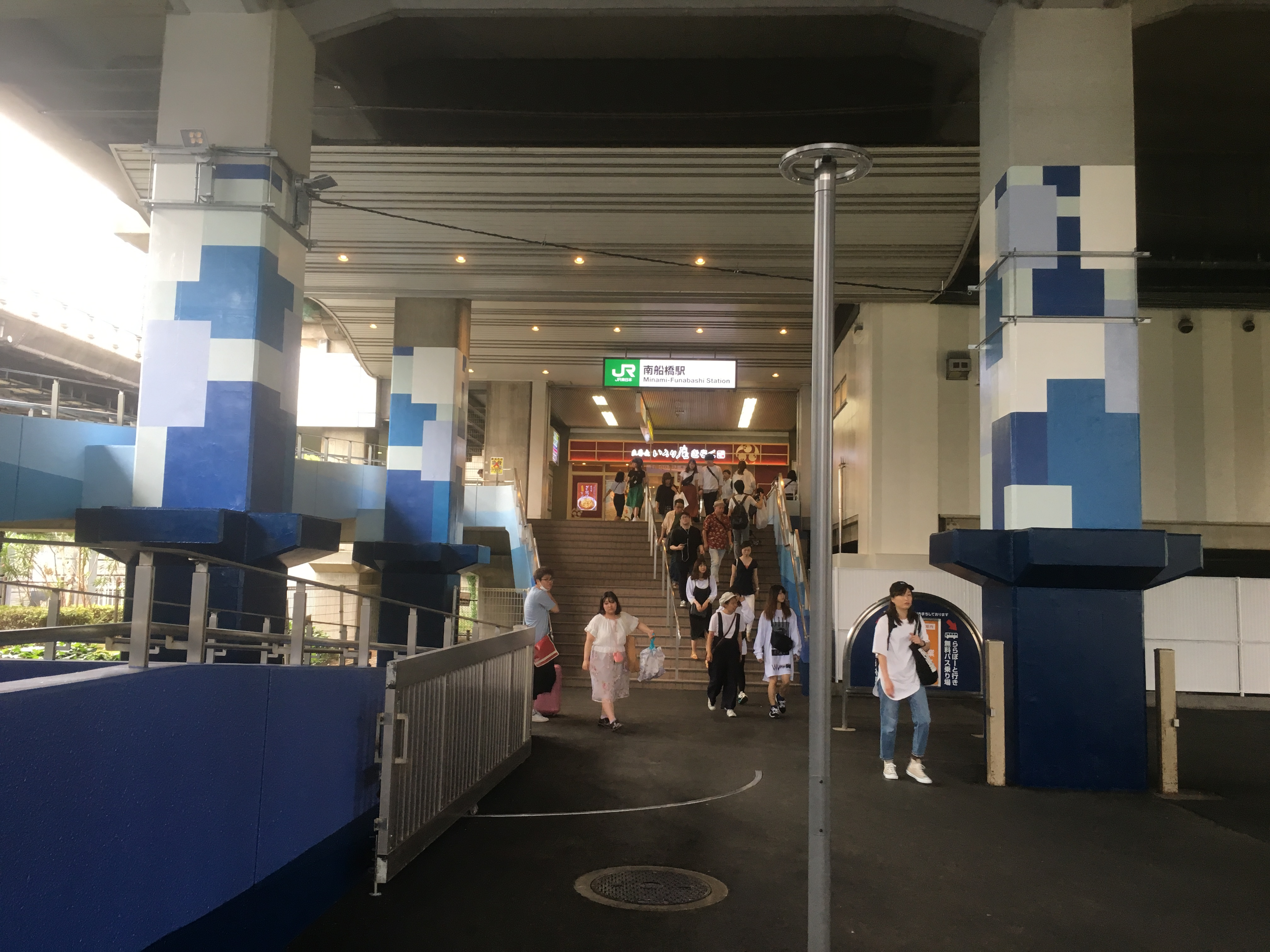
Entrance below the tracks, June 2019

== History ==
The station opened on 3 March 1986.

Station numbering was introduced in 2016 with Minami-Funabashi being assigned station number JE11.

== Passenger statistics ==
In fiscal 2019, the station was used by an average of 22,763 passengers daily (boarding passengers only).

== Surrounding area ==
- Funabashi Racecourse
- Lalaport Tokyo Bay shopping mall
- IKEA Funabashi branch

== See also ==
- List of railway stations in Japan
