= Mihama-ku =

Mihama 美浜区
- Ward
- Mihama Ward
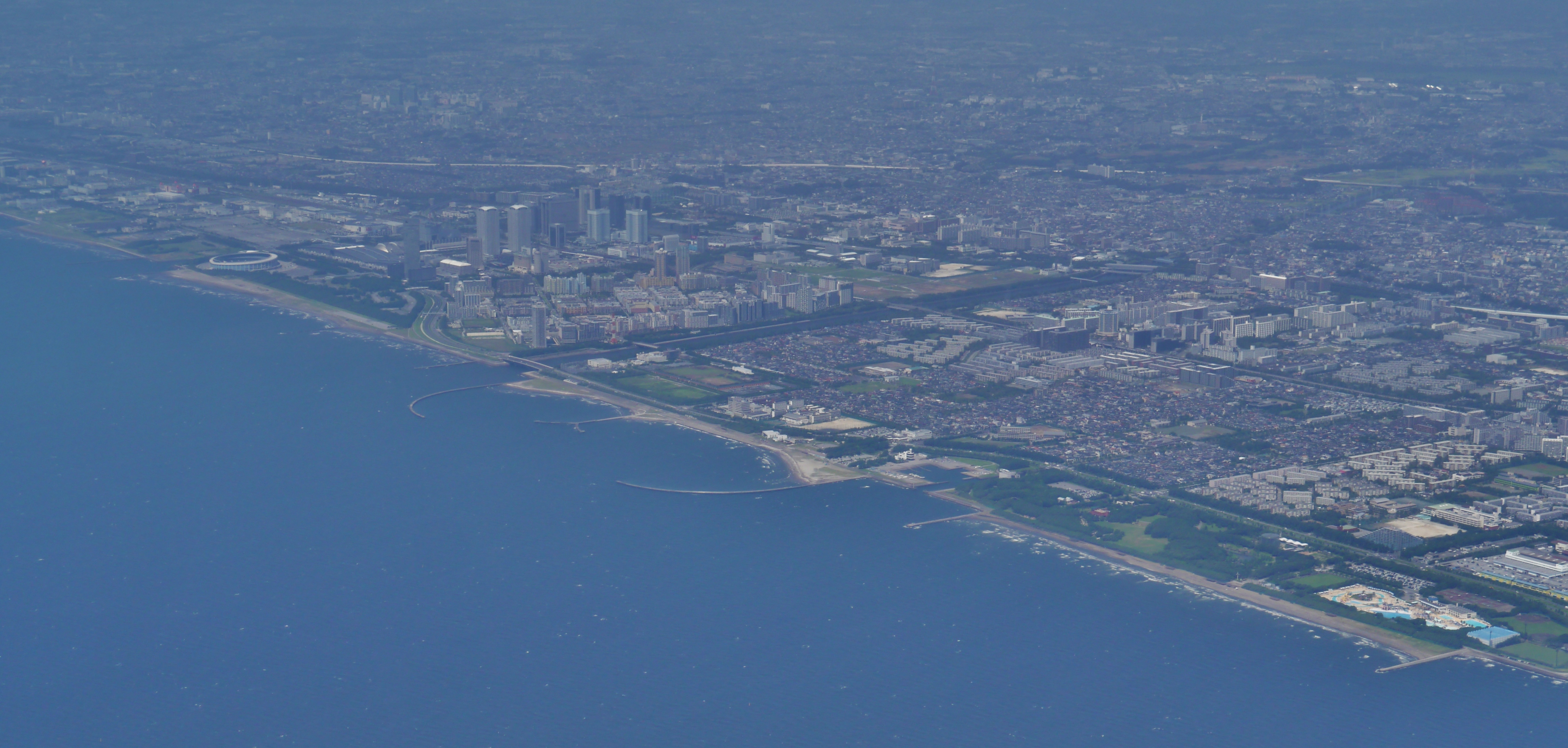
- Aerial view of Mihama

- Flag Seal

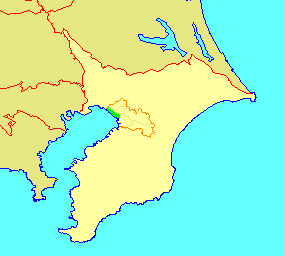
- Location of Mihama in Chiba

- Coordinates: 35°38′25″N 140°03′47″E
- Country: Japan
- Region: Kantō
- Prefecture: Chiba
- City: Chiba

Area
  - Total: 21.16 km^{2} (8.17 sq mi)

Population (April 2012)
  - Total: 149,314
  - Density: 7,060/km^{2} (18,300/sq mi)
- Time zone: UTC+9 (Japan Standard Time)
- Address: 5-15-1 Masago, Mihama-ku Chiba-shi, Chiba-ken; 261-0011
- Website: Official website of Mihama-ku

Mihama Ward (美浜区, Mihama-ku) is one of the six wards of the city of Chiba in Chiba Prefecture, Japan. As of April 2012, the ward had an estimated population of 149,314 and a population density of 7,060 persons per km^{2}. The total area was 21.16 km^{2}.

== Geography ==
Mihawa Ward is located in northwestern Chiba Prefecture, and consists entirely of reclaimed land from Tokyo Bay. As such, the area is flat, and portions are below sea level.

Mihama Ward within Chiba

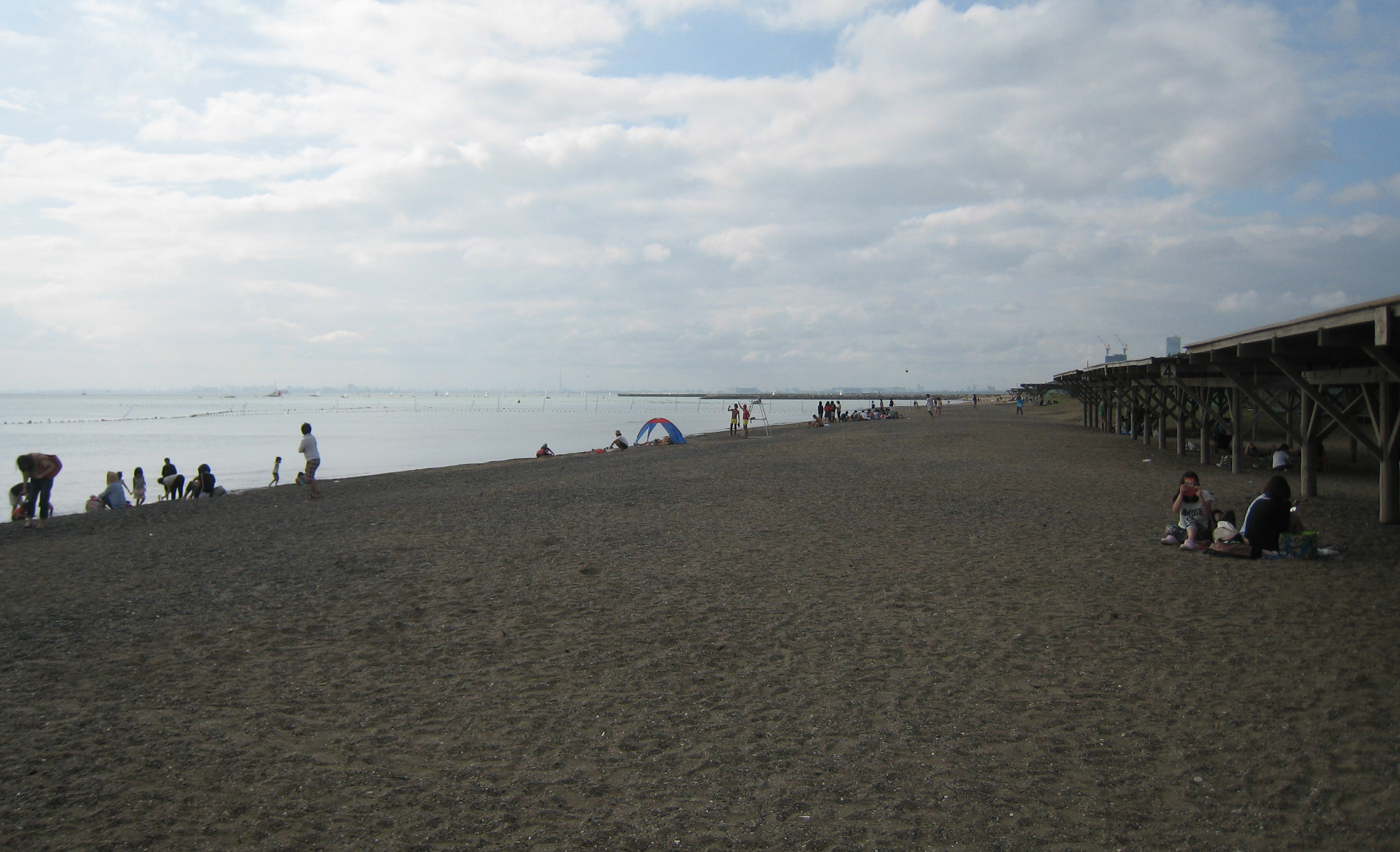
The Beach of Mihama-ku

=== Surrounding municipalities ===
- Hanamigawa Ward
- Chuo Ward
- Inage Ward
- Narashino, Chiba

== History ==
Being land formerly underwater, Mihama had no predecessor towns or villages before the reform of the old provincial system in 1872.

Reclamation of 19 kilometers of white sand beach and mudflats along the shore of Tokyo Bay began in 1912, with the construction of Japan's first civilian aerodrome. The site is commemorated today by the Inage Civil Aviation Commemoration Center. Following World War II, the expanding Tokyo Metropolis created a demand for additional factory locations and public housing. The development of the Kaihin New Town from 1969 to 1995 was one such project. With the promotion of Chiba to a designated city with additional autonomy from Chiba prefecture and the central government on April 1, 1992, Mihama Ward was created as an administrative unit.

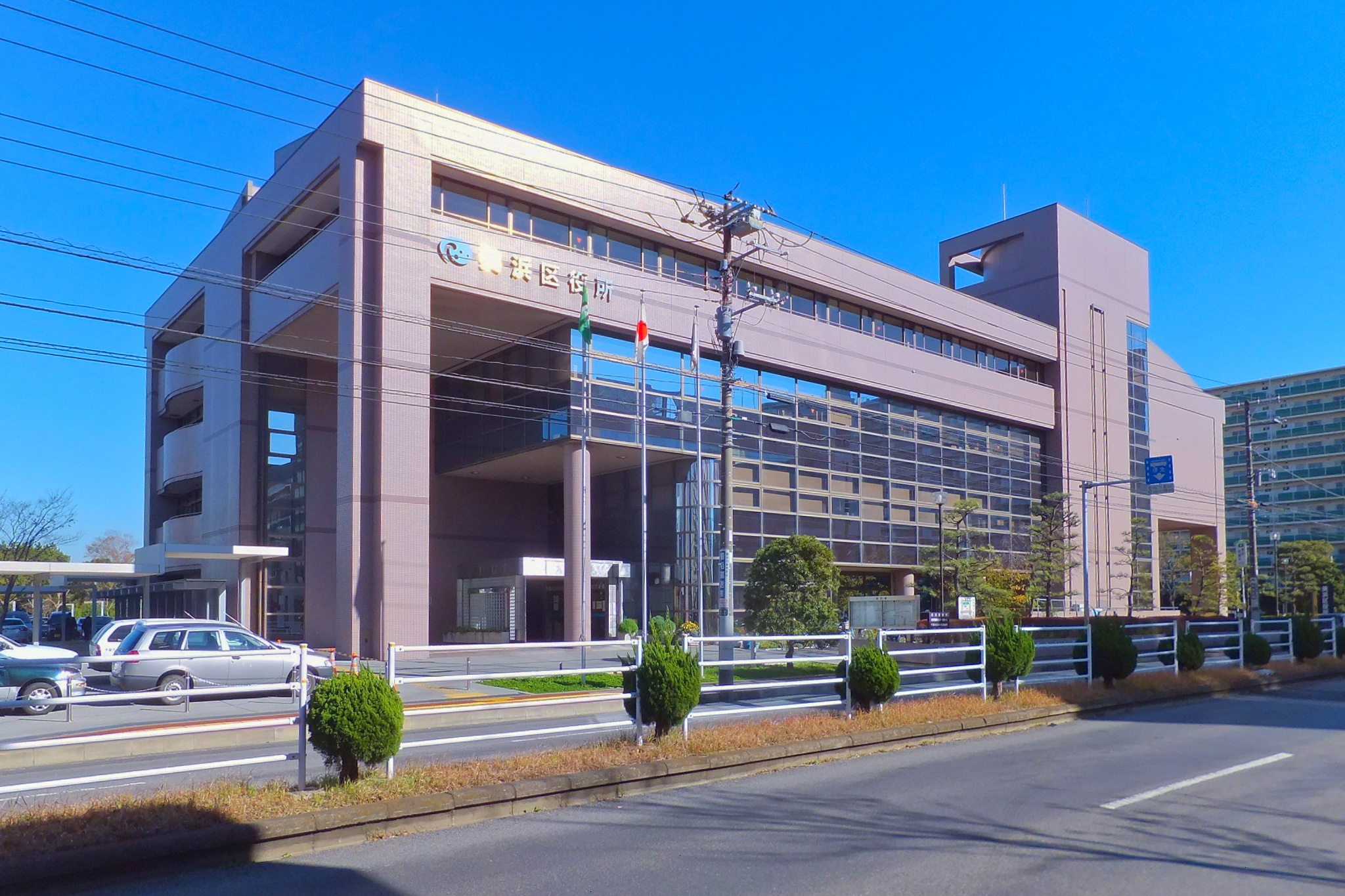
Mihama Ward Office (Dec 11, 2011)

== Economy ==
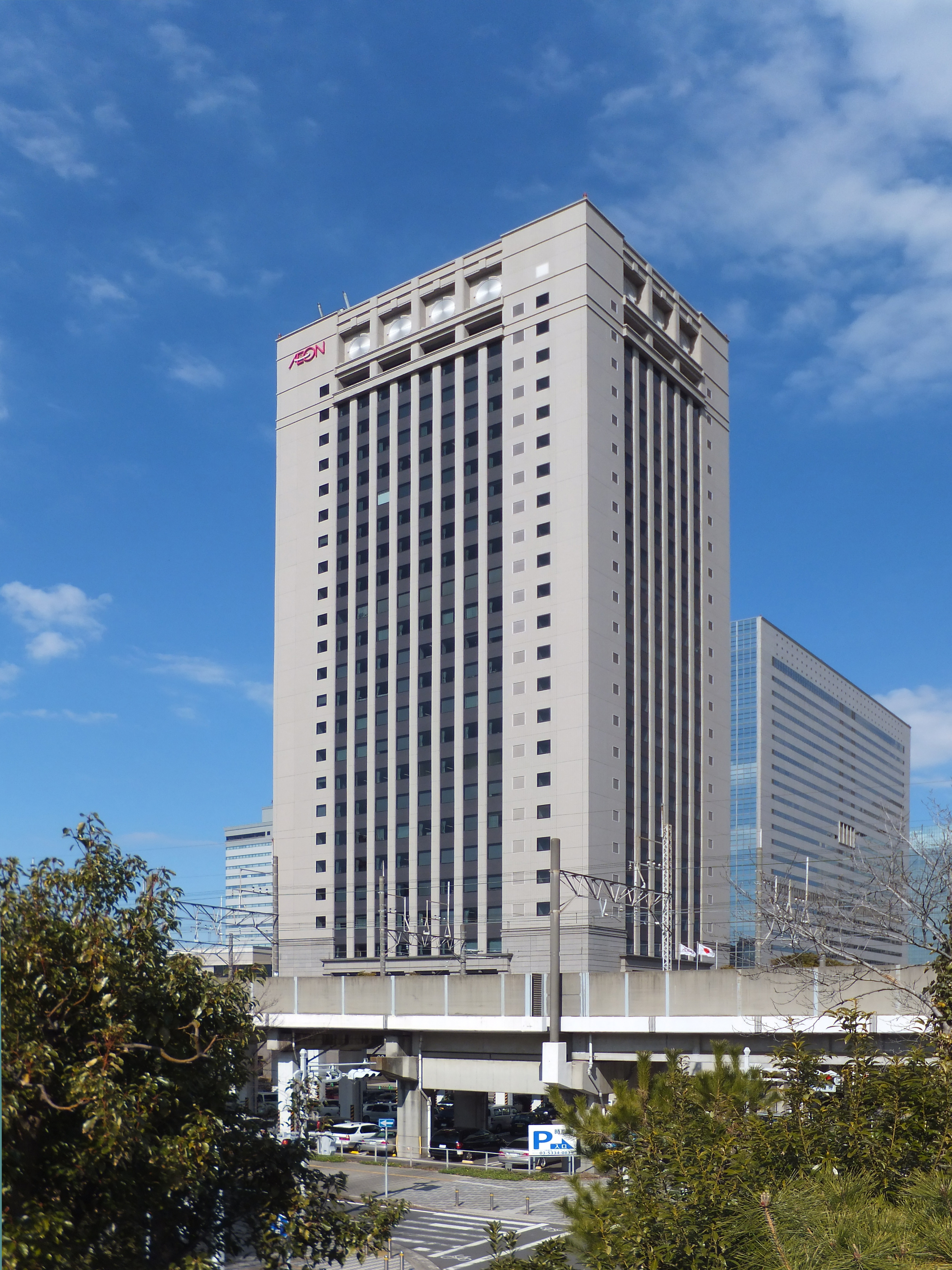
Aeon headquarters

Mihama Ward is largely a regional commercial center and bedroom community for central Chiba and Tokyo. The newly developed waterfront area of Kaihin Makuhari is in Mihama-ku.

Aeon, Seiko Instruments and several other companies are headquartered in the Makuhari business district of Mihama-ku. Japan's second largest convention center Makuhari Messe and Chiba Marine Stadium, the home ground of the Chiba Lotte Marines baseball team are located in Kaihin Makuhari.

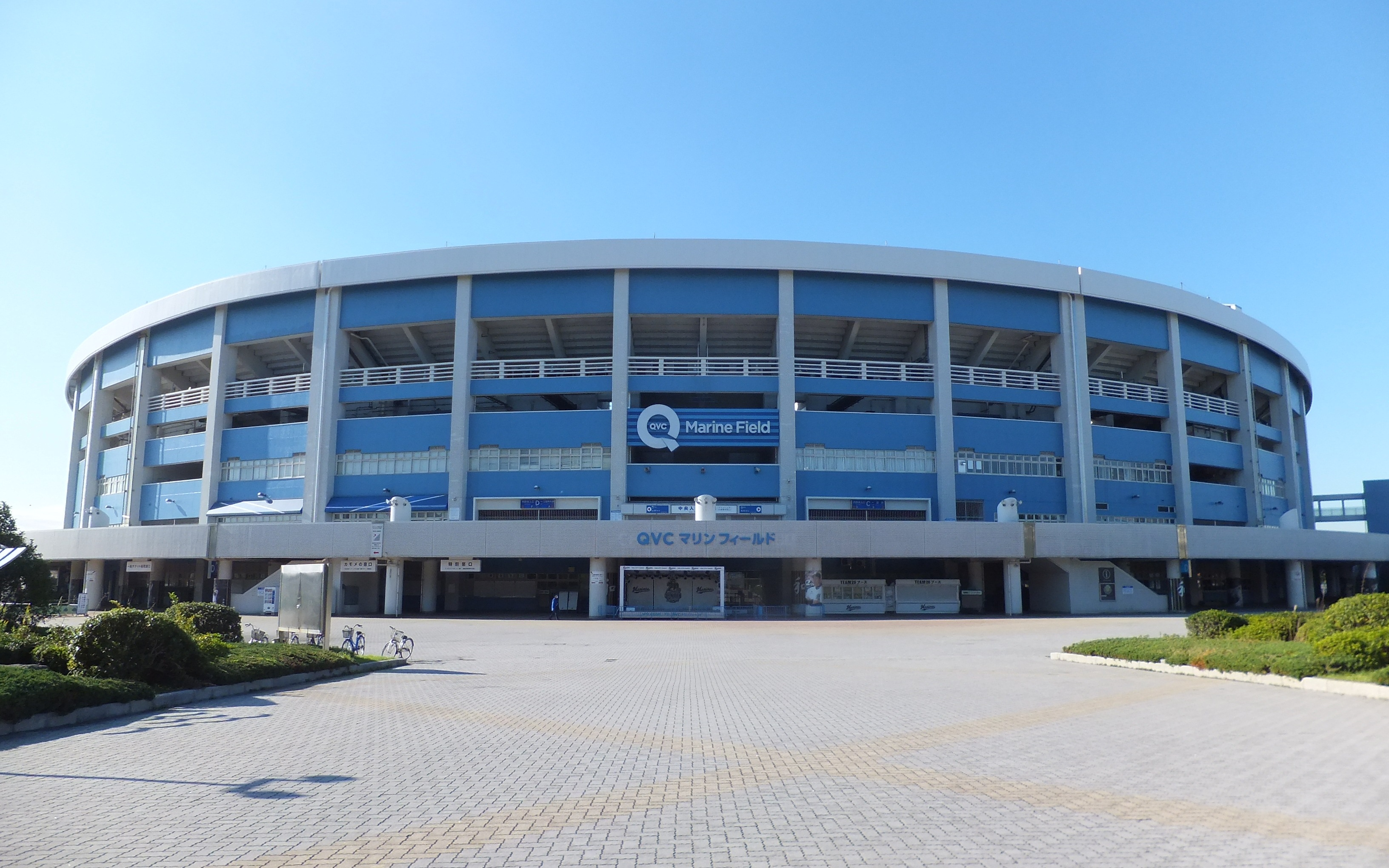
Chiba Marine Stadium

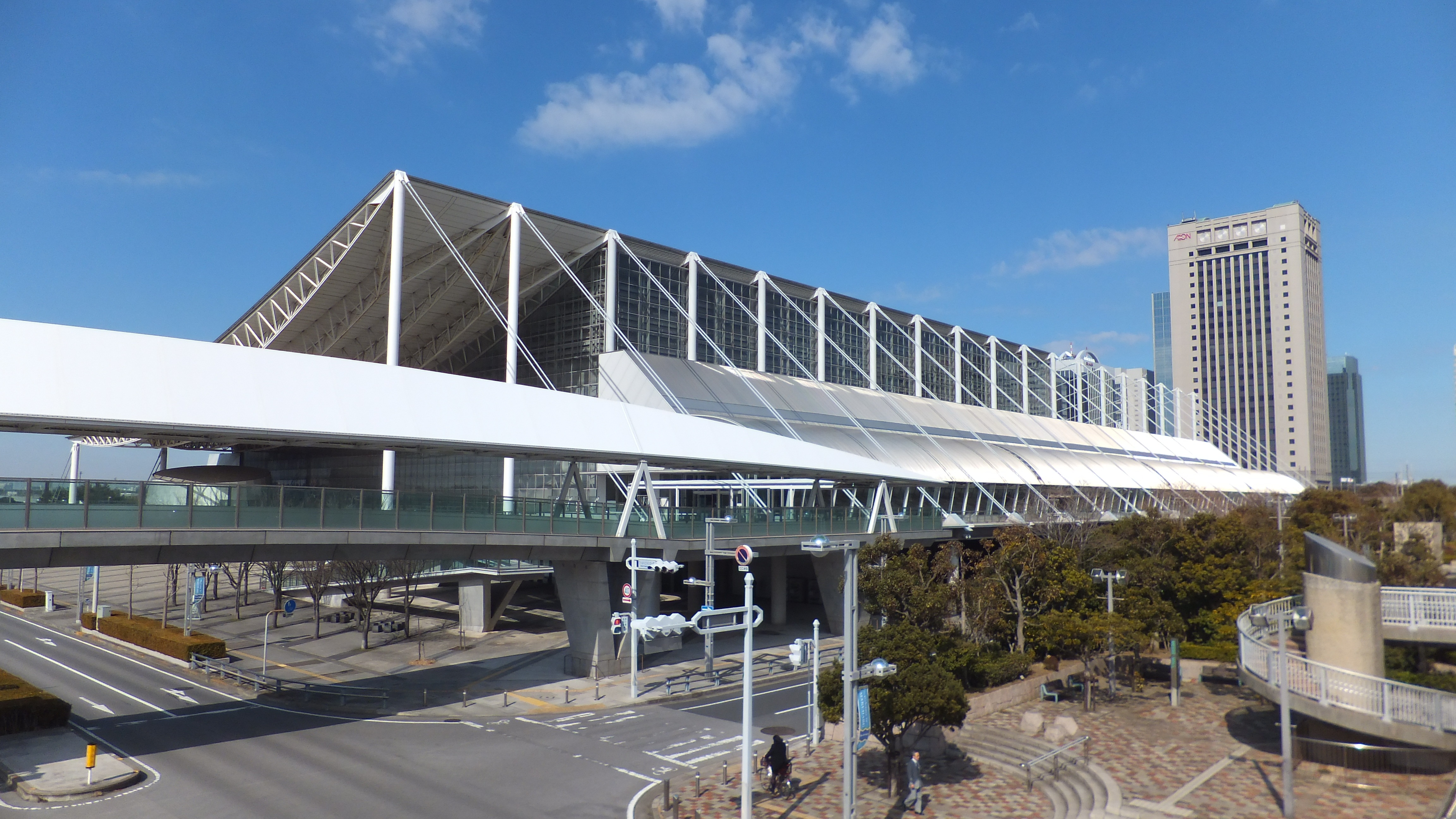
Exhibition Hall in Makuhari Messe

== Transportation ==
=== Railroads ===
- JR East – Keiyō Line
  - Makuharitoyosuna - Kaihimmakuhari - Kemigawahama - Inagekaigan

== Education ==
Universities and colleges

- Tokyo Dental College
- Kanda University of International Studies
- The Open University of Japan
- Chiba Prefectural University of Health Sciences

Municipal elementary and junior high schools, and one public high school in this ward (Inage Senior High School) are operated by the Chiba City Board of Education (千葉市教育委員会).

Municipal junior high schools:

- Inage Senior High School Affiliated Junior High School (稲毛高附属中学校)
- Inahama (稲浜中学校)
- Isobe (磯辺中学校)
- Makuhari Nishi (幕張西中学校)
- Masago (真砂中学校)
- Sawaicho No. 1 (幸町第一中学校)
- Sawaicho No. 2 (幸町第二中学校)
- Takahama (高浜中学校)
- Takasu (高洲中学校)
- Utase (打瀬中学校)

Former junior high schools

- Isobe No. 1 (磯辺第一中学校)
- Isobe No. 2 (磯辺第二中学校)
- Masago No. 1 (真砂第一中学校)
- Masago No. 2 (真砂第二中学校)
- Takasu No. 1 (高洲第一中学校)
- Takasu No. 2 (高洲第二中学校)

Municipal elementary schools:

- Kaihin Utase (海浜打瀬小学校)
- Inage No. 2 (稲毛第二小学校)
- Inahama (稲浜小学校)
- Isobe (磯辺小学校)
- Isobe No. 3 (磯辺第三小学校)
- Makuhari Nishi (幕張西小学校
- Masago No. 5 (真砂第五小学校)
- Masago Higashi (真砂東小学校)
- Masago Nishi (真砂西小学校)
- Mihama Utase (美浜打瀬小学校)
- Saiwaicho (幸町小学校)
- Saiwaicho No. 3 (幸町第三小学校)
- Takahama No. 1 (高浜第一小学校)
- Takahama Kaihin (高浜海浜小学校)
- Takasu (高洲小学校)
- Takasu No. 3 (高洲第三小学校)
- Takasu No. 4 (高洲第四小学校)
- Utase (打瀬小学校)

Former elementary schools:

- Isobe No. 1 (磯辺第一小学校)
- Isobe No. 2 (磯辺第二小学校)
- Isobe No. 4 (磯辺第四小学校)
- Masago No. 1 (真砂第一小学校)
- Masago No. 2 (真砂第二小学校)
- Masago No. 3 (真砂第三小学校)
- Masago No. 4 (真砂第四小学校)
- Saiwaicho No. 1 (幸町第一小学校)
- Saiwaicho No. 2 (幸町第二小学校)
- Saiwaicho No. 4 (幸町第四小学校)
- Takahama No. 2 (高浜第二小学校)
- Takahama No. 3 (高浜第三小学校)
- Takasu No. 1 (高洲第一小学校)
- Takasu No. 2 (高洲第二小学校)

Private schools:

- Makuhari Junior and Senior High School

== Noted people from Mihama Ward ==
- Michihiro Ogasawara, professional baseball player
- Mikiyo Ohno - singer
