= Kaihimmakuhari Station =

Railway station in Chiba, Japan

JE14 Kaihimmakuhari Station 海浜幕張駅
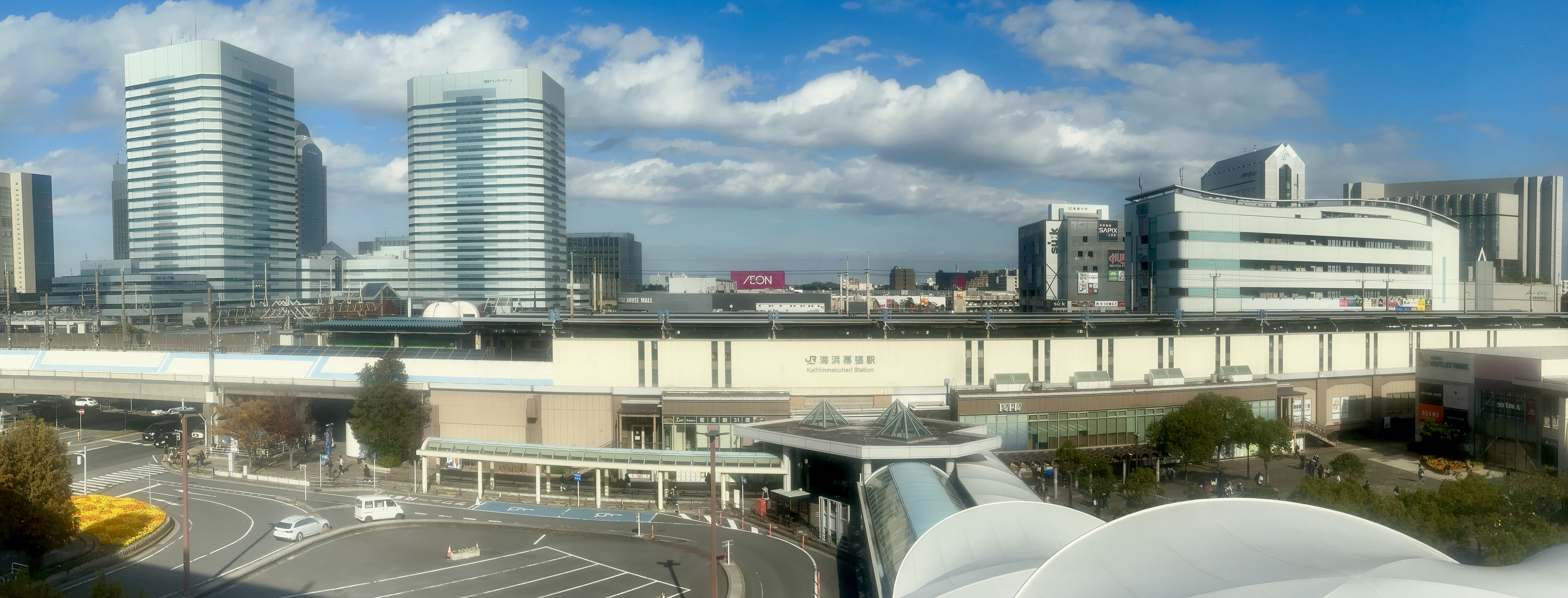
- The south entrance side in November 2025

General information
- Location: 2-110 Hibino, Mihama-ku, Chiba-shi, Chiba-ken 261-0021; Japan
- Coordinates: 35°38′54.0132″N 140°2′30.83″E
- Operator: JR East
- Line: Keiyō Line
- Distance: 31.7 km from Tokyo
- Platforms: 2 island platforms
- Tracks: 4
- Connections: Bus terminal

Construction
- Structure type: Elevated
- Cycle facilities: Yes
- Accessible: Yes

Other information
- Status: Staffed
- Station code: JE14
- Website: Official website

History
- Opened: 3 March 1986

Passengers
- FY2019: 68,111 daily

Services
| Preceding station | JR East | Following station |
|---|---|---|
| Tokyo Terminus | Wakashio (limited service) | Soga towards Awa-Kamogawa |
| Minami-Funabashi JE11 towards Tokyo | Keiyō Line Rapid | Kemigawahama JE15 towards Soga |
| Makuharitoyosuna JE13 towards Tokyo | Keiyō Line Local | Kemigawahama JE15 towards Soga |
| Makuharitoyosuna JE13 towards Ōmiya | Shimōsa | Terminus |
| Makuharitoyosuna JE13 towards Fuchūhommachi | Musashino Line Keiyō Line through-service | Terminus |
Location
- Location within Tokyo Keiyo area Location within Chiba Prefecture Location within Japan

Kaihimmakuhari Station (海浜幕張駅, Kaihin-makuhari-eki) is a passenger railway station located in Mihama-ku, Chiba City, Chiba Prefecture, Japan, operated by the East Japan Railway Company (JR East).

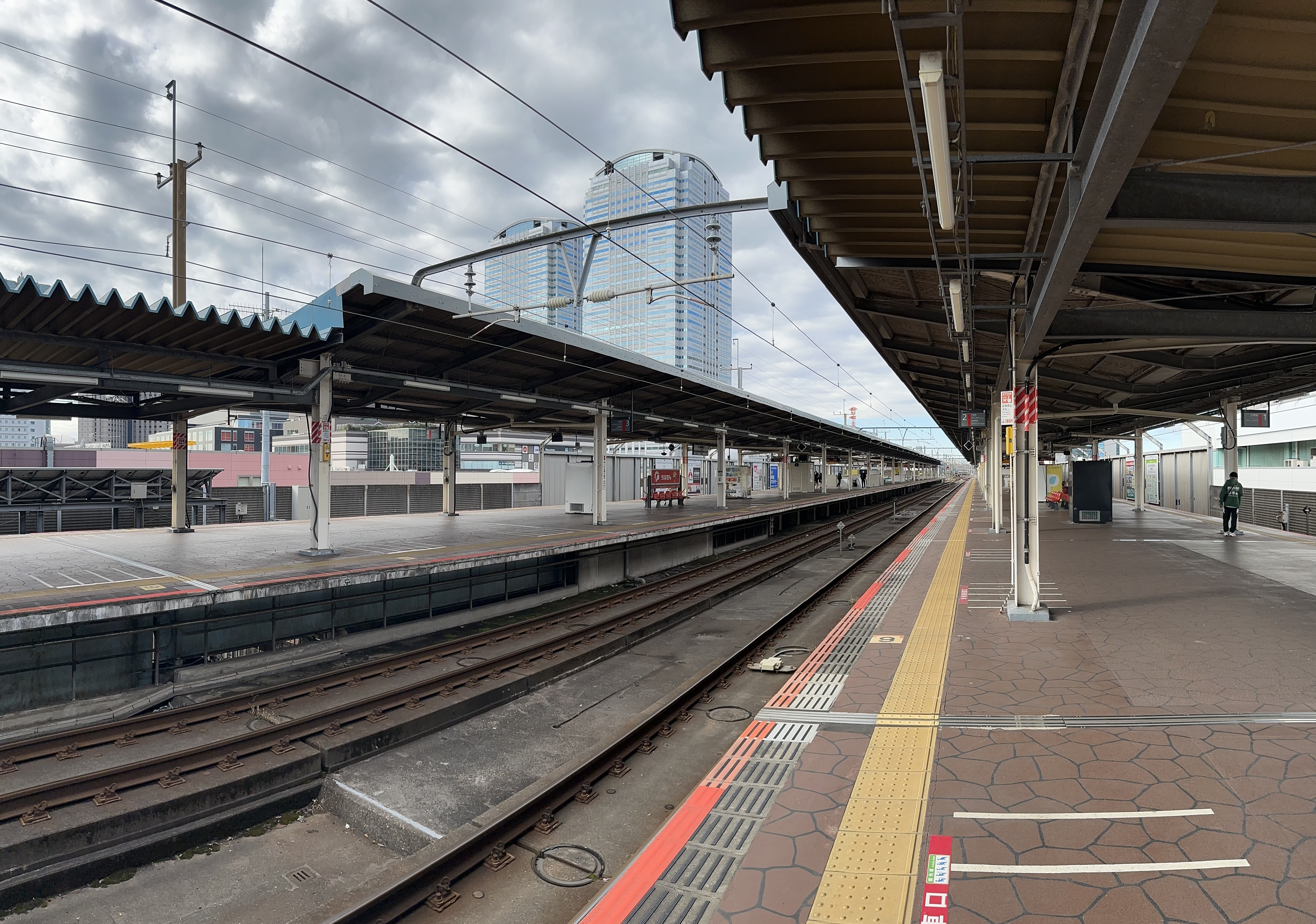
JR platforms, 2023

== Lines ==
Kaihimmakuhari Station is served by the Keiyō Line and is the turnaround point for many local trains to and from Tokyo Station. It is also served by Musashino Line trains to and from Fuchūhommachi during rush hours. It is 43.4 kilometers (27.0 mi) from the western terminus of the Keiyō Line at Tokyo Station.

Some Uchibō Line limited express Sazanami and some Sotobō Line limited express Wakashio services stop at this station. JR periodically offers additional limited express trains to Tokyo Station during major events at Makuhari Messe, such as the Tokyo Motor Show and CEATEC.

== Station layout ==
Kaihimmakuhari Station consists of two elevated island platforms serving four tracks. The station is staffed.

=== Platforms ===
| 1-2 | Keiyō Line | for Chibaminato, Soga, Kazusa-Ichinomiya, and Kimitsu |
| 2-3 | Musashino Line through service | for Nishi-Funabashi, Shim-Matsudo, and Fuchūhommachi |
| 2-4 | Keiyō Line | for Minami-Funabashi, Maihama, Shin-Kiba, and Tokyo |

Platforms 2 and 3 are used by stopping trains to allow non-stop trains to pass.

== History ==
Kaihimmakuhari Station opened on 3 March 1986. The station and all lines servering it were absorbed into the JR East network upon the privatization of JNR on 1 April 1987.

Station numbering was introduced in 2016 with Kaihimmakuhari being assigned station number JE13. With the opening of Makuharitoyosuna station on 18 March 2023, Kaihimmakuhari was reassigned station number JE14.

== Passenger statistics ==
In fiscal 2019, the station was used by an average of 68,111 passengers daily

| Fiscal year | Daily average |
|---|---|
| 2000 | 38,056 |
| 2005 | 48,813 |
| 2010 | 52,397 |
| 2015 | 63,225 |

== Surrounding area ==
Kaihimmakuhari Station is close to Makuhari new town which also received the Good Design Award. The following can also be found close to the station.

- Makuhari Messe convention centre
- Kanda University of International Studies
- Teikyo Heisei University Makuhari Campus
- Chiba College of Health Science Makuhari Campus
- The Open University of Japan
- Makuhari Junior and Senior High School
- Showa Gakuin Shuei Junior and Senior High School
- ZOZO Marine Stadium
- Wangan-Chiba IC of the Higashi-Kantō Expressway
- Hamada River

== Bus terminal ==
=== Highway buses ===
- Airport Limousine; For Narita International Airport (Keisei Bus, Chiba City Bus, Narita Airport Transport)
- Airport Limousine; For Haneda Airport (Airport Transport Service, Keihin Kyuko Bus, Keisei Bus, Chiba City Bus)
- For Suigo-Itako, Kashima Shrine, Kashimajingū Station (Kantō Railway)
- Strawberry Liner; For Gumyō Station, Narutō Station (Chiba Flower Bus)
- For Shisui Premium Outret (Chiba Flower Bus, Chiba Green Bus)
- For Fuji-Q Highland, Kawaguchiko Station (Keisei Bus, Fujikyu Yamanashi Bus)
- Yamato; For Tenri Station, Nara Station, Kintetsu-Kōriyama Station, Chūgū-ji, Hōryū-ji, and Goidō Station (Keisei Bus Nara Kotsu)
- For Ōtsu Station, Yamashina Station, Sanjō Station, and Kyōto Station (Chiba Chuo Bus)
- For Senri-Chūō Station, Shin-Ōsaka Station, Umeda Station, and Sannomiya Station (Keisei Bus)
- South Wave; For Sakaihigashi Station, Sakai Station, Izumigaoka Station, Wakayama Station, and Wakayamashi Station (Narita Airport Transport, Wakayama Bus)

=== Local bus services ===
| Stop No. | Japanese | Reading | For | Via | Operator |
|---|---|---|---|---|---|
| 1 | 幕01 | Makuharihongō 01 | Makuharihongō Station | Drivers License Center | Keisei Bus |
| 2 | 幕01 | Makuharihongō 01 | ZOZO Marine Stadium, Medical Center, and Makuhari Messe Central | | Keisei Bus |
| 3 | 幕22 | Makuharihongo 22 | Makuharihongō Station | KUIS and Columbus City | Keisei Bus |
| 3 | イオン65 | Aeon Mall 65 | Makuharitoyosuna Station | Aeon Mall Makuhari Shintoshin Aeon Style Entrance | Keisei Bus and Chiba City Bus |
| 3 | 海62 | Kaihimmakuhari 62 | Shintoshin Eigyōsho (Shintoshin Office) | | Keisei Bus |
| 4 | 海01 | Kaihimmakuhari 01 | Baytown loop line (Town Route) | | Keisei Bus |
| 4 | 海02 | Kaihimmakuhari 02 | Baytown loop line (Town Route) | | Keisei Bus |
| 4 | 海03 | Kaihimmakuhari 03 | Baytown loop line (Town Route) | | Keisei Bus |
| 4 | 海11 | Kaihimmakuhari 11 | Baytown loop line (Town Route) | | Keisei Bus |
| 5 | 海21 | Kaihimmakuhari 21 | Baytown loop line (Marine Route) | | Keisei Bus |
| 5 | 海22 | Kaihimmakuhari 22 | Baytown loop line (Marine Route) | | Keisei Bus |
| 5 | 海23 | Kaihimmakuhari 23 | Baytown loop line (Marine Route) | | Keisei Bus |
| 5 | 海31 | Kaihimmakuhari 31 | Baytown loop line (Marine Route) | | Keisei Bus |
| 5 | 海02 | Kaihimmakuhari 02 | Baytown loop line | High-tech Street | Keisei Bus |
| 5 | 海03 | Kaihimmakuhari 03 | Baytown loop line | High-tech Street | Keisei Bus |
| 5 | 海22 | Kaihimmakuhari 22 | Baytown loop line | High-tech Street | Keisei Bus |
| 5 | 海23 | Kaihimmakuhari 23 | Baytown loop line | High-tech Street | Keisei Bus |
| 5 | 海51 | Kaihimmakuhari 51 | Keisei Makuhari Station | High-tech Street | Keisei Bus |
| 5 | 海52 | Kaihimmakuhari 52 | Keisei Makuhari Station | (starting Kaihimmakuhari Station) | Keisei Bus |
| 6 | 海57 | Kaihimmakuhari 57 | Kaihimmakuhari Station | ZOZOPARK | Keisei Bus |
| 6 | 八千04 | Yachiyo 02 | Yachiyodai Station | Shin-Kemigawa Station | Keisei Bus |
| 7 | | | Makuhari Messe Central | | Chiba Seaside Bus |
| 7 | | | ZOZO Marine Stadium | | Chiba Seaside Bus |
| 7 | | | JR Makuhari Station | Ito Yokado | Chiba Seaside Bus |
| 7 | | | Hanamigawa-kuyakusho (Hanamigawa Ward Office) | JR Makuhari Station | Chiba Seaside Bus |
| 7 | | | Hanashima-koen (Hanashima Park) | JR Makuhari Station and Koyatsu | Chiba Seaside Bus |
| 7 | | | Hanashima-koen (Hanashima Park) | JR Makuhari Station and Hashido | Chiba Seaside Bus |
| 7 | | | Yachiyodai Station | JR Makuhari Station and Daiyon-chūgakkō (the 4th junior high school) | Chiba Seaside Bus |
| 7 | | | Yachiyodai Station | JR Makuhari Station and Hitachi | Chiba Seaside Bus |
| 7 | | | Hitachi | JR Makuhari Station | Chiba Seaside Bus |
| 7 | | | Makuharihongō Station | Makuhari 2-chōme | Chiba Seaside Bus |
| 7 | | | Makuhari-eki-iriguchi (Front of Makuhari Station) | The Open University | Chiba Seaside Bus |
South Entrance
| 1 | 海21 | Kaihimmakuhari 21 | Baytown loop line (Marine Route) | | Keisei Bus |
| 1 | 海22 | Kaihimmakuhari 22 | Baytown loop line (Marine Route) | | Keisei Bus |
| 1 | 海23 | Kaihimmakuhari 23 | Baytown loop line (Marine Route) | | Keisei Bus |
| 2 | 海01 | Kaihimmakuhari 01 | Kaihimmakuhari Station (Baytown loop line) | | Keisei Bus |
| 2 | 海02 | Kaihimmakuhari 02 | Kaihimmakuhari Station (Baytown loop line) | | Keisei Bus |
| 2 | 海03 | Kaihimmakuhari 03 | Kaihimmakuhari Station (Baytown loop line) | | Keisei Bus |
| 2 | 海11 | Kaihimmakuhari 11 | Kaihimmakuhari Station (Baytown loop line) | | Keisei Bus |
| 2 | 海21 | Kaihimmakuhari 21 | Kaihimmakuhari Station (Baytown loop line) | | Keisei Bus |
| 2 | 海22 | Kaihimmakuhari 22 | Kaihimmakuhari Station (Baytown loop line) | | Keisei Bus |
| 2 | 海23 | Kaihimmakuhari 23 | Kaihimmakuhari Station (Baytown loop line) | | Keisei Bus |
| 2 | 海31 | Kaihimmakuhari 31 | Kaihimmakuhari Station (Baytown loop line) | | Keisei Bus |

== See also ==
- List of railway stations in Japan
