= Kanda University of International Studies =

Higher education institution in Chiba Prefecture, Japan

Coordinates: 35°39′26.04″N 140°02′38.30″E

- 神田外語大学; Kanda Gaigo Daigaku
- Type: Private
- Established: 1987
- Undergraduates: 3,682
- Postgraduates: 30
- Location: Mihama-ku, Chiba, Chiba, Japan
- Website: www.kuis.ac.jp

Kanda University of International Studies (神田外語大学, Kanda Gaigo Daigaku) or KUIS is a private university located in Makuhari, Mihama-ku, Chiba, Japan. The university was founded in 1987 as an extension of Kanda Institute of Foreign Languages in Tokyo and is operated by Sano Educational Foundation. KUIS is a research university specializing in learner autonomy and is one of the top universities in Japan for international studies.

In the 2011 academic year, 3,682 undergraduates were enrolled; in the 2006 academic year, 30 postgraduates were enrolled.

== Departments ==
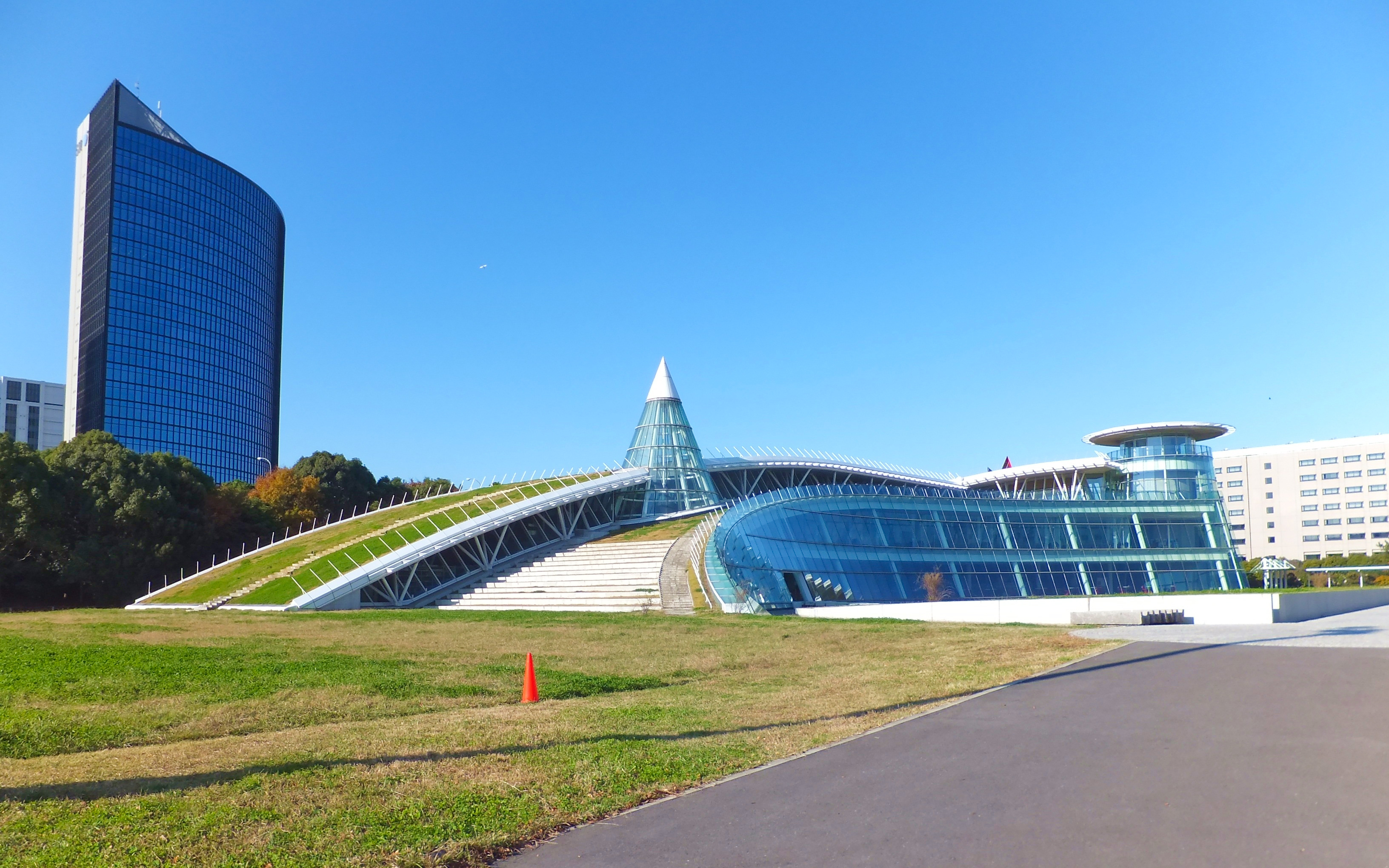
7th Building of campus

The university is divided into six departments, English being the largest. Other departments include Chinese, Spanish, Korean, International Communication, and Languages and Culture. The English Department is mostly made up of the English Language Institute (ELI), with over 60 native English-speaking limited-term non-faculty foreign lecturers as of autumn semester 2006.

The Graduate School of Language Sciences was founded 1992. It offers MA programs TESOL, in Japanese/English Linguistics, Japanese/English Pedagogy and English Communication Studies as well as a PhD in Linguistics. In 1996, the Graduate School was designated as a "Center of Excellence (COE)" by the Japanese Ministry of Education. In 2001, the Center for Language Sciences (CLS) was established to continue and deepen COE's research achievements.

== Courses ==
Students in International Communication study English, communications and computers, and students in Languages and Culture also study English and choose another language as their major from Spanish, Indonesian, Thai, Vietnamese, or Portuguese.

The Japanese Language and Culture Program began in 2000. It is designed to provide foreign students with intensive training in Japanese and to give them a general introduction to Japanese culture, literature and society. In 2006, there were over 180 international students in the program.

== Self-Access Learning Center ==
Established in 2001, the Self-Access Learning Center (SALC) employs 12 learning advisors from around the world who are specialists in learner autonomy and conducting 1-1 reflective dialogues with learners. This is achieved through the provision of spaces, resources, events and activities, courses in 'effective language learning', advising, peer support, and leadership opportunities and support for students.
