= Makuharitoyosuna Station =

Railway station in Chiba Prefecture, Japan

JE13 Makuharitoyosuna Station 幕張豊砂駅
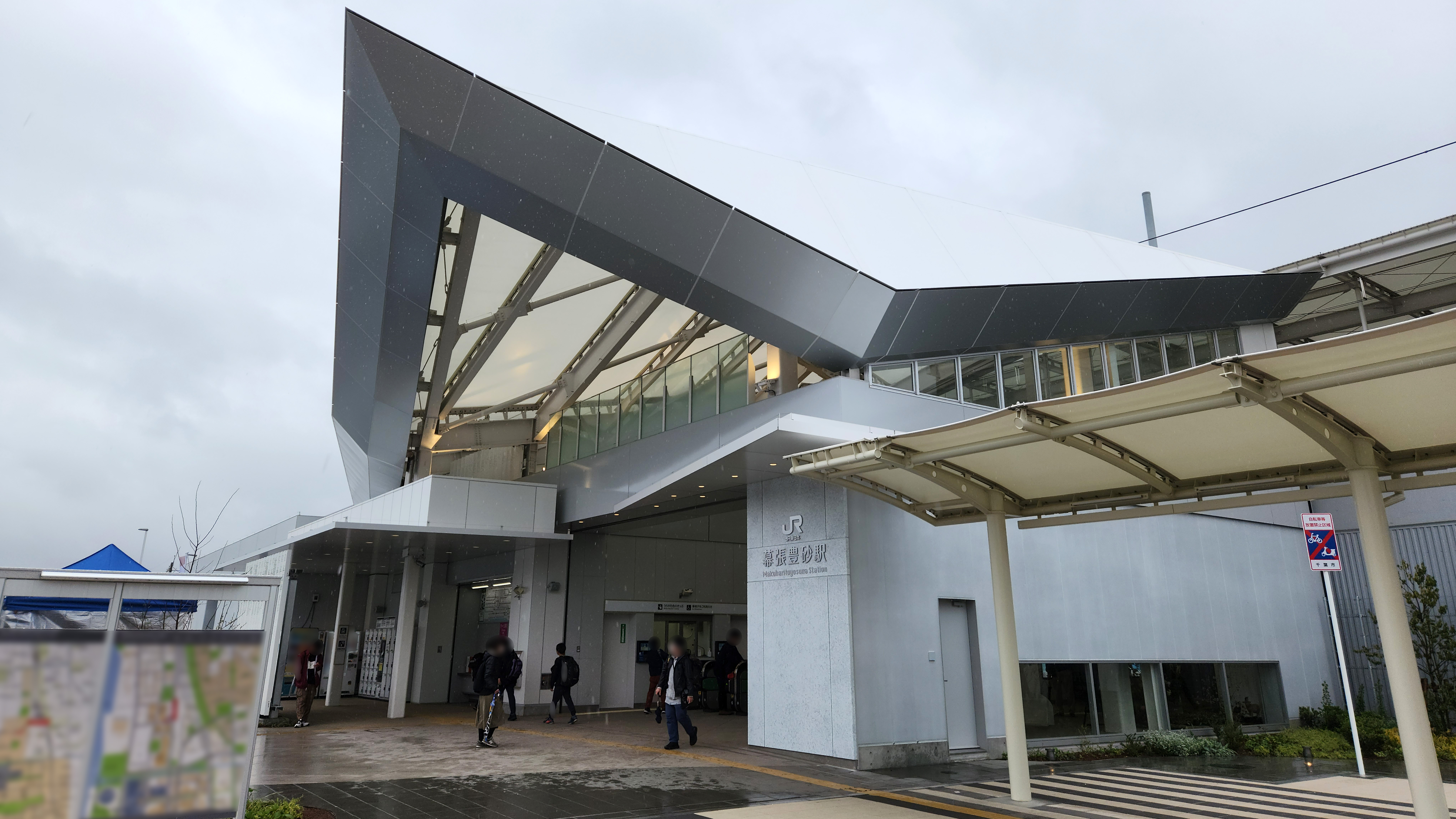
- The entrance to the station in March 2023

General information
- Location: 45-4, Hamada 2-chōme, Mihama-ku, Chiba, Chiba Prefecture; Japan
- Coordinates: 35°39′28.44″N 140°1′37.92″E
- Operator: JR East
- Line: Keiyō Line
- Distance: 30.0 km from Tokyo
- Platforms: 2 side platforms

Construction
- Structure type: Split platform
- Platform levels: 2
- Accessible: yes

Other information
- Station code: JE13

History
- Opened: 18 March 2023

Passengers
- 2023: 11,600 (daily)

Services
Preceding station	JR East	Following station
Shin-Narashino JE12 towards Tokyo	Keiyō Line Local	Kaihimmakuhari JE14 towards Soga
Shin-Narashino JE12 towards Ōmiya	Shimōsa	Kaihimmakuhari JE14 Terminus
Shin-Narashino JE12 towards Fuchūhommachi	Musashino Line Keiyō Line through-service	Kaihimmakuhari JE14 Terminus
Location
- Location within Tokyo Keiyo area Location within Chiba Prefecture Location within Japan

Makuharitoyosuna Station (幕張豊砂駅, Makuharitoyosuna-eki) is a train station in the city of Chiba, Chiba Prefecture, Japan.

It is close to the Makuhari Messe convention center and the Zozo Marine Stadium. It primarily serves to improve access to Aeon Mall Makuhari New City.

== Lines ==
- East Japan Railway Company
  - Keiyō Line

== Station layout ==
The station was built as a hybrid structure. The inbound platform for Tokyo is elevated, while the outbound platform bound for Soga is located at ground level.

=== Platforms ===
1	Keiyō Line	for Kaihimmakuhari, Chibaminato and Soga
2	Keiyō Line	for Maihama, Shin-Kiba, and Tokyo
2	Musashino Line through service	for Nishi-Funabashi, Shim-Matsudo, and Fuchūhommachi

== History ==
Makuharitoyosuna station was proposed as a provisionary station between Kaihimmakuhari Station and Shin-Narashino Station on the Keiyō Line in 1991. The proposal to JR East was made at the request of the Enterprise Bureau of Chiba Prefecture.

The station cost ¥11.5 billion (2020) (equivalent to ¥12.47 billion or US$82.38 million in 2024) to build, with retail chain AEON funding half of the construction costs.

Preliminary construction began in September 2022. The station was expected to open in Q2 2023, with the adjoining pedestrian facilities and hotels opening in 2024. Most of the construction work had been finished by September 2022. In December 2022, JR East finalized the opening of the station to take place on 18 March 2023. The station opened as planned on 18 March 2023.

== Surrounding area ==
- Aeon Mall Makuhari New City
- Costco Makuhari Warehouse
