= Lists of schools in Japan =

== By prefecture ==
- List of schools in Tokyo
  - List of elementary schools in Tokyo
  - List of junior high schools in Tokyo
  - List of high schools in Tokyo
  - List of municipal schools in Shinjuku
  - List of schools in Adachi, Tokyo
  - List of special education schools in Tokyo
- List of high schools in Chiba Prefecture
- List of junior high schools in Chiba Prefecture
- List of elementary schools in Chiba Prefecture
- List of junior high schools in Kanagawa Prefecture
- List of elementary schools in Kanagawa Prefecture
- List of junior high schools in Saitama Prefecture
- List of elementary schools in Saitama Prefecture

== By municipality ==
- List of schools in Narita, Chiba
- Tokyo is treated as a prefecture
  - List of schools in Adachi, Tokyo
  - List of municipal schools in Shinjuku (for Shinjuku City, Tokyo Metropolis)

== By type ==
- List of international schools in Japan
- List of single gender schools in Japan

== Official Japanese schools (certified by Japanese Government) ==
=== Public high schools ===
- Ehime Prefectural Uwajima Fisheries High School
- Fukui Prefectural School for the Deaf
- Fukui Prefectural School for the Visually Impaired
- Fukuoka Prefectural Fukuoka High School
- Hibiya High School
- Inagakuen Public High School
- Kanagawa Yokosuka High School
- Osaka Prefectural Kitano High School
- Saga Prefectural Saga Technical High School

=== Private high schools ===
- Azabu High School
- Chiben Gakuen (Campuses in Nara and Wakayama)
- Fukuoka Daiichi High School
- Friends Girls Junior & Senior High School
- Horikoshi High School
- Joshibi High School of Art and Design
- Kaisei Academy
- Keio Shonan-Fujisawa Junior and Senior High School
- Kobe Ryukoku Junior and Senior High School
- Musashi High School and Junior High School
- Nada High School
- Seien Girls' High School
- Tokai High School
- Yamamura International High School

== See also ==
- List of schools
- List of high schools in Japan
- List of universities in Japan
- Tokyo Metropolitan Government Board of Education
