= Honoka (given name) =

- Gender: Female

Origin
- Origin: Japanese
- Meaning: Different meanings depending on the kanji used

Honoka (written: 穂花, 穂香, 帆乃香, 穂之香 or ほの花) is a feminine Japanese given name. Notable people with the name include:

- Honoka (穂花; born 1982), Japanese television personality, writer and AV actress
- Honoka (wrestler) (炎華; born 2005), Japanese masked professional wrestler
- Honoka Aikawa (相川 暖花; born 2003), Japanese idol of the idol group SKE48
- Honoka Akimoto (秋本 帆華; born 1997), Japanese idol of the idol group Team Shachi
- Honoka Hagita (萩田 帆風; born 2000), Japanese former idol of the idol group Super Girls
- Honoka Hashida (橋田 歩果; born 2005), Japanese idol of the idol group Rosy Chronicle
- Honoka Hashimoto (橋本 帆乃香; born 1998), Japanese table tennis player
- Honoka Hayashi (林 穂之香; born 1998), Japanese women's footballer
- Honoka Hirao (平尾 帆夏; born 2003), Japanese idol of the idol group Hinatazaka46
- Honoka Hirotani (廣谷 帆香; born 2000), Japanese figure skater
- Honoka Inoue (井上 ほの花; born 1998), Japanese voice actress and singer
- Honoka Katayama (born 1998), formerly part of the ukulele musical duo Honoka & Azita
- Honoka Kishi (岸 帆夏; born 2004), Japanese former idol of the idol group Hinatazaka46
- Honoka Kobayashi (小林 穂夏; born 2001), Japanese kickboxer
- Honoka Kobayashi (小林 萌花; born 2000), Japanese idol of the idol group Beyooooonds
- Honoka Kuroki (黒木 ほの香; born 1995), Japanese voice actress and singer
- Honoka Mizuno (水埜 帆乃香; born 1995), Japanese former idol of the idol group SKE48
- Honoka Sasaki (佐々木 穂香), Japanese curler
- Honoka Tsutsumi (堤 ほの花), Japanese rugby sevens player
- Honoka Yahagi (矢作 穂香; born 1997), Japanese actress, fashion model and voice actress
- Honoka Yamamoto (山本 穂乃香; born 1998), Japanese former idol of the idol group Nogizaka46
- Honoka Yonei (born 1999), Japanese footballer
- Rin Honoka (ほのか りん; born 1996), Japanese actress and fashion model

== Fictional characters ==
- Honoka (ほのか), a character in the Dead or Alive video game series
- Honoka Aiura (相浦ほのか), a character in the manga Is My Reality a Love Game?
- Honoka Iwasaki (岩崎 ほのか), a character in the manga series Lucky Star
- Honoka Kawai (河合 ほのか), a character in the anime series The Girl Who Leapt Through Space
- Honoka Konoe (近衛 帆乃香), a character in the manga series UQ Holder!
- Honoka Kōsaka (高坂 穂乃果), protagonist of the idol franchise Love Live! School Idol Project
- Honoka Kurosaki (黒崎 ほのか), a character in the manga series Yama no Susume
- Honoka Maki (牧 穂乃香), a character in the anime series Kiznaiver
- Honoka Matsubara (松原 穂乃花), a character in the manga series Kin-iro Mosaic
- Honoka Mitsui (光井 ほのか), a character in the web novel series The Irregular at Magic High School
- Honoka Mutsu (陸奥ほのか), a character in the manga series Stella Women’s Academy, High School Division Class C³
- Honoka Sakurai (桜井 萌果), a character in the manga series Suzuka
- Honoka Sawada (澤田ほのか), a character in the manga series Horimiya
- Honoka Sawada (沢田 ほのか), protagonist of the manga series Chibi Devi!
- Honoka Takamiya (多華宮 仄), protagonist of the manga series Witchcraft Works
- Honoka Tamarai (玉来 ほのか), a character in the manga series ReLIFE
- Honoka Uehara (上原 穂香), a character in the visual novel True Tears
- Honoka Yukishiro (雪城 ほのか), co-protagonist of the anime series Futari wa Pretty Cure
