= Kamisato =

Kamisato may refer to:

== Places ==
- Kamisato, Saitama, Honshu, Kanto, Japan; a town
  - Kamisato Elementary School, Iwatsuki, Saitama, Kanto, Honshu, Japan; see List of elementary schools in Saitama Prefecture
- Kamisato, Nagano, Chuhu, Honshu, Japan; a village in the city of Iida
  - Kamisato Stop (train station), former name of the Ina-Kamisato Station
- Kamisato, Gunma District, Gunma, Kanto, Japan; a former village
- Kamisato, Tsukuba District, Ibaraki, Kanto, Japan; a former village

== People and characters ==
- Jody Kamisato (U.S. musician), the manager of Honoka & Azita
- Takeshi Kamisato (U.S. sportsman), 2005 yoyo world champion; see List of yo-yo world champions

=== Fictional characters ===
- Kamisato Ayaka and her brother Ayato, characters in the 2020 video game Genshin Impact
- Kakeru Kamisato, a fictional character from A Certain Magical Index; see List of A Certain Magical Index characters
- Saki Kamisato, a fictional character form Rascal Does Not Dream
- Yoshihiko Kamisato, a fictional character from Saekano; see List of Saekano characters
