= List of schools in Narita, Chiba =

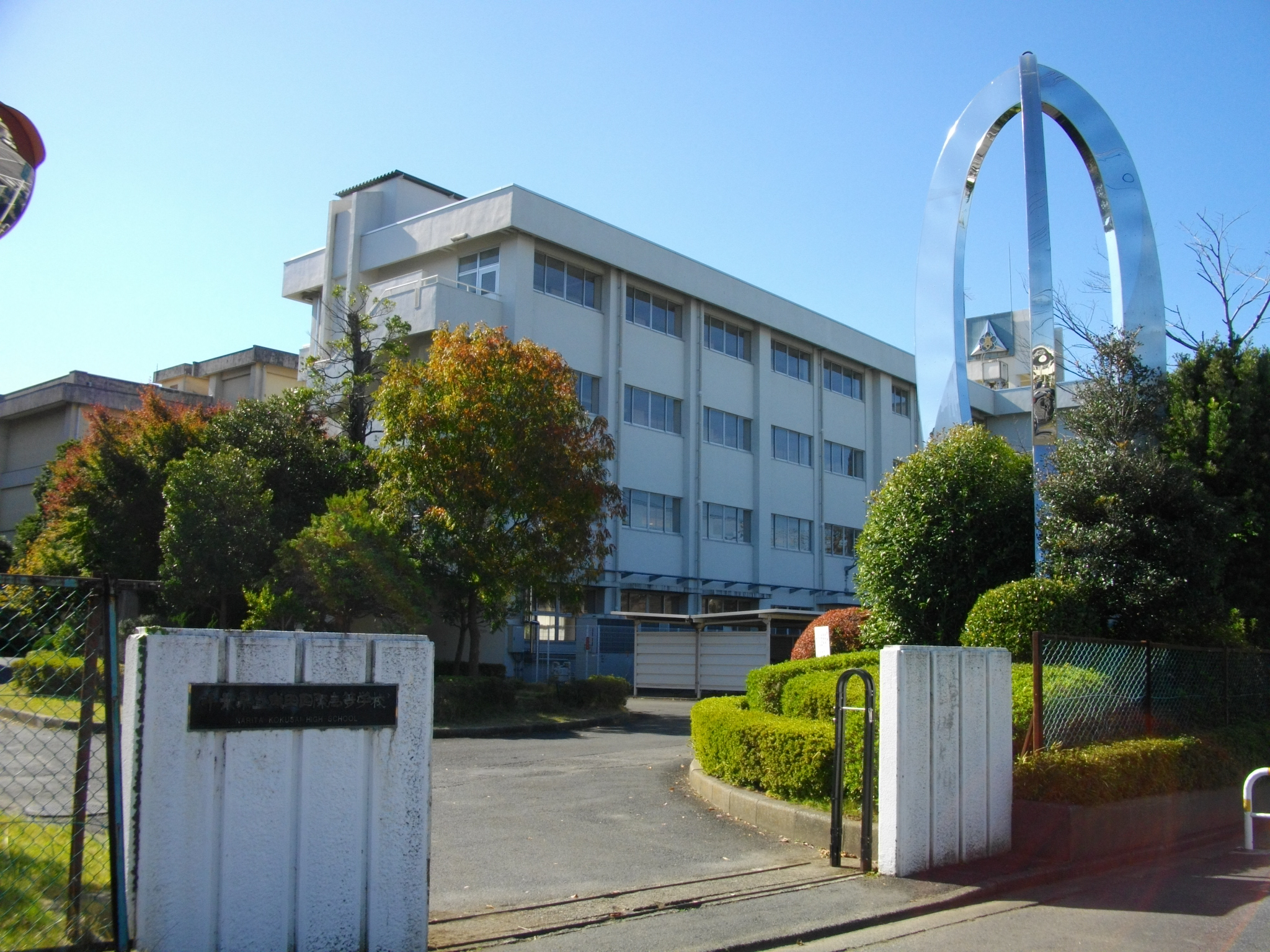
Narita Kokusai High School

This is a list of schools in Narita, Chiba Prefecture, Japan.

== Prefectural schools ==
The city has four public high schools operated by the Chiba Prefectural Board of Education.

- Narita North High School
- Narita Seiryo High School
- Shimofusa High School
- Narita Kokusai High School

== Municipal schools ==
The City of Narita Board of Education (成田市教育委員会) operates public elementary and junior high schools.

Municipal combined elementary and junior high schools:

- Shimofusa Midori Gakuen (下総みどり学園)
- Taiei Mirai Gakuen (大栄みらい学園)

Municipal junior high schools:

- Azuma (吾妻中学校)
- Kozunomori (津の杜中学校)
- Kusumi (久住中学校)
- Nakadai (中台中学校)
- Narita (成田中学校)
- Nishi (西中学校)
- Tamatsukuri (玉造中学校)
- Toyama (遠山中学校)

Municipal elementary schools:

- Azuma (吾妻小学校)
- Habu (八生小学校)
- Hashigadai (橋賀台小学校)
- Heisei (平成小学校)
- Honjo (本城小学校)
- Jinguji (神宮寺小学校)
- Karabe (加良部小学校)
- Kouzu (公津小学校)
- Kouzunomori (公津の杜小学校)
- Kuzumi (久住小学校)
- Misatodai (美郷台小学校)
- Mukoudai (向台小学校)
- Nakadai (中台小学校)
- Narita (成田小学校)
- Niiyama (新山小学校)
- Sanrizuka (三里塚小学校)
- Tamatsukuri (玉造小学校)
- Tohyama (遠山小学校)
- Toyosumi (豊住小学校)

== Private schools ==
- Narita Private Junior and Senior High School (成田高等学校・付属中学校)

== See also ==
- List of high schools in Chiba Prefecture
- List of junior high schools in Chiba Prefecture
- List of elementary schools in Chiba Prefecture
