= Rugby School Japan =

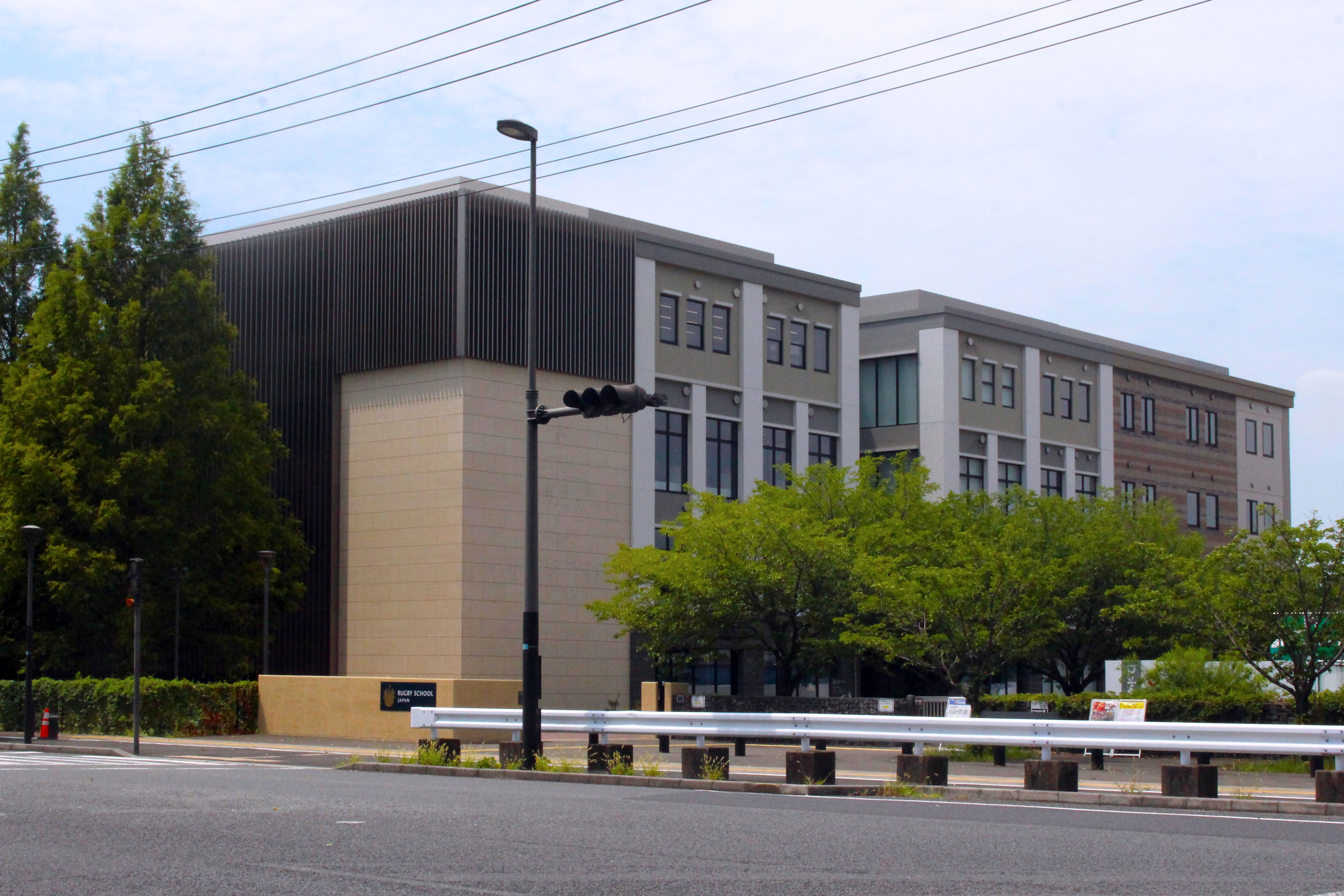
- Garden Campus at RSJ

Location
- Kashiwanoha, Chiba Prefecture, Japan; Kanto; 35°53′30″N 139°57′15″E

Information
- Other name: RSJ
- School type: British-private boarding school
- Motto: The Whole Person, The Whole Point
- Established: 2023
- Founder: Fei-Fei Hu (Founder & Chair of Directors, CEO of CEA)
- Sister school: Rugby School; Rugby School Thailand
- Principal: Tony Darby
- Years offered: Year 7-13
- Gender: co-education
- Age range: 11-18
- Enrollment: 400
- Capacity: 360 Boarding with 980 Total
- Average class size: 19
- Language: English
- Campus type: Urban area
- Accreditation: HMC; ISI; Council of British International Schools (COBIS)
- Alumni: Old Rugbeians
- Website: https://rugbyschooljapan.ed.jp/

Rugby School Japan, nicknamed RSJ, is a selective British private boarding school in Kashiwanoha, Chiba Prefecture, Japan. Opened in September 2023, RSJ is situated in a newly developing complex built by Mitsui Fudosan Group, strengthening on education, expansion, and more business opportunities within the Greater Tokyo Area.

The school is built in Kashiwanoha near Tokyo University's Kashiwa campus, which students have access to. RSJ is positioned on an expanding and sprawling complex. The school is the second international school established by the UK-based Rugby School, after Rugby School Thailand. RSJ offers the International General Certificate of Secondary Education (IGCSE) and A-levels to their students as part of the British curriculum they follow. The school is part of a trend of international boarding schools opening in Japan.

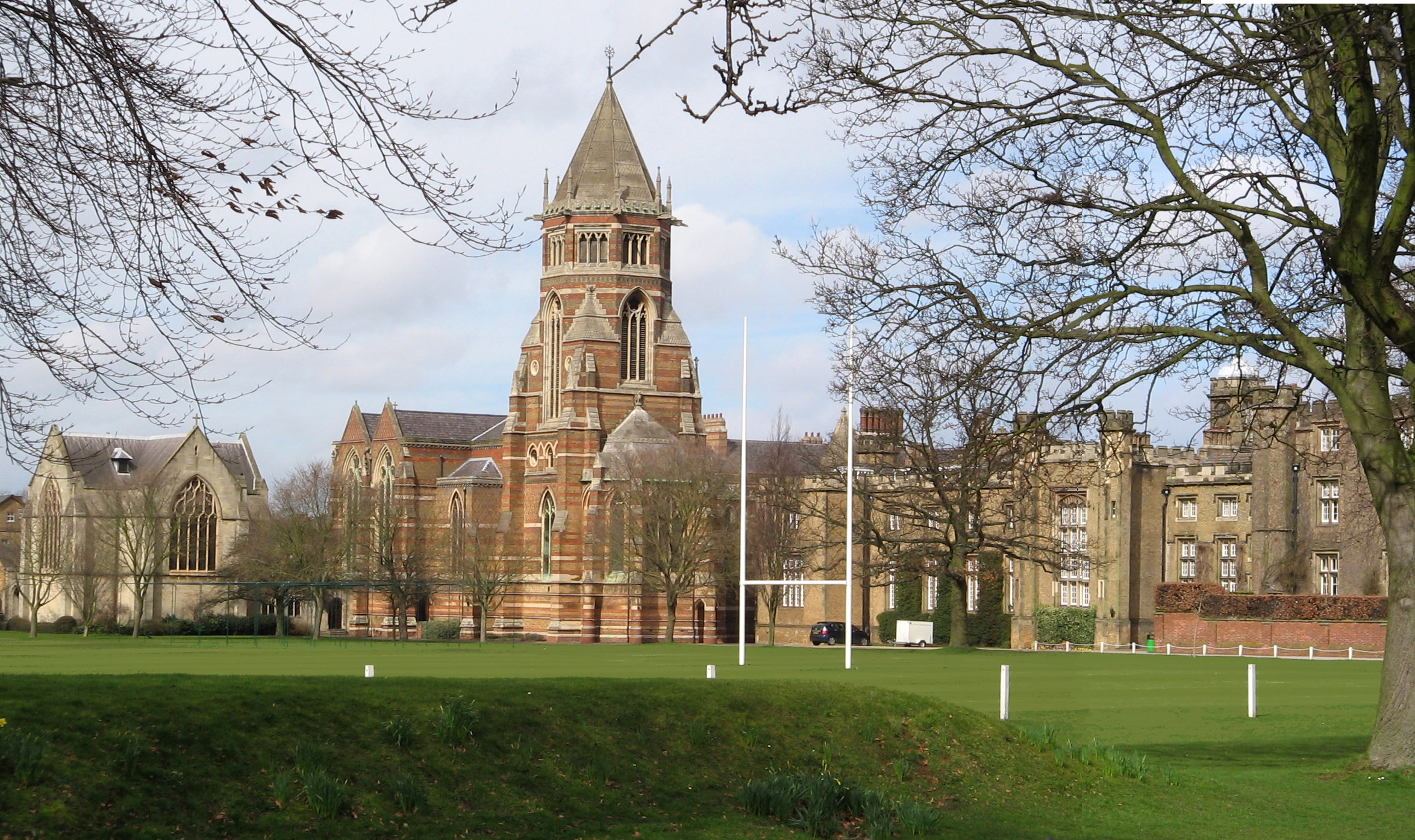
RSJ was established by the original school in the UK, the Rugby School, whom of which founded the globally recognised sport Rugby Football.

== Boarding ==
Rugby School Japan started with two boarding houses operating back in 2023, the School House and Rupert Brooke. In September 2024, two additional boarding houses, Tudor and Sheriff, were opened. Another pair of boarding houses, Southfield and Town has opened in late 2025, summing up a total of 6 houses across the institution.

Each boarding house is overseen by a housemaster or housemistress and their deputies. They are supported by non-residential teachers who contribute to the boarding environment. Boarders have access to school facilities and participate in a weekend activity program designed to help them engage with the surrounding Japanese environment.

Prior to opening, RSJ planned to accommodate approximately 780 students of both sexes, from grades equivalent to Japan’s sixth grade through the third year of high school. For its inaugural year, applications for 160 students were open and 140 students representing 16 countries were enrolled. As of May 2024, approximately 55% of the student population consists of weekly and full boarders.

The campus is in Kashiwa-no-ha City, a smart concept being developed by Mitsui Fudosan. It is within Chiba University.

== Pastoral care ==
At RSJ, all students and teachers belong to a house system, a community comprising approximately 70 day and boarding students. The House system plays a role in fostering school spirit and providing opportunities for leadership, mentoring, and teamwork. The Houses are named after their counterparts at Rugby School in the United Kingdom and are part of the school's community structure.

The school organises a range of house activities, including weekly sports competitions and events such as House Music, as part of an extracurricular program. These activities are designed to promote collaboration, camaraderie, and a sense of belonging among students and staff.

== Partnerships and accreditations ==
Rugby School Japan is accredited by and a member of the Council of British International Schools (COBIS) and was awarded ‘Beacon School’ status for student welfare.

Furthermore, the schools is reported to be a full member of the Head Master’s and Mistress’ Conference.

== Co-curricular activities ==
The school has co-curricular program that has over 55 activities, covering a range of sports, academics, chess, debating, and arts.

These after school activities consist of:

Sports

- Rugby (boys’ & girls’ teams)
- Football / soccer
- Basketball
- Tennis
- Swimming
- Badminton
- Hockey
- Netball
- Baseball (via local facilities)
- Rowing and other water sports (via local facilities)

Academic & Intellectual Clubs

- Debating / Public Speaking
- Model United Nations (MUN)
- Chess
- Mathematics Club / Maths Olympiad support
- Linguistics Club
- Book / reading clubs
- Finance / Investment club
- STEM / science enrichment clubs
- Biology Society and science‑based clubs
- House newspaper / media activities
- Academic competitions (national & international)

Arts & Creative Activities

- Drama / Theatre (acting & stage productions)
- Dance (studio classes & performances)
- Music ensembles (orchestra, jazz band, choirs)
- Rock band / contemporary music groups
- Visual arts clubs (painting, printmaking, sculpture)
- Photography and photography competitions
- Set design / technical theatre support
- Creative writing / literature clubs
- House recitals and performances

Leadership, Personal Development & Service

- Duke of Edinburgh’s International Award programme
- Outdoor education (camping, leadership expeditions)
- Cooking session
- Community service and ecological/green clubs
- House systems activities and competitions (e.g., House Music, house sports)

== See also ==
- List of high schools in Chiba Prefecture
- List of junior high schools in Chiba Prefecture
