= List of high schools in Chiba Prefecture =

This is a list of high schools in Chiba Prefecture.

== Prefectural ==
- Awa Takushin High School (JA)
- Chiba High School
- Narita North High School
- Narita Seiryo High School
- Shimofusa High School
- Narita Kokusai High School
- Kashiwanoha High School

== Municipal ==
- Inage Senior High School (Chiba)

== Private ==
- Ichikawa Gakuen Junior and Senior High School
- Makuhari Junior and Senior High School
- Narita Private Junior and Senior High School (成田高等学校・付属中学校)
- Reitaku Junior and High School
- Rugby School Japan

== See also ==
- List of junior high schools in Chiba Prefecture
- List of elementary schools in Chiba Prefecture
- List of schools in Narita, Chiba
