= Makuhari International School =

Coordinates: 35°38′53.5″N 140°2′57.06″E

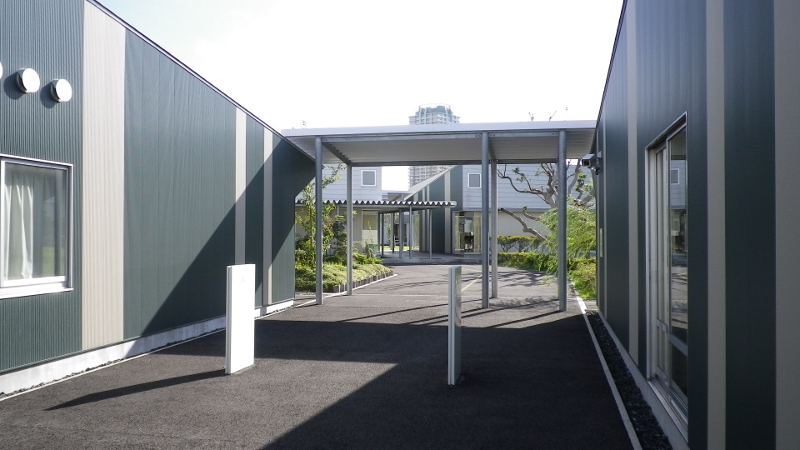
- 3-2-9 Wakaba, Mihama-Ku, Chiba City, Chiba 261-0014; Japan

Information
- Established: 2009
- Head of school: Trent Citrano
- Faculty: Registered educators from the UK, US, Canada, Australia, New Zealand, Sri Lanka, Philippines, India, and Japan
- Grades: Kindergarten to Grade 6
- Enrollment: Approx. 300
- Colors: Green and Yellow
- Accreditation: Tokyo Association of International Preschools, Authorized by the Ministry of Education, Culture, Sports, Science and Technology of Japan, Council of International Schools,
- Website: www.mis.ed.jp

Makuhari International School (幕張インターナショナルスクール) is a private international school located in Wakaba, Mihama-ku, Chiba in Chiba Prefecture, Japan, accepting children from age 3 to 12 in grades K-6. The school caters primarily to Japanese returnees, dual nationality and foreign children moving to this part of Japan. It is the first international primary school in Japan to be recognized as a school under Article 1 of the School Education Law. As a school based on Article 1, the school is eligible for assistance under the Private School Law and the Private School Promotion Assistance Law. The school basically follows the Japanese curriculum, but all courses are completely taught in English except for Japanese language and culture subjects. Other content and objectives have been added from other curricula mainly from the United Kingdom.

== Overview ==
Makuhari International School is run by Makuhari International School Foundation, with an appointed school board, head of school, senior management team, and a leadership group running the school's day-to-day operations.

=== Facilities ===
The school's facilities are located at Makuhari New City Academic Zone in Wakaba, Mihama Ward, Chiba City on an area of 15,000 m2. The complex is primarily wooden, one story with a total area of 3,800 m2. The school buildings, primarily designed by Coelacanth and Associates, received an award from the Architectural Institute of Japan in 2011.

== History ==
Historically, international schools in Japan have not been classified as schools but as "specialty institutions, in the same category as cram schools, language conversation schools, driver’s education schools, and so on." This has caused problems for students transferring from an international to a regular Japanese school, since their education was not fully recognized under Japanese law. In the 1990s, Chiba Prefecture and Chiba City began making plans for an international school in the Makuhari area in hopes of attracting foreign businesses. In 2006, as a first step in creating the Makuhari International School as a school integrated into the Japanese school system, the prefecture designated the area a "Special Education Zone" (kyōiku tokku) in order to allow an international school to more flexibly follow the curriculum prescribed under Japanese law. The budget for starting the school was ¥1.4 billion and was supplied by Chiba Prefecture, Chiba City, and private business. The school opened in April 2009 with 170 students.

=== Timeline ===
- May 2006: Application and authorization for Special Zone status
- October 2007: Submission and approval of school establishment plan and formation of Makuhari International School Foundation
- Spring 2008: Construction of school facilities
- Fall 2008: Acceptance and enrollment of new students
- April 2009: School opens

== See also ==
- Education in Japan
- List of junior high schools in Chiba Prefecture
- List of elementary schools in Chiba Prefecture
