= Beyooooond1st =

Studio album by Beyooooonds
- Released: November 27, 2019
- Language: Japanese
- Label: Zetima

Beyooooonds chronology
Beyooooond1st (2019)	Beyooooo2nds (2022)

Beyooooond1st is the debut studio album from Japanese girl group Beyooooonds. It was released on November 27, 2019 by Zetima and consists of seventeen tracks.

== Track listing ==
Beyooooond1st track listing
No.	Title	Lyrics	Music	Arrangements	Length
1.	"Oooooverture"		Yusuke Kato	Yusuke Kato	1:18
2.	"Atsui!" (アツイ!)	Sho Hoshibe	Sho Hoshibe	Yasuo Asai	4:29
3.	"Nippon no DNA!" (ニッポンノD・N・A!)	Toru Nozawa	Sho Hoshibe	Sho Hoshibe	4:13
4.	"Takanawa Gateway Eki ga Dekiru Koro ni wa" (高輪ゲートウェイ駅ができる頃には; performed by Chica#Tetsu)	Sho Hoshibe	Sho Hoshibe	Nobuyuki Shimizu	4:35
5.	"We Need a Name!" (performed by Miyo Hirai, Honoka Kobayashi, Utano Satoyoshi)	Sho Hoshibe	Sho Hoshibe	Yasuaki Maejima	3:56
6.	"Sokora no Yatsu to wa Onaji ni Saretakunai" (そこらのやつとは同じにされた; performed by Ame no Mori Kawa Umi (雨ノ森 川海))	Kanon Fukuda	Seiko Oomori	Hamada Pierre Yusuke	3:47
7.	"Kinoko Takenoko Daisenki" (きのこたけのこ大戦記)	Kenichi Maeyamada	Kenichi Maeyamada	Kenichi Maeyamada, Mitsuki Tokuda	6:10
8.	"Sayokyoku "Megane no Otoko no Ko"" (小夜曲"眼鏡の男の子")		Sho Hoshibe	Yusuke Kato	1:29
9.	"Megane no Otoko no Ko" (眼鏡の男の子)	Sho Hoshibe	Sho Hoshibe	Kaoru Okubo	4:49
10.	"Koi no O-Swing" (恋のおスウィング)	Ameko Kodama	Sho Hoshibe	Atsushi Umeguchi	4:05
11.	"Bunkasai Jikkō Iinchō no Koi" (文化祭実行委員長の恋)	Sho Hoshibe	Sho Hoshibe	Yusuke Itagaki	5:28
12.	"Gannen Bungee Jump" (元年バンジージャンプ)	Sho Hoshibe	Sho Hoshibe	Sho Hoshibe	4:21
13.	"Renai Bugyō" (恋愛奉行)	Yoshiko Miura	Sho Hoshibe	Kaoru Okubo	4:16
14.	"Girl Zone" (performed by Ame no Mori Kawa Umi (雨ノ森 川海))	Seiko Oomori	Seiko Oomori	Kaoru Okubo	4:33
15.	"Toei Oedo Sen no Roppongi Eki de Dakishimete" (都営大江戸線の六本木駅で抱きしめて; performed by Chica#Tetsu)	Sho Hoshibe	Sho Hoshibe	Nobuyuki Shimizu	3:49
16.	"Go Waist"	Ameko Kodama, Henri Belolo, Victor Edward Willis	Jacques Morali	Kaoru Okubo	4:21
17.	"Nobishiro ~Beyond the World~" (伸びしろ～Beyond the World～)	Sho Hoshibe	Sho Hoshibe	Shunsuke Suzuki	5:55

== Charts ==
Chart performance for Beyooooond1st
Chart	Peak position
Japanese Albums (Oricon)	3
Japanese Hot Albums (Billboard Japan)	6
