= Chiba Korean Primary and Junior High School =

North Korea-affiliated school in Japan

- 千葉朝鮮初中級学校 치바 조선 초중급학교

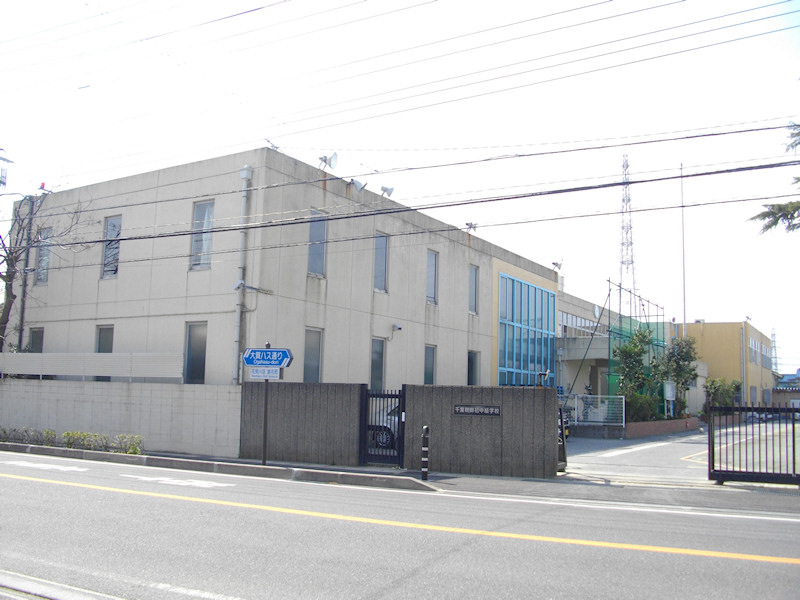
- The school in 2014

Location
- 965 Naniwa-chō, Hanamigawa-ku; Chiba Prefecture; Chiba, 262-0024; Japan; 35°39′28″N 140°04′08″E

Information
- Type: Private Korean international school
- Established: 1946; 80 years ago
- School board: Chiba Korean Educational Foundation
- Grades: Primary and junior high school
- Enrollment: 30 (2025)
- Language: Korean
- Website: chibahakkyo.net

Chiba Korean Primary and Junior High School (千葉朝鮮初中級学校 Chiba Chōsen Shochūkyūgakkō, Korean: 치바 조선 초중급학교) is a North Korea-aligned Korean international school in Hanamigawa-ku, Chiba, Chiba Prefecture, Japan, in the Tokyo metropolitan area. As of 2014, the principal is Kim Yu-sop. The school uses the Korean language as its language of instruction. The school operates under the authority of the Chongryon.

== History ==
The school first opened in the 1940s. Historically the Chongryon provided most of the school's funding. It previously received some funding from the North Korean central government, and an additional 20% of its budget came from Japanese government subsidies. When the North Korean government received United Nations sanctions its funding stopped.

== Student body ==
As of 2025, it had 20 primary school and 10 middle school students.

== See also ==
- List of junior high schools in Chiba Prefecture
- List of elementary schools in Chiba Prefecture
