= Junichiro Ito =

Juichiro Ito
- Born: 1954 (age 71–72); Tokyo, Japan
- Education: Chiba University
- Scientific career
- Fields: Medicine
- Workplaces: National Institute of Mental Health, Japan

Junichiro Ito (伊藤 順一郎, Itō Jun'ichirō; born 1954) is a Japanese medical researcher and a psychiatrist. He is currently the director of the Department of Psychiatric Rehabilitation, National Institute of Mental Health, Japan. Ito's research interests include Assertive Community Treatment and assistance programs for socially withdrawn individuals, called hikikomori.

== Biography ==
Ito was born in Tokyo in 1954. He graduated from the faculty of Medicine at the Chiba University with the degree of Bachelor of Medicine in 1980.

He was, then, appointed to Assistant (equivalent to Assistant Professorship in North America) of the Department of Psychiatry at the Chiba University Hospital in 1984. He further became an Assistant of the Department of Psychiatry at the School of Medicine, Chiba University in 1992.

In 1994, he left Chiba University for a division chair of a research division in the Department of Psychiatric Rehabilitation, National Institute of Mental Health.

In 1998, he completed a doctoral dissertation entitled, "Distribution of EE and Its Relationship to Relapse in Japan," and earned a doctorate in Psychiatry and Neurology from Chiba University. He was promoted to the director of the Department of Psychiatric Rehabilitation in 2000.

Ito is also a founding co-chair of the Board of Directors of Community Mental Health & Welfare Bonding Organization, an authorized NPO entity aiming to improve wellbeing of persons with mental disabilities.
