= Edogawadai =

Coordinates: 35.8971°N 139.9105°E

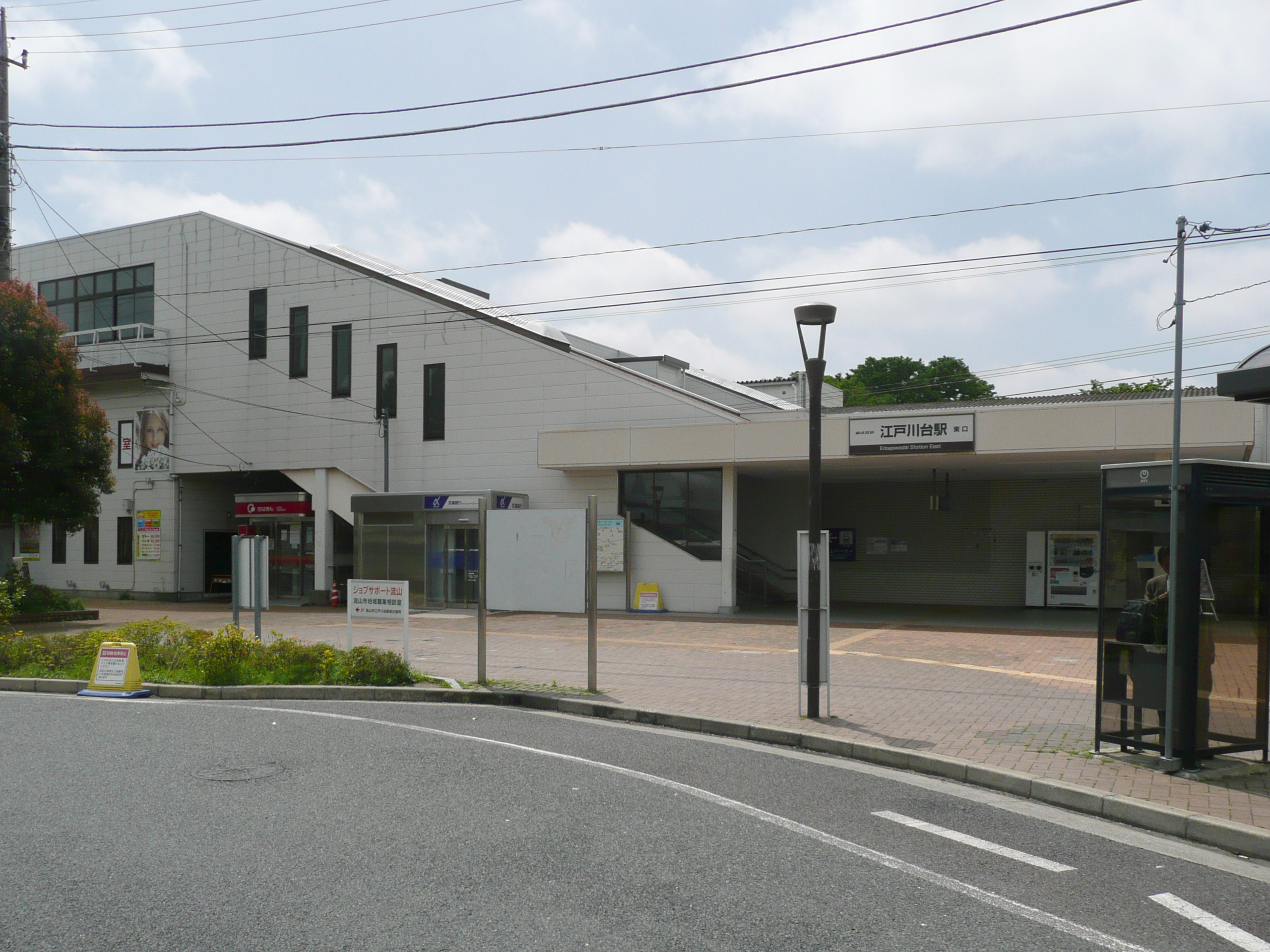
Edogawadai Station

Edogawadai (江戸川台) is a district of the city of Nagareyama, Chiba Prefecture, Japan. Edogawadai is about 10 minutes by train from Kashiwa via the Tōbu Noda Line from Edogawadai Station and commuters into Tokyo only have to change trains once, making the town convenient for Tokyo-based workers.

== Facilities ==
Since the opening of the University of Tokyo's Kashiwa campus and the related development of Kashiwanoha, the population of this area has grown. The university campus is an approximate 25-minute walk from the centre of Edogawadai. The station lies roughly in the centre of the town, with the railway delineating the boundary between edogawdaihigashi and edogawdainishi (east and west Edogawdai respectively) and several shops surround the station. A multitude of restaurants line the road between the station and the university campus.

== Transport ==
Edogawadai has a variety of transport links.

=== Trains ===
Edogawadai Station lies on the Tōbu Noda Line. This line provides regular links to Kashiwa and Nagareyama with both stations being about 25 minutes from Tokyo via the Jōban Line (for Ueno) and Tsukuba Express (for Akihabara) respectively.

Narita International Airport is about an hour away from Edogawadai by train with the traveller needing to change at Funabashi or Shin-Kamagaya.

In the northerly direction, there are trains just as frequently to Kasukabe and Ōmiya. The popular tourist destination of Nikkō (日光) is reachable within 2 hours.

=== Buses ===
There are regular bus links to Kashiwa, Nagareyama, the University of Tokyo and Kashiwanoha campus.
