= Chiba University =

Higher education institution in Chiba Prefecture, Japan

- 千葉大学
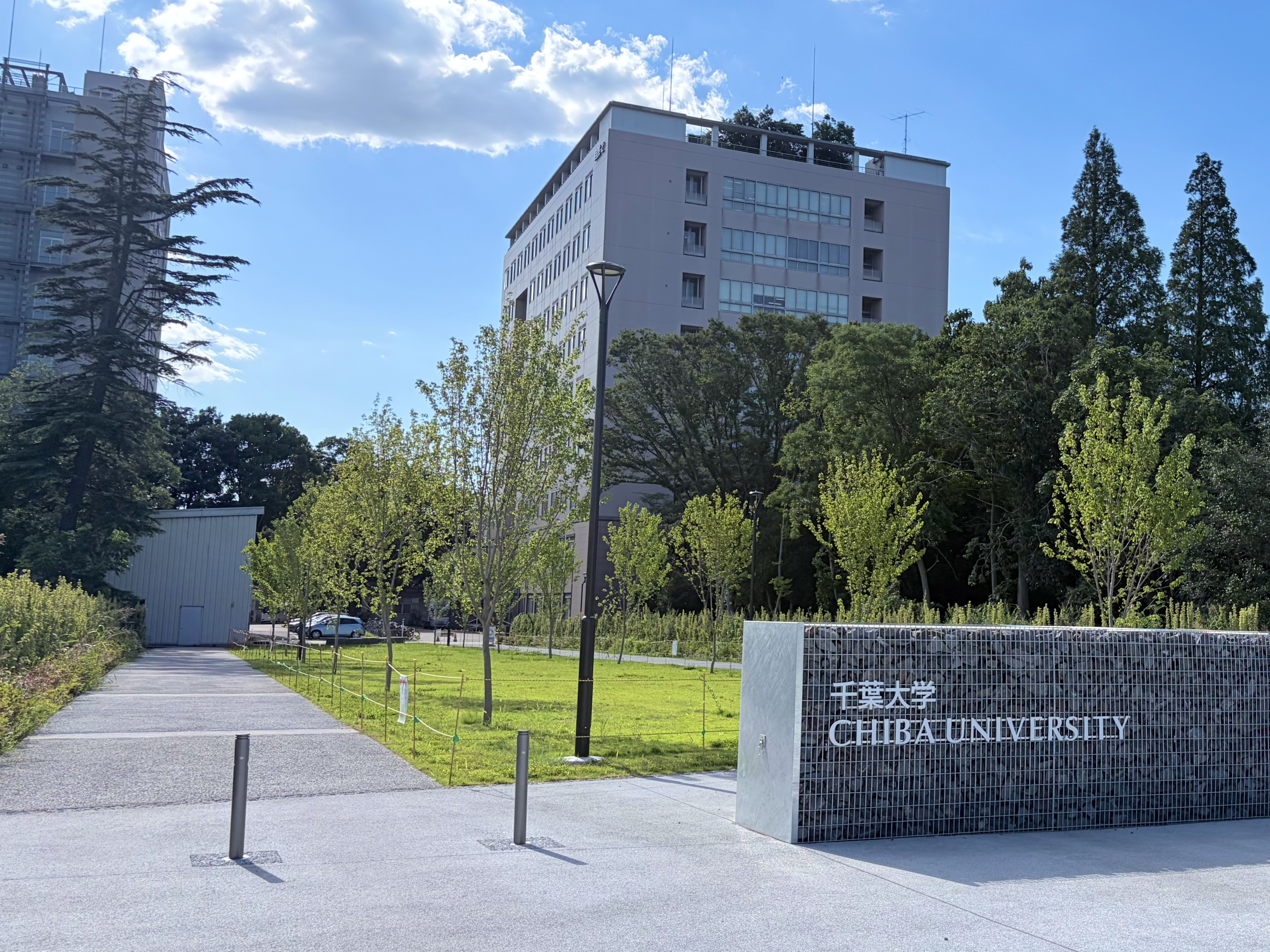
- Nishi-Chiba Campus
- Motto: Always Aim Higher
- Type: National
- Established: 1872 (chartered 1949)
- President: Kotaro Yokote
- Administrative staff: 2,572
- Undergraduates: 11,000
- Postgraduates: 3,528
- Location: Chiba, Chiba, Japan; 35°37′52″N 140°05′48″E
- Campus: Urban
- Website: chiba-u.jp/e/

- Location within Chiba Prefecture

Chiba University (千葉大学, Chiba Daigaku) is a national university located in Chiba Prefecture, a region noted for its industrial, intellectual and international achievements. It has campuses at Nishi-Chiba, Inohana, Matsudo, Kashiwanoha and Sumida. Its abbreviated name is Chibadai (千葉大).

Founded in 1872, it became a national university in 1949, and currently consists of nine faculties, the university library, the university hospital and other educational and research facilities. With 11,179 students in the undergraduate program, it has long been one of the largest universities in Japan. At the graduate level, there are about 2,354 students in ten master's programs and 1,220 in nine doctoral programs. It offers doctoral degrees in education as part of a coalition with Tokyo Gakugei University, Saitama University, and Yokohama National University.

Chiba University has been ranked 168th on the Asia University Rankings 2019 Top 100 by "The Times Higher Education" and has achieved a high degree of participation in international cooperative research projects. Chiba University presently has a large body of international research scholars and students studying on its various campuses. As of 2009, there are approximately 477 international researchers and 957 international students.

== History ==
The university was formed in 1949 from existing educational institutions in Chiba Prefecture, and over a period of years absorbed Chiba Medical University (1923–1960), a preparatory department of the Tokyo Medical and Dental University, Chiba Normal School (1872–1951), Chiba Higher College of Horticulture (1909–1949), Tokyo Polytechnic High School (1914–1951), among others. Chiba University was reincorporated in 2010 under the National University Corporation Act.

== Campuses ==
Chiba University has four campuses in Chiba Prefecture and one in neighbouring Tokyo.

- Nishi-Chiba (accessed from Nishi-Chiba Station or Midoridai Station)
- Inohana (accessed from Hon-Chiba Station)
- Matsudo (accessed from Matsudo Station)
- Kashiwanoha (accessed from Kashiwanoha-campus Station)
- Sumida, Tokyo (accessed from Oshiage Station or Higashi-Azuma Station)

== Faculties and graduate schools ==
University rankings
Global
THE	General	801–1000
QS	General	791-800
ARWU	Research	601–700

Regional
QS Asia (Asia version)	General	175

National

=== Faculties ===
==== Liberal Arts and Sciences ====
The College of Liberal Arts and Sciences (CLAS) was established in 2016 as the 10th faculty of Chiba University. Its principal mission is to contribute to solving complex global issues for which no single field of study can provide adequate answers. Another task is to help shape our global society.

==== Letters ====
The Faculty of Letters offers courses in the fields of national and international languages, literature, history, psychology, anthropology, and in the relatively new fields of cross-cultural studies, information science and theoretical linguistics.

==== Education ====
The Faculty of Education dates back to the year 1872, the year of the establishment of the modern educational system in Japan, and has the longest history in this university.

==== Law, Politics and Economics ====
The Faculty of Law, Politics and Economics is unique among Chiba University faculties in that it conducts research and education in social sciences. The Faculty consists of four Majors: Major in Law, Economics, Management and Accounting, Politics and Policy Studies. Students enrolled in one Major will take courses offered in other majors to develop comprehensive and interdisciplinary understandings of various social phenomena at hand.

==== Science ====
The Faculty of Science comprises five departments and in active in both education and research. It offers a diversity of programs ranging from introductory courses for absolute beginners, via multi-disciplinary subjects, to pioneering sciences and their applications for more advanced learners. The Faculty helps students become all-round scientists, experts and/or assets to the industry and communities.

==== Engineering ====
The Faculty of Engineering consists of ten departments: Departments of Architecture, Urban Environment Systems, Design, Mechanical Engineering, Medical System Engineering, Electrical and Electronic Engineering, Nanoscience, Applied Chemistry and Biotechnology, Image Science, and Informatics and Imaging Systems. Most of the academic staff in the Faculty are also fully responsible for research and education within the two-year Master's and the three-year Doctoral Programs in the Graduate School of Engineering.

==== Informatics ====
The Faculty of Informatics was established in April 2024 as the 11th faculty of Chiba University. Data science and information engineering are regarded as practical studies that aim to solve problems and create industries based on various social data.

==== Medicine ====
The history of Chiba University School of Medicine can be traced back as early as 1874, when its predecessor was founded as a private hospital by donations from the local community. In 1876 it became a prefectural institution with medical teaching facilities and was named the Chiba Public Hospital. In 1923 it became the Chiba Medical College, and was incorporated into the School of Medicine at Chiba University in 1949. Alumni from this school have contributed greatly to the progress of medicine in Japan.

==== Pharmaceutical Sciences ====
The Faculty of Pharmaceutical Sciences was founded as the Department of Pharmacy in the Medical School of the First Senior High School in 1890, and is the oldest pharmaceutical faculty among Japanese national universities. Since then, the Faculty has greatly contributed to the development of pharmaceutical sciences in Japan through education and research works. The Faculty consists of two departments: Department of Pharmacy (a six-year education program) and Department of Pharmaceutical Sciences (a four-year education program). The graduates from the Department of Pharmacy are qualified to take the national examination for the pharmacist's license.

==== Nursing ====
The School of Nursing offers a program leading to the Bachelor of Science in Nursing. The School also offers an RN-BSN option for registered nurses with an associate degree or diploma in nursing. Upon successful completion of the required courses, graduates are qualified to take the national licensure examinations for nurses, public health nurses, and/or midwives.

==== Horticulture ====
Graduate School of Horticulture, located on top of a scenic hill in Matsudo City, has had major academic and international contributions in horticulture and landscape science since it was founded in 1909. It is the only faculty or graduate school known by the name of horticulture among Japanese universities.

The Graduate School of Horticulture offers education and research encompassing all aspects of "Horticulture, Food and Landscape" with interdisciplinary and international perspectives. With this aim, The Graduate School of Horticulture's teaching and research programs consists not only of natural sciences but also of social sciences and humanities, such as: cultivation, plant breeding, biotechnology of bio-resources, landscape design and engineering, human health and welfare, environmental science for sustainable cities and nature conservation, food system studies, and environmental and development economics.

The research fields of the Graduate School of Horticulture are as follows:

Bioresource Science:

- Horticultural Plant Production and Breeding
- Environmental Science for Bioproduction
- Applied Biological Chemistry

Environmental Science and Landscape Architecture:

- Landscape Architecture
- Landscape Science
- Environment and Human Health Sciences

Food and Resource Economics

- Food System Analysis
- Resource and Environmental Economics

=== Graduate schools ===
- Humanities and Studies on Public Affairs
- Law School
- Education
- Science and Engineering
- Informatics
- Horticulture
- Medical and Pharmaceutical Sciences
- Nursing
- Global and Transdisciplinary Studies

== Notable alumni ==
- Ai Aoki, politician (Education)
- Nobuyoshi Araki, photographer (Technology of Photograph and Printing, 1963)
- Masanobu Endō, video game designer (Engineering)
- Katsuichi Honda, journalist (Pharmaceutical Sciences)
- Junichiro Ito, director of the Department of Psychiatric Rehabilitation, National Institute of Mental Health
- Tomisaku Kawasaki, pediatrician, Kawasaki disease named after him
- Taku Kishimoto, anime screenwriter
- Naoshi Mizuta, video game composer (Law & Economics)
- Kayoko Okubo, comedian (Letters)
- Norihisa Tamura, politician (Minister of Health, Labor and Welfare)
- Takashi Yanase, cartoonist (Engineering)
