= Inage Senior High School =

Senior High School located in Chiba City, Japan

Coordinates: 35°37′13.55″N 140°04′06.71″E

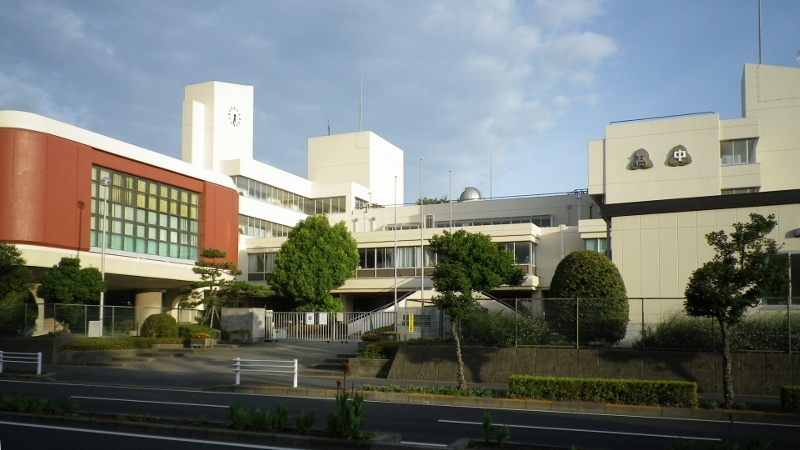
Inage Senior High School

Chiba Municipal Inage Senior High School (千葉市立稲毛高等学校, Chiba-shiritsu Inage Kōtōgakkō) is a senior high school located in Mihama-ku, Chiba City, Chiba Prefecture, Japan. It is one of two municipally-controlled high schools in Chiba City. It has an affiliated junior high school (稲毛高附属中学校).

The school opened in 1979. The intercultural course started in 1990. The school's affiliated junior high school opened in 2007, making it the first public high school in Chiba City to have an affiliated junior high school.

Its sister school in the United States is Lamar High School in Houston, Texas. Houston has been Chiba's sister city through Sister Cities International since 1973.

== See also ==
- List of junior high schools in Chiba Prefecture
