= List of junior high schools in Saitama Prefecture =

This is a list of junior high schools in Saitama Prefecture.

== National ==
- Junior High School Attached to Saitama University

== Municipal ==
=== Saitama City ===
Chūō-ku

- Hachioji (八王子中学校)
- Yono Higashi (与野東中学校)
- Yono Minami (与野南中学校)
- Yono Nishi (与野西中学校)

Iwatsuki-ku

- Hakuyo (柏陽中学校)
- Iwatsuki (岩槻中学校)
- Jionji (慈恩寺中学校)
- Johoku (城北中学校)
- Jonan (城南中学校)
- Kawadoori (川通中学校)
- Nishihara (西原中学校)
- Sakurayama (桜山中学校)

Kita-ku

- Miyahara (宮原中学校)
- Nisshin (日進中学校)
- Taihei (泰平中学校)
- Toro (土呂中学校)
- Uetake (植竹中学校)

Midori-ku

- Harayama (原山中学校)
- Higashi Urawa (東浦和中学校)
- Mimuro (三室中学校)
- Misono (美園中学校)
- Misono Minami (美園南中学校)
- Omagi (尾間木中学校)

Minami-ku

- Kishi (岸中学校)
- Minami Urawa (南浦和中学校)
- Oyaba (大谷場中学校)
- Oyaguchi (大谷口中学校)
- Shirahata (白幡中学校)
- Uchiya (内谷中学校)

Minuma-ku

- Haruno (春野中学校)
- Harusato (春里中学校)
- Katayanagi (片柳中学校)
- Nanasato (七里中学校)
- Omiya Yahata (大宮八幡中学校)
- Osato (大砂土中学校)
- Oya (大谷中学校)

Nishi-ku

- Mamiya (馬宮中学校)
- Miyamae (宮前中学校)
- Omiya Nishi (大宮西中学校)
- Sashiogi (指扇中学校)
- Tsuchiya (土屋中学校)
- Uemizu (植水中学校)

Omiya-ku

- No. 2 (Daini) Higashi (第二東中学校)
- Mihashi (三橋中学校)
- Omiya Higashi (大宮東中学校)
- Omiya Kita (大宮北中学校)
- Omiya Minami (大宮南中学校)
- Onari (大成中学校)
- Sakuragi (桜木中学校)

Sakura-ku

- Kami Okubo (上大久保中学校)
- Okubo (大久保中学校)
- Tajima (田島中学校)
- Tsuchiai (土合中学校)

Urawa-ku

- Kizaki (木崎中学校)
- Motobuto (本太中学校)
- Ohara (大原中学校)
- Tokiwa (常盤中学校)
- Urawa Junior and Senior High School (浦和中学校・高等学校)

== Private ==
- Rikkyo Niiza Junior and Senior High School (Rikkyo Niiza Junior and Senior High School, ja:立教新座中学校・高等学校)
- Saitama Korean Elementary and Middle School (埼玉朝鮮初中級学校). This school was previously in the City of Ōmiya.

== See also ==
- List of elementary schools in Saitama Prefecture
