= List of special education schools in Tokyo =

This is a list of special education schools in Tokyo Metropolis, including the 23 special wards and West Tokyo. (No such schools are in the Islands of Tokyo).

== Metropolitan schools ==
=== Blind ===
- Bunkyo - Bunkyo
- Hachioji - Hachioji
- Katsushika - Katsushika
- Kugayama Seiko Gakuen - Also for students with intellectual disability - Setagaya

=== Deaf ===
- Chuo - Suginami
- Otsuka - Consists of a main campus (Toshima), Eifuku Branch (Suginami), Jonan Branch (Ota), and Joto Branch (Koto)
- Katsushika - Katsushika
- Tachikawa - Tachikawa

=== Intellectual disability ===
- Adachi - Adachi
- Akiruno Gakuen - Also for students who also have physical disabilities - Akiruno
- Aoyama - Minato
- Chofu - Chofu
- Den-enchofu - Ota
- Eifuku Gakuen - Also for students who also have physical disabilities - Suginami
- Fuchu Keyakinomori Gakuen - Also for students with physical disabilities - Fuchu
- Hachioji - Hachioji
- Hachioji Nishi - Hachioji
- Hamura - Hamura
- Hanahata Gakuen - Also for students who also have physical disabilities - Adachi
- Higashikurume - Higashikurume
- Itabashi - Itabashi
- Joto - Koto
- Katsushika - Katsushika
- Kiyose - Kiyose
- Koganei - Koganei
- Koto - Koto
- Kugayama Seiko Gakuen - Also for students with vision impairment - Setagaya
- Machida-no-oka Gakuen - Two branches in Machida: The main branch is for students who are intellectually disabled and physically disabled, while the Yamazaki Branch is a general school for students who are intellectually disabled
- Minami-Hanahata - Adachi
- Minami-Osawa Gakuen - Hachioji
- Minato - Minato
- Mizumoto - Katsushika
- Mizumoto Koai Gakuen - Also for people with physical disabilities - Katsushika
- Musashidai Gakuen - Also for students with health issues - Fuchu
- Nakano - Nakano
- Nanao - Hino
- Nerima - Nerima
- Oji - Kita
- Rinkai Aomi - Koto
- Seicho - Setagaya
- Seiho Gakuen - Also for people with physical disabilities - Ome
- Shakujii - Nerima
- Shiinoki - Located in Ichihara, Chiba
- Shikamoto Gakuen - Also for people with physical disabilities - Edogawa
- Shimura Gakuen - Also for people with physical disabilities - Itabashi
- Shinagawa - Shinagawa
- Shirasagi - Edogawa
- Sumida - Sumida
- Takashima - Itabashi
- Tama Sakura-no-oka Gakuen - Also for people with physical disabilities - Tama
- Tachikawa Gakuen - Also for students with difficulties in hearing - Tachikawa
- Tanashi - Nishitokyo
- Yaguchi - Ota

=== Health difficulties ===
For students with health difficulties:

- Bokuto - Also for students with physical disabilities - Koto
- Kita - Also for students with physical disabilities - Kita
- Kodaira - Also for students with physical disabilities - Kodaira
- Komei Gakuen - Also for students with health issues - Setagaya
- Musashidai Gakuen Fuchu Branch - Also for students with intellectual disability - Tokyo Metropolitan Children's Medical Center, Fuchu

=== Physical disability ===
- Akiruno Gakuen - Also for people with intellectual disability - Akiruno
- Bokuto - Also for people with health issues - Koto
- Eifuku Gakuen - Also for people with intellectual disability - Suginami
- Fuchu Keyakinomori Gakuen - Also for people with intellectual disability - Fuchu
- Hachioji Higashi - Hachioji
- Hanahata Gakuen - Also for people with intellectual disability - Adachi
- Johoku - Adachi
- Jonan - Ota
- Kita - Also for people with health issues - Kita
- Kodaira - Also for people with health issues - Kodaira
- Komei Gakuen - Also for people with health issues - Setagaya
- Machida-no-oka Gakuen - Also for people with intellectual disability - Machida
- Mizumoto Koai Gakuen - Also for people with intellectual disability - Katsushika
- Murayama - Musashimurayama
- Oizumi - Nerima
- Seiho Gakuen - Also for people with intellectual disability - Ome
- Shikamoto Gakuen - Also for people with intellectual disability - Edogawa
- Shimura Gakuen - Also for people with intellectual disability - Itabashi
- Tama Sakura-no-oka Gakuen - Also for people with intellectual disability - Tama

== Municipal schools ==
Shinjuku City

- Shinjuku School for the Handicapped (新宿区立新宿養護学校)

Note that Hota Shiosai Elementary School (保田しおさい学校) is physically located in Kyonan, Awa District, Chiba Prefecture, but it is a municipally-operated school by Katsushika City.

== Private schools ==
- Meisei Gakuen - It uses Japanese sign language.
