= Kashiwanoha =

Kashiwanoha 柏の葉
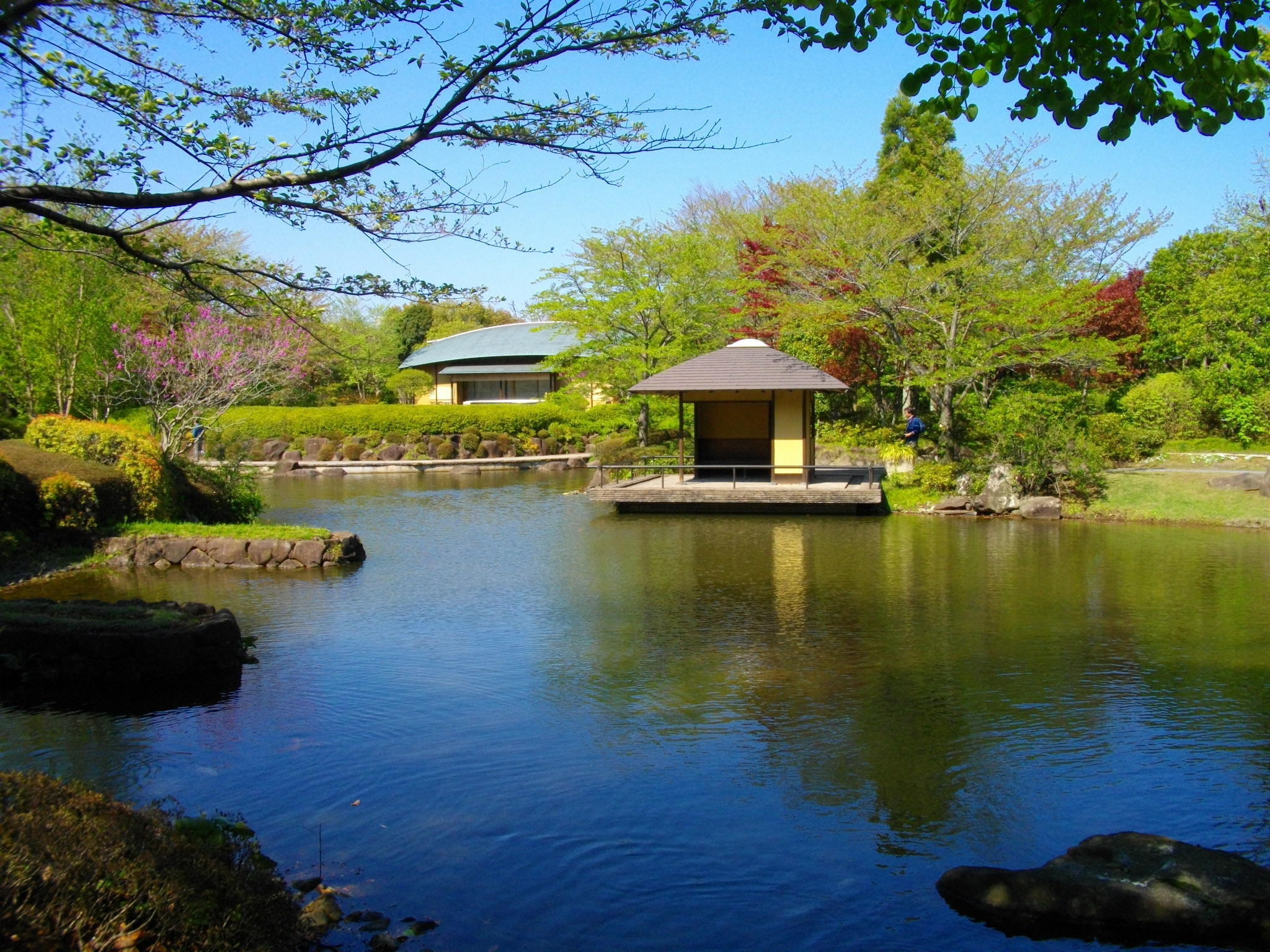
- Kashiwanoha Park Makigahara-en

- Location within Japan
- Coordinates: 35°42′2″N 139°42′54″E
- Country: Japan
- Region: Kantō
- Prefecture: Chiba Prefecture
- Core city: Kashiwa

Population (As of October 31, 2018)
  - Total: 4,124
- Time zone: UTC+9 (Japan Standard Time)
- Postal code: 277-0882
- Area code: 04
- Website: city.kashiwa.lg.jp (in Japanese)

Kashiwanoha (柏の葉; "Oak Leaf") is an area of Kashiwa in the Chiba Prefecture of Japan, less than 25 minutes by Tsukuba Express, Tokyo's fastest private railway, from Akihabara (秋葉原), Tokyo.

With the opening of the University of Tokyo, Kashiwa Campus, the population of Kashiwanoha is growing, and the area is undergoing corresponding development, including the recent opening of a baseball stadium and football pitch in Kashiwanoha Park.

== Geography ==
The area was developed as part of the Kashiwa Communications Center Land Readjustment Project. The area is home to many national and prefectural facilities, including Kashiwanoha Park, the University of Tokyo and Chiba University. It is adjacent to Naka-Juyoji, Juyoji, Shin-Juyoji, Wakashiba and Shorenji in Kashiwa City and Komagidai in Nagareyama City. The area is also home to the Chiba Prefectural Kashiwanoha Park (Kashiwanoha Park Stadium and Sawayaka Chiba Kenmin Plaza), the Jyuyoji Elementary School, and the University of Tokyo's Kashiwanoha Elementary School. The area between Kashiwa-no-ha Campus Station and Kashiwa-no-ha Park is currently lined with double-flowered cherry trees, planted by the Yae-Zakura Tree Development Council, which is made up of citizens, Chiba Prefecture, Kashiwa City, local businesses and Chiba University.

- Kashiwanoha Park

Kashiwanoha Park covers an area of approximately 3 square kilometers. Complete with a lake, children's playground and running tracks, this is a very popular attraction. Many people visit to row on the lake and use the barbecue facilities, or just to view the surrounding gardens.

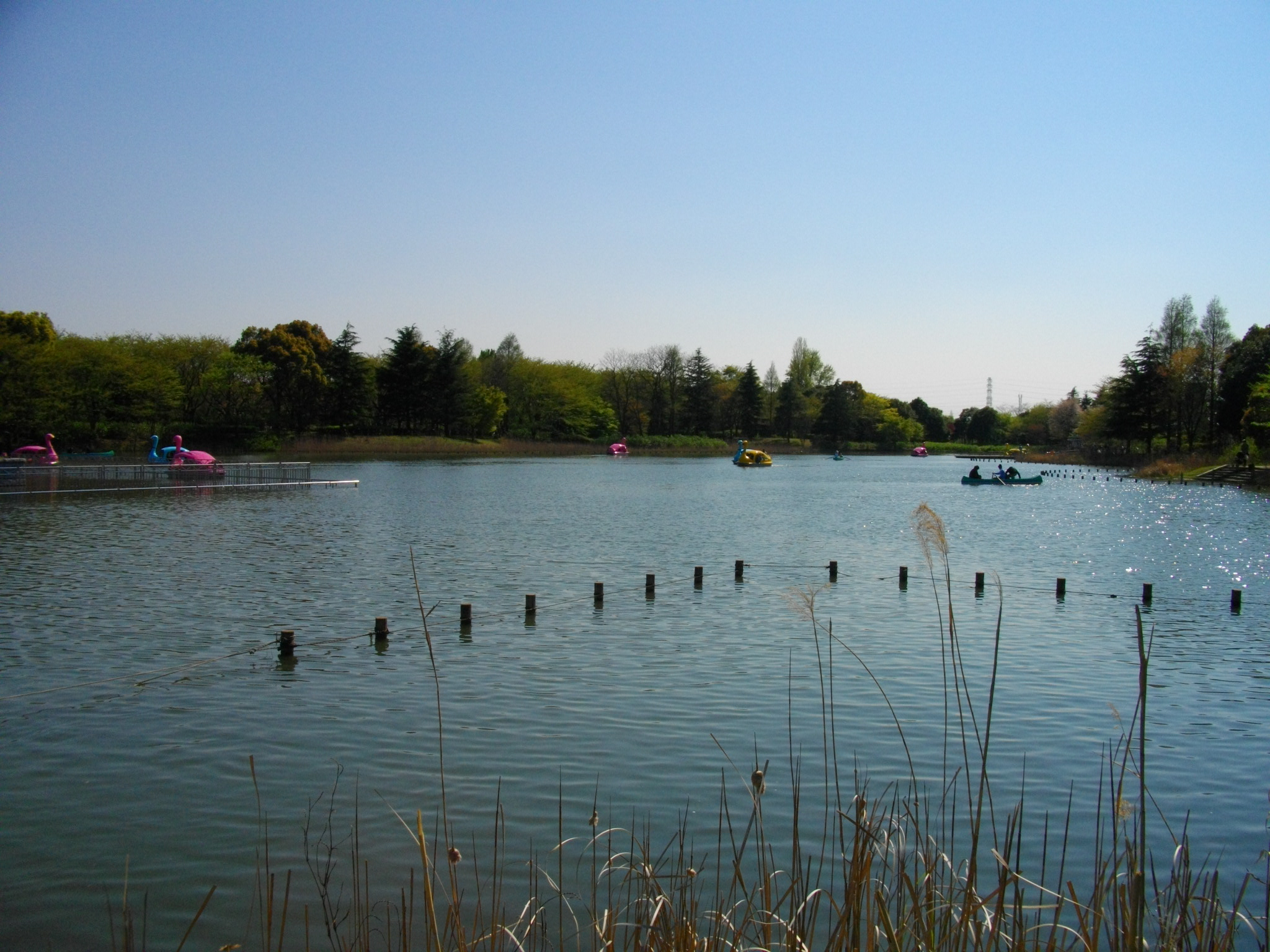
Kashiwanoha Park Boat Pond

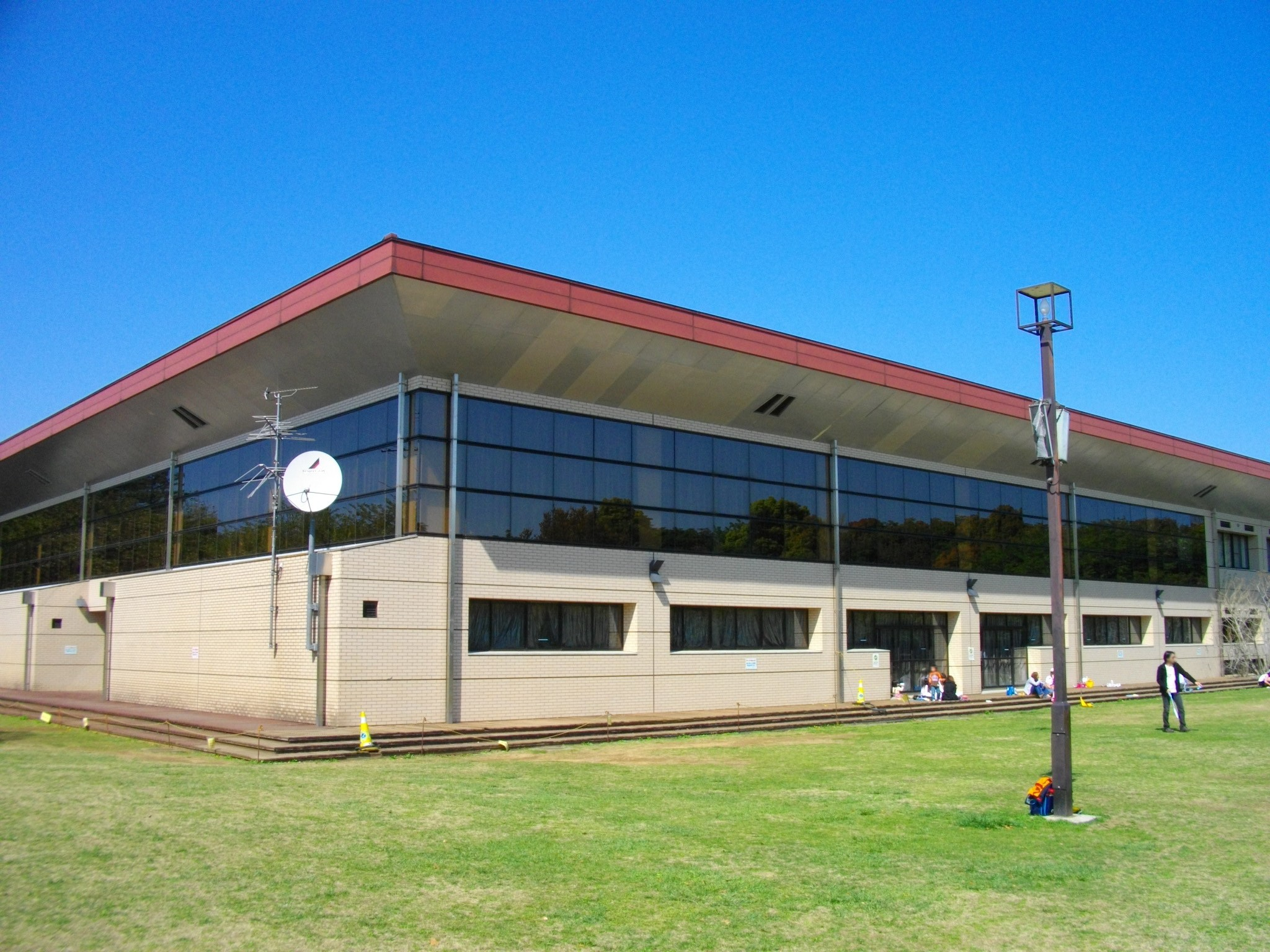
Kashiwanoha Park Community Gymnasium

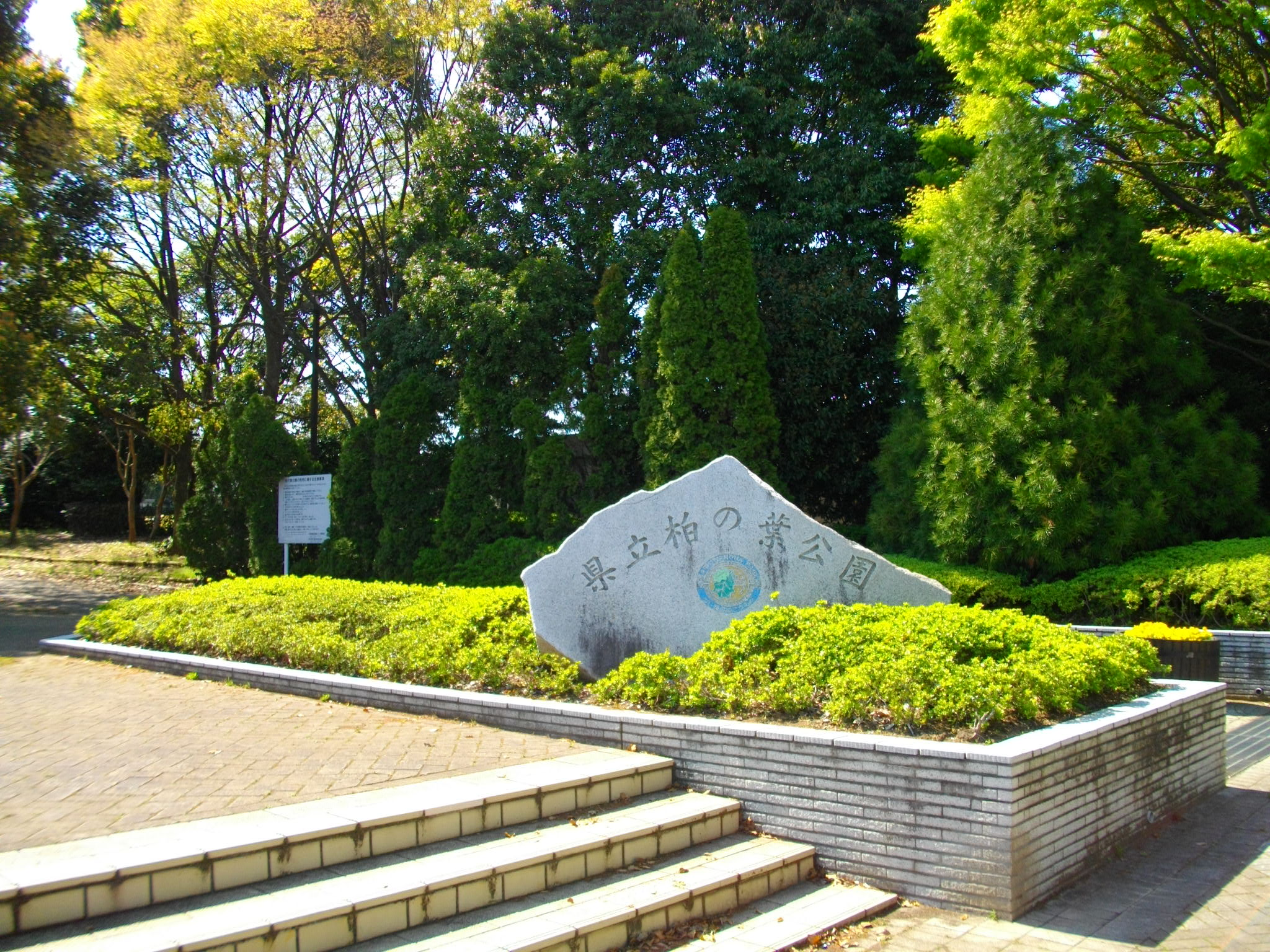
Kashiwanoha Park Entrance

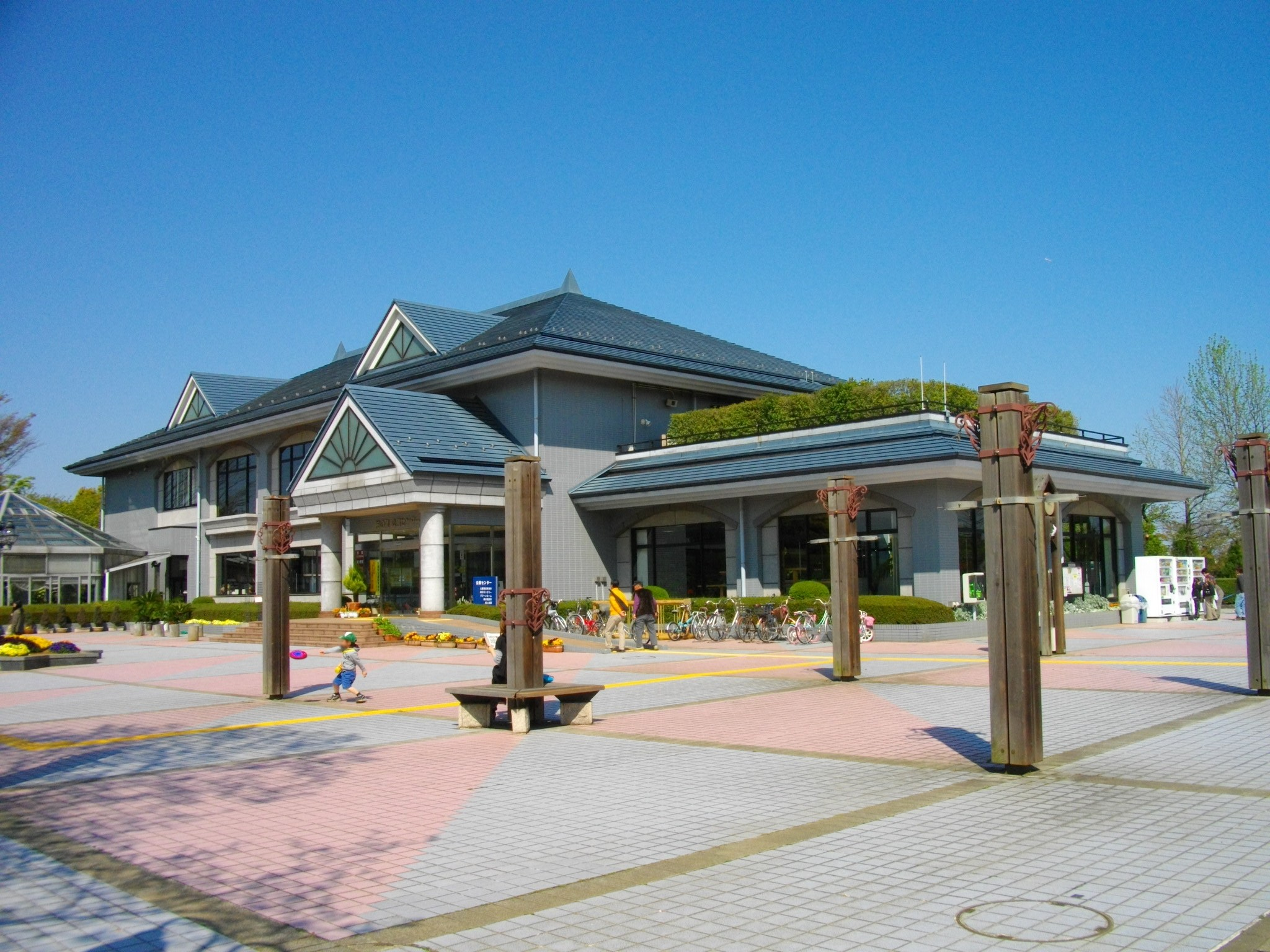
Kashiwanoha Park Koen Center

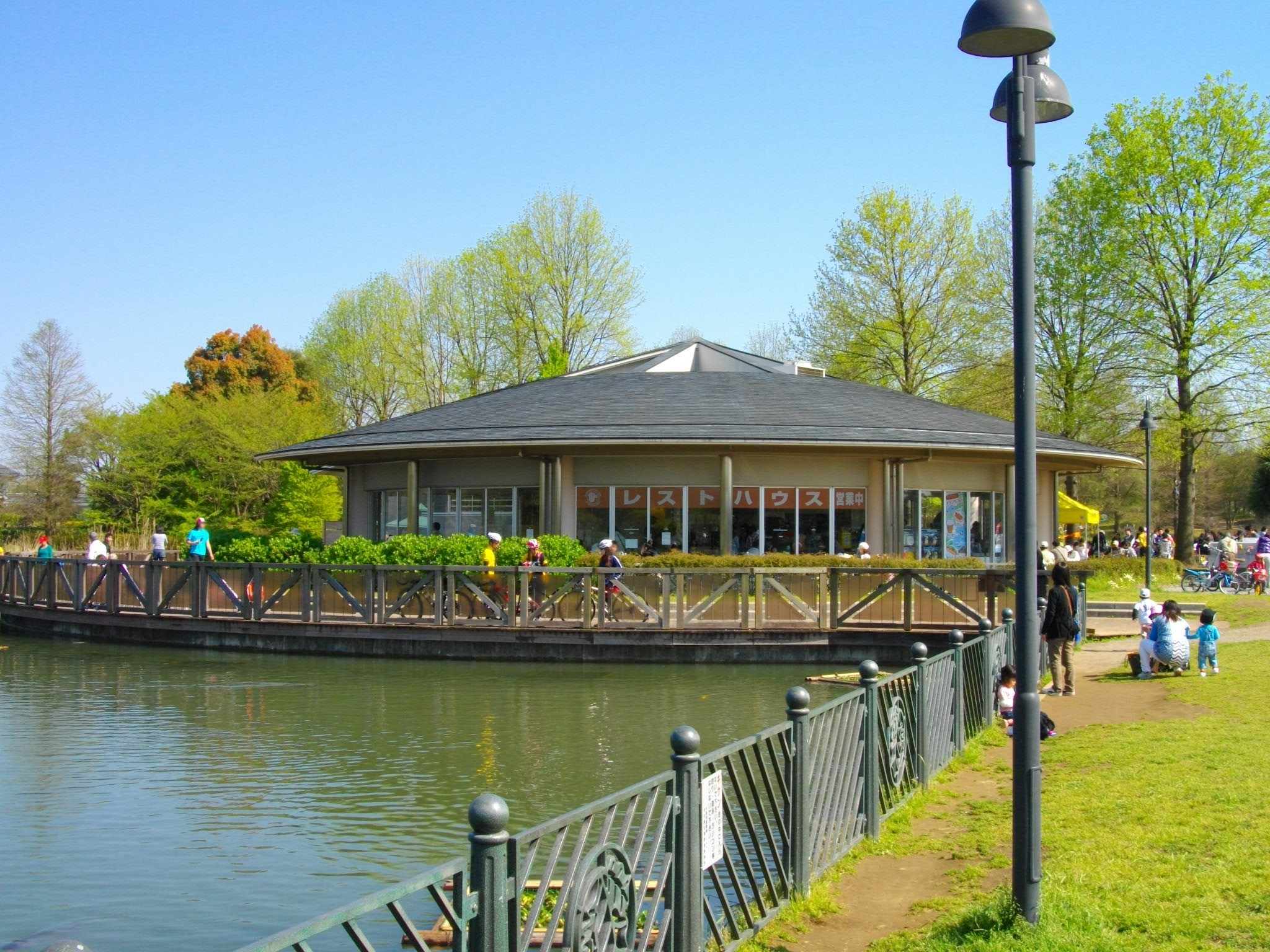
Kashiwanoha Park Rest House
- Kashiwanoha Park Stadium

Composed of a baseball stadium and a football pitch.

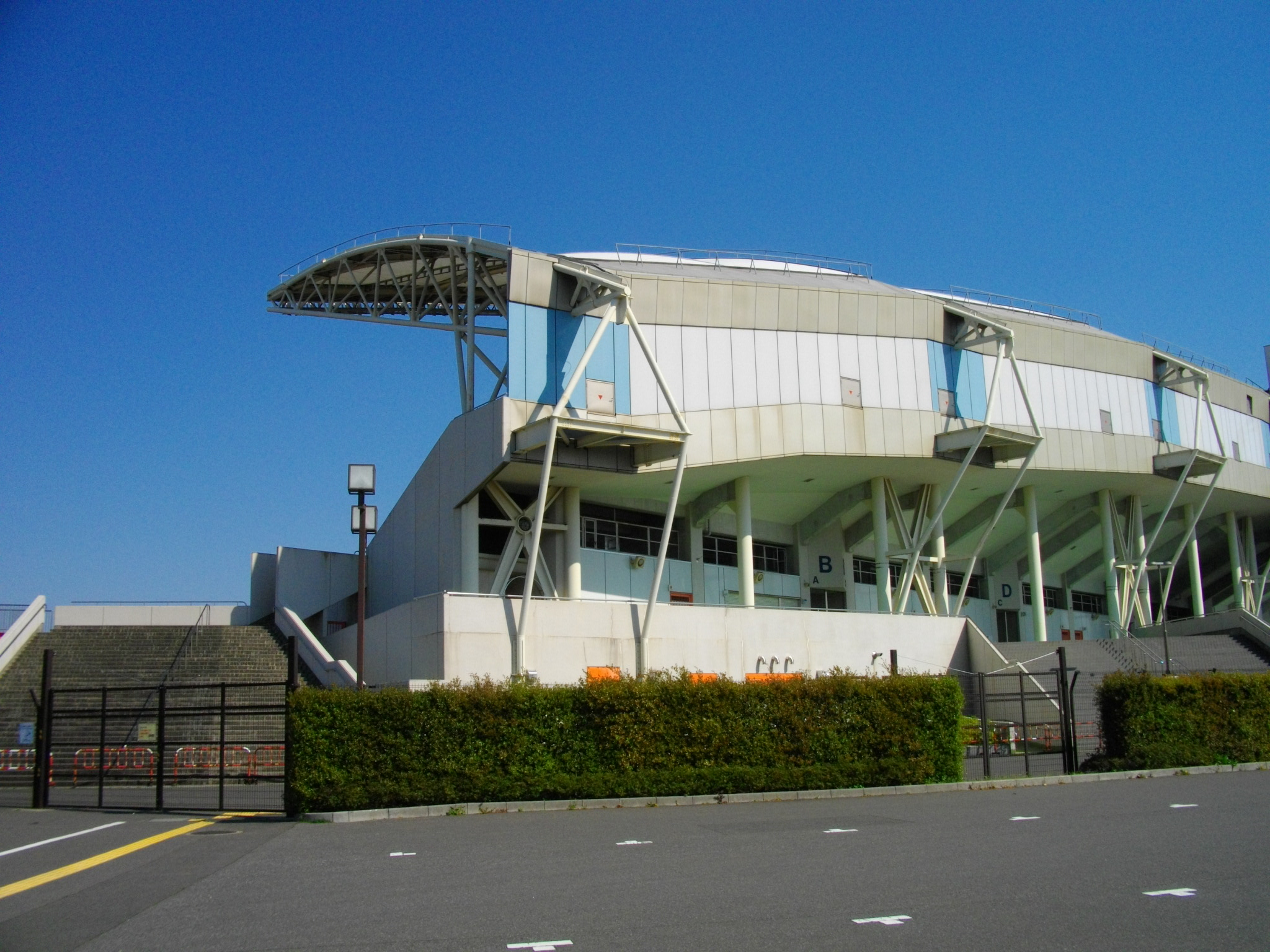
Kashiwanoha Park Stadium
- Kashiwanoha Campus

Kashiwanoha-campus Station is number 13 on the Tsukuba Express line (as numbered with Akihabara being station number 1). The Lalaport centre is immediately adjacent to the station and incorporates a shopping centre, restaurant complex, cinema and gym. The campus centre has bus links to Kashiwa, Nagareyama, Kashiwanoha Park, the University of Tokyo Kashiwa Campus and Edogawadai (for Edogawadai Station).

- University of Tokyo, Kashiwa Campus I

Newly built, state-of-the-art facilities.

- University of Tokyo, Kashiwa Campus II
- University of Tokyo, Kashiwa International Lodge
- Chiba University, Kashiwa campus
- UDCK
- Ministry of Finance, Customs Training Institute
- Police National, Research Institute of Police Science
- National Cancer Center
- Kashiwa Nishi Driving Schools

== Land prices ==
The land price for residential land is 169,000 yen/m^{2} at 1-6-14 Kashiwanoha, according to the public land price on 1 January 2017.

== Major events ==
- Kashiwa Festival

Every year on the third Saturday in August, the residents of the area hold the Kashiwa-no-ha Festival on the "Fureai-no-michi" path through the Kashiwa-no-ha Park residential area.

== History ==
The area around present-day Kashiwa-no-ha was used for grazing horses until the Edo period (1603-1868). After the Meiji period (1868-1912), the land was reclaimed as part of the relief efforts for Tokyo's distressed population following the Meiji Restoration (1868-1912), and turned into farmland with a focus on field crops.

As a result of a plan to attract military facilities to the Kashiwa area as part of a regional development plan, the Army and Kashiwa Airfield (105th Eastern Division), which had a 1,500-meter runway and an area of over 500,000 tsubo, were built in 1938. By the end of the war, when air raids intensified, the airfield was used as a base for five squadrons. At the end of the war, the airfield was used together with Fujigaya Airfield (now Shimofusa Air Base, Maritime Self-Defense Force) and Matsudo Airfield (now Matsudo Garrison, Ground Self-Defense Force) as a base for intercepting B-29s. It also used for the development and testing of the prototype rocket plane "Shisui".

It was occupied by the U.S. military from October 1945 until the end of the same year. To alleviate food shortages, repatriates, former military personnel, and former small farmers from the surrounding area settled in the zone and began cultivating the land. But with the outbreak of the Korean War, the U.S. military seized the land again to use it as a communications facility. There was strong oppositions, but negotiations were finally concluded with the US Army to set conditions for the use of the land, and in 1954 the Kashiwa Radio Transmitting Station (later the Kashiwa Communications Station) was built.

Later, when the conditions of use were changed and the land was acquired for private use, many pioneer farmers and residents left the area, except for a few. On 30 September 1977, a large area of land divided into north and south sections was returned, except for the central part of the Kashiwa Communication Station. The remaining land was transferred to the jurisdiction of the U.S. Coast Guard Far East Division, and plans were announced for the construction of Loran C Station, a facility for the directional support of ships and other vessels. On the other hand, due to the technical and financial difficulties of implementing measures to prevent radio interference to the surrounding area, the US military suspended the construction of Loran C station, which was returned to Japan on August 14, 1979.

In June 1975, the Director-General of the Defense Facilities Agency told the Cabinet Committee of the House of Representatives that he would "negotiate with the U.S. Army about the return of the Kashiwa Tracking Station (once the land use plan is finalised)". In December 1979, based on a draft of the site use plan prepared by Kashiwa City, a plan for the layout of facilities using the entire area of the site (188 hectares) was presented to the Ministry of Finance. It was agreed that the Ministry of Finance would reduce the area for local use, including welfare facilities and public cemeteries, from the original plan of 60 hectares to 45 hectares, and increase the amount of land for national government facilities to create a reserved area.

In addition, in January 1982, an offer was made by the government to introduce public housing within the national reserved land. Although the basic policy for the use of the former site was "in principle, a facility that does not involve the establishment of a population" in order to emphasise the public interest, the public housing was accepted with the objective of reducing the financial burden on the local community by adding the primary school site for local use and by providing urban infrastructure facilities under the Public Corporation's "Replacement System for Related Public Facilities". It was decided to accept the project.

As a result, the site became increasingly desolate, with illegal dumping of construction waste. On 18 August 1982, a murder and body dumping incident occurred. In November of the same year, the Central Council for National Property issued a report entitled "Disposal of the National Land Returned from the Kashiwa Communications Center".

From March 30 of the same year to November 1990, the entire area of Oaza Naka-Juyoji-Aza-Motoyama and part of Oaza Juyoji-Aza-Minamiyama in Kashiwa City (part of which was incorporated into Kashiwa City from Oaza-Komagi-Shinden-Aza-Minamidaichu-Aza-Minamitaito in Nagareyama City on November 1, 1969, and became Oaza-Komagi-Shinden-Aza-Minamidaichu-Aza-Minamitaito in Kashiwa City) were transferred to Kashiwa City. The area was renamed Kashiwa-no-ha 1-chome to 6-chome on March 24, 1970, four months after the project was completed. Kashiwa City's urban areas are mostly residential areas, but Kashiwa-no-ha 1-chome to 6-chome have been renamed. Afterwards, the Tsukuba Express train service continued to pass through the neighbouring Wakashiba, and the Kashiwanoha Campus station opened in Wakashiba at the same time as the Tsukuba Express service began on 24 August 2005. Today, the name Kashiwa-no-ha is used not only to refer to Kashiwa-no-ha 1-chome to 6-chome, but also to the area around Kashiwa-no-ha Campus Station in a broader sense, and the Kashiwa-no-ha International Campus Town is being constructed in the adjacent Wakashiba, Juyoji, Naka Juyoji, and Shorenji areas in the Kashiwa North Central District. In the area, the construction of Kashiwanoha International Campus Town is underway. August 25, 2005: Tsukuba Express, Tokyo's fastest private railway, opens in Akihabara.

== Origin of the name ==
The name "Kashiwanoha Park" is derived from the name of Chiba Prefectural Kashiwanoha Park, which was developed earlier in the year. The park was named by Hirotaka Saito, head teacher of Tanaka-kita elementary school in Kashiwa city in 1985, after the oak tree that survived the harsh winter and kept its previous leaves intact until new buds appeared.

== Smart City ==
The Kashiwanoha smart city project (first described as Kashiwanoha International Campus Town Initiative) is a planned from scratch city project, involving a greenfield smart city vision, situated around Kashiwanoha Campus Station. Kashiwonoha smart city project is a privately led project, with Mitsui Fudosan as the main developer. It was also the owner the previous owner of the golf course on which construction work of the project were first based. However, Kashiwa city was designated as one of the "FutureCities" by the national government in 2011, making Kashiwanoha new town project eligible for government subsidies.

The project pursues the declared objectives of an "eco-friendly urban development", "longer healthy life expectancy" and the "creation of new industries". Within these ambition frameworks, it involved the development by Hitachi of an Area Energy Management System in order to manage energy supply in four zones around the station. The smart city vision of the project was impacted by the 2011 Tohoku earthquake and the power footage which hit the city at this occasion. Thus, the creation of a business continuity energy plan within the project, to protect the town and its activity of future similar events. It induced the installation of a gas-fired power generator and storage batteries, providing energy interchange between the different zones.
