= List of municipal schools in Shinjuku =

This is a list of municipal schools in Shinjuku, a special ward of Tokyo, Japan.

Public elementary and junior high schools in Shinjuku are operated by the Shinjuku City (the Shinjuku Ward) Board of Education.

== Junior high schools ==
Junior high schools:

- Nishishinjuku Junior High School (西新宿中学校)
- Nishitoyama Junior High School (新宿西戸山中学校)
- Nishiwaseda Junior High School (西早稲田中学校)
- Ochiai Junior High School (落合中学校)
- Ochiai No. 2 Junior High School (落合第二中学校)
- Shinjuku Junior High School (新宿中学校)
- Ushigome No. 1 Junior High School (牛込第一中学校)
- Ushigome No. 2 Junior High School (牛込第二中学校)
- Ushigome No. 3 Junior High School (牛込第三中学校)
- Yotsuya Junior High School (四谷中学校)

== Elementary schools ==
Elementary schools:

- Aijitsu Elementary School (愛日小学校)
- Edogawa Elementary School (江戸川小学校)
- Hanazono Elementary School (花園小学校)
- Higashitoyama Elementary School (東戸山小学校)
- Ichigaya Elementary School (市谷小学校)
- Kashiwagi Elementary School (柏木小学校)
- Nishi-Shinjuku Elementary School (西新宿小学校)
- Nishi-Toyama Elementary School (西戸山小学校)
- Ochiai Daiichi (No. 1) Elementary School (落合第一小学校)
- Ochiai Daini (No. 2) Elementary School (落合第二小学校)
- Ochiai Daisan (No. 3) Elementary School (落合第三小学校)
- Ochiai Daiyon (No. 4) Elementary School (落合第四小学校)
- Ochiai Daigo (No. 5) Elementary School (落合第五小学校)
- Ochiai Dairoku (No. 6) Elementary School (落合第六小学校)
- Ōkubo Elementary School (大久保小学校)
- Tenjin Elementary School (天神小学校)
- Tomihisa Elementary School (富久小学校)
- Totsuka Daiichi Elementary School (戸塚第一小学校)
- Totsuka Daini Elementary School (戸塚第二小学校)
- Totsuka Daisan Elementary School (戸塚第三小学校)
- Toyama Elementary School (戸山小学校)
- Tsukudo Elementary School (津久戸小学校)
- Tsurumaki Elementary School (鶴巻小学校)
- Ushigome-Nakano Elementary School (牛込仲之小学校)
  - Tokyo City Ushigome Elementary School (東京市牛込尋常小学校) opened in 1908 (Meiji 41).
- Waseda Elementary School (早稲田小学校)
- Yochomachi Elementary School (余丁町小学校)
- Yodobashi No. 4 Elementary School (淀橋第四小学校)
- Yotsuya Elementary School (四谷小学校)
- Yotsuya Dairoku (No. 6) Elementary School (四谷第六小学校)

Former schools:

- Ushigome Haramachi Elementary School (牛込原町小学校) - Merged into Ushigome-Nakano Elementary in 1998 (Heisei 10).
- Yodobashi No. 1 Elementary School (淀橋第一小学校) - In 1997 (Heisei 9), merged into Kashiwagi Elementary School
- Yodobashi No. 2 Elementary School (淀橋第二小学校) - Closed March 31, 1986 (Showa 61) - Students moved to Yodobashi No. 6 (淀橋第六小学校)
- Yodobashi No. 3 Elementary School (淀橋第三小学校) - Merged into Nishi Shinjuku Elementary School in 1997
- Yodobashi No. 6 Elementary School (淀橋第六小学校) - Merged into Nishi Shinjuku Elementary School in 1997
- Yodobashi No. 7 Elementary School (淀橋第七小学校) - In 1997, merged into Kashiwagi Elementary School
- Yotsuya No. 1 Elementary School (四谷第一小学校) - Closed March 31, 2002 (Heisei 14) - Students moved to Yodobashi No. 3 Elementary
- Yotsuya No. 3 Elementary School (四谷第三小学校) - Merged into Yotsuya Elementary in 2007 (Heisei 19)
- Yotsuya No. 4 Elementary School (四谷第四小学校) - Merged into Yotsuya Elementary in 2007
- Yotsuya No. 5 Elementary School (四谷第五小学校) - Merged into Hanazono Elementary in 1997
- Yotsuya No. 7 Elementary School (四谷第七小学校) - Merged into Hanazono Elementary in 1997

== Special schools ==
Special schools:

- Shinjuku School for the Handicapped (新宿養護学校)
