= Honoka Hirotani =

Japanese figure skater (b. 2000)

Personal information
- Native name: 廣谷帆香
- Born: Honoka Hirotani; July 1, 2000 (age 26) Aomori Prefecture, Japan

Figure skating career
- Country: Japan

Honoka Hirotani (廣谷帆香) (born July 1, 2000), also "Hoka", is a Japanese figure skater in women's singles. She is originally from Aomori Prefecture and is currently studying at the Faculty of Humanities and Social Sciences at Iwate University.

== Competitive highlights ==
Competition placements until the 2020–21 season
Season	2015–16	2016–17	2017–18	2018–19	2019–20	2020–21
All Japan Championships		18	30		22	22
East Japan Championship		2nd	6	5	2nd	7
Tohoku-Hokkaido Championships	7 J	2nd	1st	1st	1st	2nd
East Japan Junior Championship	11					

== Program music ==
Season	SP	FP
2021-2022, 2020-2021	Everytime You Kissed Me Choreographer: Yuko Hongo	Is Paris Burning? Composer: Takashi Kako Choreographer: Hidetsugu Iwamoto
2018-2019, 2019-2020	"Somewhere" from the TV drama "Glee"; Choreographer: Yuko Hongo	Firebird Composer: Igor Stravinsky Choreographer: Yuko Hongo Spartacus; Composer: Aram Khachaturian
2017-2018, 2016-2017	Tico Tico Music: Zequinha de Avreu; Performance: David Garrett; Choreographer: Misao Sato	Dance of the Polovtsians Composer: Alexander Borodin Choreographer: Misao Sato
