= Fukui Prefectural School for the Visually Impaired =

School in Fukui, Japan

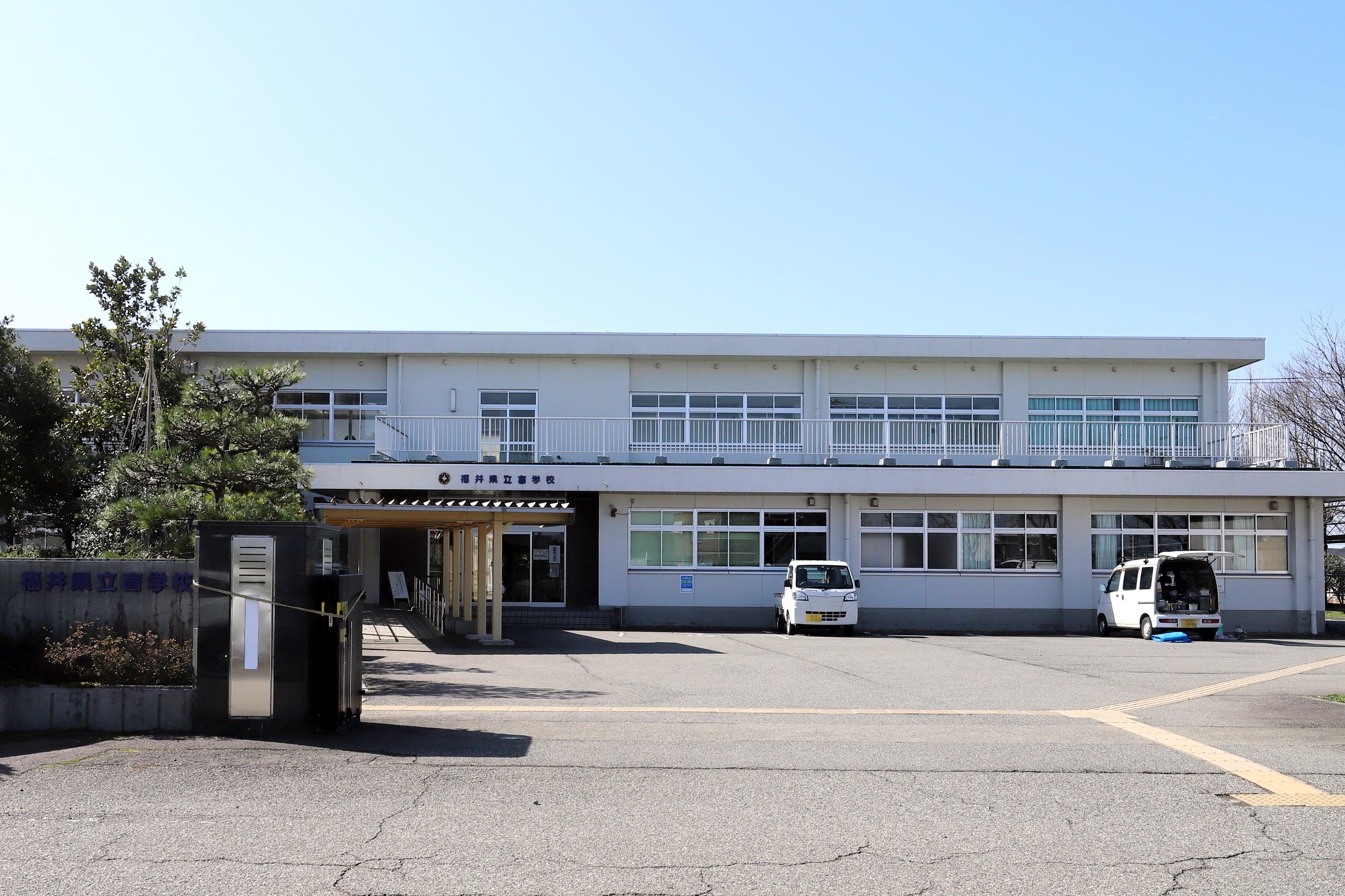

Location
- Fukui, Fukui; Japan
- Coordinates: 36°4′24.7″N 136°15′36.9″E

Information
- Other name: 福井県立盲学校 (Fukui Kenritsu Mōgakkō)
- Established: 10 June 1913
- Website: http://www.fukuipref-sb.ed.jp/

Logo of Fukumō.

Fukui Prefectural School for the Visually Impaired (福井県立盲学校, Fukui Kenritsu Mōgakkō) is a school for the blind located in Fukui, Fukui Prefecture, Japan. The school educates children in regular school subjects as well as basic life skills from kindergarten through high school. The school was founded on June 10, 1913.

== Location ==
The school can be accessed by taking a 15-minute ride on a Keifuku Bus from Fukui Station (on JR-West's Hokuriku Main Line) to the Mōgakkō-mae (盲学校前) bus stop. You can also access it via a 15-minute walk from the Oiwakeguchi Station on the Echizen Railway Katsuyama Eiheiji Line.
