= List of schools in Adachi, Tokyo =

This is a list of municipal schools in Adachi, Tokyo.

The city's public high schools are operated by the Tokyo Metropolitan Government Board of Education.

The city's public elementary and junior high schools are operated by the Adachi City Board of Education (足立区教育委員会).

== High schools ==
Metropolitan high schools:

- Aoi High School
- Adachi High School
- Adachi East High School
- Adachi West High School
- Adachi Shinden High School
- Adachi Technical High School
- Arakawa Commercial High School
- Fuchie High School
- Kohoku High School
- Odaibashi High School

Private high schools:

- Adachi Gakuen Junior and Senior High School
- Juntoku Girls' High School

== Elementary and junior high schools ==
Combined elementary and junior high schools:

- Okimoto Ogi Gakuen (興本扇学園)
- Shinden Gakuen (新田学園)

== Junior high schools ==
Junior high schools:

- No. 1 Junior High School (第一中学校)
- No. 4 Junior High School (第四中学校)
- No. 5 Junior High School (第五中学校)
- No. 6 Junior High School (第六中学校)
- No. 7 Junior High School (第七中学校)
- No. 9 Junior High School (第九中学校)
- No. 10 Junior High School (第十中学校)
- No. 11 Junior High School (第十一中学校)
- No. 12 Junior High School (第十二中学校)
- No. 13 Junior High School (第十三中学校)
- No. 14 Junior High School (第十四中学校)
- Aoi Junior High School (青井中学校)
- Fuchie Junior High School (渕江中学校)
- Hanahata Junior High School (花畑中学校)
- Hanahata Kita Junior High School (花畑北中学校)
- Hanaho Junior High School (花保中学校)
- Higashi Ayase Junior High School (東綾瀬中学校)
- Higashi Shimane Junior High School (東島根中学校)
- Iko Junior High School (伊興中学校)
- Iriya Junior High School (入谷中学校)
- Iriyaminami Junior High School (入谷南中学校)
- Kaga Junior High School (加賀中学校)
- Kanbara Junior High School (蒲原中学校)
- Kohoku Sakura Junior High School (江北桜中学校)
- Konan Junior High School (江南中学校)
- Kurishima Junior High School (栗島中学校)
- Nishi Arai Junior High School (西新井中学校)
- Rokugatsu Junior High School (六月中学校)
- Senju Aoba Junior High School (千寿青葉中学校)
- Senju Sakuratsumi Junior High School (千寿桜堤中学校)
- Shikahama Nanohana Junior High School (鹿浜菜の花中学校)
- Takenozuka Junior High School (竹の塚中学校)
- Yanaka Junior High School (谷中中学校)

== Elementary schools ==
- Adachi Elementary School (足立小学校)
- Adachi Iriya Elementary School (足立入谷小学校)
- Aoi Elementary School (青井小学校)
- Ayase Elementary School (綾瀬小学校)
- Fuchie Elementary School (渕江小学校)
- Fuchie No. 1 Elementary School (渕江第一小学校)
- Hanahata Elementary School (花畑小学校)
- Hanahata No. 1 Elementary School (花畑第一小学校)
- Hanahata Nishi Elementary School (花畑西小学校)
- Hanaho Elementary School (花保小学校)
- Higashi Ayase Elementary School (東綾瀬小学校)
- Higashi Fuchie Elementary School (東渕江小学校)
- Higashi Kahei Elementary School (東加平小学校)
- Higashi Kurihara Elementary School (東栗原小学校)
- Higashi Iko Elementary School (東伊興小学校)
- Hirano Elementary School (平野小学校)
- Hokima Elementary School (保木間小学校)
- Iko Elementary School (伊興小学校)
- Kahei Elementary School (加平小学校)
- Kameda Elementary School (亀田小学校)
- Kita Sanya Elementary School (北三谷小学校)
- Kita Shikahama Elementary School (北鹿浜小学校)
- Kodo Elementary School (弘道小学校)
- Kodo No. 1 Elementary School (弘道第一小学校)
- Kohoku Elementary School (江北小学校)
- Kohiya Elementary School (古千谷小学校)
- Kurihara Elementary School (栗原小学校)
- Kurihara Kita Elementary School (栗原北小学校)
- Kurishima Elementary School (栗島小学校)
- Miyagi Elementary School (宮城小学校)
- Motoki Elementary School (本木小学校)
- Mutsugi Elementary School (六木小学校)
- Nagato Elementary School (長門小学校)
- Nakagawa Elementary School (中川小学校)
- Nakagawa Higashi Elementary School (中川東小学校)
- Nakagawa Kita Elementary School (中川北小学校)
- Nakashimane Elementary School (中島根小学校)
- Nishi-Arai Elementary School (西新井小学校)
- Nishi-Arai No. 1 Elementary School (西新井第一小学校)
- Nishi-Arai No. 2 Elementary School (西新井第二小学校)
- Nishi Hokima Elementary School (西保木間小学校)
- Nishi-Iko Elementary School (西伊興小学校)
- Ogi Elementary School (扇小学校)
- Oka Elementary School (桜花小学校)
- Oyata Elementary School (大谷田小学校)
- Saranuma Elementary School (立皿沼小学校)
- Sekibara Elementary School (関原小学校)
- Senju Elementary School (千寿小学校)
- Senju No. 8 Elementary School (千寿第八小学校)
- Senju Futaba Elementary School (千寿双葉小学校)
- Senju Honcho Elementary School (千寿本町小学校)
- Senju Joto Elementary School (千寿常東小学校)
- Senju Sakura Elementary School (千寿桜小学校)
- Shikahama No. 1 Elementary School (鹿浜第一小学校)
- Shikahama-Goshikizakura Elementary School (鹿浜五色桜小学校)
- Shikahamanishi Elementary School (鹿浜西小学校)
- Shimane Elementary School (島根小学校)
- Takenozuka Elementary School (竹の塚小学校)
- Tatsunuma Elementary School (辰沼小学校)
- Teraji Elementary School (寺地小学校)
- Toneri Elementary School (舎人小学校)
- Toneri No. 1 Elementary School (舎人第一小学校)
- Umejima Elementary School (梅島小学校)
- Umejima No. 1 Elementary School (梅島第一小学校)
- Umejima No. 2 Elementary School (梅島第二小学校)
- Yayoi Elementary School (弥生小学校)
