= Beyooooonds =

Japanese idol girl group

- Origin: Japan
- Genre: J-pop
- Years active: 2018–present
- Labels: Up-Front Works; Zetima
- Members: Miyo Hirai; Honoka Kobayashi; Utano Satoyoshi; Kokoro Maeda; Shiori Nishida; Saya Eguchi; Minami Okamura; Momohime Kiyono; Hana Kojima; Mano Otsubo; Yuna Sugiyama
- Past members: Reina Ichioka; Yuhane Yamazaki; Rika Shimakura; Kurumi Takase
- Website: helloproject.com/beyooooonds/

Beyooooonds (ビヨーンズ, Biyoonzu), is a Japanese idol girl group that formed in October 2018. They released their debut single, "Megane no Otoko no Ko / Nippon no D・N・A! / Go Waist", on August 7, 2019.

== History ==
=== 2018: Formation ===
On October 19, 2018, Beyooooonds was formed. The group is formed of three units, "Chica#Tetsu" led by Reina Ichioka, "Ame no Mori Kawa Umi (雨ノ森 川海)" led by Kurumi Takase and "SeasoningS" led by Miyo Hirai.

=== 2019–2020: Debut and Beyooooond1st ===
On April 30, 2019, the group's major debut was announced for August 7, 2019. They released their debut triple A-side single, "Megane no Otoko no Ko / Nippon no D・N・A! / Go Waist" (眼鏡の男の子/ニッポンノD・N・A！/Go Waist)", on August 7, as previously announced. They released their first album, Beyooooond1st, on November 27. The group's first solo tour was held from December 2–17, 2019, with three performances in three cities. On December 30, the group won the "Best New Artist" award at the 61st Japan Record Awards.

=== 2021–present: Beyooooo2nds ===
Their second single, "Gekikara Love / Now Now Ningen / Konna Hazu ja Nakatta!" (激辛LOVE/Now Now Ningen/こんなハズジャナカッター!), was released on March 3, 2021.

On March 2, 2022, they released their third single, "Eiyū – Waratte! Chopin Senpai / Hamukatsu Mokushiroku" (英雄～笑って!ショパン先輩～/ハムカツ黙示録). Their second album, Beyooooo2nds, was released on September 28.

On April 12, 2023, their fourth single "Motomeyo...Unmei no Tabibitozan / Yume Sae Egakenai Yozora ni wa" (求めよ…運命の旅人算/夢さえ描けない夜空には) was released.

On March 1, 2024, Reina Ichioka graduated from the group, after being on hiatus since December 2023 due to poor health.

Their fifth single, "Hai to Diamond / Go City Go / Hooke no Hōsoku" (灰toダイヤモンド/Go City Go/フックの法則), will be released on May 29.

On April 6 and May 10, BEYOOOOONDS held BEYOOOOOPHONIC II, their second collaboration concert with the Pacific Philharmonia Pops Tokyo orchestra and conductor Fujiwara Ikuro.

On May 27, it was announced that BEYOOOOONDS would join Shiritsu Ebisu Chugaku and ≠ME in a collaboration to celebrate the 1000th episode of the anime Pretty Cure. The groups will be featured dancing classic themes throughout anime's broadcasts during the month of June, with additional dance videos posted to the Pretty Cure TikTok account.

On May 29, the group released their fifth single, "Hai to Diamond / Go City Go / Hooke no Housoku"

On June 27, 2024, Yuhane Yamazaki graduated from the group and Hello! Project.

On January 29, 2025, the group released their sixth single, "Do-Did-Done / Aa Kimi ni Tensei".

On June 9, 2025, Rika Shimakura graduated from the group and Hello! Project in order to study English abroad. She is also set to continue her entertainment activities.

On August 26, 2025, it was announced that Momohime Kiyono would be halting activities for the time being due to her being diagnosed with anxiety disorder. As a result, she would be absent from all activities up until the end of October, including the August 30 and 31 concerts of the Hello! Con 2025 tour, the Trendy Taipei J-POP NIGHT event on September 7, the SPARK 2025 in MAKUHARI event on September 14, the entirety of the BEYOOOOOPERETTA -ottobre- in October, and the release events of the single "SaiKOO DE DANCE" in September and October. It was also announced that her FC event with Minami Okamura scheduled for September 16 would be cancelled as well.

On January 30, it was announced that Kurumi Takase would be graduating from the group and Hello! Project at the end of the group's upcoming spring tour on June 16.

On May 26, it was announced that there would be more new members joining the group, as well as Morning Musume '26.

On May 27, it was announced that new members of the group, as well as Morning Musume '26, would be revealed one at a time through the individual group YouTube channels, with the first reveals for Morning Musume '26 on the 28th, and BEYOOOOONDS on the 29th.

On May 29, it was announced that Hana Kojima joined the group as a new member.

On June 2, it was announced Through the official BEYOOOOONDS channel that Mano Otsubo joined BEYOOOOONDS as the second new member.

On June 9, it was announced that Yuna Sugiyama joined BEYOOOOONDS as the last new member.

On June 16, Kurumi Takase graduated from the group.

== Members ==
=== Current ===
- Miyo Hirai (平井美葉) - Leader (2018–Present)
- Honoka Kobayashi (小林萌花) (2018–Present)
- Utano Satoyoshi (里吉うたの) (2018–Present)
- Kokoro Maeda (前田こころ) (2018–Present)
- Shiori Nishida (西田汐里) (2018–Present)
- Saya Eguchi (江口紗耶) (2018–Present)
- Minami Okamura (岡村美波) (2018–Present)
- Momohime Kiyono (清野桃々姫) (2018–Present)
- Hana Kojima (小島はな) (2026–Present)
- Mano Otsubo (大坪茉乃) (2026–Present)
- Yuna Sugiyama (杉山結菜) (2026–Present)

=== Former ===
- Reina Ichioka (一岡伶奈) - Leader (2018–2024)
- Yuhane Yamazaki (山﨑夢羽) (2018–2024)
- Rika Shimakura (島倉りか) (2018–2025)
- Kurumi Takase (高瀬くるみ) - Leader (2018–2026)

== Discography ==
=== Studio albums ===
Title	Album details	Peak chart positions		Sales
Title	Album details	Oricon	Hot Albums	Sales
Beyooooond1st	Released: November 27, 2019; Label: Zetima; Formats: CD, digital download	3	6	JPN: 26,692
Beyooooo2nds	Released: September 28, 2022; Label: Zetima; Formats: CD, digital download	3	4	JPN: 25,320
Beyooooonds 3rd	Released: December 10, 2025; Label: Zetima; Formats: CD, digital download	3	27	JPN: 19,364

=== Singles ===
Title	Year	Peak chart positions		Sales	Certifications	Album
Title	Year	JPN	JPN Hot	Sales	Certifications	Album
"Megane no Otoko no Ko / Nippon no D・N・A! / Go Waist" (眼鏡の男の子/ニッポンノD・N・A！/Go Waist)	2019	1	2	JPN: 112,367	RIAJ: Gold (phy.)	Beyooooond1st
"Gekikara Love / Now Now Ningen / Konna Hazu ja Nakatta!" (激辛LOVE/Now Now Ningen/こんなハズジャナカッター!)	2021	1	9	JPN: 73,230		Beyooooo2nds
"Eiyū – Waratte! Chopin Senpai / Hamukatsu Mokushiroku" (英雄～笑って!ショパン先輩～/ハムカツ黙示録)	2022	2	4	JPN: 83,814	RIAJ: Gold (phy.)	Beyooooo2nds
"Motomeyo...Unmei no Tabibitozan / Yume Sae Egakenai Yozora ni wa" (求めよ…運命の旅人算/夢さえ描けない夜空には)	2023	3	5	JPN: 73,745	RIAJ: Gold (phy.)	Non-album singles
"Hai to Diamond / Go City Go / Hooke no Hōsoku" (灰toダイヤモンド/Go City Go/フックの法則)	2024	3	7	JPN: 68,078		Non-album singles
"Do-Did-Done / Aa Kimi ni Tensei" (Do-Did-Done/あゝ君に転生)	2025	2	7	JPN: 71,163	RIAJ: Gold (phy.)	Non-album singles
"Saikoo de Dance" (最KOO DE DANCE) (with DJ Koo)	2025	—	61			Non-album singles

== Awards and nominations ==
Award ceremony	Year	Category	Nominee(s)/work(s)	Result	Ref.
Japan Record Awards	2019	Best New Artist	Beyooooonds	Won	

Preceded by Yuto Tatsumi	Japan Record Award for Best New Artist; 2019	Succeeded by Naoki Sanada
