= Narita Kokusai High School =

- 千葉県立成田国際高等学校
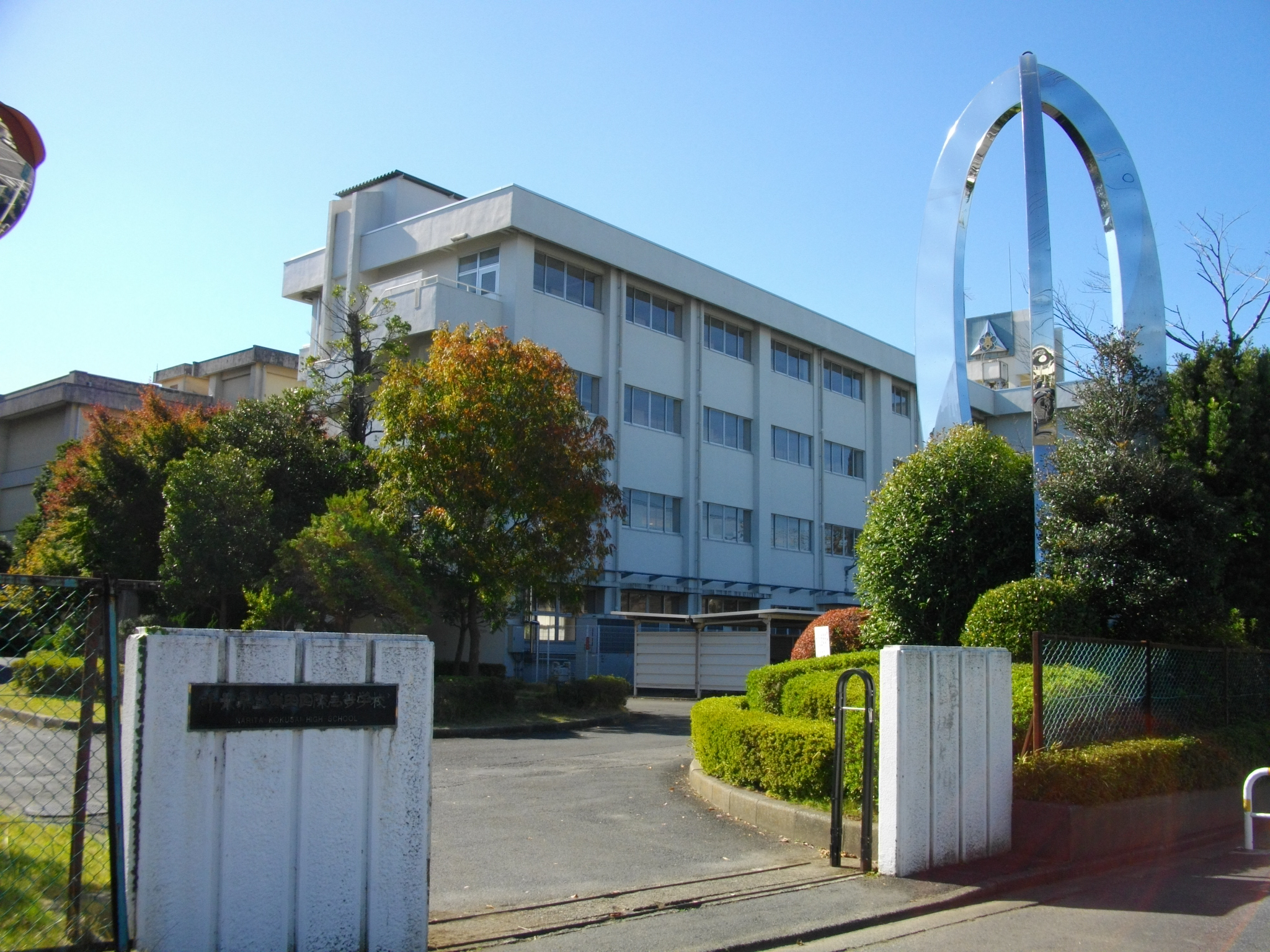

Location
- 3-16 Karabe, Narita, Chiba Prefecture, Japan 〒286-0036 〒286-0036 千葉県成田市加良部3-16
- Coordinates: 35.7779°N 140.3061°E

Information
- Type: Public high school
- Motto: Sincerely・Creativity・Friendship
- Established: 1975
- Grades: 10-12 (senior high years 1-3)
- Website: Official Website; English Official Website

Chiba Prefectural Narita Kokusai High School (千葉県立成田国際高等学校, Chiba-kenritsu Narita Kokusai Kōtōgakkō; "Narita International High School"), nicknamed Narikoku (成国), is a senior high school in Narita, Chiba.

The school offers an "international course".

Viewbank College in Australia has an association with Narita Kokusai. Kennedy High School in Cedar Rapids, Iowa is the sister school and does exchange programs with Narita.

== History ==
It opened in 1975 as Chiba Prefectural Narita Nishi (West) High School (千葉県立成田西高等学校 Chiba-kenritsu Narita Nishi Kōtōgakkō). In 1992 it was given its current name.
