= List of elementary schools in Chiba Prefecture =

This is a list of elementary schools in Chiba Prefecture.

== Municipal schools ==
=== Chiba City ===
This is a list of elementary schools of Chiba City:

Chuo-ku

- Benten (弁天小学校)
- Daiganji (大巌寺小学校)
- Honcho (本町小学校)
- Hoshikuki (星久喜小学校)
- Innai (院内小学校)
- Kawado (川戸小学校)
- Matsugaoka (松ケ丘小学校)
- Miyako (都小学校)
- Miyazaki (宮崎小学校)
- Nitona (仁戸名小学校)
- Nobuto (登戸小学校)
- Oihama (生浜小学校)
- Oihama Higashi (生浜東小学校)
- Oihama Nishi (生浜西小学校)
- Omori (大森小学校)
- Samugawa (寒川小学校)
- Shinjuku (新宿小学校)
- Soga (蘇我小学校)
- Tsurusawa (鶴沢小学校)

Hanamigawa-ku

- Asahigaoka (朝日ケ丘小学校)
- Hanamigawa (花見川小学校)
- Hanamigawa No. 3 (花見川第三小学校)
- Hanashima (花島小学校)
- Hanazono (花園小学校)
- Hata (畑小学校)
- Kashiwai (柏井小学校)
- Kemigawa (検見川小学校)
- Kotehashi (犢橋小学校)
- Kotehashidai (こてはし台小学校)
- Makuhari (幕張小学校)
- Makuhari Higashi (幕張東小学校)
- Makuhari Minami (幕張南小学校)
- Mizuho (瑞穂小学校)
- Nagasaku (長作小学校)
- Nishikonakadai (西小中台小学校)
- Nishinoya (西の谷小学校)
- Sakushin (作新小学校)
- Satsukigaoka Higashi (さつきが丘東小学校)
- Satsukigaoka Nishi (さつきが丘西小学校)
- Uenodai (上の台小学校)
- Yokodo (横戸小学校)

Inage-ku

- Ayamedai (あやめ台小学校)
- Chigusadai (千草台小学校)
- Chigusadai Higashi (千草台東小学校)
- Inagaoka (稲丘小学校)
- Inage (稲毛小学校)
- Kashiwadai (柏台小学校)
- Konakadai (小中台小学校)
- Konakadai Minami (小中台南小学校)
- Kusano (草野小学校)
- Midorimachi (緑町小学校)
- Miyanogi (宮野木小学校)
- Sanno (山王小学校)
- Sonno (園生小学校)
- Todorokicho (轟町小学校)
- Tsuga (都賀小学校)
- Yayoi (弥生小学校)

Midori-ku

- Ariyoshi (有吉小学校)
- Asumigaoka (あすみが丘小学校)
- Hirayama (平山小学校)
- Honda (誉田小学校)
- Honda Higashi (誉田東小学校)
- Izumiya (泉谷小学校)
- Kanezawa (金沢小学校)
- Koyatsu (小谷小学校)
- Ochi (越智小学校)
- Ogida (扇田小学校)
- Oji (大椎小学校)
- Okido (大木戸小学校)
- Oyumino Minami (おゆみ野南小学校)
- Shiina (椎名小学校)
- Toke (土気小学校)
- Toke Minami (土気南小学校)

Mihama-ku

- Kaihin Utase (海浜打瀬小学校)
- Inage No. 2 (稲毛第二小学校)
- Inahama (稲浜小学校)
- Isobe (磯辺小学校)
- Isobe No. 3 (磯辺第三小学校)
- Makuhari Nishi (幕張西小学校
- Masago No. 5 (真砂第五小学校)
- Masago Higashi (真砂東小学校)
- Masago Nishi (真砂西小学校)
- Mihama Utase (美浜打瀬小学校)
- Saiwaicho (幸町小学校)
- Saiwaicho No. 3 (幸町第三小学校)
- Takahama No. 1 (高浜第一小学校)
- Takahama Kaihin (高浜海浜小学校)
- Takasu (高洲小学校)
- Takasu No. 3 (高洲第三小学校)
- Takasu No. 4 (高洲第四小学校)
- Utase (打瀬小学校)

Wakaba-ku

- Chishiro (千城小学校)
- Chishirodai Higashi (千城台東小学校)
- Chishirodai Mirai (千城台みらい小学校)
- Chishirodai Wakaba (千城台わかば小学校)
- Kita Kaizuka (北貝塚小学校)
- Minamoto (源小学校)
- Mitsuwadai Kita (みつわ台北小学校)
- Mitsuwadai Minami (みつわ台南小学校)
- Ogura (小倉小学校)
- Omiya (大宮小学校)
- Sakazuki (坂月小学校)
- Sakuragi (桜木小学校)
- Sarashima (更科小学校)
- Shirai (白井小学校)
- Tsuganodai (都賀の台小学校)
- Wakamatsu (若松小学校)
- Wakamatsudai (若松台小学校)

Former elementary schools

- Hanamigawa-ku
  - Hanamigawa No. 1 (花見川第一小学校)
  - Hanamigawa No. 2 (花見川第二小学校)
  - Hanamigawa No. 4 (花見川第四小学校)
  - Hanamigawa No. 5 (花見川第五小学校)
- Mihama-ku
  - Isobe No. 1 (磯辺第一小学校)
  - Isobe No. 2 (磯辺第二小学校)
  - Isobe No. 4 (磯辺第四小学校)
  - Masago No. 1 (真砂第一小学校)
  - Masago No. 2 (真砂第二小学校)
  - Masago No. 3 (真砂第三小学校)
  - Masago No. 4 (真砂第四小学校)
  - Saiwaicho No. 1 (幸町第一小学校)
  - Saiwaicho No. 2 (幸町第二小学校)
  - Saiwaicho No. 4 (幸町第四小学校)
  - Takahama No. 2 (高浜第二小学校)
  - Takahama No. 3 (高浜第三小学校)
  - Takasu No. 1 (高洲第一小学校)
  - Takasu No. 2 (高洲第二小学校)
- Wakaba-ku
  - Chishirodai Asahi (千城台旭小学校)
  - Chishirodai Kita (千城台北小学校)
  - Chishirodai Minami (千城台南小学校)
  - Chishirodai Nishi (千城台西小学校)
  - Omiyadai (大宮台小学校)

=== Kyonan ===
- Kyonan Elementary School (鋸南小学校)

The former Katsuyama Elementary School (勝山小学校) and Yasuda Elementary School (保田小学校) merged into Kyonan Elementary in 2014, with the Katsuyama building becoming the Kyonan Elementary building.

=== Minamiboso ===
There is a municipal combined elementary and junior high school, Tomiyama Elementary and Junior High School a.k.a. Tomiyama Gakuen School (南房総市立富山学園).

Municipal elementary schools:

- Chikura Elementary School (千倉小学校)
- Miyoshi Elementary School (三芳小学校)
- Reinan Elementary School (嶺南小学校)
- Shirahama Elementary School (白浜小学校)
- Tomiura Elementary School (富浦小学校)

=== Narita ===
Municipal combined elementary and junior high schools:

- Shimofusa Midori Gakuen (下総みどり学園)
- Taiei Mirai Gakuen (大栄みらい学園)

Municipal elementary schools:

- Azuma (吾妻小学校)
- Habu (八生小学校)
- Hashigadai (橋賀台小学校)
- Heisei (平成小学校)
- Honjo (本城小学校)
- Jinguji (神宮寺小学校)
- Karabe (加良部小学校)
- Kouzu (公津小学校)
- Kouzunomori (公津の杜小学校)
- Kuzumi (久住小学校)
- Misatodai (美郷台小学校)
- Mukoudai (向台小学校)
- Nakadai (中台小学校)
- Narita (成田小学校)
- Niiyama (新山小学校)
- Sanrizuka (三里塚小学校)
- Tamatsukuri (玉造小学校)
- Tohyama (遠山小学校)
- Toyosumi (豊住小学校)

==== Urayasu ====
Municipal elementary schools:

- Akemi (明海小学校)
- Akemi Minami (明海南小学校)
- Higashi (東小学校)
- Higashino (東野小学校)
- Hinode (日の出小学校)
- Hinode Minami (日の出南小学校)
- Hokubu (北部小学校)
- Irifune (入船小学校)
- Maihama (舞浜小学校)
- Miakegawa (見明川小学校)
- Mihama Kita (美浜北小学校)
- Mihama Minami (美浜南小学校)
- Minami (南小学校)
- Takasu (高洲小学校)
- Takasu Kita (高洲北小学校)
- Tomioka (富岡小学校)
- Urayasu (浦安小学校)

=== Other municipalities ===
Hota Shiosai Elementary School (保田しおさい学校) is physically located in Kyonan, but it is a municipally-operated school by Katsushika City, Tokyo.

== Private ==
- Chiba Korean Primary and Junior High School
- Makuhari International School

== See also ==
- List of high schools in Chiba Prefecture
- List of junior high schools in Chiba Prefecture
