= Honoka & Azita =

- Origin: Honolulu, Hawaii, U.S.
- Years active: 2013–2019
- Members: Honoka Katayama; Azita Ganjali
- Website: www.honokamusic.com

Honoka & Azita was a ukulele musical duo from Hawaii, United States, and are known for their fast fingers and unique arrangements of popular and original songs. Honoka Katayama (born 1998) and Azita Ganjali (born 2000) were students of Jody Kamisato (now their manager), and met in the Ukulele Hale studio in Honolulu. In 2013, they entered the local International Ukulele Contest together. They won 1st place in their division, and were named the contest's MVP (Most Valuable Player). After the contest, they opened for the popular music festival in Okinawa, Japan, and regularly performed at the Hard Rock Cafe in Honolulu.

In September 2017 they performed at the 8th Rice Fest in Honolulu.

At the 2017 Los Angeles International Ukulele Festival, Honoka and Azita were instructors of the workshops for beginners.

The Hawaiian Airlines Facebook Page featured Honoka & Azita performing their first own composition "Island Fire", and called them one of Hawaii's most popular duos.

On 5 December 2017 they appeared at KITV television station in the Island News promoting Ukulele contest coming in February 2018.

On January 4, 2019, they released a video announcing that Azita will be pursuing a career in medicine, and that Honoka will be continuing as a solo artist.

== Discography ==
- 2015: Island Style Ukulele - 2 CD compilation, awarded the 2015 Na Hoku Hanohano Awards Compilation Album of the Year
- 2016: Debut EP Album - 2 instrumental surf rock classics plus 2 original compositions
- 2017: Na Mele Ukulele CD - cover of Do The Hula on the Na Mele Ukulele Compilation Album
