= List of elementary schools in Saitama Prefecture =

This is a list of elementary schools in Saitama Prefecture.

== National ==
- Elementary School attached to Saitama University School of Education

== Municipal ==
=== Saitama City ===
Chūō-ku

- Kami Ochiai (上落合小学校)
- Oto (大戸小学校)
- Shimo Ochiai (下落合小学校)
- Suzuya (鈴谷小学校)
- Yono Hachiman (与野八幡小学校)
- Yono Honmachi (与野本町小学校)
- Yono Minami (与野南小学校)
- Yono Seihoku (与野西北小学校)

Iwatsuki-ku

- Higashi Iwatsuki (東岩槻小学校)
- Iwatsuki (岩槻小学校)
- Jionji (慈恩寺小学校)
- Jouhoku (城北小学校)
- Jounan (城南小学校)
- Kamisato (上里小学校)
- Kashiwazaki (柏崎小学校)
- Kawadoori (川通小学校)
- Kawai (河合小学校)
- Niiwa (新和小学校)
- Nishihara (西原小学校)
- Ota (太田小学校)
- Tokuriki (徳力小学校)
- Wado (和土小学校)

Kita-ku

- Higashi Onari (東大成小学校)
- Miyahara (宮原小学校)
- Nisshin (日進小学校)
- Nisshin Kita (日進北小学校)
- Omiya Bessho (大宮別所小学校)
- Osato (大砂土小学校)
- Taihei (泰平小学校)
- Tsubasa (つばさ小学校)
- Uetake (植竹小学校)

Midori-ku

- Daimon (大門小学校)
- Harayama (原山小学校)
- Mimuro (三室小学校)
- Misono (美園小学校)
- Misono Kita (美園北小学校)
- Nakao (中尾小学校)
- Noda (野田小学校)
- Omagi (尾間木小学校)
- Omaki (大牧小学校)
- Saido (道祖土小学校)
- Shibahara (芝原小学校)

Minami-ku

- Buzo (文蔵小学校)
- Minami Urawa (南浦和小学校)
- Mukai (向小学校)
- Nishi Urawa (西浦和小学校)
- Numakage (沼影小学校)
- Oyaba (大谷場小学校)
- Oyaba Higashi (大谷場東小学校)
- Oyaguchi (大谷口小学校)
- Tsuji (辻小学校)
- Tsuji Minami (辻南小学校)
- Urawa Bessho (浦和別所小学校)
- Urawa Osato (浦和大里小学校)
- Yada (谷田小学校)
- Zenmae (善前小学校)

Minuma-ku

- Ebinuma (海老沼小学校)
- Haruno (春野小学校)
- Haruoka (春岡小学校)
- Hasunuma (蓮沼小学校)
- Higashi Miyashita (東宮下小学校)
- Katayanagi (片柳小学校)
- Minuma (見沼小学校)
- Nanasato (七里小学校)
- Osato Higashi (大砂土東小学校)
- Oya (大谷小学校)
- Shima (島小学校)

Nishi-ku

- Mamiya Higashi (馬宮東小学校)
- Mamiyanishi (馬宮西小学校)
- Miyamae (宮前小学校)
- Omiya Nishi (大宮西小学校)
- Sakae (栄小学校)
- Sashiogi (指扇小学校)
- Sashiogi Kita (指扇北小学校)
- Uemizu (植水小学校)

Omiya-ku

- Kamiko (上小小学校)
- Mihashi (三橋小学校)
- Omiya (大宮小学校)
- Omiya Higashi (立大宮東小学校)
- Omiya Kita (大宮北小学校)
- Omiya Minami (大宮南小学校)
- Onari (大成小学校)
- Sakuragi (桜木小学校)
- Shibakawa (芝川小学校)

Sakura-ku

- Jinde (神田小学校)
- Nakajima (中島小学校)
- Okubo (大久保小学校)
- Okubo Higashi (大久保東小学校)
- Sakawa (栄和小学校)
- Shibiraki (新開小学校)
- Tajima (田島小学校)
- Tsuchiai (土合小学校)

Urawa-ku

- Daito (大東小学校)
- Harigaya (針ヶ谷小学校)
- Kami Kizaki (上木崎小学校)
- Kishicho (岸町小学校)
- Kita Urawa (北浦和小学校)
- Kizaki (木崎小学校)
- Motobuto (本太小学校)
- Nakacho (仲町小学校)
- Nakamoto (仲本小学校)
- Takasogo (高砂小学校)
- Tokiwa (常盤小学校)
- Tokiwa Kita (常盤北小学校)

== Private ==
- Saitama Korean Elementary and Middle School (埼玉朝鮮初中級学校). This school was previously in the City of Ōmiya.

== See also ==
- List of junior high schools in Saitama Prefecture
