= List of junior high schools in Chiba Prefecture =

Chiba Prefecture, located in the Kantō region of Japan, is home to a variety of junior high schools that provide education to students typically aged 12 to 15. The prefecture includes schools in its capital, Chiba City, and other municipalities like Narita, known for its international airport, and Funabashi, a vibrant urban area. These schools operate under the Japanese educational system, emphasizing a curriculum that includes core subjects, extracurricular activities, and cultural education. Many junior high schools in Chiba are managed by municipal governments, with some private institutions offering alternative options. The schools serve diverse communities, reflecting the mix of urban, suburban, and rural areas characteristic of Chiba Prefecture.This is a list of junior high schools in Chiba Prefecture.

== Municipal ==
=== Chiba City ===
This is a list of junior high schools of Chiba City:

Chuo-ku

- Hoshikuki (星久喜中学校)
- Katsuragi (葛城中学校)
- Kawado (川戸中学校)
- Matsugaoka (松ケ丘中学校)
- Oihama (生浜中学校)
- Shinjuku (新宿中学校)
- Soga (蘇我中学校)
- Suehiro (末広中学校)
- Tsubakimori (椿森中学校)

Hanamigawa-ku

- Amado (天戸中学校)
- Asahigaoka (朝日ケ丘中学校)
- Hanamigawa (花見川中学校)
- Hanazono (花園中学校)
- Kotehashi (犢橋中学校)
- Kotehashidai (こてはし台中学校)
- Makuhari (幕張中学校)
- Makuhari Hongo (幕張本郷中学校)
- Midorigaoka (緑が丘中学校)
- Satsukigaoka (さつきが丘中学校)

Inage-ku

- Chigusadai (千草台中学校)
- Inage (稲毛中学校)
- Konakadai (小中台中学校)
- Kusano (草野中学校)
- Midorimachi (緑町中学校)
- Todorokicho (轟町中学校)
- Tsuga (都賀中学校)

Midori-ku

- Ariyoshi (有吉中学校)
- Honda (誉田中学校)
- Izumiya (泉谷中学校)
- Ochi (越智中学校)
- Oji (大椎中学校)
- Oyumino Minami (おゆみ野南中学校)
- Toke (土気中学校)
- Toke Minami (土気南中学校)

Mihama-ku

- Inage Senior High School Affiliated Junior High School (稲毛高附属中学校)
- Inahama (稲浜中学校)
- Isobe (磯辺中学校)
- Makuhari Nishi (幕張西中学校)
- Masago (真砂中学校)
- Sawaicho No. 1 (幸町第一中学校)
- Sawaicho No. 2 (幸町第二中学校)
- Takahama (高浜中学校)
- Takasu (高洲中学校)
- Utase (打瀬中学校)

Wakaba-ku

- Chishirodaiminami (千城台南中学校)
- Chishirodainishi (千城台西中学校)
- Kaizuka (貝塚中学校)
- Kasori (加曽利中学校)
- Mitsuwadai (みつわ台中学校)
- Omiya (大宮中学校)
- Sanno (山王中学校)
- Sarashina (更科中学校)
- Shirai (白井中学校)
- Wakamatsu (若松中学校)

Former junior high schools

- Hanamigawa-ku
  - Hamamigawa No. 1 (花見川第一中学校)
  - Hamamigawa No. 2 (花見川第二中学校)
- Mihama-ku
  - Isobe No. 1 (磯辺第一中学校)
  - Isobe No. 2 (磯辺第二中学校)
  - Masago No. 1 (真砂第一中学校)
  - Masago No. 2 (真砂第二中学校)
  - Takasu No. 1 (高洲第一中学校)
  - Takasu No. 2 (高洲第二中学校)

=== Kisarazu ===
- Fukuta (富来田中学校)
- Hatazawa (畑沢中学校)
- Iwane (岩根中学校)
- Iwane Nishi (岩根西中学校)
- Kamatari (鎌足中学校)
- Kaneda (金田中学校)
- Kisarazu No. 1 (木更津第一中学校)
- Kisarazu No. 2 (木更津第二中学校)
- Kisarazu No. 3 (木更津第二中学校)
- Kiyokawa (清川中学校)
- Namioka (波岡中学校)
- Ohda (太田中学校)

=== Minamiboso ===
There is a municipal combined elementary and junior high school, Tomiyama Elementary and Junior High School a.k.a. Tomiyama Gakuen School (南房総市立富山学園).

Municipal junior high schools:

- Minamiboso Junior High School (南房総中学校) (opened on April 1, 2024 a.k.a. Reiwa 6)
- Miyoshi Junior High School (三芳中学校)
- Reinan Junior High School (嶺南中学校)
- Tomiura Junior High School (富浦中学校)

Former schools:

- Chikura Junior High School (千倉中学校) (closed on March 31, 2024)
- Shirahama Junior High School (白浜中学校) (closed on March 31, 2024)

=== Narita ===
Municipal combined elementary and junior high schools:

- Shimofusa Midori Gakuen (下総みどり学園)
- Taiei Mirai Gakuen (大栄みらい学園)

Municipal junior high schools:

- Azuma (吾妻中学校)
- Kozunomori (津の杜中学校)
- Kusumi (久住中学校)
- Nakadai (中台中学校)
- Narita (成田中学校)
- Nishi (西中学校)
- Tamatsukuri (玉造中学校)
- Toyama (遠山中学校)

=== Urayasu ===
- Akemi (明海中学校)
- Hinode (日の出中学校)
- Horie (堀江中学校)
- Irifune (入船中学校)
- Miakegawa (見明川中学校)
- Mihama (美浜中学校)
- Takasu (高洲中学校)
- Tomioka (富岡中学校)
- Urayasu (浦安中学校)

=== Other municipalities ===
- Kyonan: Kyonan Junior High School (鋸南中学校)

== Private ==
- Chiba Korean Primary and Junior High School
- Makuhari Junior and Senior High School
- Narita Private Junior and Senior High School (成田高等学校・付属中学校)
- Rugby School Japan
- Tokai University Urayasu Junior & Senior High School

== See also ==
- List of high schools in Chiba Prefecture
- List of elementary schools in Chiba Prefecture
