= Chiba Port Arena =

Indoor arena in Chiba, Japan

Coordinates: 35°36′11″N 140°6′42″E

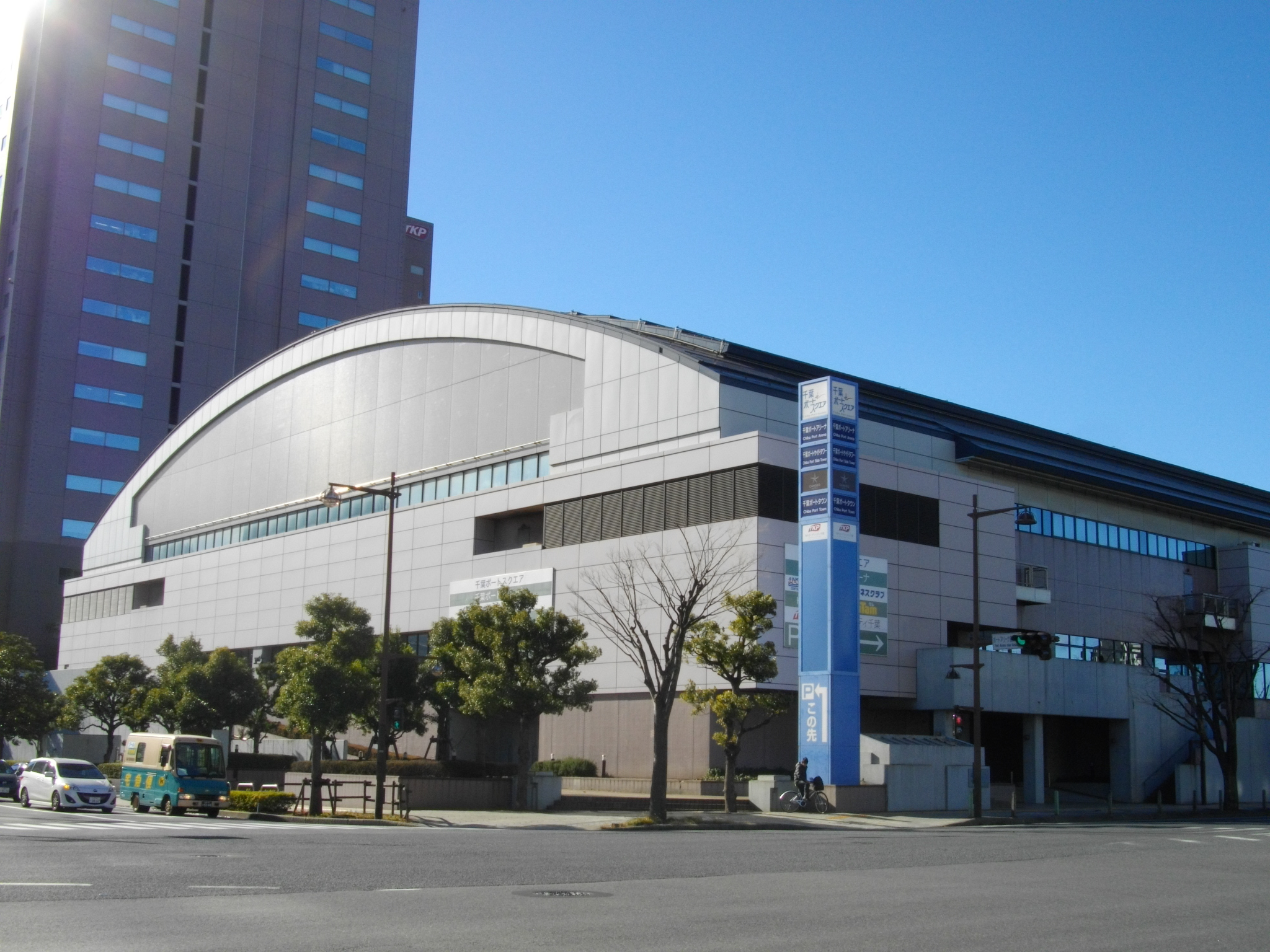

- Location within Chiba Prefecture Location within Japan
- Interactive map of Chiba Port Arena
- Location: Chiba, Japan
- Owner: Chiba City
- Operator: Chiba City Sports Association
- Capacity: 7,512
- Scoreboard: Panasonic 240-inch screen

Construction
- Opened: March 25, 1991

Tenants
- Altiri Chiba; Chiba Jets Funabashi

Website
- Homepage

The Chiba Port Arena (千葉ポートアリーナ, Chiba Pōto Arīna) is an indoor arena in Chiba, Japan. Chiba Jets Funabashi plays some games here as the second home arena.

== Facilities ==
- Main arena - 2,730 sqm （63.5m×40m）
- Sub arena - 769.6 sqm （38.0m×22m）

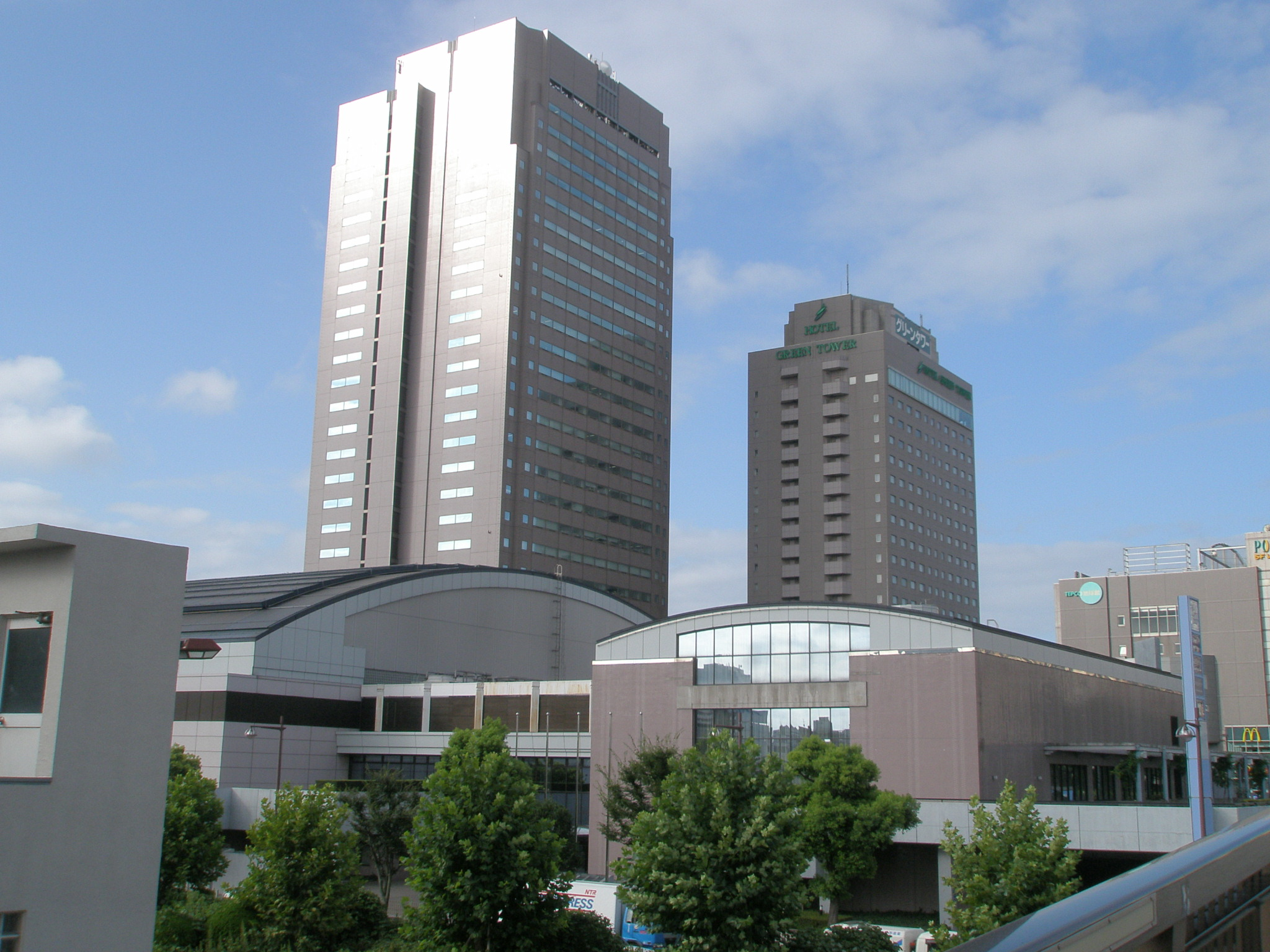
Arena is the part of Chiba Port Square

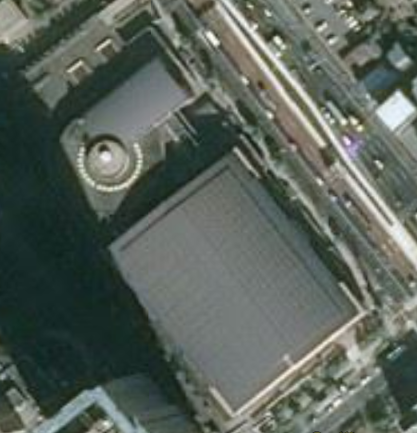
Satellite view

== Events ==
- Volkswagen Ogimura Cup 2007 (Table Tennis)
- The 65th All Japan Gymnastics Championships
- Yonex BWF World Junior Badminton Championships
- 2014 Japan Para wheelchair rugby competitions
- The 68th All Japan Gymnastics Championship
- 2014 All Japan High School Sports Meeting (Badminton)
- 2021 Asian Men's Volleyball Championship

== Access ==
- Chiba Monorail: 8-min walk from Shiyakusho-mae Station.
- Train: 16-min walk from Chiba Station.
- Alternatively, 15-min walk from Chibaminato Station. (JR Keiyo Line); or take monorail to Shiyakusho-mae Station, and 12-min walk from Chiba Chuo Station (Keisei Line).
- Bus: From Chiba Sta. or Chiba Chuo Sta. Get off at Port Arena.
- Alternatively, Chiba Kaihin Kotsu Bus for Saiwaimachi Danchi, Inage Kaigan, Kaihin Hospital. Get off at Port Arena.
