= Flying junction =

Type of railway junction

Flying junction: with a bridge, trains do not block each other

A flying junction or flyover is a railway junction at which one or more diverging or converging tracks in a multiple-track route cross other tracks on the route by bridge to avoid conflict with other train movements. A more technical term is "grade-separated junction". A burrowing junction or dive-under occurs where the diverging line passes below the main line.

The alternative to grade separation is a level junction or flat junction, where tracks cross at grade, and conflicting routes must be protected by interlocked signals.

== Complexity ==
Fretin triangle in France: Each side is more than 3 km (2 mi) long. A grade-separated wye. TGV and Eurostar trains cross the junction at 300 km/h (186 mph).

Simple flying junctions may have a single track pass over or under other tracks to avoid conflict; complex flying junctions may have elaborate infrastructure to allow multiple routings without trains coming into conflict, in the manner of a highway stack interchange.

== Flying junction without crossings ==
Where two lines each of two tracks merge with a flying junction, they can become a four-track railway together, the tracks paired by direction. This happens regularly in the Netherlands (see Examples below).

== High-speed rail ==
Nearly all junctions with high-speed railways are grade-separated. On the French Lignes à Grande Vitesse (TGV) high-speed network, the principal junction on the LGV Sud-Est, at Pasilly where the line to Dijon diverges, and on the LGV Atlantique at Courtalain where the line to Le Mans diverges, are fully grade-separated with special high-speed switches (points in British terminology) that permit the normal line speed of 300 km/h (186 mph) on the main line, and a diverging speed of 220 km/h (137 mph). (Note: See "Courtalain" on the French language Wikipedia.)

The LGV network has four grade-separated high-speed triangles, in Fretin (near Lille), Coubert (southeast of Paris), Claye-Souilly (northeast of Paris), and Angles (in the agglomeration of Avignon). A fifth, Vémars (northeast of Paris), is grade-separated except for the least-used side, linking Paris Gare du Nord and Paris CDG airport via a single-lead junction.

In Japan, despite the vast coverage of the Shinkansen, there are only two such flyover junctions, both under the jurdistiction of JR East. Trains bound for the Joetsu and Hokuriku Shinkansen lines diverge from the Tohoku Shinkansen at a junction approximately 8 km (5.0 mi) north of Omiya Station. The other is located at a switch 4 km (2.5 mi) north of Takasaki Station where the Joetsu and Hokuriku Shinkansen Lines split. Currently, a third flyover junction is under construction at Fukushima Station which will allow services on the Yamagata Shinkansen to continue northward on the Ou Main Line. The junction and 540 m (1,770 ft) of new elevated track is expected to open for service in 2026.

== Examples ==
Australia

- Bowen Hills railway station in Brisbane
- Burnley railway station in Melbourne
- Camberwell railway station in Melbourne
- Sydney Central Station
- Glenfield railway station, Sydney
- Strathfield railway station
- Sandgate Flyover, Newcastle – main line flies over coal branch line
- Goodwood railway station in Adelaide
- Bayswater railway station in Perth

Canada

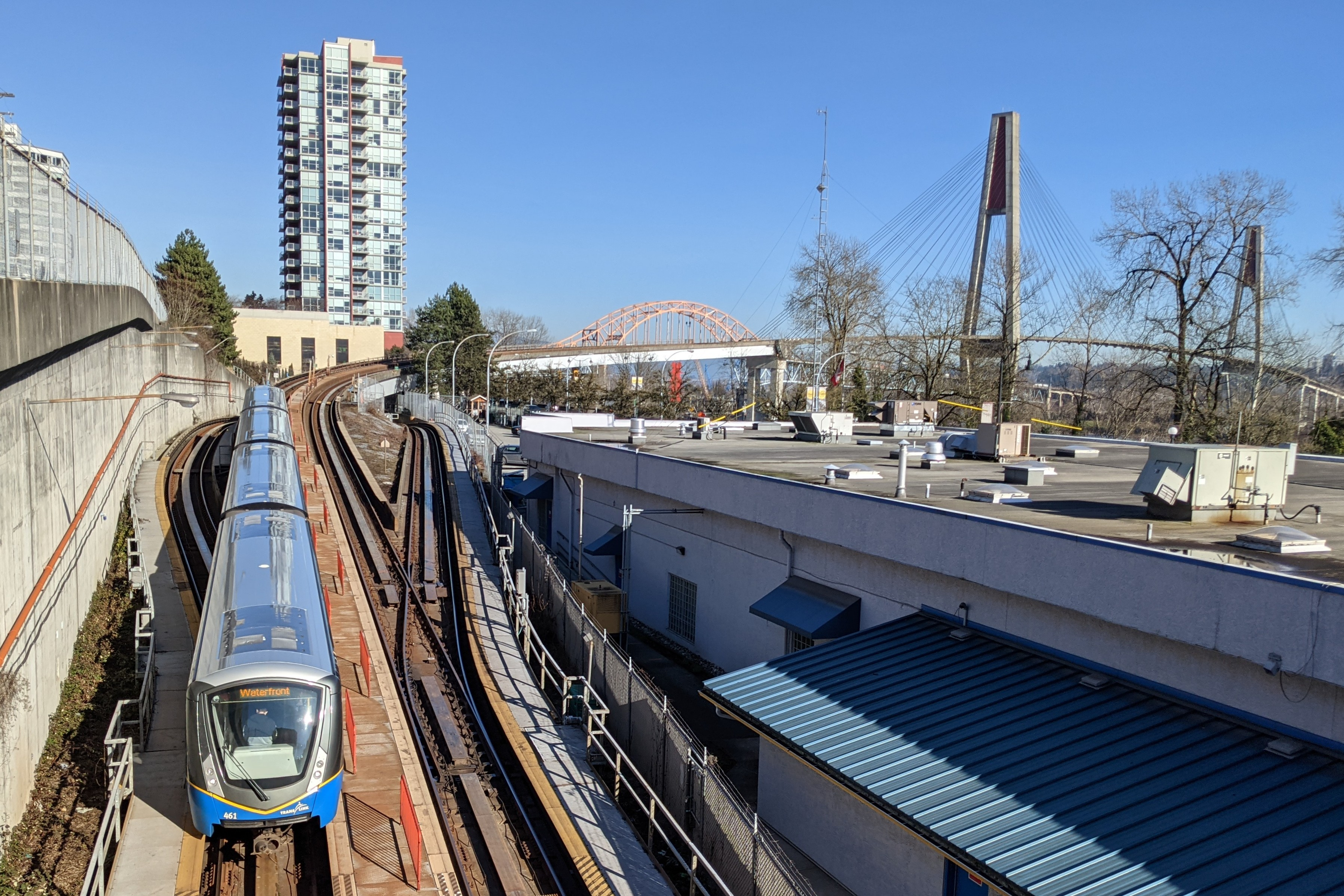
Flying junction just east of Columbia station in New Westminster in Canada

- Columbia station in New Westminster, BC – Expo Line branches for King George (top) and Production Way–University (bottom)
- Bridgeport station in Richmond, BC – Canada Line branches for YVR–Airport and Richmond–Brighouse
- Bois-Franc station in Montreal, QC – Réseau express métropolitain branches for Anse-à-l'Orme and Deux-Montagnes

Denmark

- Hvidovre, Copenhagen (55.664158°N 12.483701°E)
- Junction of M1 and M2 lines on the Copenhagen Metro
- Lunderskov (55.473772°N 9.301164°E)
- Roskilde, south of (55.607374°N 12.046496°E)
- Sydhavnen, Copenhagen (55.641273°N 12.548343°E)
- Vigerslev, Copenhagen (55.657331°N 12.505050°E)

Finland

- Railway junction of two main lines at Kytömaa, Kerava
- Huopalahti railway station, Helsinki

France (LGV Triangles)

- Triangle de Fretin, Lille, connecting Paris, Brussels and London
- Triangle de Coubert, Paris
- Triangle des Angles, Avignon, with two parallel 1.5-kilometre (0.93 mi) viaducts
- Triangle de Claye-Souilly, Paris, partial four-way junction
- Triangle de Vémars, Paris

Germany

- Bruchsal Rollenberg junction

Hong Kong

- Where Airport Express and Tung Chung line diverge from each other at Tai Ho Wan
- Tseung Kwan O line to the east of Tseung Kwan O station

Japan

- Amagasaki Station – Hanshin Line trains heading to Ōsaka Namba or Umeda
- Chiba Station – Chiba Monorail trains for Kenchō-mae or Chishirodai
- Futamata-gawa Station – Sotetsu Line trains bound for Ebina or Shonandai
- Imba Nihon-idai Station – for Hokusō trains headed to Narita Airport or to Imba railway depot
- Nishi-Funabashi Station – Musashino line branches for Tokyo or Kaihimmakuhari
- Nishikujō Station – tracks for the Osaka Loop Line and the Sakurajima Line
- Okayama Station – for services on the Seto Ohashi Line needing to cross over the San'yo Main Line
- Ōmiya Station – tracks for the Jōetsu Shinkansen and the Tōhoku Shinkansen
- Sagami-Ōno Station – for Odakyu trains headed to Odawara or Katase-Enoshima
- Shin-Yurigaoka Station – for Odakyu trains headed to Karakida or Odawara
- Takasaki Station – tracks for the Hokuriku Shinkansen and the Tōhoku Shinkansen
- Tennōji Station – tracks for the Hanwa Line cross over the Osaka Loop Line

Additionally, a dive-under junction exists in Narita utilizing infrastructure of the abandoned Narita Shinkansen project which serves the Keisei Narita Airport Line and the Airport Branch of the JR Narita Line. While the two tracks to not interact with each other owing to a difference in track gauge, services continue east on a single corridor to serve Narita Airport.

Netherlands

Flying junctions flank both ends of Weesp railway station

There are between 25 and about 40 flying junctions on Dutch railways, depending on how more complex examples are counted.

- Near Harmelen. Before conversion to a flying junction, this was the site of the Harmelen train disaster.
- At Breukelen railway station
- At Lage Zwaluwe railway station

Flying junctions where the merged lines become a four track railway:

- Near Den Haag Laan van NOI railway station
- North of Leiden where lines from Haarlem and Schiphol merge
- At Boxtel railway station where lines from 's-Hertogenbosch and Tilburg merge
- West of Gouda where lines from Rotterdam and The Hague merge

More complex flying junctions, with tracks from four directions joining:

- Around Amsterdam Sloterdijk railway station
- Around Duivendrecht railway station
- Northwest exit of Utrecht Centraal railway station
- West and northwest exit of Rotterdam Centraal railway station
- At both sides of Weesp railway station (see diagram at right)

New Zealand

- North of Wellington railway station where the North Island Main Trunk and the Wairarapa line diverge

Norway

- Lillestrøm (59.952571°N 11.027455°E)
- Lysaker (59.914903°N 10.627711°E)
- Sandvika, east of and west of (59.896373°N 10.536113°E) (59.890663°N 10.508148°E)

South Korea

- Iksan station – the Jeolla line splits from the Honam high speed railway south of the station
- Osong station – the Honam high speed railway splits from the Gyeongbu high speed railway south of the station

Sweden

- Flemingsberg (59.214247°N 17.939363°E)
- Järna, north of (59.121566°N 17.613176°E)
- Järna, south of (59.071478°N 17.539807°E)
- Lund (55.712348°N 13.185570°E)
- Hyllie (55.558971°N 12.961761°E)
- Myrbacken (59.678161°N 17.826828°E)
- Lernacken (55.562779°N 12.931545°E)
- Södertälje hamn (59.181793°N 17.643503°E)
- Södertälje syd (59.159427°N 17.637278°E)
- Tomteboda (59.352646°N 18.015546°E)

Taiwan

- Start of Shalun line, south of Zhongzhou railway station

United Kingdom

- Pelaw Junction where both the Tyne and Wear Metro green line to South Hylton joins the Durham Coast Line and yellow line continues to South Shields – both diverging on the bridge itself
- Springhead Junction on the North Kent Line
- Southfleet Junction on the HS1
- Norton Bridge Junction near Stone, Staffordshire
- Hamilton Square underground station, Birkenhead, on Merseyrail
- Aynho Junction in Aynho, Northamptonshire
- Worting Junction near Basingstoke, Hampshire (the flyover is called Battledown Flyover)
- Cogload Junction near Taunton
- Weaver Junction near Dutton, Cheshire
- Shortlands Junction in south London
- Northwest of Harrow-on-the-Hill, in the north London suburbs
- Hitchin flyover, Hertfordshire.
- Werrington Junction dive-under, northern suburbs of Peterborough, Cambridgeshire
- Reading West Junction
- Bleach Green Viaducts & Junction, Whiteabbey, Northern Ireland
- Manchester Metrolink, Greater Manchester, immediately southwest of Cornbrook tram stop where the Eccles Line diverges from the Altrincham Line.
- Heaton Lodge Junction near Mirfield, West Yorkshire

United States

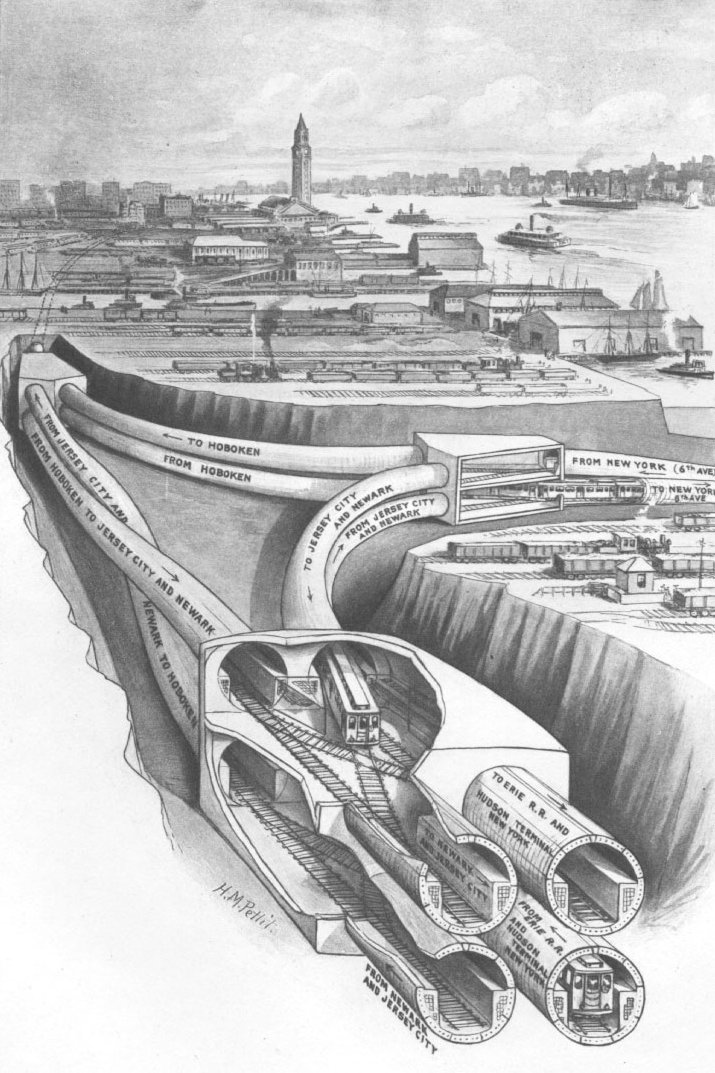
The Uptown Hudson Tubes in Jersey City, New Jersey were built c. 1910.

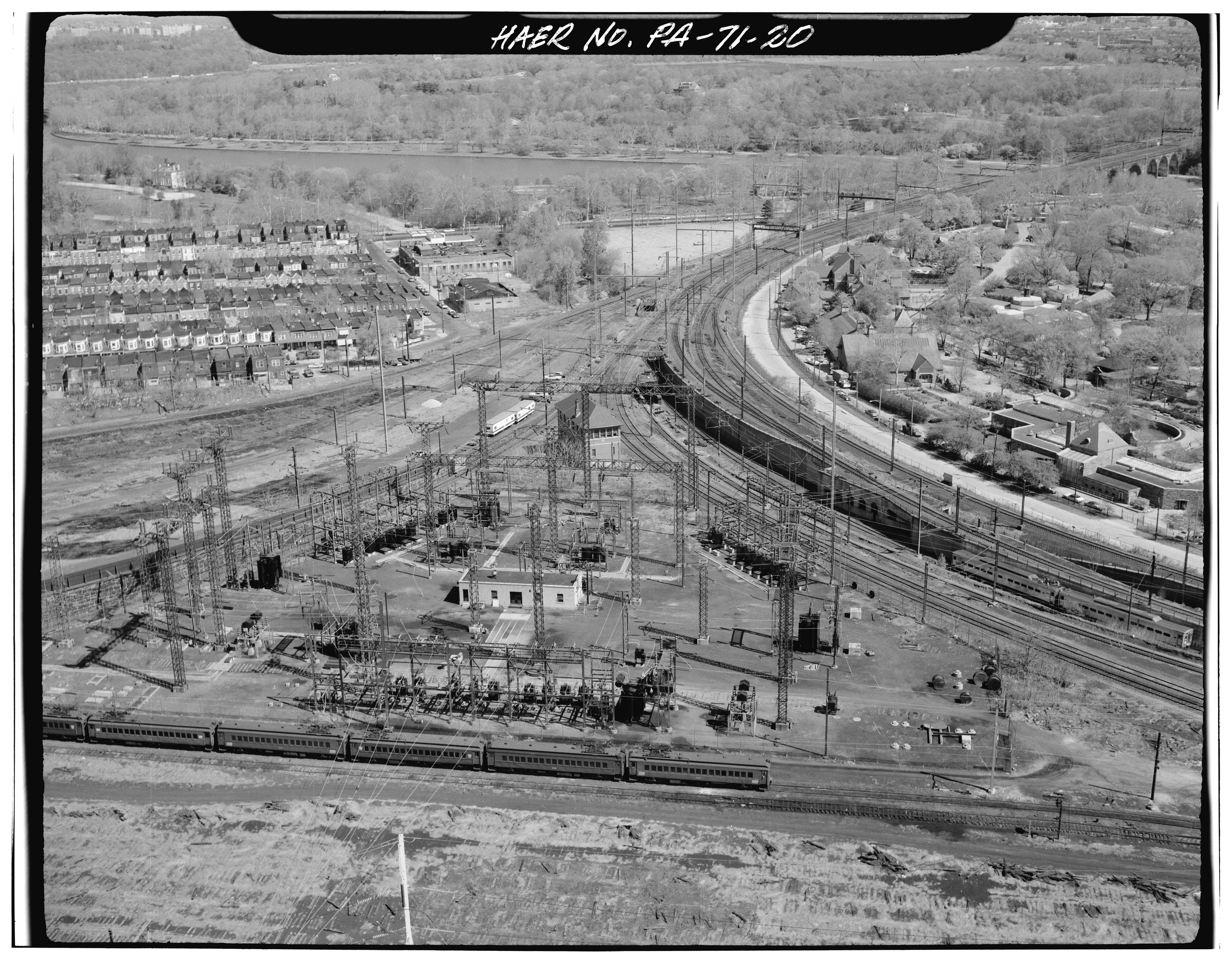
Zoo Junction in Philadelphia in 1977

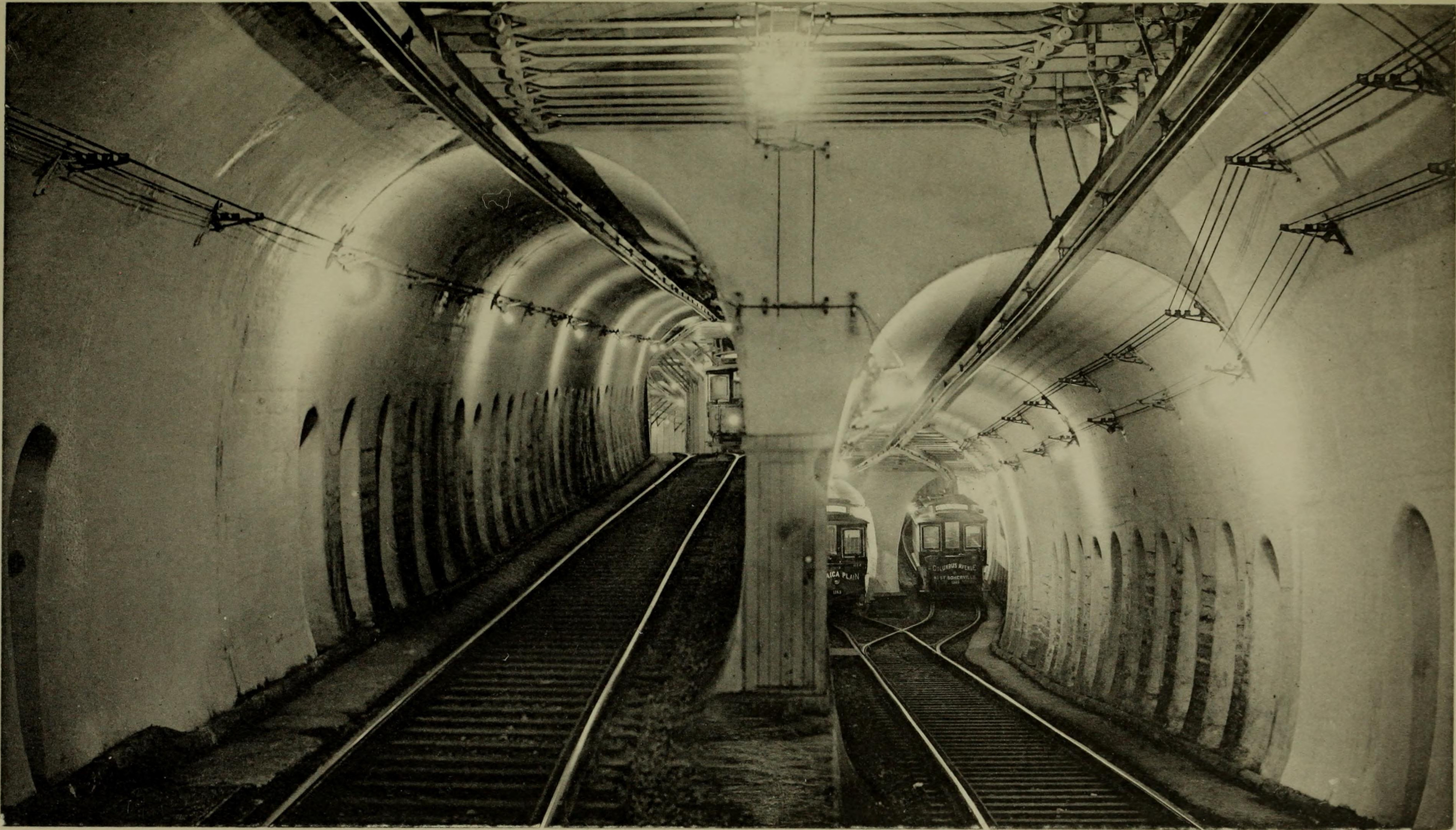
Flying junction on the Tremont Street subway approaching the Pleasant Street incline in Boston

- Northeast U.S. (Amtrak)
  - Along the New York–Washington section of the Northeast Corridor, and on the Philadelphia–Harrisburg section of the Keystone Corridor. Both converge at Zoo Junction near 30th Street Station in Philadelphia. All were built by the former Pennsylvania Railroad and are now maintained by Amtrak.
- Boston, Massachusetts area
  - An abandoned underground junction on the Tremont Street subway approaching the Pleasant Street incline
  - The B branch splits off from the C and D branches of the MBTA Green Line via an underground flying junction just west of Kenmore station.
  - The Union Square spur splits off from the Green Line Extension of the MBTA Green Line via an aerial flying junction on the Red Bridge viaduct in the Inner Belt area of Somerville, Massachusetts just north of Lechmere station in Cambridge. Lead tracks to the GLX maintenance facility also split off from the junction slightly further west.
  - The two southern branches of the MBTA Red Line in Boston split via a flying junction just north of JFK/UMass station. In addition, lead tracks to Cabot Yard maintenance facilities branch off from the junction.
- Chicago, Illinois
  - On the Chicago "L", where Orange Line trains diverge from Green Line trains north of 18th Street, as well as underground where a non-revenue flying junction separates Red Line trains heading to 95th from those heading to the South Side main line, which is occasionally used for emergency reroutes to Ashland/63rd.
  - The Milwaukee–Dearborn subway (now part of the Blue Line) was constructed to have a flying junction where turning between Lake Street and Milwaukee Avenue at Canal Street. The outbound tunnel and its stub, designed to continue west under Lake Street, was bored at less depth than the inbound tunnel and its Lake Street stub, in order to allow future Lake Street trains (now part of the Green and (Pink Lines) to run under or over the opposing Milwaukee Avenue trains while entering or exiting the shared portion of the Lake Street tunnels. Plans in 1939 called for tunnels to replace the elevated Lake Street tracks east of approximately Racine Avenue. By 1962, the planned Lake Street tunnels to/from Racine Avenue would have curved south to Randolph Street and bypassed the Milwaukee-Lake-Dearborn tunnel entirely.
  - A flying junction immediately north of Belmont/Sheffield is used by Brown Line trains to access the Ravenswood Branch while avoiding crossing the Red Line and Purple Line Express tracks.
- Denver, Colorado
  - On the Regional Transportation District in Denver between the Southeast Corridor and the I-225 Corridor: the Southeast Corridor is on the west side of I-25 and the I-225 Corridor is in the median of I-225. The grade separations of the junction are woven into the grade separations of the interchange between the two highways.
- Kansas City, Missouri/Kansas City, Kansas
  - The Santa Fe Junction connects the Kansas City Terminal Railway, BNSF Southern Transcon and Argentine Yard, and UP Armourdale Yard with multiple flyovers.
- New York, New York
  - On the New York City Subway there is an above-ground example at Hammel's Wye on the IND Rockaway Line, as well as numerous below-ground examples across the network
  - Connecting Metro-North Railroad's New Haven Line and Harlem Line, near Wakefield station in the Bronx
- Philadelphia, Pennsylvania
  - Amtrak's Zoo Junction, where the Northeast Corridor meets the Keystone Corridor and sorts into 30th Street Station's lower and upper level platforms. Also known as Zoo Interlocking, the name comes from the Philadelphia Zoo, which is located in the crescent shaped pocket between the junction and the river.
  - On SEPTA's Cynwyd Line, diverging from the Keystone Corridor west of 52nd Street.
  - On SEPTA Airport Line, diverging from the Northeast Corridor south of Penn Medicine Station
  - On SEPTA's subway–surface trolley lines, where the Route 10 diverges from Routes 11/13/34/36 west of 33rd Street.
  - On SEPTA's Broad Street subway, where Broad-Ridge Spur trains diverge at Fairmount. There are also provisions for flying junctions north of Erie for the Roosevelt Boulevard Subway, and north of Olney for an extension on North Broad Street; both are maintained as layup tracks.
- San Francisco Bay Area, California
  - The Oakland Wye, where all of Bay Area Rapid Transit's mainline operations converge near downtown Oakland
  - On the Market Street subway in San Francisco where the J Church and N Judah lines join the main line of the subway. The subway portal is east of the intersection of Church Street and Duboce Avenue in the Duboce Triangle neighborhood, immediately north of a Safeway supermarket and south of the San Francisco branch of the United States Mint.
- Washington, District of Columbia
  - All main-line connections on the Washington Metro – adjacent to the Pepco power plant on Benning Road (near the Stadium-Armory station) is a large three-track structure with a turnback pocket where the Blue, Silver and Orange Lines meet. This would have been part of the Oklahoma Avenue station, had it been built. South of the King Street station in Alexandria is a series of tunnels where the Blue and Yellow Lines meet. There are also flying junctions near three underground rail stations: Rosslyn (Blue, Silver, and Orange Lines), L'Enfant Plaza (Green and Yellow lines), and the Pentagon (Blue and Yellow lines).

== See also ==
- Double junction
- Interchange (road)
