= Chiba-kōen Station =

Monorail station in Chiba, Japan

CM04 Chibakōen Station 千葉公園駅
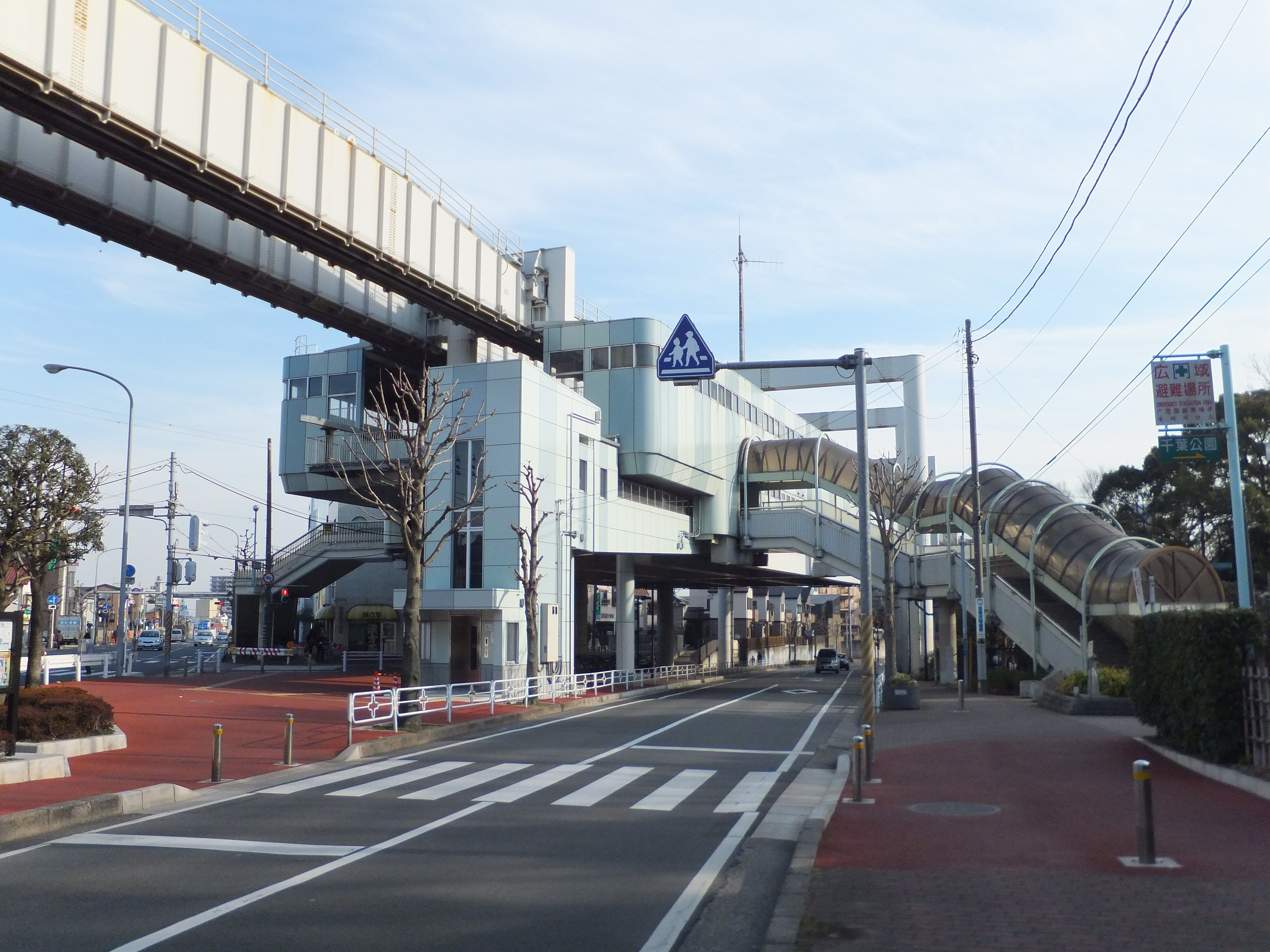
- Chibakōen Station in February 2012

General information
- Location: 3 Benten, Chūō-ku, Chiba-shi, Chiba-ken; Japan
- Coordinates: 35.6199°N 140.1180°E
- Operator: Chiba Urban Monorail
- Line: Chiba Urban Monorail Line 2
- Platforms: 2 side platforms
- Tracks: 2

History
- Opened: 12 June 1991

Passengers
- FY2009: 698 daily

Services
| Preceding station | Chiba Urban Monorail | Following station |
|---|---|---|
| Chiba CM03 Terminus | Line 2 | Sakusabe CM05 towards Chishirodai |
Location
- Location within Chiba Prefecture Location within Japan

Chibakōen Station (千葉公園駅, Chibakōen-eki) is a monorail station on the Chiba Urban Monorail in Chūō-ku in the city of Chiba, Chiba Prefecture, Japan. It is located 1.1 kilometers from the northern terminus of the line at Chiba Station.

== Lines ==
- Chiba Urban Monorail Line 2

== Layout ==
Chibakōen Station is an elevated station with two opposed side platforms serving two tracks.

=== Platforms ===
| 1 | ■ Chiba Urban Monorail Line 2 | for Tsuga and Chishirodai |
| 2 | ■ Chiba Urban Monorail Line 2 | for Chiba and Chiba-Minato |

== History ==
Chibakōen Station opened on June 12, 1991.

== See also ==
- List of railway stations in Japan
