= Anagawa Station (Chiba) =

Monorail station in Chiba, Japan

CM07 Anagawa Station 穴川駅
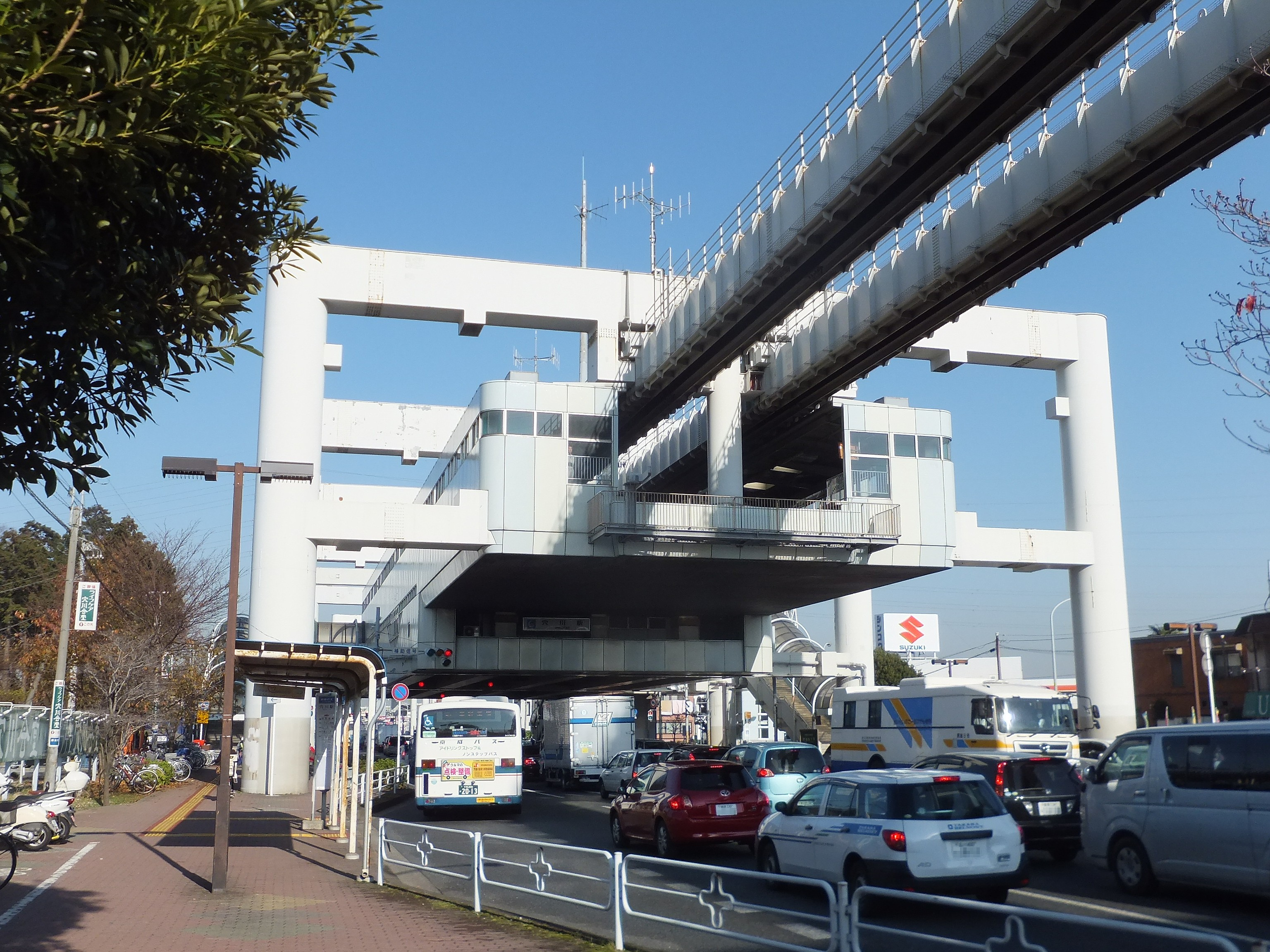
- Anagawa Station in December 2011

General information
- Location: 79-1 Anagawa-cho, Inage-ku, Chiba-shi, Chiba-ken; Japan
- Coordinates: 35°38′22.84″N 140°06′43.28″E
- Operator: Chiba Urban Monorail
- Line: Chiba Urban Monorail Line 2

History
- Opened: 12 June 1991

Passengers
- FY2009: 1,393 daily

Services
Preceding station	Chiba Urban Monorail	Following station
Tendai CM06 towards Chiba	Line 2	Sports Center CM08 towards Chishirodai
Location
- Location within Chiba Prefecture Location within Japan

Anagawa Station (穴川駅, Anagawa-eki) is a monorail station on the Chiba Urban Monorail located in Inage-ku in the city of Chiba, Chiba Prefecture, Japan. It is located 3.4 kilometers from the northern terminus of the line at Chiba Station.

== Lines ==
- Chiba Urban Monorail Line 2

== Layout ==
Anagawa Station is an elevated station with two opposed side platforms serving two tracks.

=== Platforms ===
1	■ Chiba Urban Monorail Line 2	for Tsuga and Chishirodai
2	■ Chiba Urban Monorail Line 2	for Chiba and Chiba-Minato

== History ==
Anagawa Station opened on June 12, 1991.

== See also ==
- List of railway stations in Japan
