= Chishirodai-Kita Station =

Monorail station in Chiba, Japan

Coordinates: 35.6272°N 140.1819°E

CM14 Chishirodai-Kita Station 千城台北駅
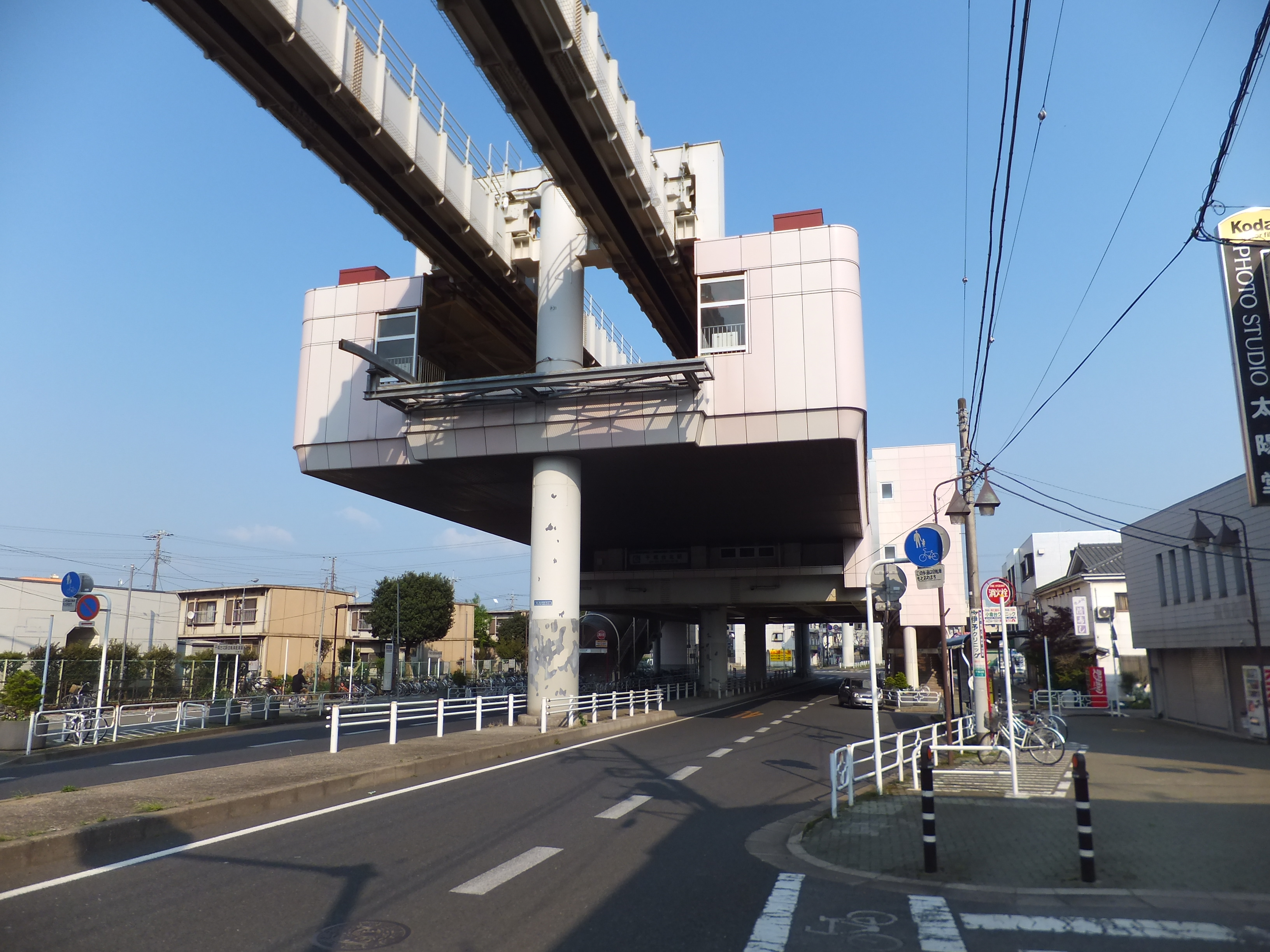
- Chishirodai-Kita Station (May 6, 2012)

General information
- Location: 1-2-2 Chishirodai-Kita, Wakaba-ku, Chiba, Chiba Prefecture; Japan
- Operator: Chiba Urban Monorail
- Line: Chiba Urban Monorail Line 2

History
- Opened: 1988

Passengers
- 2009: 808 daily

Services
Preceding station	Chiba Urban Monorail	Following station
Oguradai CM13 towards Chiba	Line 2	Chishirodai CM15 Terminus
Location
- Location within Chiba Prefecture Location within Japan

Chishirodai-Kita Station (千城台北駅, Chishirodai-Kita-eki) is a monorail station on the Chiba Urban Monorail located in Wakaba-ku in the city of Chiba, Chiba Prefecture, Japan. It is located 11.2 kilometres (7.0 mi) from the northern terminus of the line at Chiba Station.

== Lines ==
Chiba Urban Monorail Line 2

== Layout ==
Chishirodai-Kita Station is an elevated station with two opposed side platforms serving two tracks.

=== Platforms ===
1	■ Chiba Urban Monorail Line 2	for Chishirodai
2	■ Chiba Urban Monorail Line 2	for Tsuga, Chiba, and Chiba-Minato

== History ==
Chishirodai Station opened on March 28, 1988.
