= Sports Center Station (Chiba) =

Monorail station in Chiba, Japan

CM08 Sports Center Station スポーツセンター駅
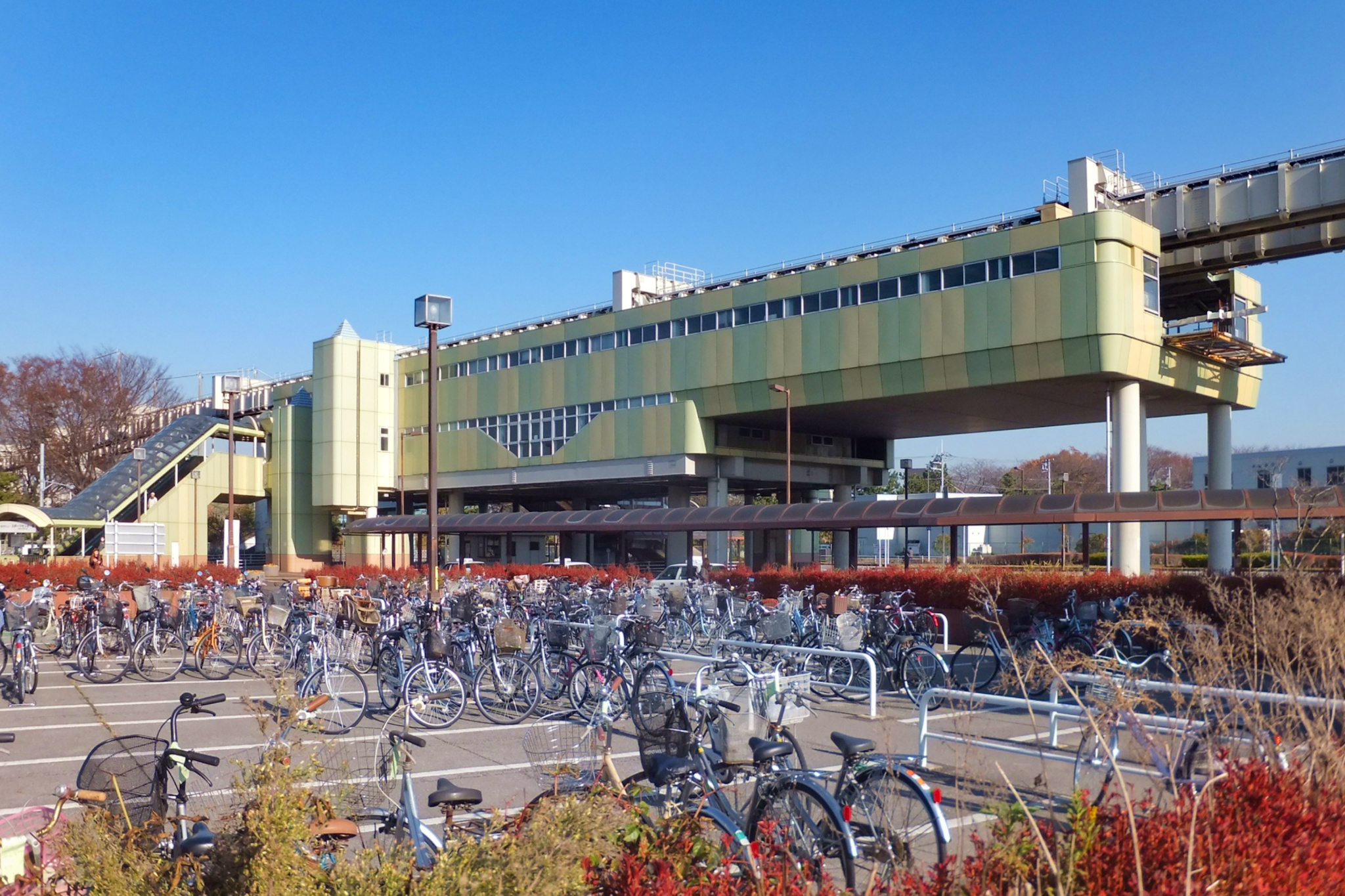
- Sports Center Station in December 2011

General information
- Location: 6-12-6 Tendai, Inage-ku, Chiba-shi, Chiba-ken; Japan
- Coordinates: 35.6430°N 140.1160°E
- Operator: Chiba Urban Monorail
- Line: Chiba Urban Monorail Line 2

History
- Opened: 28 March 1988

Passengers
- FY2009: 2,409 daily

Services
Preceding station	Chiba Urban Monorail	Following station
Anagawa CM07 towards Chiba	Line 2	Dōbutsukōen CM09 towards Chishirodai
Location
- Location within Chiba Prefecture Location within Japan

Sports Center Station (スポーツセンター駅, Supōtsu-Senta-eki) is a monorail station on the Chiba Urban Monorail located in Inage-ku in the city of Chiba, Chiba Prefecture, Japan. It is located 4.0 kilometers from the northern terminus of the line at Chiba Station.

It contains two baseball fields, tennis courts and a full running track.

== Lines ==
- Chiba Urban Monorail Line 2

== Layout ==
Sports Center Station is an elevated station with two opposed side platforms serving two tracks.

=== Platforms ===
1	■ Chiba Urban Monorail Line 2	for Tsuga and Chishirodai
2	■ Chiba Urban Monorail Line 2	for Chiba and Chiba-Minato

== History ==
Sports Center Station was opened on March 28, 1988.

== See also ==
- List of railway stations in Japan
