= Yoshikawa-kōen Station =

Monorail station in Chiba, Japan

CM17 Yoshikawa-kōen Station 葭川公園駅
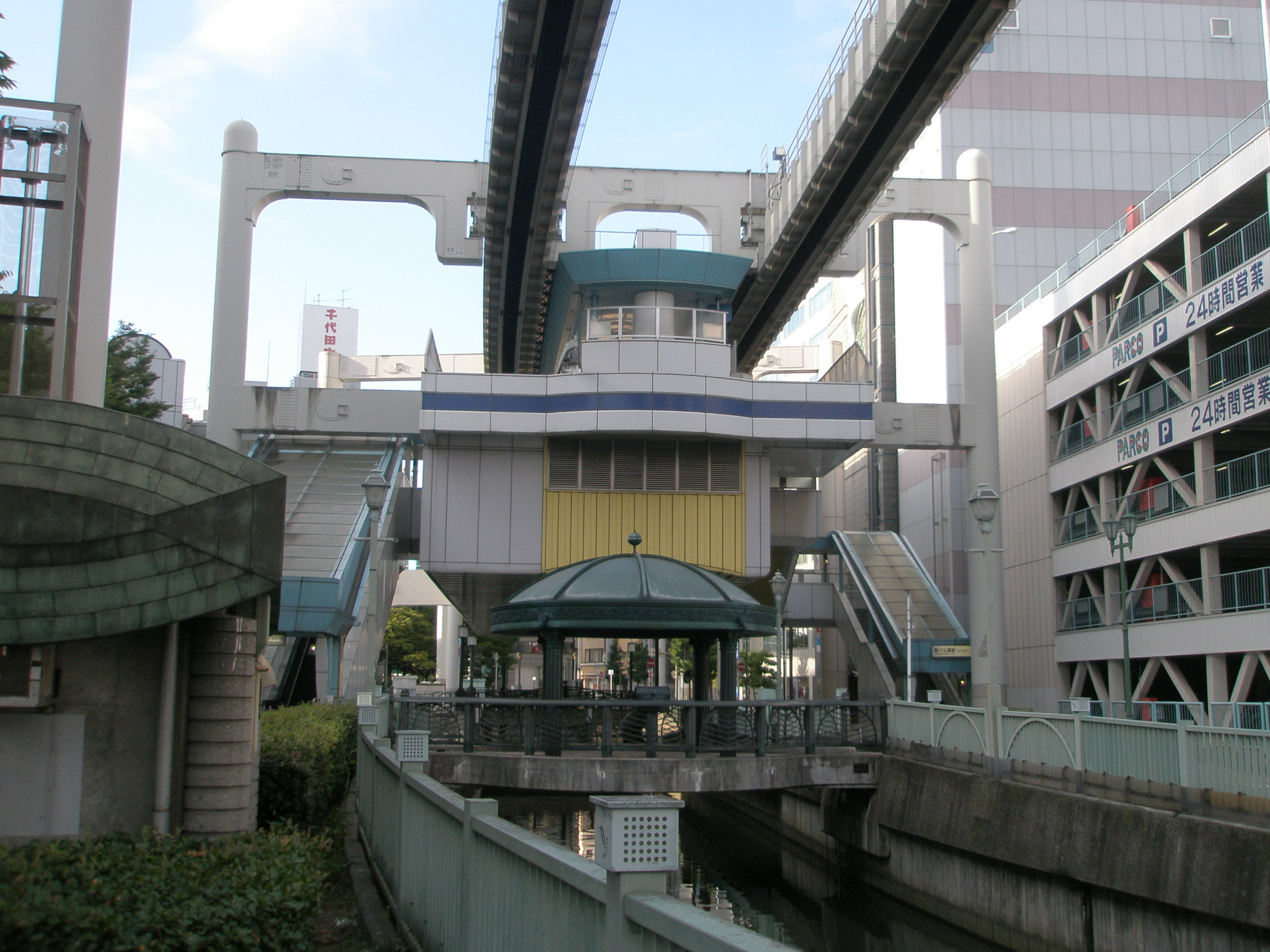
- Yoshikawa-kōen Station in August 2008

General information
- Location: 2-1 Chūō, Chūō-ku, Chiba-shi, Chiba-ken; Japan
- Coordinates: 35.6086°N 140.1200°E
- Operator: Chiba Urban Monorail
- Line: Chiba Urban Monorail Line 1
- Platforms: 1 island platform
- Tracks: 2

History
- Opened: 24 March 1999

Passengers
- FY2009: 746 daily

Services
| Preceding station | Chiba Urban Monorail | Following station |
|---|---|---|
| Sakaechō CM16 towards Chiba-Minato | Line 1 | Kenchō-mae CM18 Terminus |
Location
- Location within Chiba Prefecture Location within Japan

Yoshikawa-kōen Station (葭川公園駅, Yoshikawa-kōen-eki) is a monorail station on the Chiba Urban Monorail in Chūō-ku in the city of Chiba, Chiba Prefecture, Japan. It is located 2.5 kilometers from the terminus at Chiba Station.

== Lines ==
- Chiba Urban Monorail Line 1

== Station layout ==
Yoshikawa-kōen Station is an elevated station with one island platform serving two tracks.

=== Platforms ===
| 1 | ■ Chiba Urban Monorail Line 1 | for Kenchō-mae |
| 2 | ■ Chiba Urban Monorail Line 1 | for Chiba and Chiba-Minato |

== History ==
Yoshikawa-kōen Station opened on March 24, 1999.

== See also ==
- List of railway stations in Japan
