= Inage-ku =

Inage 稲毛区
- Ward
- Inage Ward
- Flag Seal

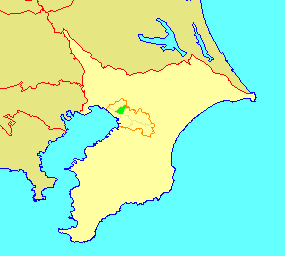
- Location of Inage in Chiba

- Coordinates: 35°38′11″N 140°06′26″E
- Country: Japan
- Region: Kantō
- Prefecture: Chiba
- City: Chiba

Area
  - Total: 21.25 km^{2} (8.20 sq mi)

Population (April 2012)
  - Total: 156,860
  - Density: 7,380/km^{2} (19,100/sq mi)
- Time zone: UTC+9 (Japan Standard Time)
- Address: 4-12-1 Anagawa, Inage-ku Chiba-shi, Chiba-ken; 263-8733
- Website: Official website of Inage-ku

Inage Ward within Chiba

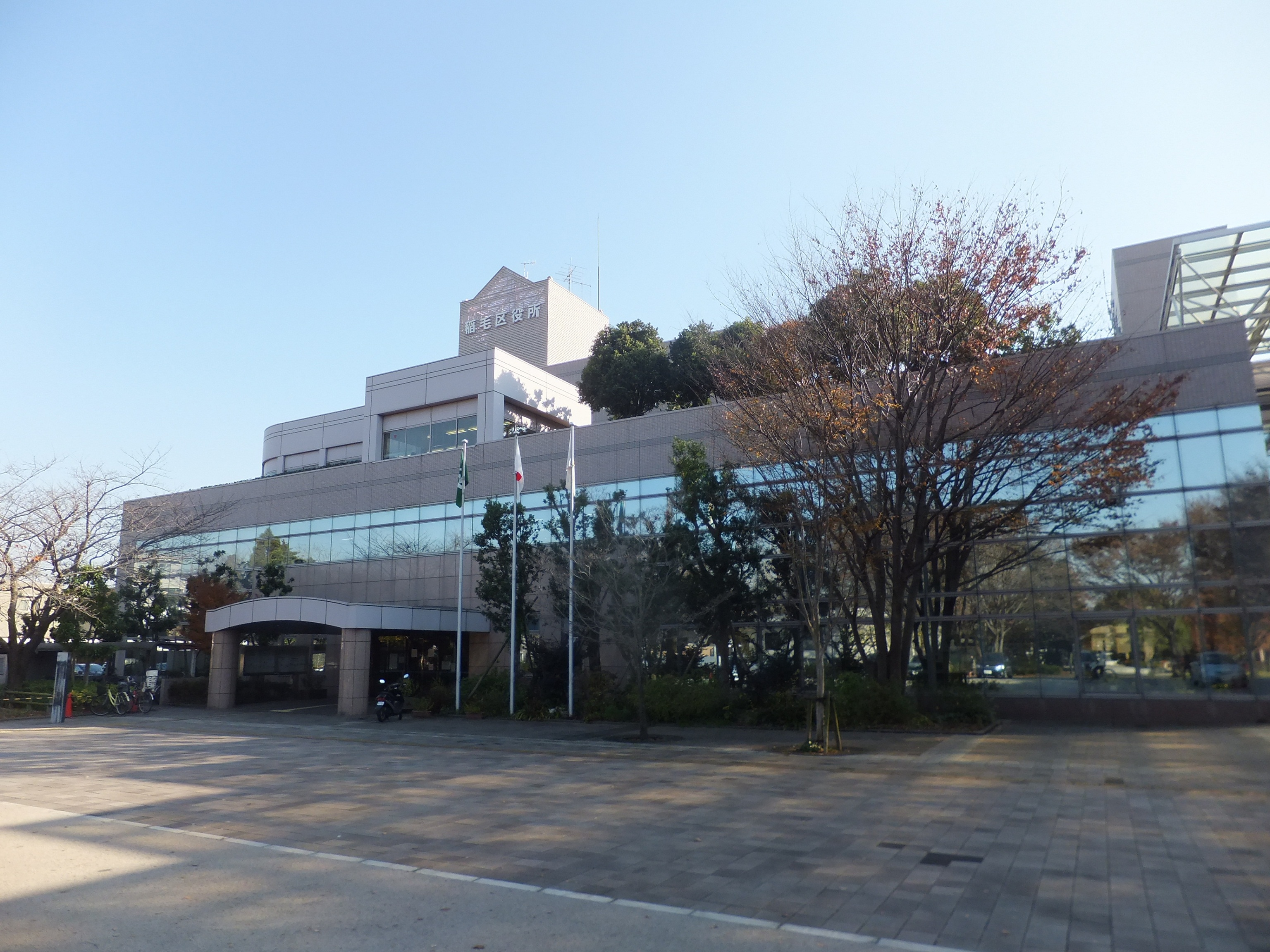
Inage Ward Office (Dec 15, 2011)

Inage Ward (稲毛区, Inage-ku) is one of the six wards of the city of Chiba in Chiba Prefecture, Japan. As of April 2012, the ward had an estimated population of 156,860 and a population density of 7,380 persons per km^{2}. The total area was 21.25 square kilometres (8.20 mi^{2}).

== Geography ==
Inage Ward is located in an inland area of northwest Chiba City. The ward is a flat, highly urbanized area of mixed industry and housing.

=== Surrounding municipalities ===
- Wakaba Ward
- Chuo-ku Ward
- Mihama Ward
- Hanamigawa Ward
- Yotsukaidō, Chiba

== History ==
The area of present-day Inage Ward was settled since ancient times. The Inage Sengen Shrine dates to the 9th century. In modern times. Inage was composed of the villages of Tsuga, Kemigawa, Kotegawa and a portion of the town of Chiba in 1889. Kemigawa became a town in 1891. Chiba became a city in 1921. Chiba annexed Tsuga Village and Kemigawa Town in 1937, and Kotegawa in 1954. Inage historically faced Tokyo Bay, and given its proximity to Tokyo, was a popular tourist destination for swimming and clamming. Numerous beach huts were constructed along the Tokyo Bay coast. The ward became landlocked by 1961 after the extensive land reclamation projects were completed along the coast of Tokyo Bay in Chiba Prefecture. As part of the development of Chiba City, numerous planned residential districts were built in Inage after World War II due to the development of the JR East Sōbu and Keisei Chiba lines. The construction of planned housing complexes continues in the ward. With the promotion of Chiba to a designated city, the city gained additional autonomy from the Chiba Prefecture and the central government. Accordingly, on April 1, 1992, Inage Ward was established as an administrative unit.

== Economy ==
Inage Ward is largely a regional commercial center and bedroom community for central Chiba and Tokyo. In the northern part of the ward is Nairiku Industrial Park (内陸工業団地, Nairiku kōgyōdanchi).

== Transportation ==
=== Rail ===
- JR East – Sōbu Line
  - Inage - Nishi-Chiba
- JR East – Chiba Line
  - Keisei Inage - Midoridai
- Chiba Urban Monorail – Line 2
  - Sakusabe - Tendai - Anagawa -Sports Center

=== Highways ===
- Higashi-Kantō Expressway
- Keiyō Road
- Japan National Route 14
- Japan National Route 16
- Japan National Route 126

=== Buses ===
The following public buses are available in Inage-ku

- Keisei Bus
- Chiba Nairiku Bus
- Chiba City Bus
- Chiba Kaihin Kotsu
- Asuka Kotsu
- Heiwa Kotsu

== Education ==
Inage-ku is home to the main campus of Chiba University. Additionally, Keiai University and Chiba Keizai University are also located in the ward.

Municipal elementary and junior high schools are operated by the Chiba City Board of Education (千葉市教育委員会).

Municipal junior high schools:

- Chigusadai (千草台中学校)
- Inage (稲毛中学校)
- Konakadai (小中台中学校)
- Kusano (草野中学校)
- Midorimachi (緑町中学校)
- Todorokicho (轟町中学校)
- Tsuga (都賀中学校)

Municipal elementary schools:

- Ayamedai (あやめ台小学校)
- Chigusadai (千草台小学校)
- Chigusadai Higashi (千草台東小学校)
- Inagaoka (稲丘小学校)
- Inage (稲毛小学校)
- Kashiwadai (柏台小学校)
- Konakadai (小中台小学校)
- Konakadai Minami (小中台南小学校)
- Kusano (草野小学校)
- Midorimachi (緑町小学校)
- Miyanogi (宮野木小学校)
- Sanno (山王小学校)
- Sonno (園生小学校)
- Todorokicho (轟町小学校)
- Tsuga (都賀小学校)
- Yayoi (弥生小学校)

== Festival ==
The festival of the Inage Sengen Shrine is held annually on July 15. Its kagura, a type of Shinto theatrical dance, is designated a Chiba Prefectural Intangible Treasure.

== Noted people from Inage Ward ==
- Ryo Kawashima, professional baseball player
- Satoru Yamagishi – professional soccer player
- Koki Yonekura – professional soccer player
- Yasushi Kanda – professional wrestler
