= Shiyakusho-mae Station (Chiba) =

Monorail station in Chiba, Japan

CM02 Shiyakusho-mae Station 市役所前駅
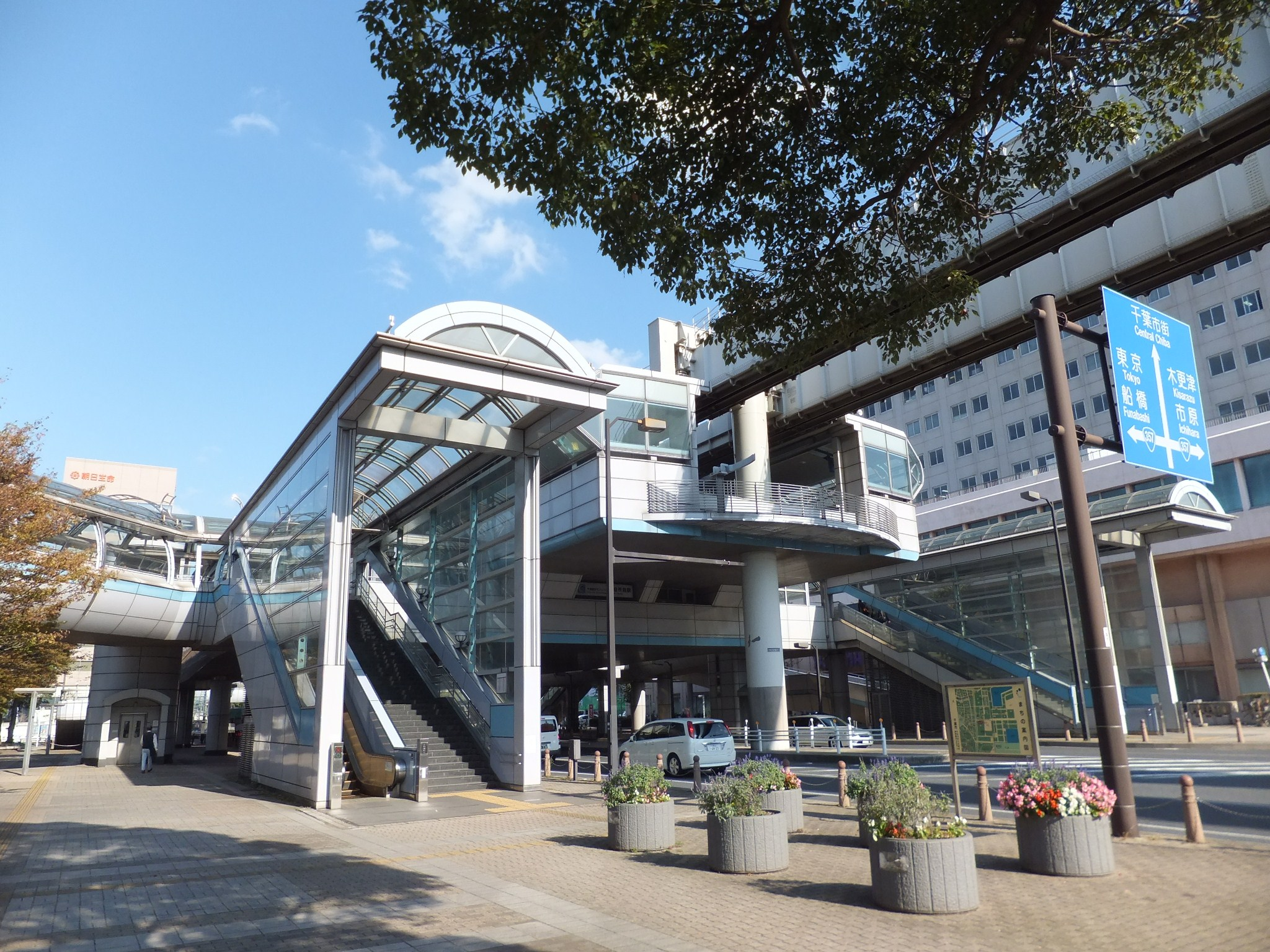
- Shiyakusho-mae Station in October 2011

General information
- Location: Chiba-minato, Chūō-ku, Chiba-shi, Chiba-ken; Japan
- Coordinates: 35°36′25.8732″N 140°6′28.07″E
- Operator: Chiba Urban Monorail
- Line: Chiba Urban Monorail Line 1
- Platforms: 2 side platforms
- Tracks: 2

History
- Opened: 1 August 1995

Passengers
- FY2009: 2,013 daily

Services
Preceding station	Chiba Urban Monorail	Following station
Chiba-Minato CM01 Terminus	Line 1	Chiba CM03 towards Kenchō-mae
Location
- Location within Chiba Prefecture Location within Japan

Shiyakusho-mae Station (市役所前駅, Shiyakusho-mae-eki) is a monorail station on the Chiba Urban Monorail in Chūō-ku in the city of Chiba, Chiba Prefecture, Japan. It is located 0.7 kilometers from the terminus of the line at Chiba Station.

== Lines ==
- Chiba Urban Monorail Line 1

== Station layout ==
Shiyakusho-mae Station is an elevated station with two opposed side platforms serving two tracks.

=== Platforms ===
1	■ Chiba Urban Monorail Line 1	for Chiba, Kenchō-mae, and Chishirodai
2	■ Chiba Urban Monorail Line 1	for Chiba-Minato

== History ==
Shiyakusho-mae Station opened on August 1, 1995.

== See also ==
- List of railway stations in Japan
