= Anagawa Station =

Anagawa Station (穴川駅) is the name of two train stations in Japan:

- Anagawa Station (Chiba)
- Anagawa Station (Mie)
