= Kenchō-mae Station (Chiba) =

Monorail station in Chiba, Japan

CM18 Kenchō-mae Station 県庁前駅
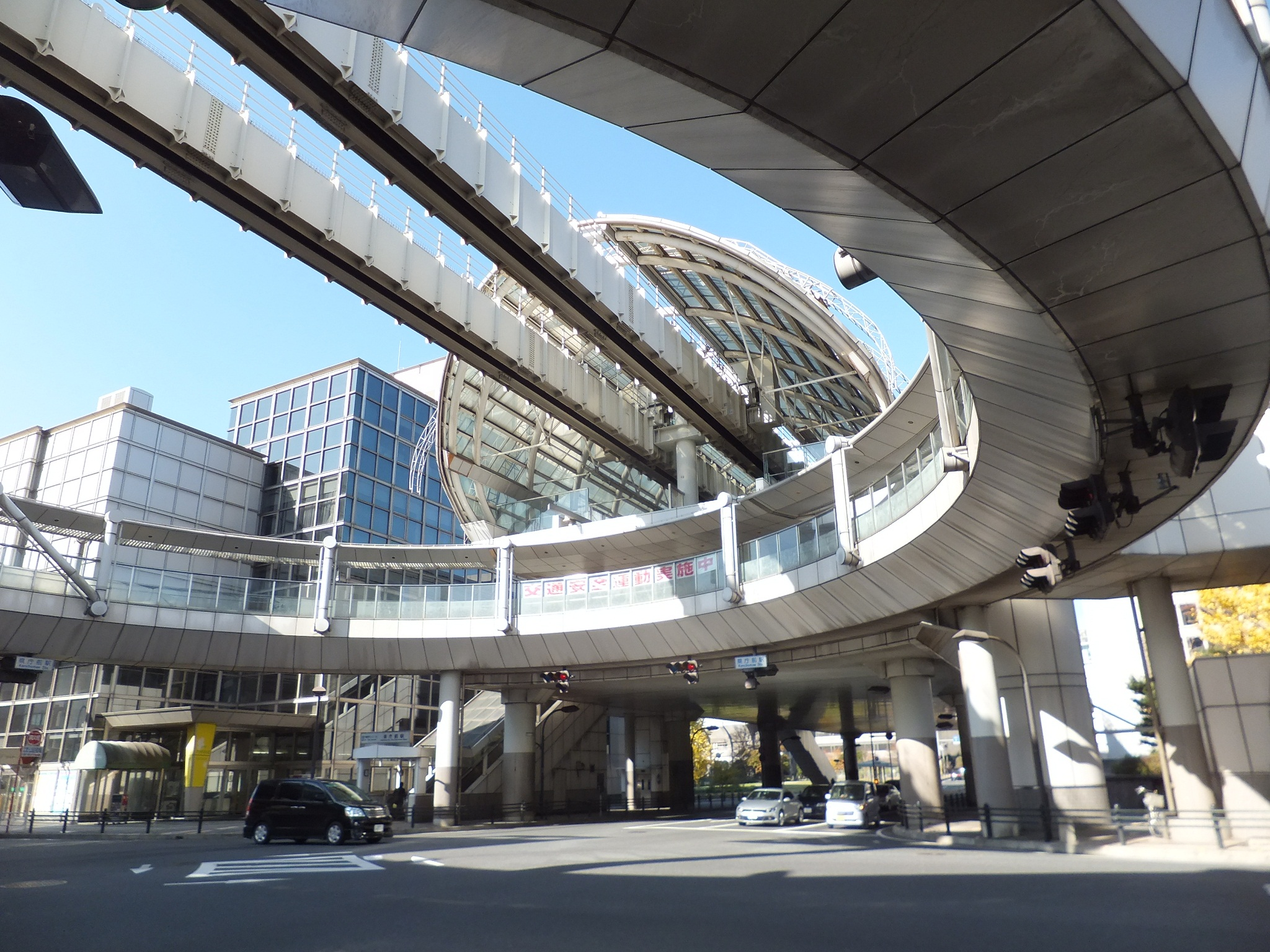
- Kenchō-mae Station in December 2011

General information
- Location: 1-2 Ichiba-cho, Chūō-ku, Chiba-shi, Chiba-ken; Japan
- Coordinates: 35°36′13.1759″N 140°7′19.8162″E
- Operator: Chiba Urban Monorail
- Line: Chiba Urban Monorail Line 1
- Platforms: 2 side platforms
- Tracks: 2

History
- Opened: 24 March 1999

Passengers
- FY2009: 877 daily

Services
Preceding station	Chiba Urban Monorail	Following station
Yoshikawa-kōen CM17 towards Chiba-Minato	Line 1	Terminus
Location
- Location within Chiba Prefecture Location within Japan

Kenchō-mae Station (県庁前駅, Kenchō-mae-eki) is a monorail station on the Chiba Urban Monorail in Chūō-ku in the city of Chiba, Chiba Prefecture, Japan. It is the terminus for Line 1 of the Chiba Urban Monorail and is located 3.2 kilometers from the opposite terminus at Chiba Station.

== Lines ==
- Chiba Urban Monorail Line 1

== Station layout ==
Kenchō-mae Station is an elevated station with two opposed side platforms serving two tracks; however, only Platform 1 is normally used.

=== Platforms ===
1	■ Chiba Urban Monorail Line 1	for Chiba and Chibaminato
2	■ Chiba Urban Monorail Line 1	(Spare)

== History ==
Kenchō-mae Station opened on March 24, 1999.

== See also ==
- List of railway stations in Japan
