= Chiba Urban Monorail =

Suspended monorail system in Chiba, Japan

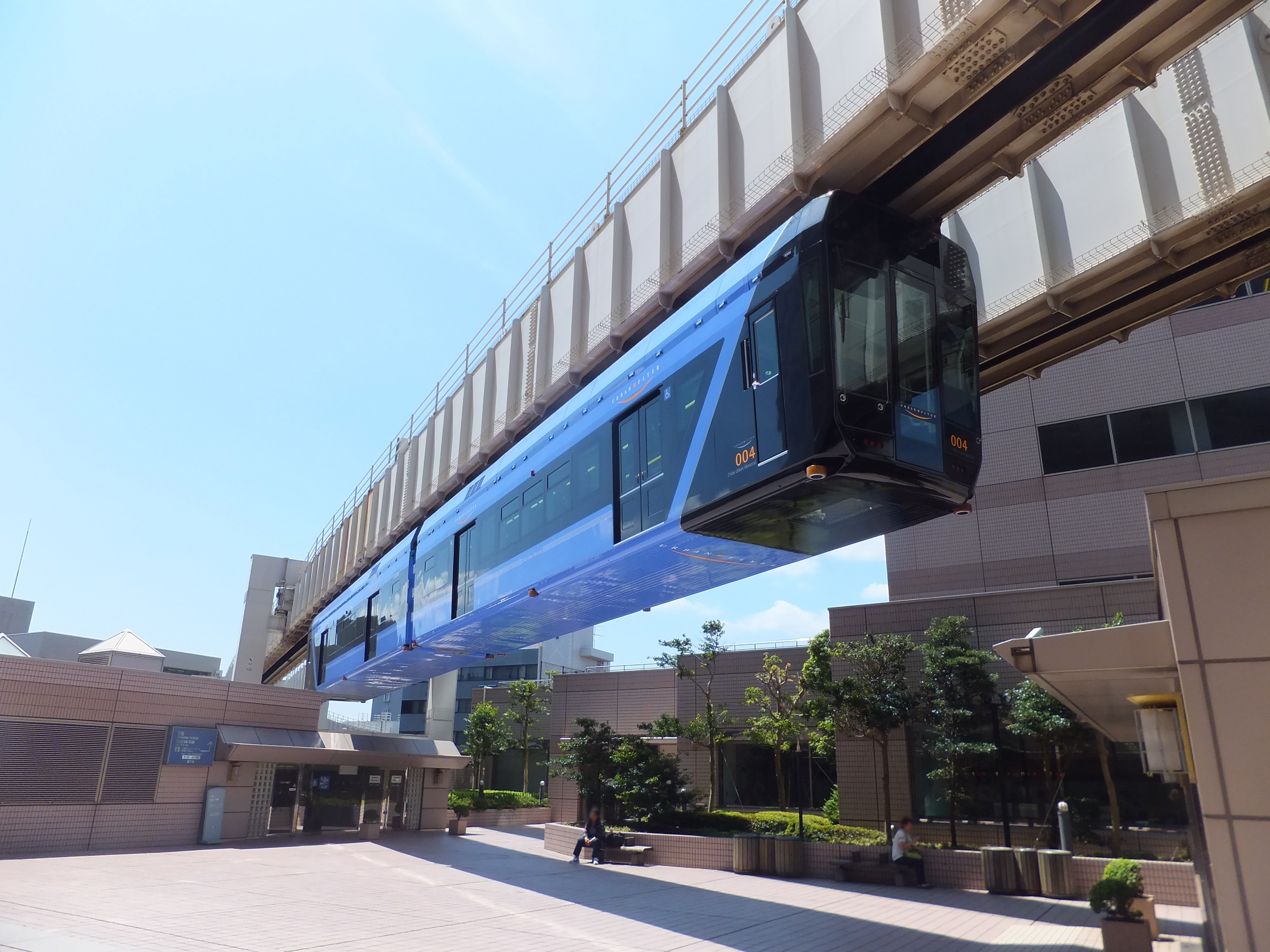
- Type 0 train approaching Chiba station

Overview
- Native name: 千葉都市モノレール
- Owner: Government of Chiba City (93%); JFE Steel (1.6%); Mitsubishi Heavy Industries (1.1%); Chiba Bank (1%); TEPCO (0.6%)
- Locale: Chiba, Japan
- Transit type: Suspension monorail (SAFEGE-type)
- Number of lines: 2
- Number of stations: 18
- Daily ridership: 52,350 (JFY23)
- Chief executive: Hirokazu Koike
- Headquarters: 199-1 Hagidai-chō, Inage-ku, Chiba
- Website: chiba-monorail.co.jp

Operation
- Began operation: March 28, 1988; 38 years ago
- Operators: Chiba Urban Monorail Co., Ltd.
- Rolling stock: 1000 series, 0 series

Technical
- System length: 15.2 km (9.4 mi)
- Electrification: Contact rails, 1,500 V DC
System map
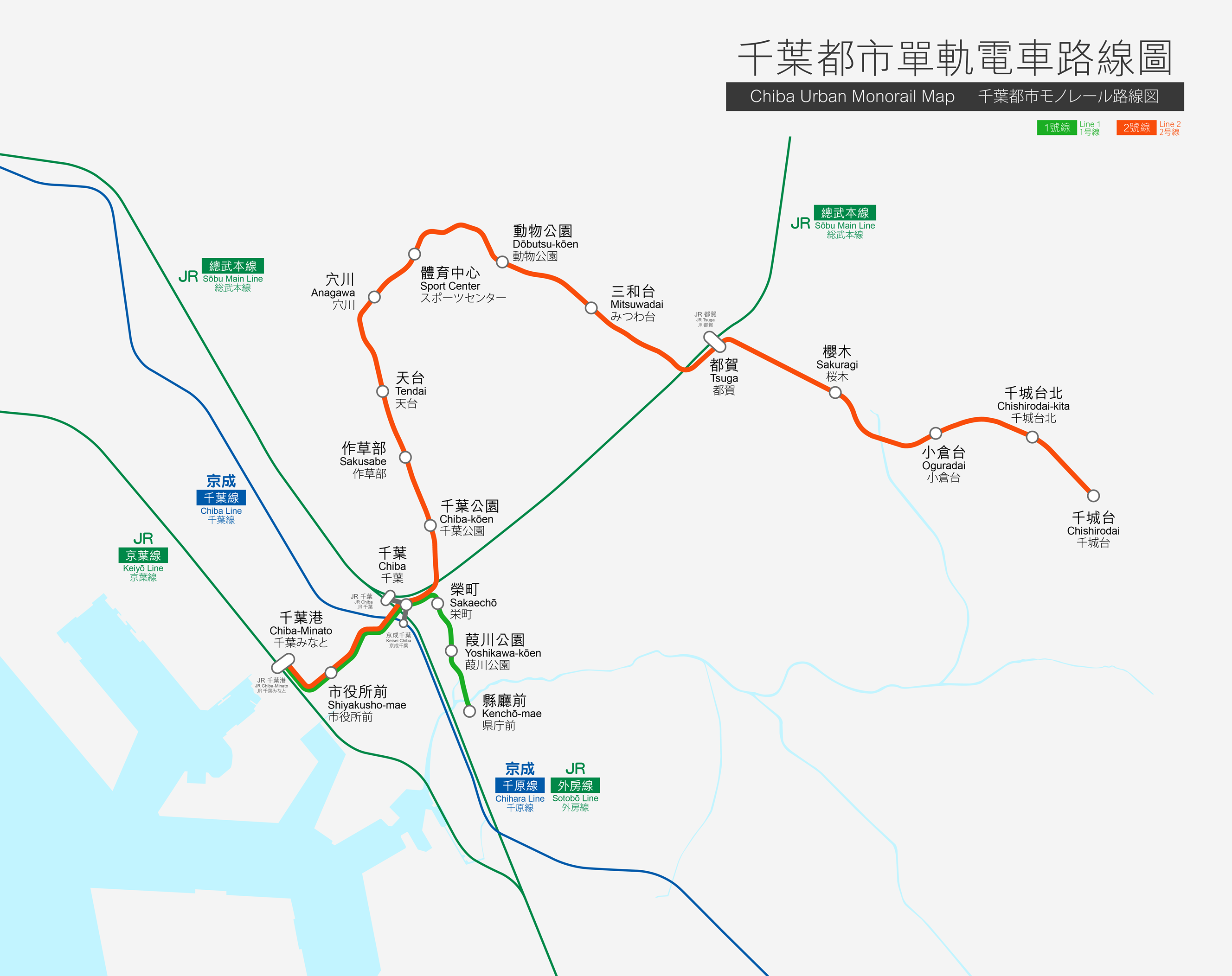

The Chiba Urban Monorail (Note: Japanese: 千葉都市モノレール, Hepburn: Chiba Toshi Monorēru) is a two-line suspended, SAFEGE-type monorail system located in Chiba, Japan. It is owned and operated by Chiba Urban Monorail Co., Ltd. (Note: 千葉都市モノレール株式会社, Chiba toshi monorēru kabushikigaisha), a third-sector company established on March 20, 1979. Investors include the city of Chiba.

The first segment (Line 2 from Sports Center Station to Chishirodai Station) opened on March 28, 1988, and the remaining segments opened by March 24, 1999. PASMO and Suica contactless smart cards can be used to purchase fares. It is one of only two systems in Japan that accepts only these cards and not other Mutual Usage IC cards.

It is the world's longest suspended monorail system, with a track length of 15.2 kilometres (9.4 mi).

== Routes ==
=== Line 1 ===
Line 1 connects Chibaminato station and Kenchō-mae station via a 3.2-kilometre (2.0 mi) multi-track route, with four intermediate stops.

==== Station list ====
No.	Station	Distance	Transfers
CM01	Chibaminato	0 km (0 mi)	Keiyō Line (JE17)
CM02	Shiyakusho-mae	0.7 km (0.43 mi)	
CM03	Chiba	1.5 km (0.93 mi)	Sōbu Main Line (JO28); Chūō-Sōbu Line (JB39); ■ Uchibō Line; ■ Sotobō Line; ■ Narita Line; Keisei Chiba Line (Keisei Chiba: KS59)
CM16	Sakaechō	2.0 km (1.2 mi)	
CM17	Yoshikawakōen	2.5 km (1.6 mi)	
CM18	Kenchō-mae	3.2 km (2.0 mi)	

=== Line 2 ===
Line 2 connects Chibaminato station and Chishirodai station via a 13.5-kilometre (8.4 mi) multi-track route, with 13 intermediate stops.

==== Station list ====
No.	Station	Distance (km)	Transfers
CM01	Chibaminato	0 km (0 mi)	Keiyō Line (JE17)
CM02	Shiyakusho-mae	0.7 km (0.43 mi)	
CM03	Chiba	1.5 km (0.93 mi)	Sōbu Main Line (JO28); Chūō-Sōbu Line (JB39); ■ Uchibō Line; ■ Sotobō Line; ■ Narita Line; Keisei Chiba Line (Keisei Chiba: KS59)
CM04	Chibakōen	2.6 km (1.6 mi)	
CM05	Sakusabe	3.3 km (2.1 mi)	
CM06	Tendai	4.0 km (2.5 mi)	
CM07	Anagawa	4.9 km (3.0 mi)	
CM08	Sports Center	5.5 km (3.4 mi)	
CM09	Dōbutsukōen	6.7 km (4.2 mi)	
CM10	Mitsuwadai	7.7 km (4.8 mi)	
CM11	Tsuga	9.2 km (5.7 mi)	Sōbu Main Line (JO28); ■ Narita Line
CM12	Sakuragi	10.5 km (6.5 mi)	
CM13	Oguradai	11.7 km (7.3 mi)	
CM14	Chishirodai-Kita	12.7 km (7.9 mi)	
CM15	Chishirodai	13.5 km (8.4 mi)	

== History ==
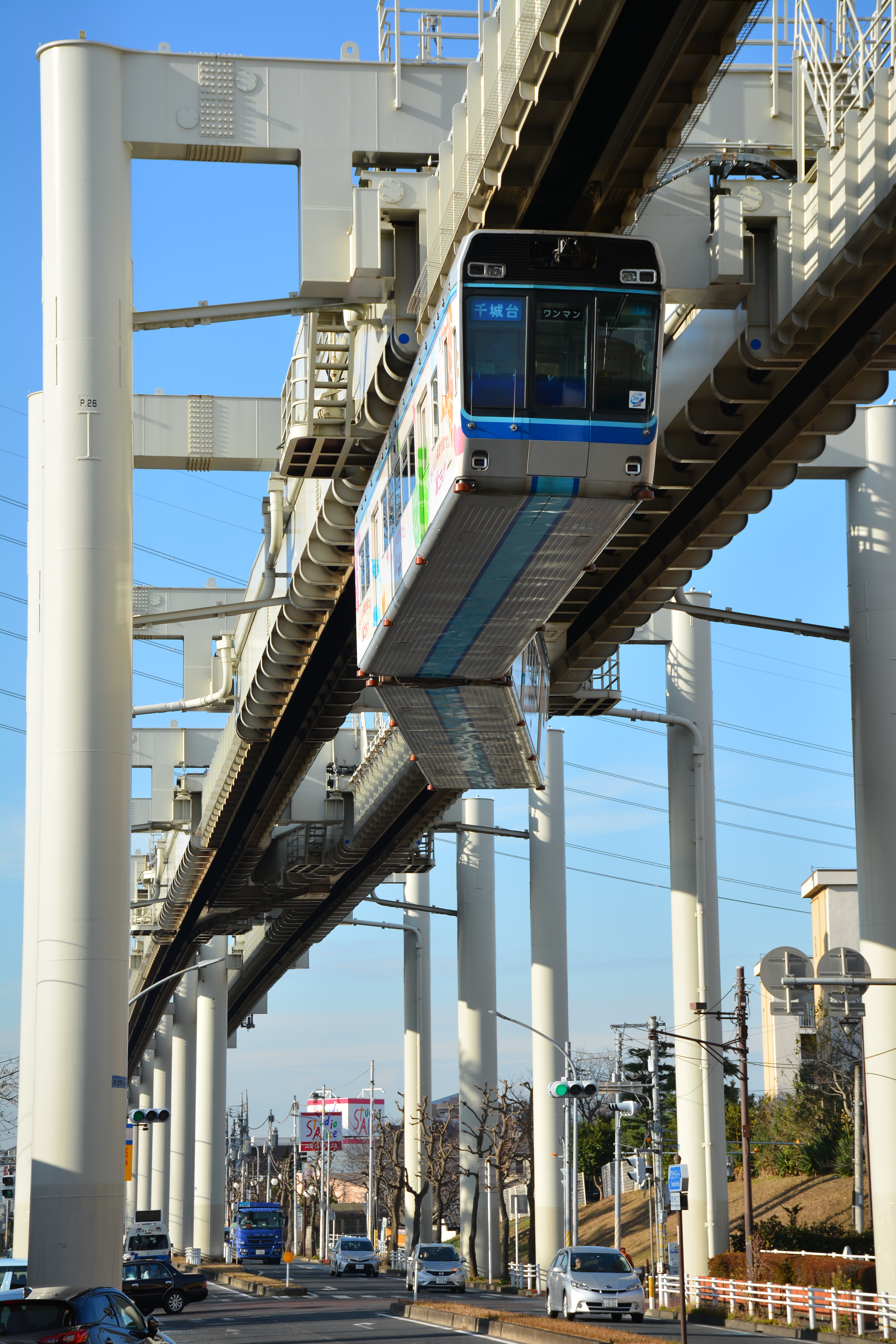
An original 1000 series train traverses a track switch near Chishirodai Station

Mitsubishi Heavy Industries successfully built and tested two suspended, SAFEGE-type monorails prior to the Chiba Urban Monorail, including the Higashiyama Park Monorail and the Shonan Monorail. The Chiba Urban Monorail was the first major installation of this type and remains the longest suspended monorail system in the world. Building upon the experience gained from the Shōnan Monorail, Mitsubishi designed and constructed the Chiba system as a dual-tracked network connecting the suburbs of Chiba Prefecture with the city's main rail station downtown. It is also the world's only dual-beamed SAFEGE-type system and includes a short spur line branching from the main route. Chiba officials selected the SAFEGE design in part because of the region's occasionally inclement weather. In a SAFEGE-type monorail, the running surfaces and train bogies are enclosed within the beam, protecting them from rain, snow, and ice.

The Chiba Urban Monorail Co., Ltd. was established on March 20, 1979. Line 2 opened between Sports Center Station and Chishirodai Station on March 28, 1988. On June 12, 1991, Line 2 was extended between Chiba Station and Sports Center Station. Line 1 between Chiba-Minato Station and Chiba Station began operation on August 1, 1995. The extension of Line 1 between Chiba Station and Kenchō-mae Station opened on March 24, 1999. At the same time, the running time on Line 2 was reduced by about 10%, and automatic ticket machines were installed at all stations.

In 2006, Chiba Prefecture withdrew its funding from the monorail project due to unsatisfactory ridership numbers. On June 21 of that year, a train collided with the arm of a crane truck working on a sewer line between Sakusabe Station and Chiba-Kōen Station on Line 2. The four-car trains in service were discontinued on March 19, 2007, and the PASMO contactless fare system was introduced on March 14, 2009.

Extensions of Line 1 had been proposed, notably a five-station, 3.4-kilometre (2.1 mi) extension from Kenchō-mae Station to Chiba Municipal Aoba Hospital. However, in 2004 an evaluation committee found that there was no need for the extension, and proposed closing the underused segment from Chiba Station to Kencho-mae Station. There was also a plan to extend the line from Anagawa Station to Inage and Inage-kaigan Station. On 4 September 2019, Chiba City announced that it had decided to discontinue plans to extend the monorail hospital route, and not to introduce a monorail on the Inage route.

The Type 0 "Urban Flyer" trains entered service on July 8, 2012. On February 20, 2019, the company announced the introduction of station numbering across the network in preparation for the 2020 Tokyo Olympic and Paralympic Games. A fire on September 9, 2020, caused by a contractor accidentally cutting a cable during substation renewal work, temporarily disrupted service on all lines. By May 31, 2021, total ridership had reached 500 million passengers.

== See also ==
- Monorails in Japan
- List of rapid transit systems
- Wuppertaler Schwebebahn
