= Tsuga Station =

Railway and monorail station in Chiba, Japan

JO30 CM11 Tsuga Station 都賀駅
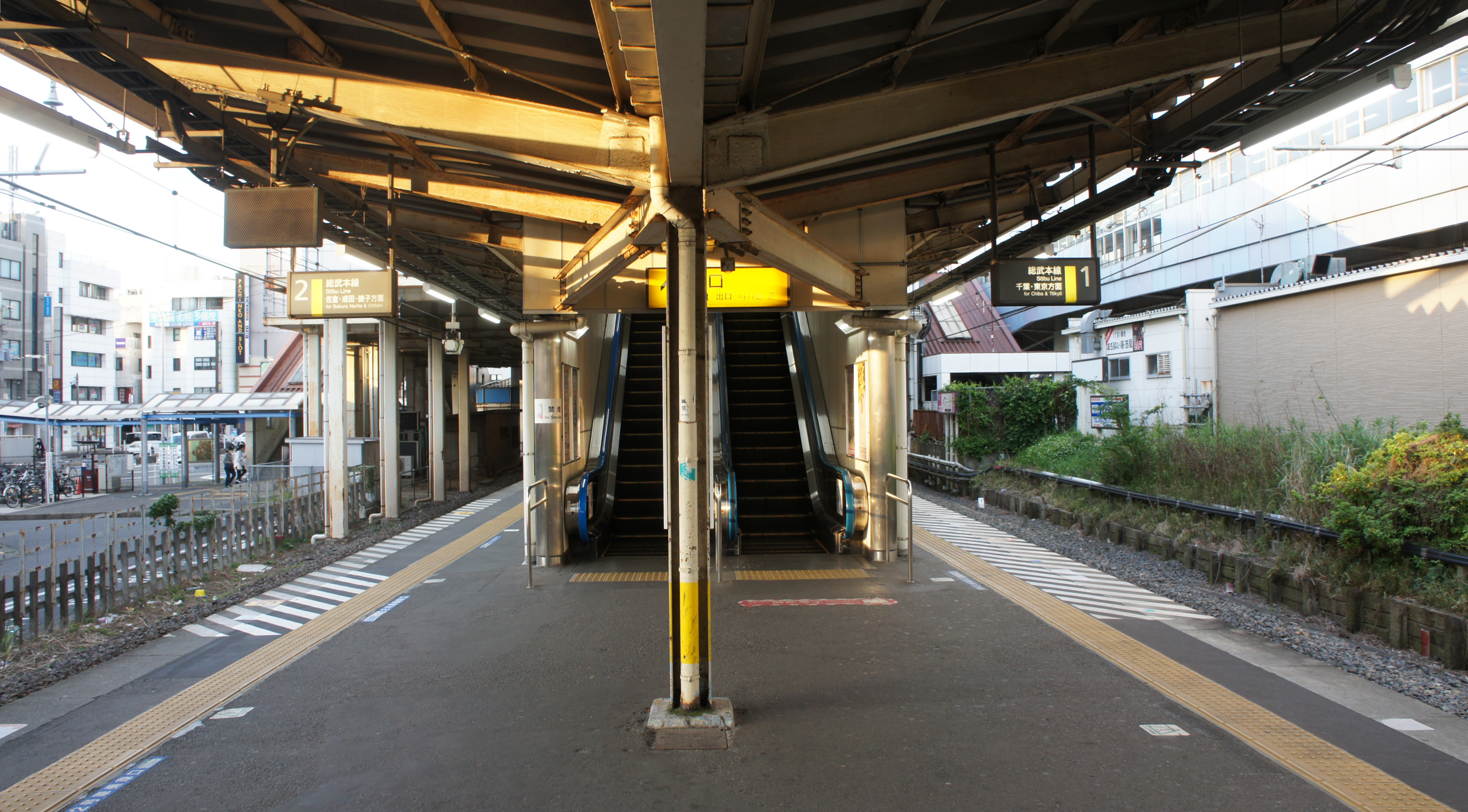
- JR East Tsuga Station platforms

General information
- Location: 2 Tsuga, Wakaba-ku, Chiba-shi, Chiba-ken 264-0025; Japan
- Coordinates: 35°38′9.9599″N 140°8′57.06″E
- Operator: JR East; Chiba Urban Monorail
- Lines: ■ Sōbu Main Line; Chiba Urban Monorail Line 2
- Distance: 43.4 km from Tokyo
- Platforms: 1 island + 2 side platforms

Other information
- Station code: JO30; CM11
- Website: Official website

History
- Opened: March 28, 1968

Passengers
- 21,084 (JR FY2019); 5,607 (Chiba Urban FY2018) daily

Services
Preceding station	JR East	Following station
Chiba JO28 Terminus	Sōbu Main / Narita lines Rapid	Yotsukaidō JO31 towards Narita Airport Terminal 1
Higashi-Chiba JO29 towards Chiba	Sōbu Main / Narita lines Local	Yotsukaidō JO31 towards Chōshi, Abiko or Narita Airport Terminal 1
Preceding station	Chiba Urban Monorail	Following station
Mitsuwadai CM10 towards Chiba	Line 2	Sakuragi CM12 towards Chishirodai
Location
- Location within Chiba Prefecture Location within Japan

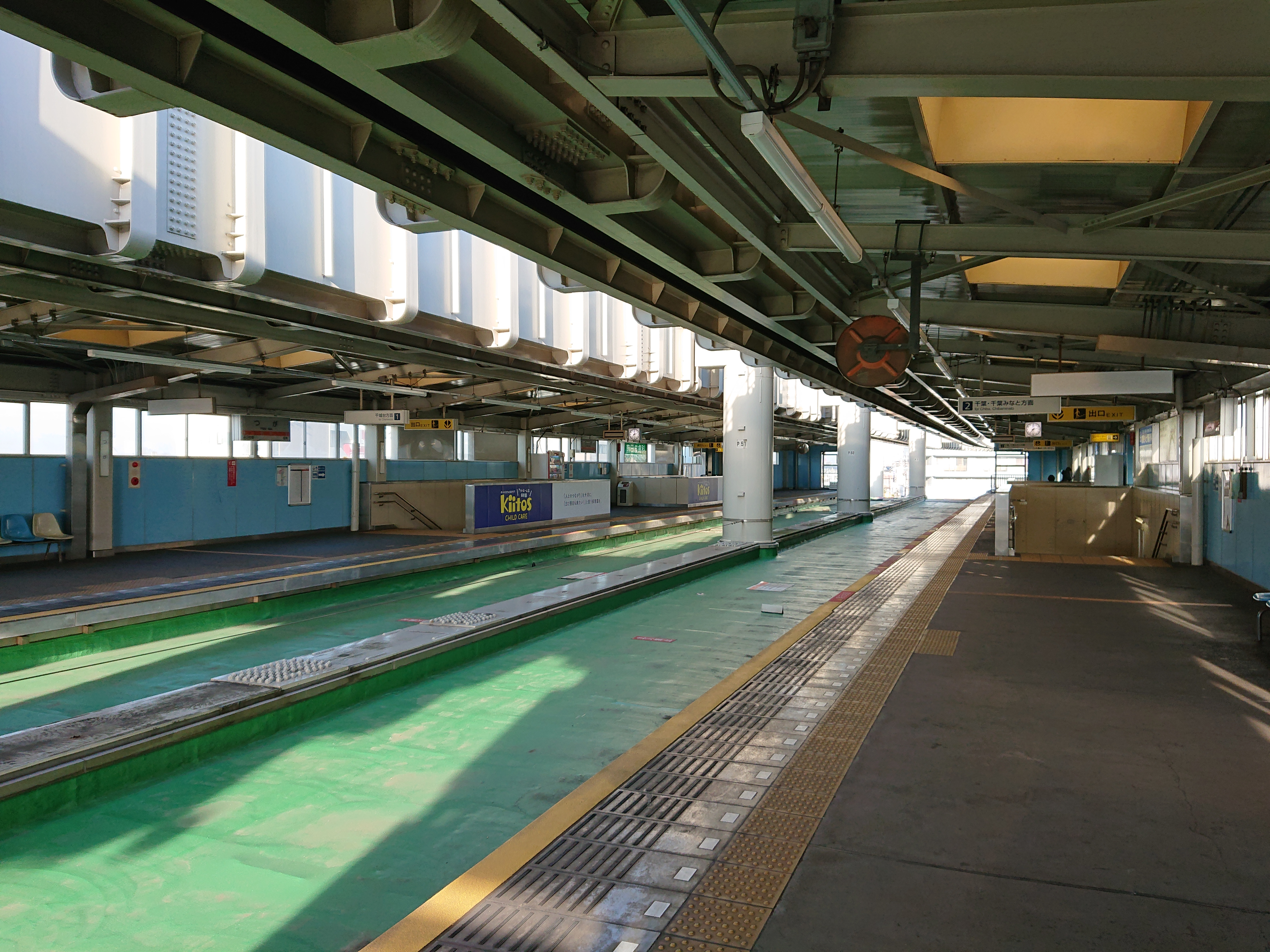
Chiba Urban Monorail Tsuga Station

Tsuga Station (都賀駅, Tsuga-eki) is an interchange passenger railway station located in Wakaba-ku, Chiba, Japan, operated by East Japan Railway Company (JR East) and the Chiba Urban Monorail.

== Lines ==
Tsuga Station is served by the Sōbu Main Line and is 43.4 kilometers from the western terminus of the line at Tokyo Station. It is also served by the Chiba Urban Monorail Line 2 and 7.7 kilometers from the terminus of that line at Chiba Station.

== Station layout ==
=== JR East ===
JR Tsuga Station has a single island platform with an elevated station building located above the tracks and platform. The station is staffed.

1	■ Sōbu Main Line	for Chiba, Tokyo, Yokohama, Ōfuna, and Kurihama
2	■ Sōbu Main Line	for Narita, Narita Airport (Narita Airport Terminal 2·3 and Narita Airport Terminal 1), Sawara, Chōshi, and Kashimajingū

=== Chiba Monorail ===
The Chiba Urban Monorail Tsuga Station is an elevated station with two opposed side platforms.

1	■ Chiba Urban Monorail	for Oguradai and Chishirodai
2	■ Chiba Urban Monorail	for Dōbutsukōen, Chiba, and Chiba-Minato

== History ==
Tsuga Station originated as the Tsuga Signal (都賀信号所) on the Japanese Government Railway (JGR), established on November 1, 1912. It was upgraded to the Tsuga Signal Stop (都賀信号場) on April 1, 1922, and to a temporary stop on September 30, 1965. After World War II, the JGR became the Japanese National Railways (JNR). Tsuga became full passenger station on March 28, 1968. The station was absorbed into the JR East network upon the privatization of JNR on April 1, 1987. The Chiba Urban Monorail began operations to the station from March 28, 2001. A new elevated station building was completed between 2002 and 2009.

== Passenger statistics ==
In fiscal 2019, the JR portion of the station was used by an average of 21,084 passengers daily In fiscal 2018, the Chiba Urban Monorail portion of the station was served by 6,041 passengers.

== Surrounding area ==
- Chiba City Wakaba Ward Office
- Tsuga Community Center
- Wakaba Health and Welfare Center

== See also ==
- List of railway stations in Japan
