= Chiba Station =

Railway and monorail station in Chiba, Japan

Coordinates: 35.613122°N 140.113192°E

JO28 JB39 CM03 Chiba Station 千葉駅
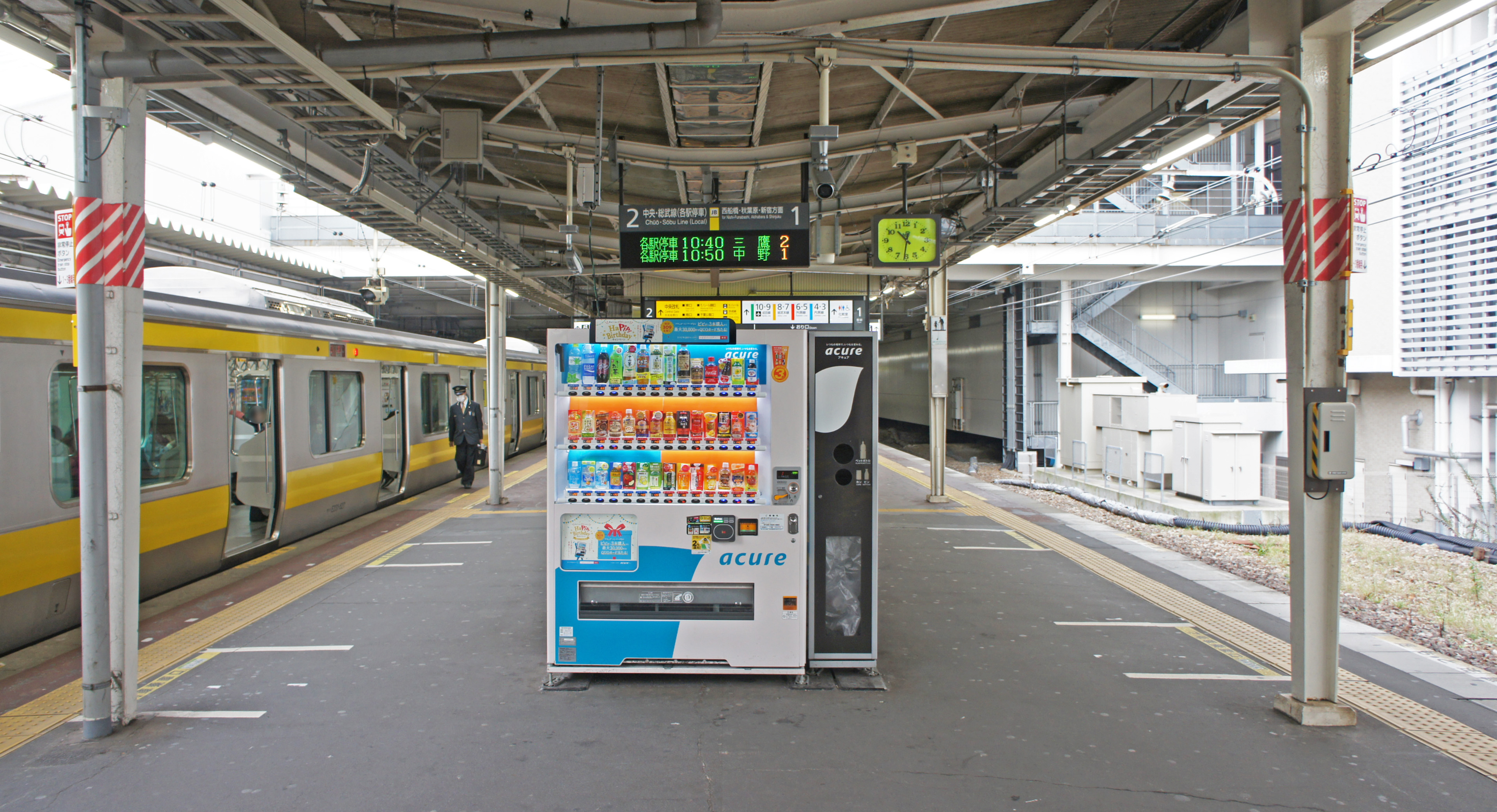
- Platform 1・2 (Sobu Local Line) of JR Chiba Station

General information
- Location: 1 Shin-Chiba, Chūō-ku, Chiba, Chiba （千葉県千葉市中央区新千葉１丁目） Japan
- Operator: JR East; Chiba Urban Monorail
- Lines: ■ Sōbu Main Line; Chūō-Sōbu Line; Sōbu Line (Rapid); ■ Narita Line; ■ Sotobō Line; ■ Uchibō Line; Chiba Urban Monorail Line 1; Chiba Urban Monorail Line 2
- Connections: KS59 Keisei Chiba Station; Bus terminal

History
- Opened: 20 July 1894; 132 years ago
Services
Preceding station	JR East	Following station
Tokyo JO19 towards Shinjuku or Ōfuna	Narita Express	Yotsukaidō JO31 (rush periods) towards Narita Airport Terminal 1
Funabashi JO25 towards Hakuba	Azusa	Terminus
Funabashi JO25 towards Ōtsuki	Fuji Excursion	Terminus
Funabashi JO25 (limited service) towards Tokyo	Shiosai	Yotsukaidō JO31 (limited service) towards Chōshi
Inage JO27 towards Tokyo	Sōbu Line Rapid	through to Sōbu Main Line, Sotobō Line and Uchibō Line
Nishi-Chiba JB38 towards Mitaka	Chūō–Sōbu Line	Terminus
through to Sōbu Line	Sōbu Main / Narita lines Rapid	Tsuga JO30 towards Narita Airport Terminal 1
Terminus	Sōbu Main / Narita lines Local	Higashi-Chiba JO29 towards Chōshi, Abiko or Narita Airport Terminal 1
through to Sōbu Line	Sotobō / Uchibō lines Sobū Rapid	Hon-Chiba towards Kazusa-Ichinomiya or Kimitsu
Terminus	Sotobō / Uchibō lines Local	Hon-Chiba towards Awa-Kamogawa
Preceding station	Chiba Urban Monorail	Following station
Shiyakusho-mae CM02 towards Chiba-Minato	Line 1	Sakaechō CM16 towards Kenchō-mae
through to Line 1	Line 2	Chibakōen CM04 towards Chishirodai
Location
- Location within Chiba Prefecture

Chiba Station (千葉駅, Chiba-eki) is a major interchange railway station in Chiba, Chiba, Japan, operated by East Japan Railway Company (JR East) and Chiba Urban Monorail.

== Lines ==
Chiba Station is served by the following lines.

=== JR East ===
- Sobu Main Line
  - Chūō-Sōbu Line
  - Sobu Line (Rapid)
- Narita Line
- Sotobo Line
- Uchibo Line

=== Chiba Urban Monorail ===
- Line 1
- Line 2

== Station layout ==
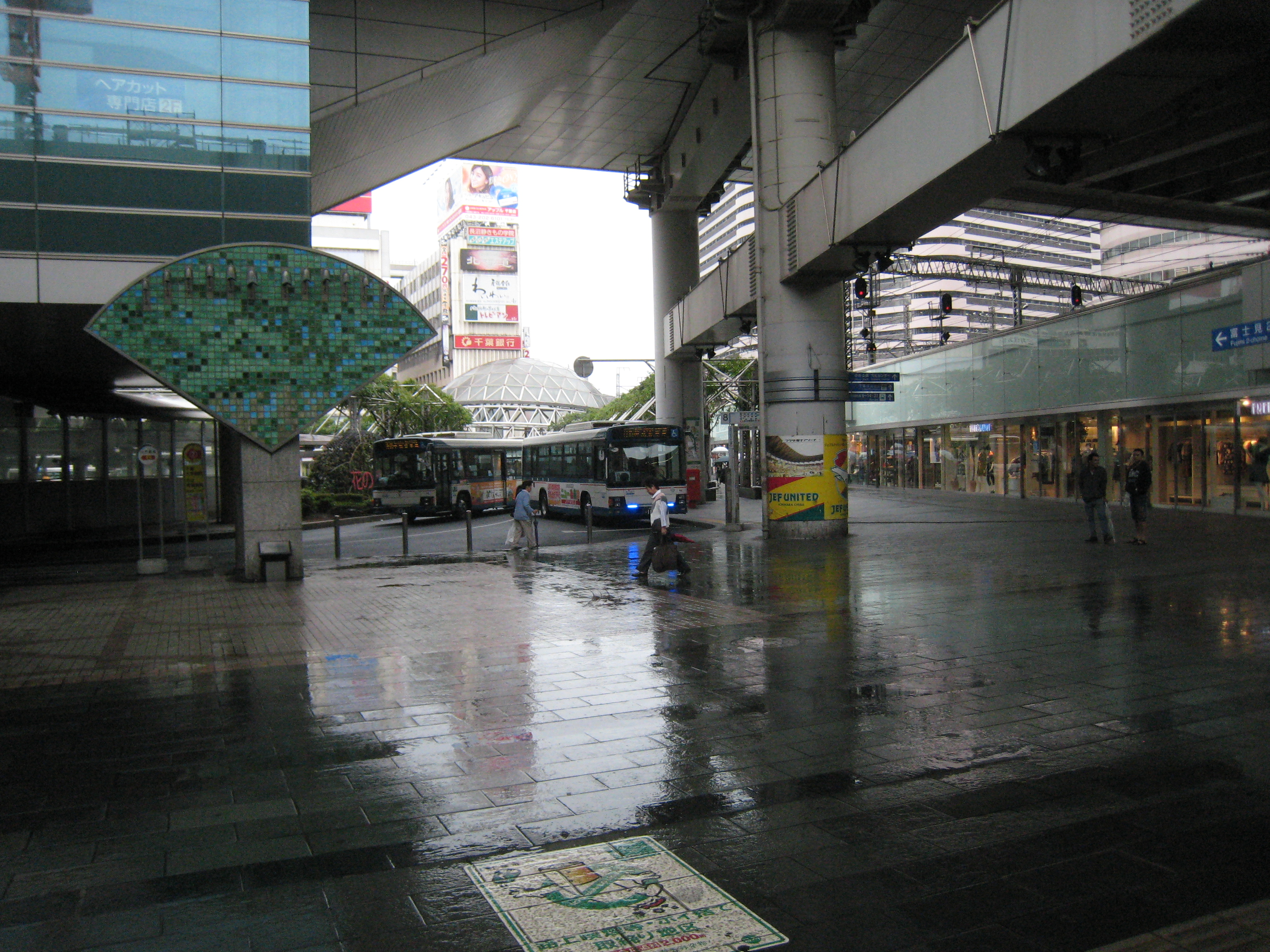
Chiba Station Interior

=== JR East ===
1-2	Chūō-Sōbu Line	for Nishi-Funabashi, Kinshichō, Akihabara, Shinjuku, Nakano, and Mitaka
3-4	■ Uchibō Line	for Soga, Kisarazu, Kimitsu, Tateyama, and Awa-Kamogawa
5-6	■ Sotobō Line	for Soga, Ōami, Kazusa-Ichinomiya, Katsuura, Tōgane, and Awa-Kamogawa
7-8	■ Sōbu Main Line	for Yotsukaidō, Sakura, Yachimata, Narutō, Yōkaichiba, and Chōshi
9-10	■ Narita Line	for Yotsukaidō, Sakura, Narita, Narita Airport (Terminal 2·3 and Terminal 1), Sawara, and Kashima-Jingū
3 - 10	Sōbu Line (Rapid)	for Funabashi, Kinshichō, Tokyo; Yokosuka Line for Yokohama, Ōfuna, and Kurihama

=== Chiba Urban Monorail ===
1	■ Line 1	for Yoshikawa-kōen and Kenchō-mae
2	■ Line 2	for Sports Center, Dōbutsukōen, and Chishirodai
3	■ Line 2	for Shiyakusho-mae and Chiba-Minato
4	■ Line 1	for Shiyakusho-mae and Chiba-Minato

== History ==
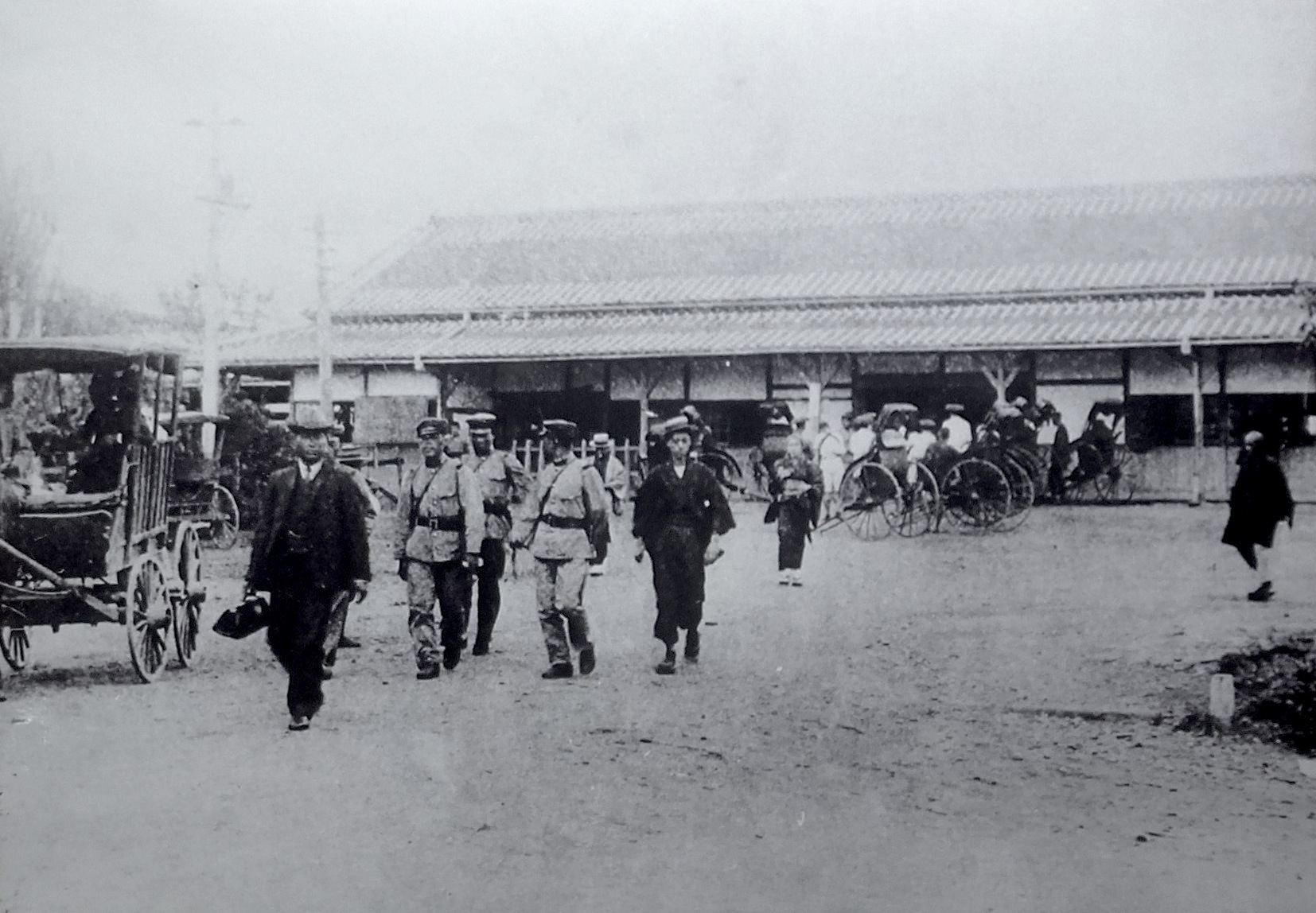
Chiba Station circa 1900

The station opened on 20 July 1894. The present station building was built in 1963. Rebuilding work was scheduled to start in January 2010, with the new station building opening in fiscal 2015.

== Passenger statistics ==
In fiscal 2024, the JR East station was used by 104,225 passengers daily (boarding passengers only), making it the 29th-busiest station operated by JR East. In fiscal 2024, the Chiba Urban Monorail station was used by an average of 14,112 passengers per day (boarding passengers only), making it the busiest station operated by Chiba Urban Monorail. The daily passenger figures (boarding passengers only) for JR East in previous years are as shown below.

Fiscal year	Daily average
2000	103,723
2005	103,401
2010	105,777
2011	104,788
2012	104,646
2013	105,812
2020	81,445
2024	104,225

== Bus terminal ==
=== Highway buses ===
- Flower Liner; For Tōgane Station, Gumyō Station, and Narutō Station
- Polar Star; For Sendai Station
- Kapina; For Makuta Station, Obitsu Station, Kururi Station, Kururi Castle, Awa-Kamogawa Station
- Nanso Satomi; For Tateyama Station, Kokonoe Station, Chikura Station
- For Ōtsu Station, Yamashina Station, Sanjō Station, and Kyōto Station
