= Chishirodai Station =

Monorail station in Chiba, Japan

Coordinates: 35.6225°N 140.1883°E

CM15 Chishirodai Station 千城台駅
- Chishirodai Station (March 2, 2026)

General information
- Location: 3-1-418 Chishirodai-Kita, Wakaba-ku, Chiba, Chiba （千葉市若葉区千城台北3-1-418） Japan
- Operator: Chiba Urban Monorail
- Line: Chiba Urban Monorail Line 2

History
- Opened: March 28, 1988

Passengers
- 2009: 4,482 daily

Services
Preceding station	Chiba Urban Monorail	Following station
Chishirodai-Kita CM14 towards Chiba	Line 2	Terminus
Location
- Location within Chiba Prefecture Location within Japan

Chishirodai Station (千城台駅, Chishirodai-eki) is a monorail train station on the Chiba Urban Monorail located in Wakaba-ku in the city of Chiba, Chiba Prefecture, Japan. It is the terminal station for Line 2 of the Chiba Urban Monorail and is located 12.0 kilometers from the northern terminus at Chiba Station.

== History ==
Chishirodai Station was opened on March 28, 1988.

== Lines ==
- Chiba Urban Monorail
  - Line 2

== Layout ==
Chishirodai Station is an elevated station with two opposed side platforms serving two tracks. Platform 1 is in use only during rush periods.

=== Platforms ===
1	■ Chiba Urban Monorail Line 2	for Tsuga, Chiba, and Chiba-Minato
2	■ Chiba Urban Monorail Line 2	for Tsuga, Chiba, and Chiba-Minato
