= Chibaminato Station =

Railway and monorail station in Chiba, Japan

JE17 CM01 Chibaminato Station 千葉みなと駅
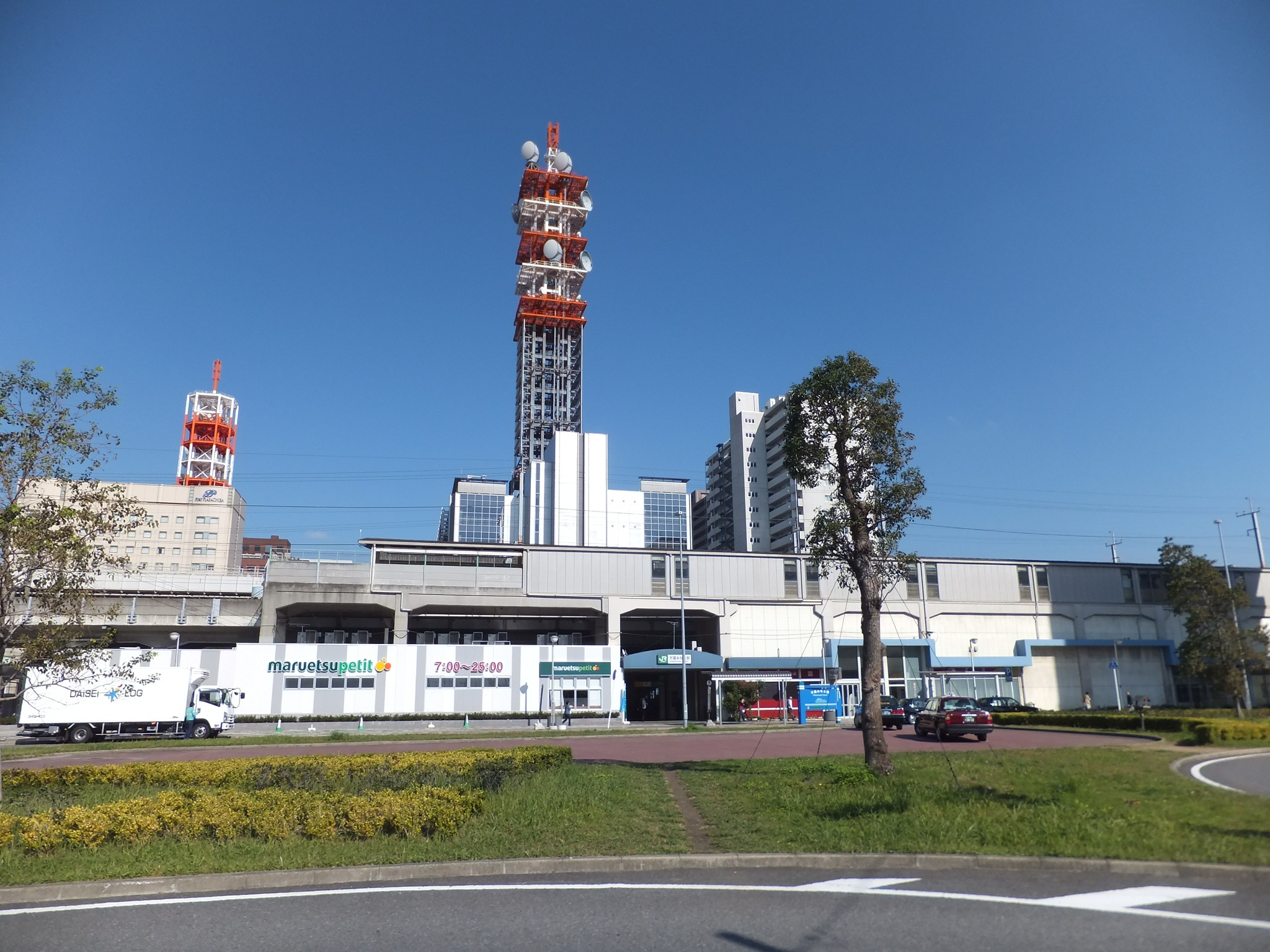
- The south side of the station in October 2011

General information
- Location: 1 Chuō-kō, Chuo-ku, Chiba-shi, Chiba-ken; Japan
- Coordinates: 35°36′22.26″N 140°6′12.21″E
- Operator: JR East; Chiba Urban Monorail
- Distance: 39.0 km (24.2 mi) from Tokyo
- Platforms: 3 side + 1 island platform

Construction
- Structure type: Elevated

Other information
- Station code: JE17; CM01
- Website: Official website

History
- Opened: 3 March 1986

Passengers
- 17,199 (JR FY2019); 8,264 (Chiba Urban FY2018) daily

Services
Preceding station	JR East	Following station
Inagekaigan JE16 towards Tokyo	Keiyō Line Rapid Local	Soga Terminus
Preceding station	Chiba Urban Monorail	Following station
Terminus	Line 1	Shiyakusho-mae CM02 towards Kenchō-mae
Terminus	Line 2	Shiyakusho-mae CM02 towards Chishirodai
Location
- Location within Tokyo Keiyo area Location within Chiba Prefecture Location within Japan

Chibaminato Station (Japanese: 千葉みなと駅, Hepburn: Chiba-Minato-eki) is an interchange passenger railway station located in Chūō-ku, Chiba, Japan, operated by East Japan Railway Company (JR East) and the Chiba Urban Monorail.

== Lines ==
Chibaminato Station is served by the JR East Keiyō Line and the Chiba Urban Monorail. It is located 39.0 kilometres (24.2 mi) from the starting point of the Keiyō Line at Tokyo Station and is the terminal station for the Chiba Urban Monorail's line 1 and 2.

== Station layout ==
The JR portion of the station consists of one side platform and one island platform serving three elevated tracks, with the station building underneath. The station is staffed. The Chiba Urban Monorail Chibaminato Station has two side platforms with two tracks between them, and is also an elevated station.

=== JR East platforms ===
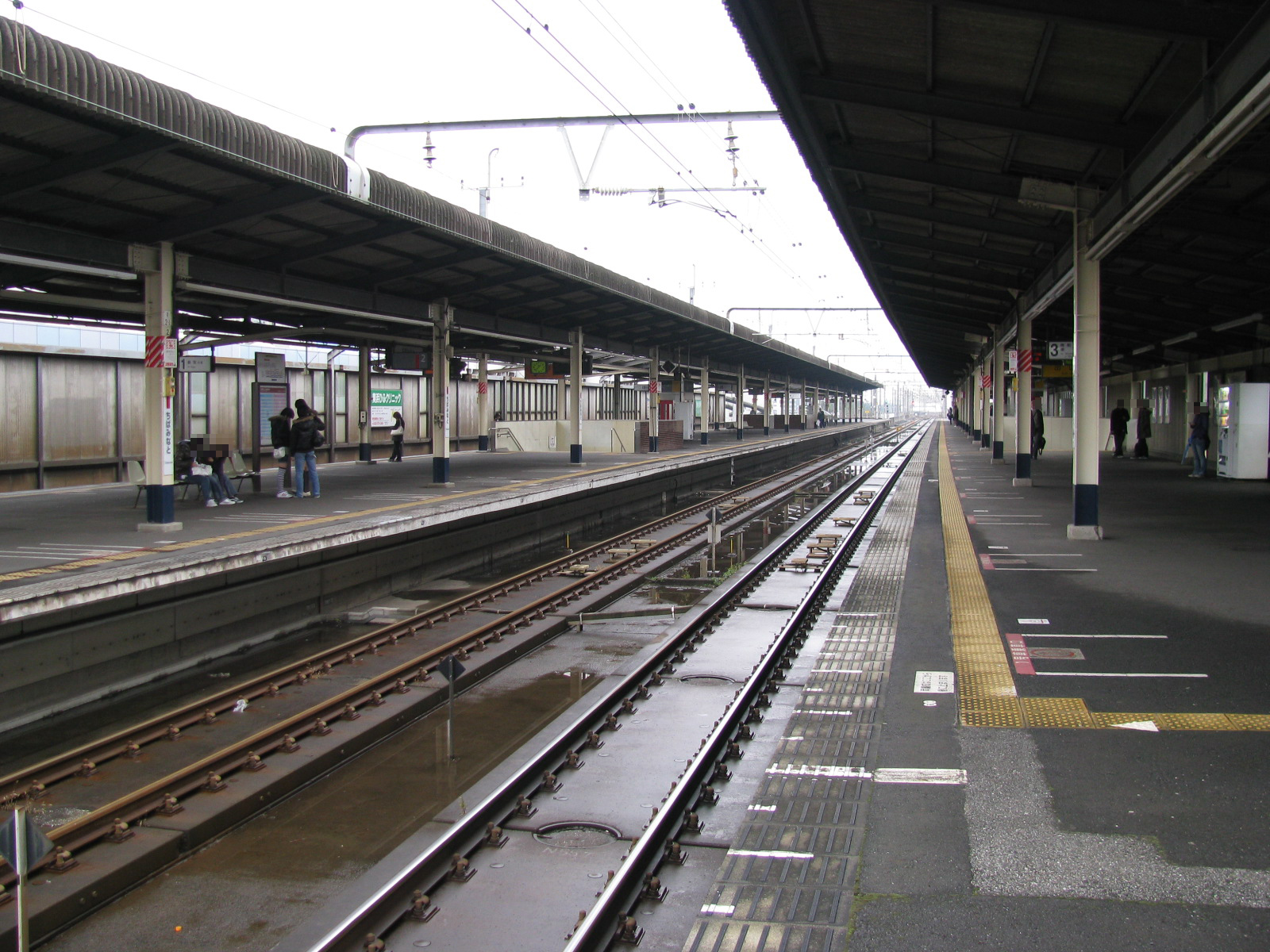
JR East platforms, December 2007

1-2	Keiyō Line	for Soga, Kisarazu, Kazusa-Minato, Kazusa-Ichinomiya, and Katsuura
2-3	Keiyō Line	for Kaihimmakuhari, Maihama, Shin-Kiba, and Tokyo

=== Chiba Urban Monorail platforms ===
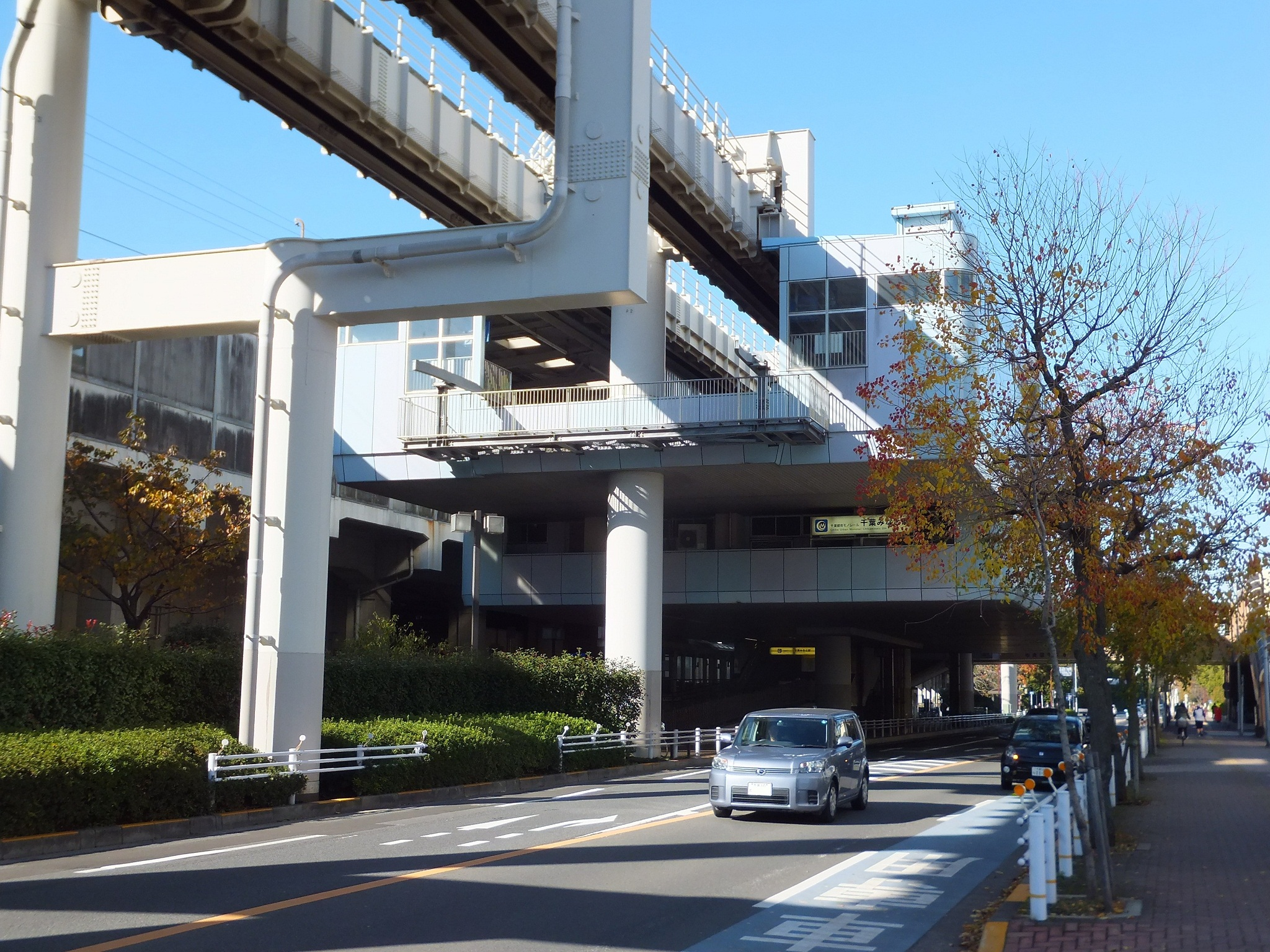
Chiba Urban Monorail Chiba-Minato Station

1/2	■ Chiba Urban Monorail	for Kenchō-mae or Chishirodai

== History ==
The JR East station opened on 3 March 1986. The station was absorbed into the JR East network upon the privatization of the Japan National Railways (JNR) on 1 April 1987.

Station numbering was introduced to the JR East platforms in 2016 with Chibaminato being assigned station number JE16. With the opening of Makuharitoyosuna in 2023, stations further down on the Keiyo Line were each shifted down one station number. As such, Chibaminato was reassigned station number JE17.

== Passenger statistics ==
In fiscal 2019, the JR portion of the station was used by an average of 17,199 passengers daily (boarding passengers only). In fiscal 2018, the Chiba Urban Monorail portion of the station was served by 8,264 passengers.

== Surrounding area ==
- Chiba city office
- Chiba-Chūō Police Station
- Chiba Port Tower
- Chiba Prefectural Museum of Art
- NHK Chiba broadcasting station
- Chiba Bank Head office

== See also ==
- List of railway stations in Japan
