= Turrialba =

Turrialba may refer to:

== Places ==
- Turrialba Volcano
- Turrialba Volcano National Park, created around Turrialba Volcano.
- Turrialba (canton), located in Cartago Province
- Turrialba (district), located in Turrialba canton.

== Other ==
- Turrialba cheese, created in the Santa Cruz district of Turrialba canton.
