= Santa Teresita District =

District in Turrialba canton, Cartago province, Costa Rica

Santa Teresita
- District
- Santa Teresita district
- Santa Teresita district location in Costa Rica
- Coordinates: 9.986014°N 83.6709824°W
- Country: Costa Rica
- Province: Cartago
- Canton: Turrialba
- Creation: 11 June 1968

Area
  - Total: 60 km^{2} (23 sq mi)
- Elevation: 480 m (1,570 ft)

Population (2011)
  - Total: 4,744
  - Density: 79/km^{2} (200/sq mi)
- Time zone: UTC−06:00
- Postal code: 30505

Santa Teresita is a district of the Turrialba canton, in the Cartago province of Costa Rica.

== History ==
Santa Teresita was created on 11 June 1968 by Decreto Ejecutivo 20. Segregated from Peralta.

== Geography ==
Santa Teresita has an area of 60 km^{2} (23 sq mi) and an elevation of 480 metres.

== Demographics ==
Historical population
| Census | Pop. | ±% p.a. |
|---|---|---|
| 1973 | 2,894 | — |
| 1984 | 3,835 | +2.59% |
| 2000 | 5,095 | +1.79% |
| 2011 | 4,744 | −0.65% |
| 2022 | 6,121 | +2.34% |
Source: Instituto Nacional de Estadística y Censos; Centro Centroamericano de Población

For the 2011 census, Santa Teresita had a population of 4,744 inhabitants.

== Transportation ==
=== Road transportation ===
The district is covered by the following road routes:

- National Route 415

== Tourism ==
The Guayabo National Monument is located between this district and Santa Cruz district, both in Turrialba canton.
