= Uekusa =

Uekusa (written: 植草) is a Japanese surname. Notable people with the surname include:

- Ayumi Uekusa (植草 歩, born 1992), Japanese karateka
- Kazuhide Uekusa (植草 一秀, born 1960), Japanese economist
- Yuki Uekusa (植草 裕樹, born 1982), Japanese footballer
- Kazuhisa Uekusa (植草和久, born 1987), Japanese entertainer

== See also ==
- Uekusa University, a university in Chiba, Chiba Prefecture Japan
- Uekusa Gakuen Junior College, a junior college in Chiba, Chiba Prefecture Japan
