= Tuis =

Tuis, TUIS, TUIs, or TUI may refer to:

- Plural of tūī, a species of passerine bird native to New Zealand
- Tuis District, Costa Rica
- Tuis (magazine), a South African magazine published by Media24
- Tokyo University of Information Sciences, a private university in Japan
- Text-based user interfaces, also known as terminal user interfaces
- Text User Interface, a text-based user interface for GDB
