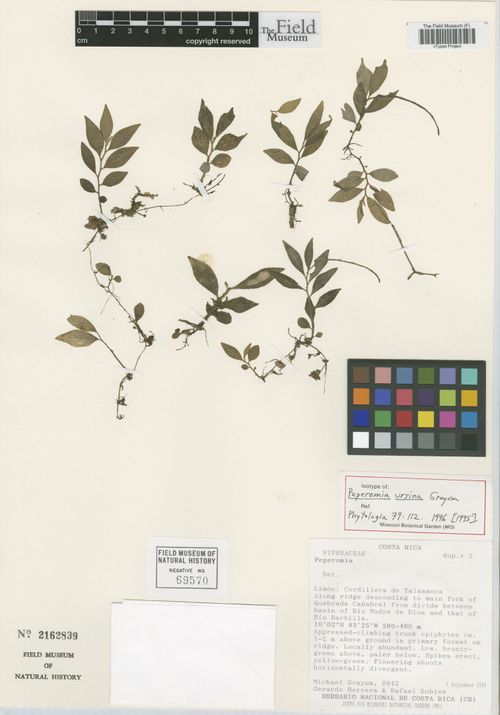

Scientific classification
- Kingdom: Plantae
- Clade: Tracheophytes
- Clade: Angiosperms
- Clade: Magnoliids
- Order: Piperales
- Family: Piperaceae
- Genus: Peperomia
- Species: P. ursina

Binomial name
- Peperomia ursina Grayum

= Peperomia ursina =

Species of flowering plant

Peperomia ursina is a species of epiphyte or lithophyte from the genus Peperomia. It was first described by Michael Howard Grayum and published in the book "Phytologia 79(2): 112–113. 1995[1996]". It primarily grows on wet tropical biomes.

== Distribution ==
It is endemic to Costa Rica. First specimens where found at an altitude of 280–400 meters (920–1,310 ft) in Limón by the Atlantic slope of the Costa Rican Cordillera de Talamanca.

- Costa Rica
  - Limón
    - Bratsi
  - Heredia
    - La Virgen

== Description ==
Stoloniferous, appressed-climbing epiphytes or epilithic. Stems: spreading-hirsute with uniseriate hairs, 2–8 x 0.10–0.15 cm, erect to decumbent. The leaves change. Petiole: pubescent as stems, 0.1–0.3 cm. Lower leaves are smaller; distal and medical measure 1–3.6 x 0.5 x 1.5 cm; they are impeltate, narrowly elliptic to rhombic, acute at base, subacute to subacuminate at apex, and have hirsute surfaces on both sides. Single inflorescences at the tip of the stalk. Peduncle spreading hirsute, 0.1–1 cm. The yellow-green spikes measure 1.3–5 cm x 0.7–1.5 mm. Flowers are fairly separated; the rachis is glabrous; the anthers are broadly elliptic, measuring 0.15–0.25 mm; the bracts are 0.3–0.4 mm wide, suborbicular, and thickly grandular-punctate. Fruits measure 0.5–0.6 × 0.5–0.6 mm in size. Their bodies are globose, rounded at the base, and protrude on a triangular stipe. The triangular stipe has a papillate, 0.5–0.6 mm dimension with a thick, conical beak that extends to around 0.15 mm.

This species has the most resemblance to Peperomia alata and related species, which are distinguished by solitary inflorescences and alternating, distichous leaves with thin, palmately veuined blades. Its rich, uniform hirsute pubescence, which is reflected in the specific epithet, sets it apart significantly from the majority of species in this group. This species belongs to the Costa Rican Piperaceae family, which is closely related to Peperomia tuisana and Peperomia montecristana. However, it is distinct from both species due to its shorter petioles and significantly shorter inflorescences.
