= Tayutic =

District in Turrialba canton, Cartago province, Costa Rica

- District
- Tayutic district
- Tayutic district location in Costa Rica
- Coordinates: 9.8114286°N 83.547567°W
- Country: Costa Rica
- Province: Cartago
- Canton: Turrialba
- Creation: 11 June 1968

Area
  - Total: 74.91 km^{2} (28.92 sq mi)
- Elevation: 870 m (2,850 ft)

Population (2011)
  - Total: 2,374
  - Density: 31.69/km^{2} (82.08/sq mi)
- Time zone: UTC−06:00
- Postal code: 30508

Tayutic is a district of the Turrialba canton, in the Cartago province of Costa Rica.

== History ==
Tayutic was created on 11 June 1968 by Decreto Ejecutivo 20. Segregated from La Suiza.

== Geography ==
Tayutic has an area of 74.91 km^{2} (28.92 sq mi) and an elevation of 870 metres.

== Demographics ==
Historical population
Census	Pop.	±% p.a.
1973	2,448	—
1984	3,129	+2.26%
2000	4,452	+2.23%
2011	2,374	−5.56%
2022	3,152	+2.61%
Source: Instituto Nacional de Estadística y Censos; Centro Centroamericano de Población

For the 2011 census, Tayutic had a population of 2,374 inhabitants.

== Transportation ==
=== Road transportation ===
The district is covered by the following road routes:

- National Route 414
