= Wakaba-ku =

Wakaba 若葉区
- Ward
- Wakaba Ward
- Flag Seal

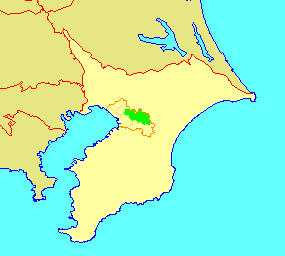
- Location of Wakaba in Chiba

- Coordinates: 35°37′46″N 140°09′46″E
- Country: Japan
- Region: Kantō
- Prefecture: Chiba
- City: Chiba

Area
  - Total: 84.21 km^{2} (32.51 sq mi)

Population (April 2012)
  - Total: 151,593
  - Density: 1,800/km^{2} (4,700/sq mi)
- Time zone: UTC+9 (Japan Standard Time)
- Address: 2-1-1 Sakuragi-kita, Wakaba-ku Chiba-shi, Chiba-ken; 264-8733
- Website: Official website of Wakaba-ku

Wakaba Ward within Chiba

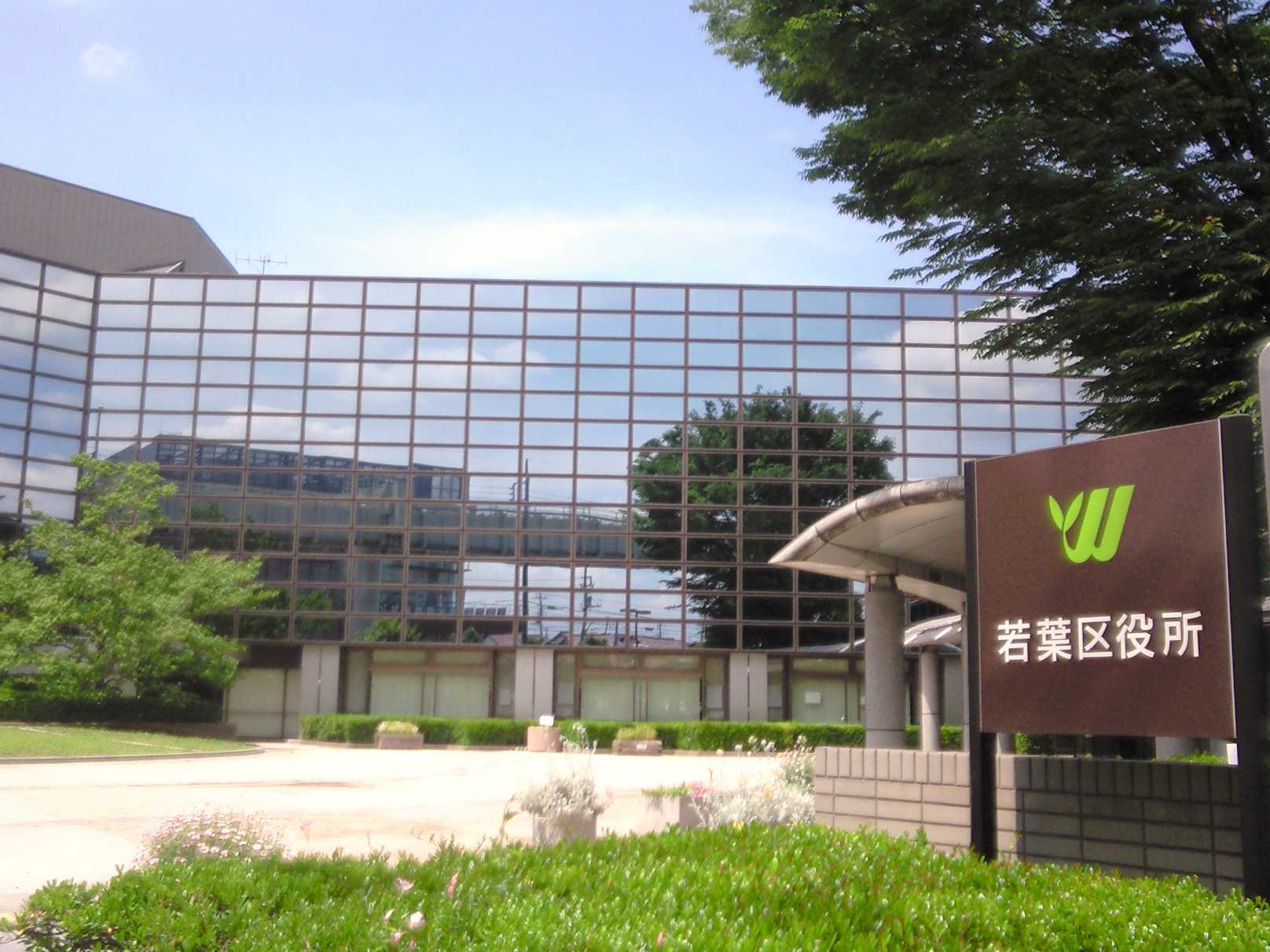
Wakaba Ward Office

Wakaba Ward (若葉区, Wakaba-ku) is one of the six wards of the city of Chiba in Chiba Prefecture, Japan. As of April 2012, the ward had an estimated population of 151,593 and a population density of 1,800 persons per km^{2}. The total area was 84.21 km^{2}, making it the largest of the six wards of Chiba city.

== Geography ==
Wakaba Ward is located in an inland area of southeastern Chiba city.

=== Surrounding municipalities ===
- Inage Ward
- Chūō Ward
- Midori Ward
- Tōgane, Chiba
- Yachiyo, Chiba
- Sakura, Chiba
- Yotsukaidō, Chiba

== History ==
After the Meiji Restoration, the area of present-day Wakaba Ward was divided on April 1, 1889 into the villages of Tsuga, Miyako, Chishiro, Shirai and Sarashina within Chiba District. On February 11, 1935, Tsuga and Miyako villages were annexed by the neighboring city of Chiba, followed by Chishiro village on February 11, 1944. On March 31, 1955, Shirai and Sarashina merged to form the new town of Izumi, which was subsequently annexed by the city of Chiba on April 10, 1963.

With the promotion of Chiba to a designated city with additional autonomy from Chiba prefecture and the central government on April 1, 1992, Wakaba Ward was created as an administrative unit.

== Economy ==
Wakaba Ward is largely a regional commercial center and bedroom community for central Chiba and Tokyo.

== Transportation ==
=== Railroads ===
- JR East – Sōbu Line
  - Tsuga
- Chiba Urban Monorail – Line 2
  - Dōbutsukōen • Mitsuwadai • Tsuga • Sakuragi • Oguradai • Chishirodai-Kita • Chishirodai

=== Highways ===
- Chiba-Tōgane Road
- Keiyō Road
- Japan National Route 16
- Japan National Route 126
- Japan National Route 51

== Education ==
- Tokyo University of Information Sciences
- Uekusa University
- Uekusa Gakuen Junior College

Municipal elementary and junior high schools are operated by the Chiba City Board of Education (千葉市教育委員会).

Municipal junior high schools:

- Chishirodaiminami (千城台南中学校)
- Chishirodainishi (千城台西中学校)
- Kaizuka (貝塚中学校)
- Kasori (加曽利中学校)
- Mitsuwadai (みつわ台中学校)
- Omiya (大宮中学校)
- Sanno (山王中学校)
- Sarashina (更科中学校)
- Shirai (白井中学校)
- Wakamatsu (若松中学校)

Municipal elementary schools:

- Chishiro (千城小学校)
- Chishirodai Higashi (千城台東小学校)
- Chishirodai Mirai (千城台みらい小学校)
- Chishirodai Wakaba (千城台わかば小学校)
- Kita Kaizuka (北貝塚小学校)
- Minamoto (源小学校)
- Mitsuwadai Kita (みつわ台北小学校)
- Mitsuwadai Minami (みつわ台南小学校)
- Ogura (小倉小学校)
- Omiya (大宮小学校)
- Sakazuki (坂月小学校)
- Sakuragi (桜木小学校)
- Sarashima (更科小学校)
- Shirai (白井小学校)
- Tsuganodai (都賀の台小学校)
- Wakamatsu (若松小学校)
- Wakamatsudai (若松台小学校)

Former elementary schools:

- Chishirodai Asahi (千城台旭小学校)
- Chishirodai Kita (千城台北小学校)
- Chishirodai Minami (千城台南小学校)
- Chishirodai Nishi (千城台西小学校)
- Omiyadai (大宮台小学校)

== Noted people from Wakaba Ward ==
- Kazuhisa Ishii – professional baseball player
- Shugo Oshinari – actor
- Tatsuya Morita – professional soccer player
- Naoto Kamifukumoto – professional soccer player
