= Peperomia turialvensis =

Scientific classification
- Kingdom: Plantae
- Clade: Tracheophytes
- Clade: Angiosperms
- Clade: Magnoliids
- Order: Piperales
- Family: Piperaceae
- Genus: Peperomia
- Species: P. turialvensis

Binomial name
- Peperomia turialvensis C.DC.

Species of epiphyte

Peperomia turialvensis is a species of epiphyte in the genus Peperomia. It was first described by Casimir de Candolle and published in the book "Linnaea 37: 380–381. 1871-1873[1872]. (Jul 1872)". It primarily grows on wet tropical biomes. The species name came from Turrialva, where first specimens of this species were collected. It may be a synonym of Peperomia rhexiifolia.

== Distribution ==
It is endemic to Costa Rica and Panama. First specimens where found at an altitude of 914.4 meters in Turrialba, Costa Rica.

- Costa Rica
  - Limón
  - Puntarenas
  - Cartago
    - Paraíso
    - Turrialba
- Panama
  - Darién

== Description ==
The dark vein runs near the border, the apex of the four petiolate lanceolate leaflets is glabrous on both sides. The base is acute opaque coriaceous pellucido-punctolate, and the apex is acuminate. The five nerves are delicately ciliated, with three of the central ones being stronger under the prominuli. With glabrous peduncles that almost equal the peduncles, axillary, tympanic, and long-stalked peduncles. The bractea rotundato is oblong with a peltate centre. The stigma papillose. The bean oval with a semi-immersed rostellate apex, and the lower stigmatic apex submerged in the ovary.
