= Pavones District =

District in Turrialba canton, Cartago province, Costa Rica

Pavones
- District
- Pavones district
- Pavones district location in Costa Rica
- Coordinates: 9.913831°N 83.6133594°W
- Country: Costa Rica
- Province: Cartago
- Canton: Turrialba
- Creation: 11 June 1968

Area
  - Total: 42.13 km^{2} (16.27 sq mi)
- Elevation: 819 m (2,687 ft)

Population (2011)
  - Total: 4,331
  - Density: 102.8/km^{2} (266.3/sq mi)
- Time zone: UTC−06:00
- Postal code: 30506

Pavones is a district of the Turrialba canton, in the Cartago province of Costa Rica.

== History ==
Pavones was created on 11 June 1968 by Decreto Ejecutivo 20. Segregated from Peralta.

== Geography ==
Pavones has an area of 42.13 km^{2} and an elevation of 819 metres.

== Demographics ==
Historical population
Census	Pop.	±% p.a.
1973	2,433	—
1984	2,960	+1.80%
2000	4,431	+2.55%
2011	4,331	−0.21%
2022	5,453	+2.12%
Source: Instituto Nacional de Estadística y Censos; Centro Centroamericano de Población

For the 2011 census, Pavones had a population of 4,331 inhabitants.

== Transportation ==
=== Road transportation ===
The district is covered by the following road routes:

- National Route 10
- National Route 232
