= Santa Rosa District, Turrialba =

District in Turrialba canton, Cartago province, Costa Rica

Santa Rosa
- District
- Santa Rosa district
- Santa Rosa district location in Costa Rica
- Coordinates: 9.9377805°N 83.7192266°W
- Country: Costa Rica
- Province: Cartago
- Canton: Turrialba
- Creation: 11 June 1968

Area
  - Total: 22.29 km^{2} (8.61 sq mi)
- Elevation: 810 m (2,660 ft)

Population (2011)
  - Total: 5,232
  - Density: 234.7/km^{2} (607.9/sq mi)
- Time zone: UTC−06:00
- Postal code: 30509

Santa Rosa is a district of the Turrialba canton, in the Cartago province of Costa Rica.

== History ==
Santa Rosa was created on 11 June 1968 by Decreto Ejecutivo 20. Segregated from Turrialba.

== Geography ==
Santa Rosa has an area of 22.29 km^{2} and an elevation of 810 metres.

== Demographics ==
Historical population
Census	Pop.	±% p.a.
1973	5,551	—
1984	3,874	−3.22%
2000	4,759	+1.29%
2011	5,232	+0.87%
2022	5,953	+1.18%
Source: Instituto Nacional de Estadística y Censos; Centro Centroamericano de Población

For the 2011 census, Santa Rosa had a population of 5,232 inhabitants.

== Transportation ==
=== Road transportation ===
The district is covered by the following road routes:

- National Route 230
