= Serpentario de Monteverde =

Park in Costa Rica

- Serpentario de Monteverde
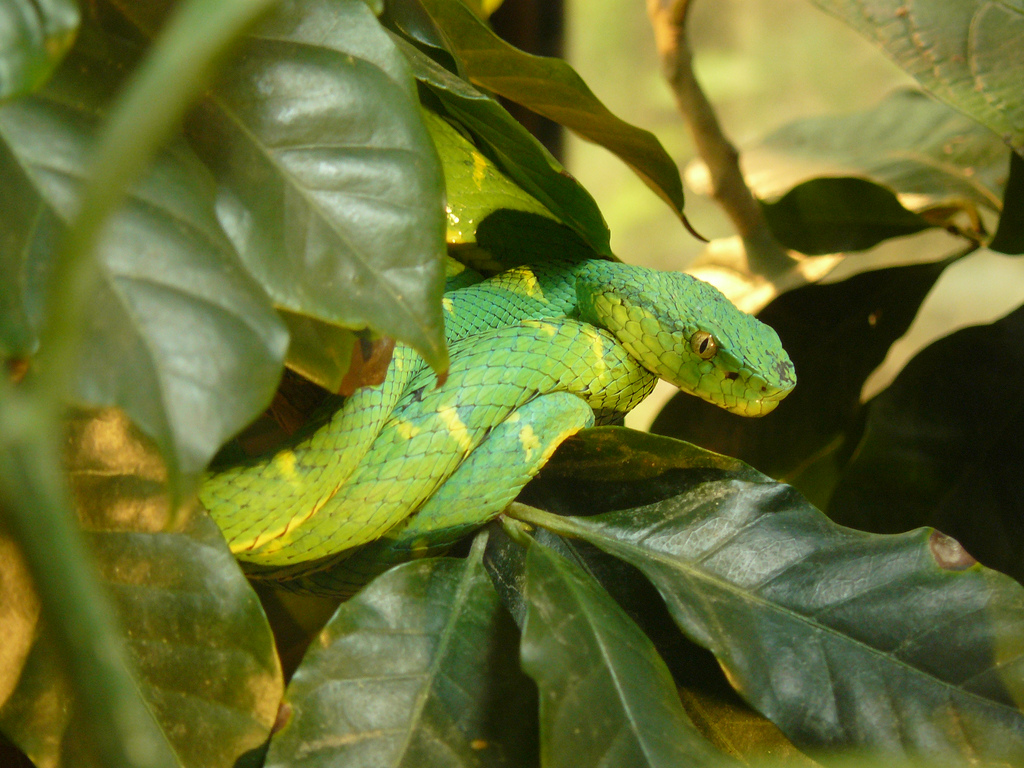
- Side-striped palm-pitviper in display at the Serpentarium
- Interactive map of Serpentario de Monteverde
- Type: Urban park, Serpentarium.
- Location: Alajuela Province, Costa Rica
- Coordinates: 10°18′58″N 84°49′22″W
- Operator: Centro de Ciencias Tropicales
- Status: Open all year

Serpentario de Monteverde (Snake Tour Herpetarium) is an urban park of approximately 14 hectares (35 acres), located in southern Monteverde, in the Puntarenas Province, Costa Rica. It has an average altitude of 1327 meters and is contiguous to the Monteverde Orchid Garden to the north and the Butterfly Garden to the south. The site includes reptiles, poison arrow frogs and over 20 species of snakes. Most species in the serpentarium can be found wild in the surrounding forests.

The Serpentarium of Monteverde is located in the heart of the Cordillera de Tilarán. Most of the surrounding areas are protected by the Zona Protectora Arenal-Monteverde which makes for a mostly undisturbed set of cloud forests over 4,000 feet in elevation. The park is in the south suburbs of Santa Elena, the main commercial center of the zone.

== See also ==
- Serpentario Viborana
- List of zoos by country: Costa Rica zoos
