= Chirripó District =

District in Cartago province, Costa Rica

Chirripó
- District
- Interactive map of Chirripó
- Chirripó district location in Costa Rica
- Coordinates: 9.7354283°N 83.4808879°W
- Country: Costa Rica
- Province: Cartago
- Canton: Turrialba
- Creation: 4 October 2001

Area
  - Total: 942.09 km^{2} (363.74 sq mi)
- Elevation: 1,115 m (3,658 ft)

Population (2011)
  - Total: 4,185
  - Density: 4.442/km^{2} (11.51/sq mi)
- Time zone: UTC−06:00
- Postal code: 30512

Chirripó is a district of the Turrialba canton, in the Cartago province of Costa Rica.

== History ==
Chirripó was created on 4 October 2001 by Ley 8150.

== Geography ==
Chirripó has an area of 942.09 km^{2} (363.74 sq mi) and an elevation of 1,115 metres.

== Demographics ==
Historical population
Census	Pop.	±% p.a.
2011	4,185	—
2022	5,098	+1.81%
Source: Instituto Nacional de Estadística y Censos; Centro Centroamericano de Población

For the 2011 census, Chirripó had a population of 4,185 inhabitants.

== Transportation ==
=== Road transportation ===
The district is covered by the following road routes:

- National Route 414
