= National Route 411 (Costa Rica) =

National Road Route in Costa Rica

National Tertiary Route 411
- Ruta nacional terciaria 411

Route information
- Maintained by Ministry of Public Works and Transport
- Length: 12.640 km (7.854 mi)

Location
- Country: Costa Rica
- Provinces: Cartago

Highway system
- National Road Network of Costa Rica
← Route 409	→ Route 413

National Tertiary Route 411, or just Route 411 (Spanish: Ruta Nacional Terciaria 411, or Ruta 411) is a National Road Route of Costa Rica, located in the Cartago province.

== Description ==
In Cartago province the route covers Turrialba canton (Turrialba district).
