= Sakuragi Station (Chiba) =

Monorail station in Chiba, Japan

CM12 Sakuragi Station 桜木駅
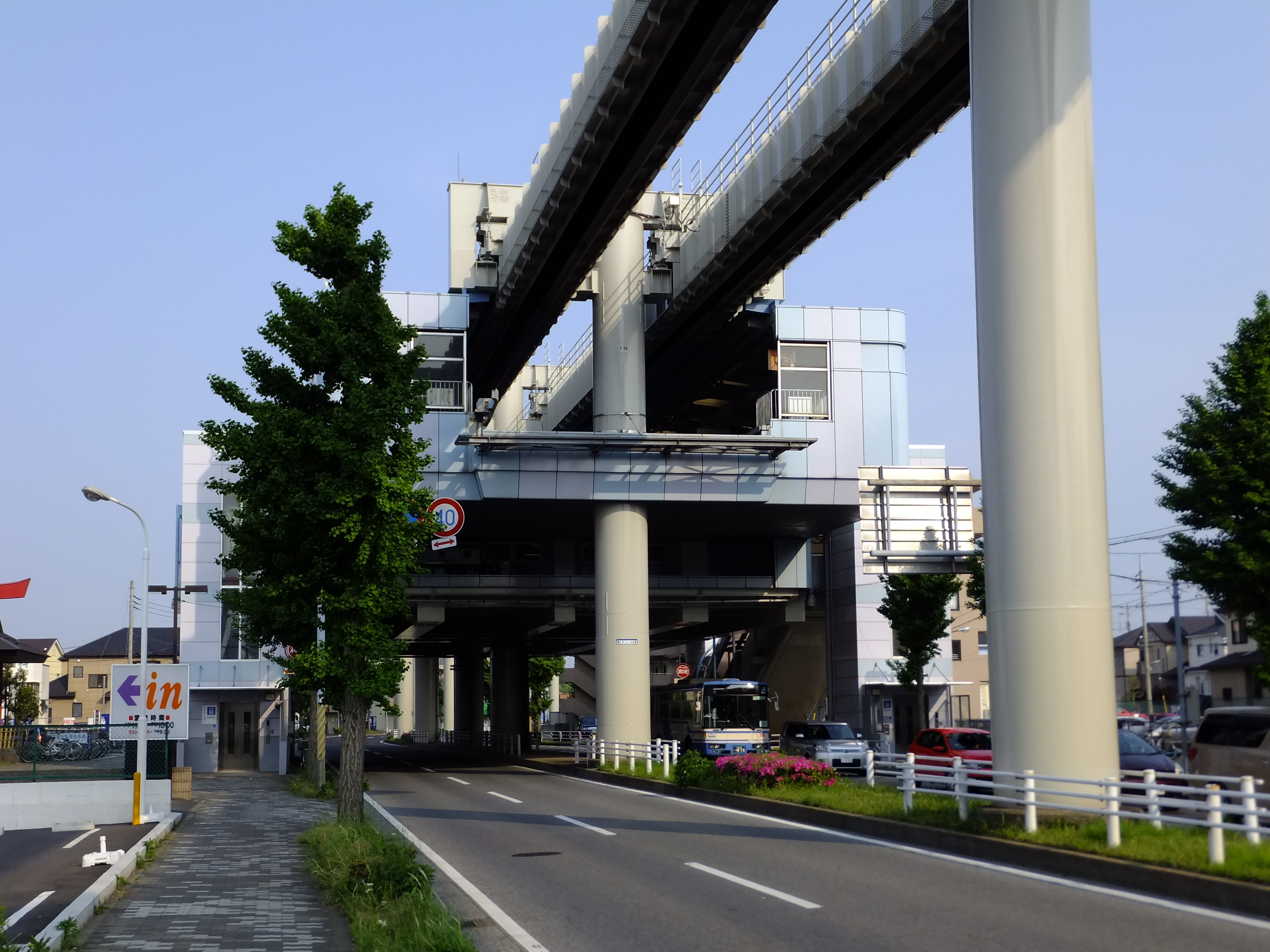
- Sakuragi Station in May 2012

General information
- Location: 335-4 Sakuragi, Wakaba-ku, Chiba-shi, Chiba-ken; Japan
- Coordinates: 35°37′52.5″N 140°09′39.5″E
- Operator: Chiba Urban Monorail
- Line: Chiba Urban Monorail Line 2

History
- Opened: March 28, 1988

Passengers
- FY2009: 1,436 daily

Services
Preceding station	Chiba Urban Monorail	Following station
Tsuga CM11 towards Chiba	Line 2	Oguradai CM13 towards Chishirodai
Location
- Location within Chiba Prefecture Location within Japan

Sakuragi Station (桜木駅, Sakuragi-eki) is a monorail station on the Chiba Urban Monorail in Wakaba-ku in the city of Chiba, Chiba Prefecture, Japan. It is located 9.0 kilometers from the northern terminus of the line at Chiba Station.

== Lines ==
- Chiba Urban Monorail Line 2

== Layout ==
Sakuragi Station is an elevated station with two opposed side platforms serving two tracks.

=== Platforms ===
1	■ Chiba Urban Monorail Line 2	for Chishirodai
2	■ Chiba Urban Monorail Line 2	for Tsuga, Chiba, and Chiba-Minato

== History ==
Sakuragi Station was opened on March 28, 1988.

== See also ==
- List of railway stations in Japan
