= Tres Equis =

District in Turrialba canton, Cartago province, Costa Rica

- District
- Tres Equis district
- Tres Equis district location in Costa Rica
- Coordinates: 9.9513909°N 83.5745477°W
- Country: Costa Rica
- Province: Cartago
- Canton: Turrialba
- Creation: 25 April 1994

Area
  - Total: 37.18 km^{2} (14.36 sq mi)
- Elevation: 630 m (2,070 ft)

Population (2011)
  - Total: 1,808
  - Density: 48.63/km^{2} (125.9/sq mi)
- Time zone: UTC−06:00
- Postal code: 30510

Tres Equis is a district of the Turrialba canton, in the Cartago province of Costa Rica.

== History ==
Tres Equis was created on 25 April 1994.

== Geography ==
Tres Equis has an area of 37.18 km^{2} and an elevation of 630 metres.

== Demographics ==
Historical population
Census	Pop.	±% p.a.
2000	1,946	—
2011	1,808	−0.67%
2022	2,386	+2.55%
Source: Instituto Nacional de Estadística y Censos; Centro Centroamericano de Población

For the 2011 census, Tres Equis had a population of 1,808 inhabitants.

== Transportation ==
=== Road transportation ===
The district is covered by the following road routes:

- National Route 10
- National Route 413
