= Centro Agronómico Tropical de Investigación y Enseñanza =

Costa Rican-based research institute

Tropical Agricultural Research and Higher Education Center
- Centro Agronómico Tropical de Investigación y Enseñanza
- CATIE
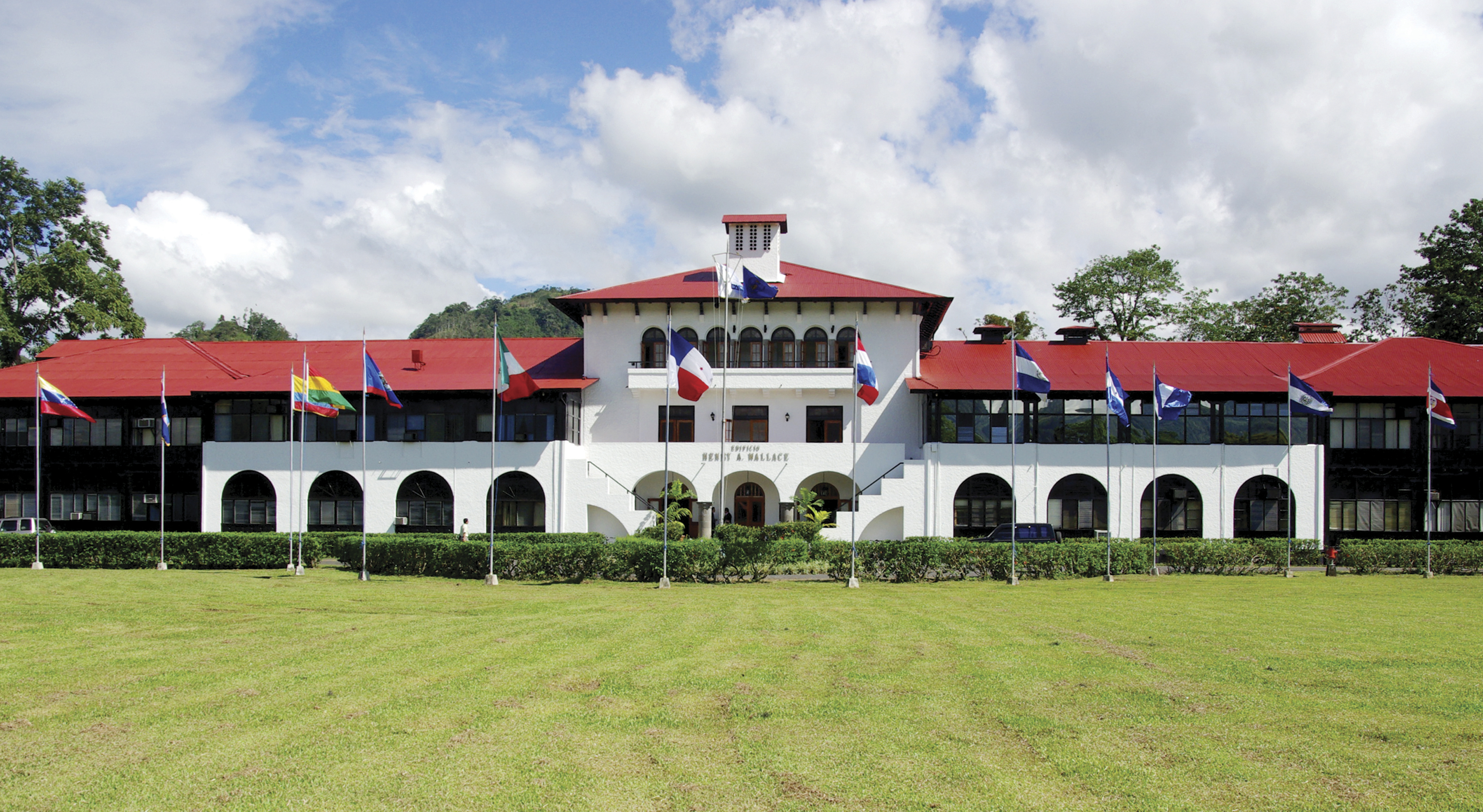
- Established: 1942
- Field of research: Climate Smart Agriculture, Agronomy, Tropical Agriculture, Forestry Conservation, Forestry Management
- Director: Luis Pocasangre
- Staff: 1500
- Students: 200
- Location: CATIE 7170 Carretera hacia Siquirres, Turrialba, Cartago, Costa Rica
- Website: https://catie.ac.cr/en/

The Tropical Agricultural Research and Higher Education Center (Centro Agronómico Tropical de Investigación y Enseñanza or CATIE) is an international institute for agricultural development and biological conservation in Central America and the Caribbean, combining science, education and innovation. CATIE is the first graduate school in Agricultural Sciences in Latin America.

== History ==
CATIE's origin dates back to October 7, 1942 when the Inter-American Institute for Agricultural Sciences (IICA) was founded. From its inception, the Institute's mandate has centered on research and education in agriculture and natural resources in the American tropics. The Graduate School began its operations in 1946.

In 1960, IICA's General Directorate was moved from Turrialba to San José, Costa Rica; research and teaching activities continued in Turrialba. Agriculture, from the beginning, implied a broad spectrum of activities and disciplines including crop production, livestock management, renewable natural resources and the social and economic dimensions of these fields of endeavor. Eventually, the Turrialba base of the Institute was transformed into a Center for Education and Research (CEI). Over a nine-year period, beginning in 1960, significant changes led to a strengthening of training opportunities for Latin American professionals, thereby laying the 6 groundwork for agricultural development in the region. In 1970, the Center for Education and Research was named the Tropical Center for Education and Research (CTEI).

The year 1973 was an important one for this institution. The Centro Agronómico Tropical de Investigación y Enseñanza (CATIE) was definitively established as an autonomous entity dedicated to research, higher education and outreach activities. Eighteen years later, in 1991, the governing body of CATIE was constituted to create a wholly independent Board of Directors made up of well-renowned individuals from throughout the world who represent “no one but themselves”, thereby providing autonomy and stability to the institution. Additionally, the Superior Council, composed of Ministers from the Ministries of Agriculture or Environment of CATIE's member countries, oversees the institution and ensures that the interests of their countries are represented in CATIE's plans and activities.

Today, CATIE is an international, non-profit institution dedicated to research, higher education and outreach in agricultural sciences, natural resources and related topics in the American tropics. CATIE's Mission is to “Increase sustainable and inclusive human well-being in Latin America and the Caribbean, promoting education, research and innovation for development, sustainable management of agriculture and conservation of natural resources.”

The graduate program at CATIE has a long and proud history. The M.Sc. program dates back to 1946 and has produced over 2000 graduates, the majority of whom have served the region and their professions in leadership positions. Three professional master's degrees have been successfully introduced at CATIE since 2007. In 1996, after a careful study, a doctoral program was initiated in partnership with leading institutions in the United States and Europe. In 2013, the program was expanded to include an option in Spanish with leading cooperating institutions in Latin America and Spain.

== Postgraduate Programs ==
- Agroforestry and Sustainable Agriculture (Masters)
- Management and Conservancy of Tropical Forests and Biodiversity (Masters)
- Economy, Development and Climate Change (Masters)
- Integrated Watershed Management and Administration (Masters)
- Development Practice (Professional Masters)
- Conservancy Practice (Professional Masters)
- Sustainable Tourism (Professional Masters, is a joint degree between the University of North Texas (UNT) and CATIE)
- Sustainable and Resilient Coffee Growing

CATIE also have doctoral programs with Bangor University (Wales) and University of Idaho (USA)

== Sources ==
- Doctoral Studies Guide - CATIE
- "CATIE | Centro Agronómico Tropical de Investigación y Enseñanza". catie.ac.cr. Archived from the original on 2014-06-25.
