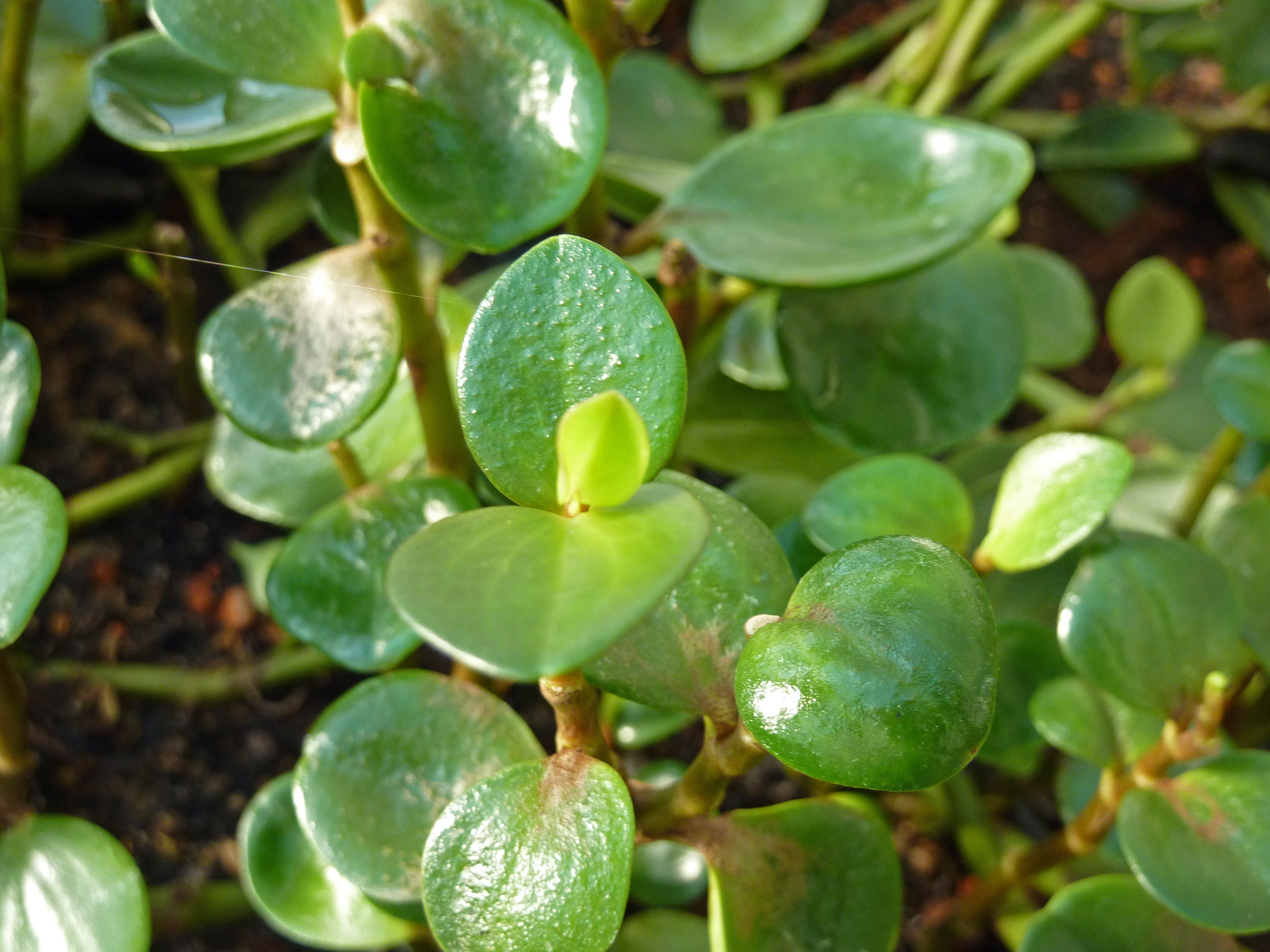

Scientific classification
- Kingdom: Plantae
- Clade: Embryophytes
- Clade: Tracheophytes
- Clade: Angiosperms
- Clade: Magnoliids
- Order: Piperales
- Family: Piperaceae
- Genus: Peperomia
- Species: P. tuisana

Binomial name
- Peperomia tuisana C.DC.

Synonyms
- Peperomia matapalo C.DC Peperomia pililimba Trel.

= Peperomia tuisana =

Species of plant

Peperomia tuisana is a species of perennial, lithophyte or epiphyte from the genus Peperomia. It was first described by Casimir de Candolle and published in the book "Anales del Instituto Físico-Geográfico y del Museo Nacional de Costa Rica 9: 176. 1896[1898] ". It primarily grows on wet tropical biomes. The species name came from Tuis, where first specimens of this species were collected.

== Distribution ==
It is endemic to Central and Mexico. First specimens were found at an altitude of 600 meters (2,000 ft) in Tuis.

- Belize
- Costa Rica
  - Limón
  - Cartago
  - Guanacaste
  - Alajuela
- El Salvador
  - Izalco
  - San Salvador
- Guatemala
  - Alta Verapaz
    - Senahú
    - Coban
- Honduras
  - Lempira
- Mexico
  - Chiapas
    - Villa Corzo
    - Ocosingo
    - La trinitaria
  - Veracruz
    - Tlaltetela
    - Zongolica
    - Jilotepec
  - Jalisco
  - Tabasco
- Nicaragua
