= Tatsuya Morita =

Japanese footballer

Tatsuya Morita 守田 達弥
Personal information
- Full name: Tatsuya Morita
- Date of birth: 3 August 1990 (age 36)
- Place of birth: Wakaba-ku, Chiba, Japan
- Height: 1.91 m (6 ft 3 in)
- Position: Goalkeeper

Team information
- Current team: Machida Zelvia
- Number: 13

Youth career
- Eagles
- –2005: FC Libereo
- 2006–2008: Narashino High School

Senior career*
Years	Team	Apps	(Gls)
2009–2012	Kyoto Sanga	13	(0)
2012–2013	Kataller Toyama	61	(0)
2014–2017	Albirex Niigata	106	(0)
2018–2019	Matsumoto Yamaga	70	(0)
2020–2022	Sagan Tosu	8	(0)
2022	→ Kashiwa Reysol (loan)	0	(0)
2023–2024	Kashiwa Reysol	6	(0)
2025–	Machida Zelvia	1	(0)

International career
2011	Japan U-22	1	(0)
Medal record
Kyoto Sanga FC
Runner-up	Emperor's Cup	2011
- * Club domestic league appearances and goals as of 9 August 2026

Tatsuya Morita (守田 達弥, Morita Tatsuya; born August 3, 1990 in Wakaba-ku, Chiba) is a Japanese footballer who plays as a goalkeeper for J1 League club, Machida Zelvia.

== Club career ==
Morita grew up in the Chiba Prefecture and began his professional career with Kyoto Sanga in the J. League in 2009. He made his debut on 11 September 2010, in a 3–0 win against Vissel Kobe.

Morita joined Kataller Toyama in June 2012 in a season-long loan deal. He made his debut in the 2–0 defeat by Roasso Kumamoto at Athletic Park on 24 June 2012.

He joined Albirex Niigata in December 2013, after the club sold Masaaki Higashiguchi to Gamba Osaka.

On 7 January 2025, Morita signed to J1 club, Machida Zelvia for 2025 season.

== International career ==
On 7 January 2011, Morita was named in the Japan under-22 squad for Middle East tour. He made his debut for the Japan Under-22 side on 10 February 2011 against the Kuwait senior team.

== Career statistics ==
=== Club ===
As of the start from 2025 season.

Club	Season	League			Emperor's Cup		J. League Cup		Total	
Club	Season	Division	Apps	Goals	Apps	Goals	Apps	Goals	Apps	Goals
Kyoto Sanga	2009	J.League Div 1	0	0	0	0	0	0	0	0
Kyoto Sanga	2010	J.League Div 1	13	0	1	0	0	0	14	0
Kyoto Sanga	2011	J.League Div 2	0	0	0	0	–		0	0
Kyoto Sanga	2012	J.League Div 2	0	0	0	0	–		0	0
Kataller Toyama	2012	J.League Div 2	22	0	1	0	–		23	0
Kataller Toyama	2013	J.League Div 2	39	0	1	0	–		40	0
Albirex Niigata	2014	J.League Div 1	34	0	2	0	6	0	42	0
Albirex Niigata	2015	J1 League	32	0	0	0	10	0	42	0
Albirex Niigata	2016	J1 League	30	0	2	0	1	0	33	0
Albirex Niigata	2017	J1 League	10	0	1	0	4	0	15	0
Matsumoto Yamaga	2018	J2 League	39	0	1	0	–		40	0
Matsumoto Yamaga	2019	J1 League	31	0	0	0	1	0	32	0
Sagan Tosu	2020	J1 League	8	0	0	0	1	0	9	0
Sagan Tosu	2021	J1 League	0	0	0	0	6	0	6	0
Sagan Tosu	2022	J1 League	0	0	0	0	0	0	0	0
Kashiwa Reysol (loan)	2022	J1 League	0	0	0	0	0	0	0	0
Kashiwa Reysol	2023	J1 League	3	0	2	0	2	0	7	0
Kashiwa Reysol	2024	J1 League	3	0	0	0	2	0	5	0
Machida Zelvia	2025	J1 League	0	0	0	0	0	0	0	0
Career total			264	0	11	0	33	0	308	0
