= National Route 413 (Costa Rica) =

National Road Route in Costa Rica

National Tertiary Route 413
- Ruta nacional terciaria 413

Route information
- Maintained by Ministry of Public Works and Transport
- Length: 20.795 km (12.921 mi)

Location
- Country: Costa Rica
- Provinces: Cartago

Highway system
- National Road Network of Costa Rica
← Route 411	→ Route 414

National Tertiary Route 413, or just Route 413 (Spanish: Ruta Nacional Terciaria 413, or Ruta 413) is a National Road Route of Costa Rica, located in the Cartago province.

== Description ==
In Cartago province the route covers Turrialba canton (La Suiza, Tres Equis districts).
