= National Route 232 (Costa Rica) =

National Road Route in Costa Rica

National Secondary Route 232
- Ruta nacional secundaria 232

Route information
- Maintained by Ministry of Public Works and Transport
- Length: 5.800 km (3.604 mi)

Location
- Country: Costa Rica
- Provinces: Cartago

Highway system
- National Road Network of Costa Rica
← Route 231	→ Route 233

National Secondary Route 232, or just Route 232 (Spanish: Ruta Nacional Secundaria 232, or Ruta 232) is a National Road Route of Costa Rica, located in the Cartago province.

== Description ==
In Cartago province the route covers Turrialba canton (La Suiza and Pavones districts).
