= La Isabel =

District in Turrialba canton, Cartago province, Costa Rica

- District
- Interactive map of La Isabel
- La Isabel district location in Costa Rica
- Coordinates: 9.9279657°N 83.6599722°W
- Country: Costa Rica
- Province: Cartago
- Canton: Turrialba
- Creation: 4 October 2001

Area
  - Total: 19.96 km^{2} (7.71 sq mi)
- Elevation: 630 m (2,070 ft)

Population (2011)
  - Total: 6,116
  - Density: 306.4/km^{2} (793.6/sq mi)
- Time zone: UTC−06:00
- Postal code: 30511

La Isabel is a district of the Turrialba canton, in the Cartago province of Costa Rica.

== History ==
La Isabel was created on 4 October 2001 by Ley 8150.

== Geography ==
La Isabel has an area of 19.96 km^{2} (7.71 sq mi) and an elevation of 630 metres.

== Demographics ==
Historical population
Census	Pop.	±% p.a.
2011	6,116	—
2022	6,649	+0.76%
Source: Instituto Nacional de Estadística y Censos; Centro Centroamericano de Población

For the 2011 census, La Isabel had a population of 6,116 inhabitants.

== Transportation ==
=== Road transportation ===
The district is covered by the following road routes:

- National Route 415
