= Santa Cruz District, Turrialba =

District in Turrialba canton, Cartago province, Costa Rica

Santa Cruz
- District
- Santa Cruz district
- Santa Cruz district location in Costa Rica
- Coordinates: 10.0103262°N 83.7545832°W
- Country: Costa Rica
- Province: Cartago
- Canton: Turrialba
- Creation: 14 February 1920

Area
  - Total: 124.94 km^{2} (48.24 sq mi)
- Elevation: 1,475 m (4,839 ft)

Population (2011)
  - Total: 3,208
  - Density: 25.68/km^{2} (66.50/sq mi)
- Time zone: UTC−06:00
- Postal code: 30504

Santa Cruz is a district of the Turrialba canton, in the Cartago province of Costa Rica.

== History ==
Santa Cruz was created on 14 February 1920 by Decreto 28, having been segregated from Alvarado canton.

== Geography ==
Santa Cruz has an area of 124.94 km^{2} and an elevation of 1,475 metres.

== Demographics ==
Historical population
Census	Pop.	±% p.a.
1927	1,644	—
1950	2,405	+1.67%
1963	3,193	+2.20%
1973	2,492	−2.45%
1984	2,659	+0.59%
2000	3,421	+1.59%
2011	3,208	−0.58%
2022	4,813	+3.76%
Source: Instituto Nacional de Estadística y Censos; Centro Centroamericano de Población

For the 2011 census, Santa Cruz had a population of 3,208 inhabitants.

== Transportation ==
=== Road transportation ===
The district is covered by the following road routes:

- National Route 230
- National Route 417

== Economy ==
=== Tourism ===
The Guayabo National Monument is located between this district and Santa Teresita district, both in Turrialba canton.

=== Dairy farms ===
The Turrialba cheese is originally from and produced in this district.
