= Oguradai Station =

Monorail station in Chiba, Japan

Coordinates: 35.6277°N 140.1719°E

CM13 Oguradai Station 小倉台駅
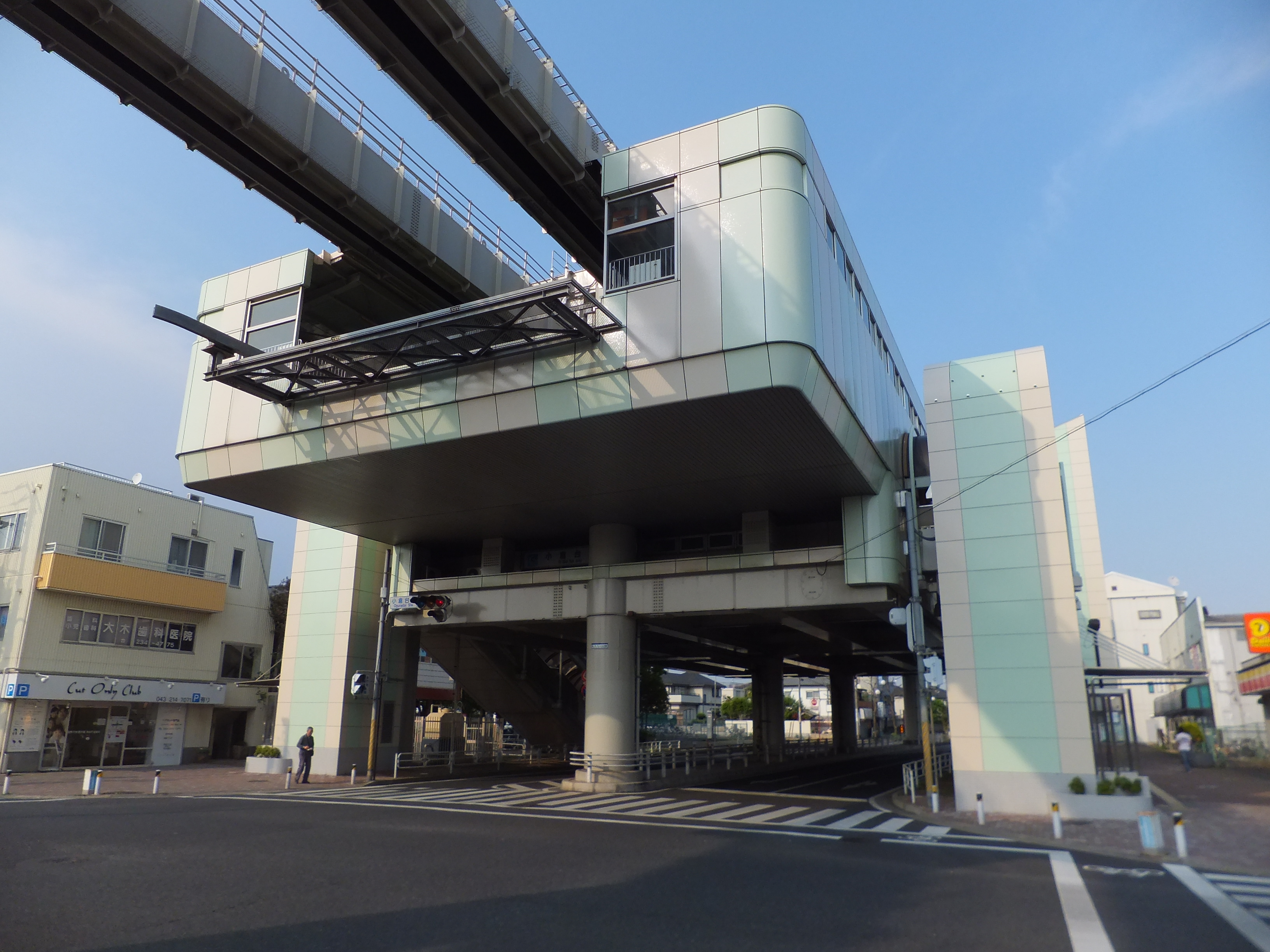
- Oguradai Station in May 2012

General information
- Location: 4-1731-1 Oguradai, Wakaba-ku, Chiba, Chiba Prefecture; Japan
- Operator: Chiba Urban Monorail
- Line: Chiba Urban Monorail Line 2

History
- Opened: March 28, 1988

Passengers
- FY2009: 1,329 daily

Services
Preceding station	Chiba Urban Monorail	Following station
Sakuragi CM12 towards Chiba	Line 2	Chishirodai-Kita CM14 towards Chishirodai
Location
- Location within Chiba Prefecture Location within Japan

Oguradai Station (小倉台駅, Oguradai-eki) is a monorail station on the Chiba Urban Monorail in Wakaba-ku in the city of Chiba, Chiba Prefecture, Japan. It is located 10.2 kilometers from the northern terminus of the line at Chiba Station.

== Lines ==
- Chiba Urban Monorail Line 2

== Layout ==
Oguradai Station is an elevated station with two opposed side platforms serving two tracks.

=== Platforms ===
1	■ Chiba Urban Monorail Line 2	for Chishirodai
2	■ Chiba Urban Monorail Line 2	for Tsuga, Chiba, and Chiba-Minato

== History ==
Oguradai Station opened on March 28, 1988.
