= National Route 414 (Costa Rica) =

National Road Route in Costa Rica

National Tertiary Route 414
- Ruta nacional terciaria 414

Route information
- Maintained by Ministry of Public Works and Transport
- Length: 29.340 km (18.231 mi)

Location
- Country: Costa Rica
- Provinces: Cartago

Highway system
- National Road Network of Costa Rica
← Route 413	→ Route 415

National Tertiary Route 414, or just Route 414 (Spanish: Ruta Nacional Terciaria 414, or Ruta 414) is a National Road Route of Costa Rica, located in the Cartago province.

== Description ==
In Cartago province the route covers Turrialba canton (La Suiza, Tuis, Tayutic, Chirripó districts).
