= Serpentario Viborana =

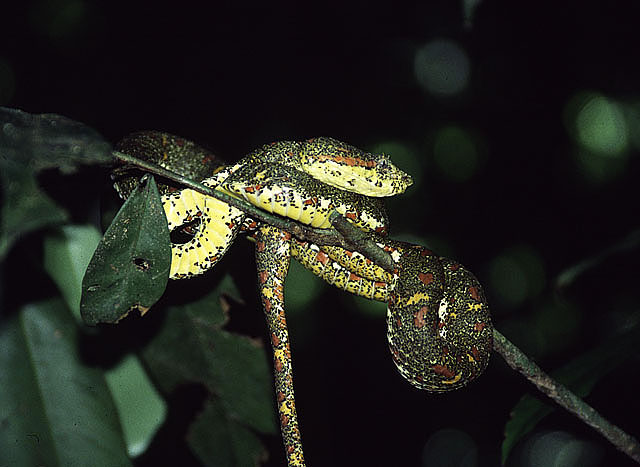
- Eyelash viper, one of the species in display at Serpentario Viborana
- Interactive map of Serpentario Viborana
- 9.9011586°N 83.6280386°W
- Date opened: 1994
- Location: Cartago Province; Costa Rica
- No. of animals: 50+

Project Vibroana (Spanish: Serpentario Viborana) is a privately operated serpentarium, rescue centre and environmental education facility located near Turrialba Volcano in the Cartago Province of Costa Rica. The centre is dedicated to the rehabilitation of mistreated, injured, orphaned, and/or confiscated snakes, focusing primarily on venomous species. Once the animals are fully rehabilitated, they are reintroduced into their natural habitats in protected areas, mainly in the Pacuare River primary forest. Visitors are permitted in the centre during certain times each day. The center was created and is run by Minor Camacho, a Costa Rican herpetologist. The educational guide explores the natural history and habitat of poisonous snakes more than their taxonomy.

The Viborana centre also doubles as a snake call centre, with the owner and staff going out to homes to remove venomous snakes from places where they might inconvenience people.

== History ==
Founded by Minor Camacho Loaiza, a former reptile handler, trained at the University of Costa Rica and former chief of the Herpetarium division of the Department of Biochemistry of that University. The centre began as a herpetarium exhibition for reptiles and amphibians. Inspired on research findings that suggested an increase in snake populations around the Pacurare River sugarcane landscapes, the herpetarium redirected its focus towards the study of the dynamics of the Natural History of snakes in the fields of Cartago.

== Exhibits ==
The centre is devoted to indigenous reptiles. Many are collected from local homes, yards, or from areas about to be burned under the controlled burning program to keep summer grass fires from threatening the local homes. Most of the reptiles end up being relocated to uninhabited areas.

Animals at the centre include the Bothrops lanceolatus — known as the fer-de-lance; Bothriechis schlegelii, the eyelash viper; large and small pythons, coral snakes, and rattlesnakes, among others.

== See also ==
- Serpentario de Monteverde
- List of zoos by country: Costa Rica zoos
