= National Route 415 (Costa Rica) =

National Road Route in Costa Rica

National Tertiary Route 415
- Ruta nacional terciaria 415

Route information
- Maintained by Ministry of Public Works and Transport
- Length: 49.195 km (30.568 mi)

Location
- Country: Costa Rica
- Provinces: Cartago, Limón

Highway system
- National Road Network of Costa Rica
← Route 414	→ Route 416

National Tertiary Route 415, or just Route 415 (Spanish: Ruta Nacional Terciaria 415, or Ruta 415) is a National Road Route of Costa Rica, located in the Cartago, Limón provinces.

== Description ==
In Cartago province the route covers Turrialba canton (Turrialba, Peralta, Santa Teresita, La Isabel districts).

In Limón province the route covers Siquirres canton (Florida, Germania, Alegría districts).
