= Turrialba (canton) =

Canton in Cartago province, Costa Rica

- Canton
- Flag
- Turrialba canton
- Turrialba canton location in Costa Rica
- Coordinates: 9.7809951°N 83.5686741°W
- Country: Costa Rica
- Province: Cartago
- Creation: 19 August 1903
- Head city: Turrialba
- Districts: Districts: Turrialba; La Suiza; Peralta; Santa Cruz; Santa Teresita; Pavones; Tuis; Tayutic; Santa Rosa; Tres Equis; La Isabel; Chirripó

Government
  - Type: Municipality
  - Body: Municipalidad de Turrialba

Area
  - Total: 1,642.67 km^{2} (634.24 sq mi)
- Elevation: 768 m (2,520 ft)

Population (2011)
  - Total: 69,616
  - Density: 42.380/km^{2} (109.76/sq mi)
- Time zone: UTC−06:00
- Canton code: 305
- Website: www.muniturrialba.go.cr/index.php/en/

Turrialba is a canton in the Cartago province of Costa Rica. The head city is in Turrialba district.

== History ==
Turrialba was created on 19 August 1903 by decree 84.

== Geography ==
Turrialba has an area of 1,642.67 km^{2} and a mean elevation of 768 metres.

Turrialba is the eleventh largest canton among the eighty two cantons that comprise Costa Rica. The Turrialba River and Atirro River establish major portions of the canton's western border, and the Chirripó River delineates its long southeastern border. The region is home to the active Turrialba Volcano.

== Districts ==
The canton of Turrialba is subdivided into the following districts:

1. Turrialba
2. La Suiza
3. Peralta
4. Santa Cruz
5. Santa Teresita
6. Pavones
7. Tuis
8. Tayutic
9. Santa Rosa
10. Tres Equis
11. La Isabel
12. Chirripó

== Demographics ==
Historical population
Census	Pop.	±% p.a.
1927	15,814	—
1950	24,466	+1.92%
1963	37,620	+3.37%
1973	43,202	+1.39%
1984	50,567	+1.44%
2000	68,510	+1.92%
2011	69,616	+0.15%
2022	82,065	+1.51%
Source: Instituto Nacional de Estadística y Censos; Centro Centroamericano de Población

For the 2011 census, Turrialba had a population of 69,616 inhabitants.

== Transportation ==
=== Road transportation ===
The canton is covered by the following road routes:

- National Route 10
- National Route 225
- National Route 230
- National Route 232
- National Route 411
- National Route 413
- National Route 414
- National Route 415
- National Route 417

== Economy ==
=== Tourism ===
Guayabo National Monument is a historic archaeological site located 18 km north of Turrialba city, it is located in the Santa Teresita and Santa Cruz districts of the canton. It is one of Costa Rica's only two pre-Columbian sites that is open to the public, together with the Stone Spheres Museum in the south of the country.

The Turrialba Volcano National Park is located in the canton, reopened after it was closed from 2012 to 2020 due to eruptions.

=== Dairy farms ===
The eponymous Turrialba cheese is produced in this region.

=== Bananas ===
Lower Turrialba is within Costa Rica's banana production zone and was important in the origin of United Fruit.
