= Dōbutsukōen Station =

Monorail station in Chiba, Japan

CM09 Dōbutsukōen Station 動物公園駅
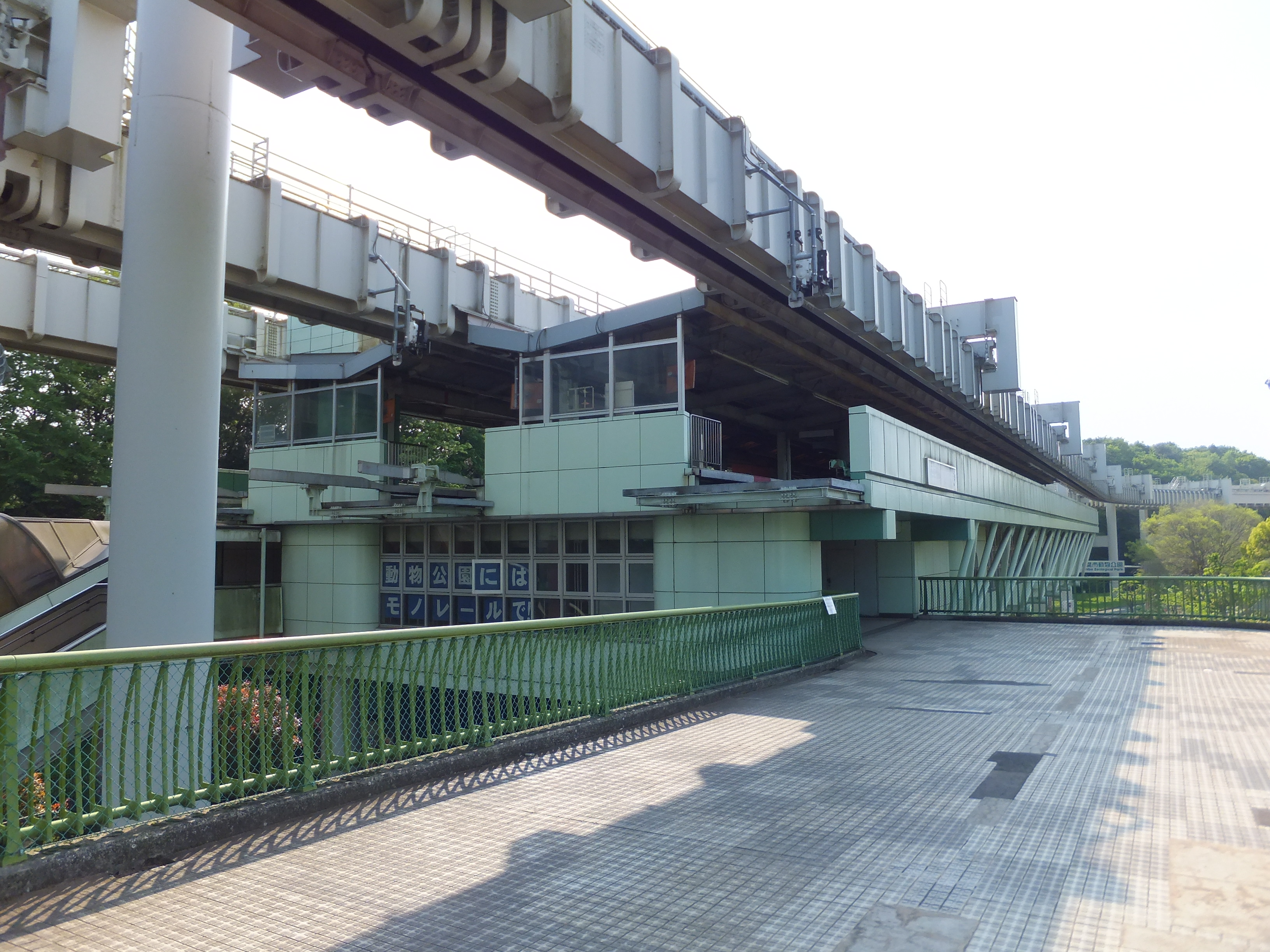
- Dōbutsukōen Station in May 2012

General information
- Location: 407-7 Minamoto-chō, Wakaba-ku, Chiba-shi, Chiba-ken; Japan
- Coordinates: 35°38′33.15″N 140°07′32.19″E
- Operator: Chiba Urban Monorail
- Line: Chiba Urban Monorail Line 2

History
- Opened: 28 March 1988

Passengers
- FY2009: 674 daily

Services
Preceding station	Chiba Urban Monorail	Following station
Sports Center CM08 towards Chiba	Line 2	Mitsuwadai CM10 towards Chishirodai
Location
- Location within Chiba Prefecture Location within Japan

Dōbutsukōen Station (動物公園駅, Dōbutsukōen-eki) is a monorail station on the Chiba Urban Monorail in Wakaba-ku in the city of Chiba, Chiba Prefecture, Japan. It is located 5.2 kilometers from the northern terminus of the line at Chiba Station.

== Lines ==
- Chiba Urban Monorail Line 2

== Layout ==
Dōbutsukōen Station is an elevated station with two opposed side platforms serving two tracks.

=== Platforms ===
1	■ Chiba Urban Monorail Line 2	for Tsuga and Chishirodai
2	■ Chiba Urban Monorail Line 2	for Chiba and Chiba-Minato

== History ==
Dōbutsukōen Station opened on March 28, 1988.

== See also ==
- List of railway stations in Japan
