= Turrialba cheese =

Cheese from Costa Rica

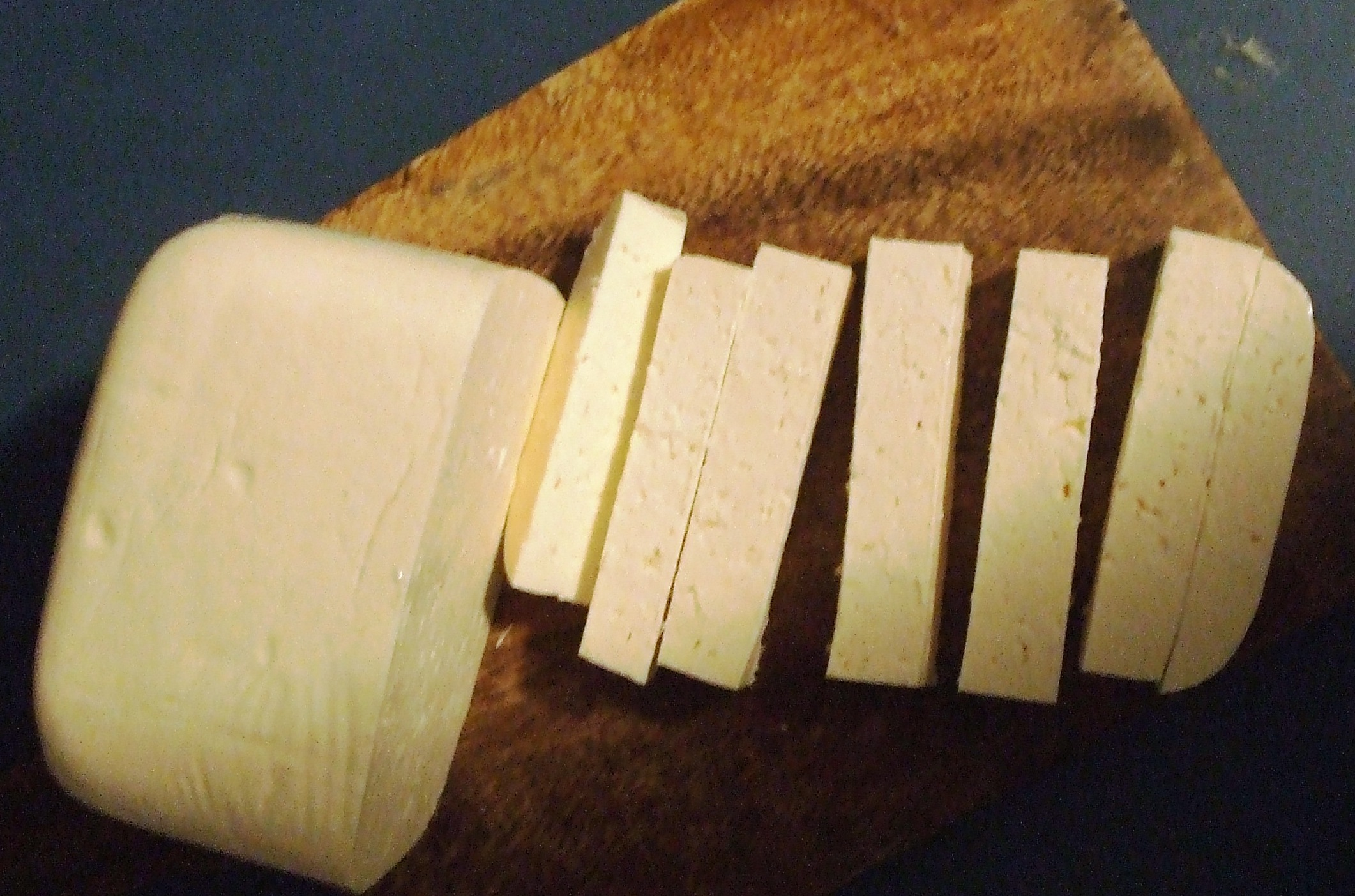
- Block and slices of Turrialba cheese
- Country of origin: Costa Rica
- Region: Turrialba canton
- Town: Santa Cruz district
- Source of milk: Cows milk

Turrialba cheese is a cow's milk cheese originally from Turrialba canton, in the Cartago Province of Costa Rica, it is origin protected since 2012.

== History ==
Production started in the 1870s when a Spanish family headed by Lucas Vargas came from La Mancha and settled in the region of Santa Cruz, in Turrialba, to start producing cheese with the recipes they brought from their homeland.

In the 1890s rail transportation between Turrialba and the capital of San José became possible, and the Vargas family started to ship their product to San José and Cartago in wooden crates.

In 1930 Florentino Castro, a coffee producer, acquired the Hacienda El Volcán. This was the first time in the country when cheese, butter and sour cream were produced and packaged with labels for further distribution throughout the country. In the 1950s, the cheese was exported for the first time to Chile and England, along with coffee.
