= Tuis District =

District in Turrialba canton, Cartago province, Costa Rica

Tuis
- District
- Tuis district
- Tuis district location in Costa Rica
- Coordinates: 9.840193°N 83.5608858°W
- Country: Costa Rica
- Province: Cartago
- Canton: Turrialba
- Creation: 11 June 1968

Area
  - Total: 38.88 km^{2} (15.01 sq mi)
- Elevation: 735 m (2,411 ft)

Population (2011)
  - Total: 2,837
  - Density: 72.97/km^{2} (189.0/sq mi)
- Time zone: UTC−06:00
- Postal code: 30507

Tuis is a district of the Turrialba canton, in the Cartago province of Costa Rica.

== History ==
Tuis was created on 11 June 1968 by Decreto Ejecutivo 20. Segregated from La Suiza.

== Geography ==
Tuis has an area of 38.88 km^{2} (15.01 sq mi) and an elevation of 735 metres.

== Demographics ==
Historical population
Census	Pop.	±% p.a.
1973	1,422	—
1984	2,106	+3.63%
2000	2,630	+1.40%
2011	2,837	+0.69%
2022	3,248	+1.24%
Source: Instituto Nacional de Estadística y Censos; Centro Centroamericano de Población

For the 2011 census, Tuis had a population of 2,837 inhabitants.

== Transportation ==
=== Road transportation ===
The district is covered by the following road routes:

- National Route 414
