= Guayabo National Monument =

Archaeological site in Costa Rica

- IUCN category III (natural monument or feature)
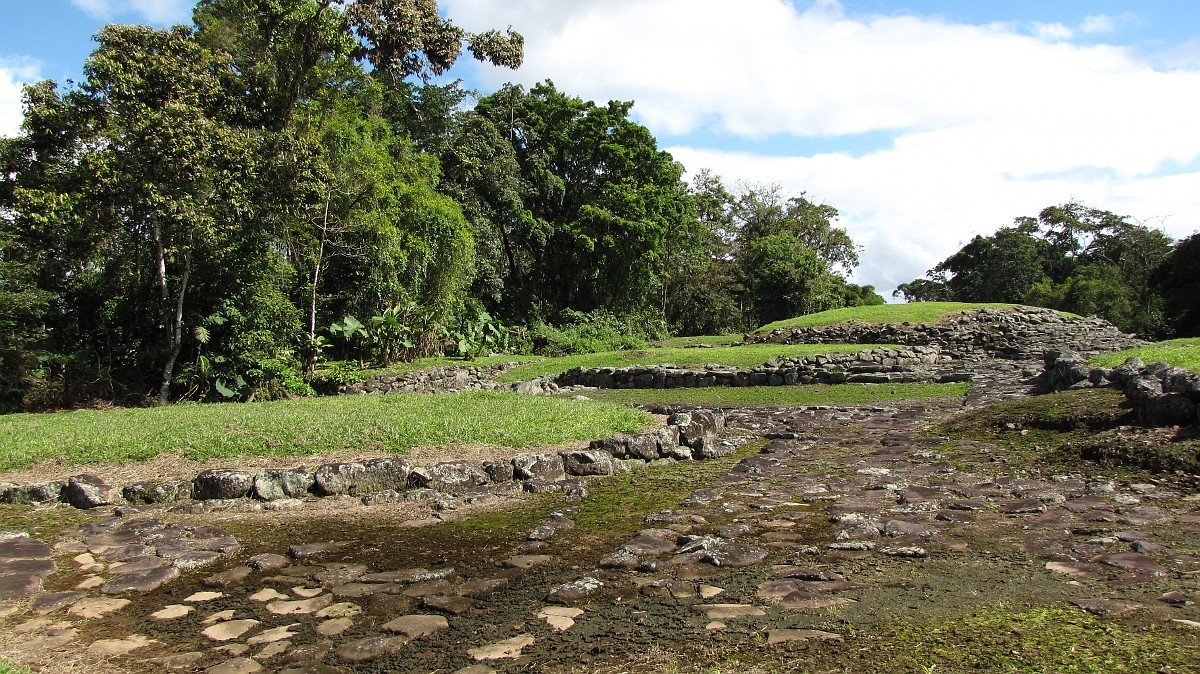
- Archaeological site within Guayabo

- Location within Costa Rica
- Location: Costa Rica
- Nearest city: Turrialba, Cartago
- Coordinates: 9°58′21.61″N 83°41′26.64″W
- Area: 2.3 square kilometres (0.89 sq mi)
- Established: 13 August 1973
- Governing body: National System of Conservation Areas (SINAC)

Guayabo National Monument (Spanish: Monumento Nacional Guayabo), is an archaeological site near the city of Turrialba, within the Central Conservation Area in the Cartago Province, Costa Rica. It is almost directly in the center of the country on the southern slope of the Turrialba Volcano. The National Monument covers about 2.3 square kilometres (0.89 sq mi) and is surrounded by rainforest plant vegetation causing it to be extremely vibrant green due to high precipitation and rich soils. Only a small portion of it has been unearthed, excavated, and studied.

== History ==
Guayabo de Turrialba seems to have been a locus of social power in the wake of the integration period. It was initially populated beginning in about 1000 BCE, and then abandoned in 1400 CE, a century before the Spanish arrived, for reasons that remain a mystery to researchers to this day. It has been estimated that there were about 10,000 residents at Guayabo. Believed to be the home of the Pre-Columbian people, this relic site was first discovered in the 1800s and was first excavated in the year 1882. The site consists of the city's infrastructure, petroglyphs, tombs, and artifacts that were left behind and found by archaeologists in the 1960s during further excavations. The magnitude of the known part of the site, presumed to be its central portion, consists of 43 stone foundations, three aqueducts, two major roadways, dozens of smaller paths, and stone tombs. The people of Guayabo were known to be aware of principles of engineering, which can be assumed by their use of aqueducts. Most of the site consists of circular mounds that conical wooden structures that were once built on. The villagers used to live in huge communal-like conical houses with thatched roofs with their family members. Mound 1 in particular stands out as the largest example of this culture, and is located in the center of the village. One of the most impressive finds at the site is a paved road which begins in front of Mound 1, and which connected to surrounding settlements as far as 9 km away. That is considered the most impressive finding at the site. Architecturally, the main building likely served as both a symbol as well as a place to conduct public business. After ascending the stairs next to the center mound, visitors would have been greeted by a pair of matching rectangular structures. As these structures flank the road, they were likely guardhouses which would have controlled access to the settlement. Many of the artifacts such as stones and petroglyphs found when excavating the site represented animals such as jaguars and lizards. The function of the petroglyphs is still unknown, but many assume that they were decoration. Tools have been found which suggest that the Guayabo people were dedicated to growing crops, mainly consisting of roots such as yucca. Studies have shown that while the people of Guayabo did most of their own work, there is data suggesting slavery may have been practiced.

== Excavations and Visiting the Site Today ==
Following an 1891 excavation of a cemetery, over 100 artifacts were displayed at the 1892 Historical American Exposition in Madrid and then much of the display was taken to the 1893 World's Columbian Exposition in Chicago, Illinois. The explorers who excavated this site include Anastacio Alfaro, Carlos Aguilar, Oscar Fonseca, and Sergio Chávez. There have been studies done on Guayabo that use today's technologies, such as one recent study using remote sensing techniques to detect and map the roads in the region. As of 2020, no studies conducted using LIDAR have been made. In 2009, Guayabo was declared an "International Historic Civil Engineering Landmark" by the American Society of Civil Engineers because its roads, walls, and water channels represent remarkable civil engineering achievements by a pre-Columbian civilization. The site is open to the public daily and is a tourist attraction. It has been open to the public since August 13, 1973. One can hike around the trails and observe the structures or tour it with a professional guide. This is a popular destination to visit because although Guayabo is similar to other excavated sites such as Machu Picchu, Chichen Itza, and other South American and Central American ruins in the sense that the artifacts and structures that can be found look similar, it draws the public in due to the mystery of why it was abandoned, and the fact that there is still a big portion of it that has not yet been excavated. It is also sought out by people because of its remoteness in the rainforest.

== Current State ==
The current state of the structure is in good shape. Everything has been preserved well and kept as authentic as possible. It is now protected within the Guayabo National Monument and is also a part of the Central Volcanic Conservation Area. Keeping this site clean and authentic is a big priority to the people of Costa Rica especially those Costa Ricans who live near it not only because it brings in tourism but they also really value the environment. It also helps that unlike other sites such as Machu Picchu where it gets over half a million visitors each year, Guayabo de Turrialba does not receive nearly as many visitors because it is not as popular so it is easier to maintain. There are measures being taken to make sure it stays in the condition it is in today and stays the same in the future.

== Gallery ==
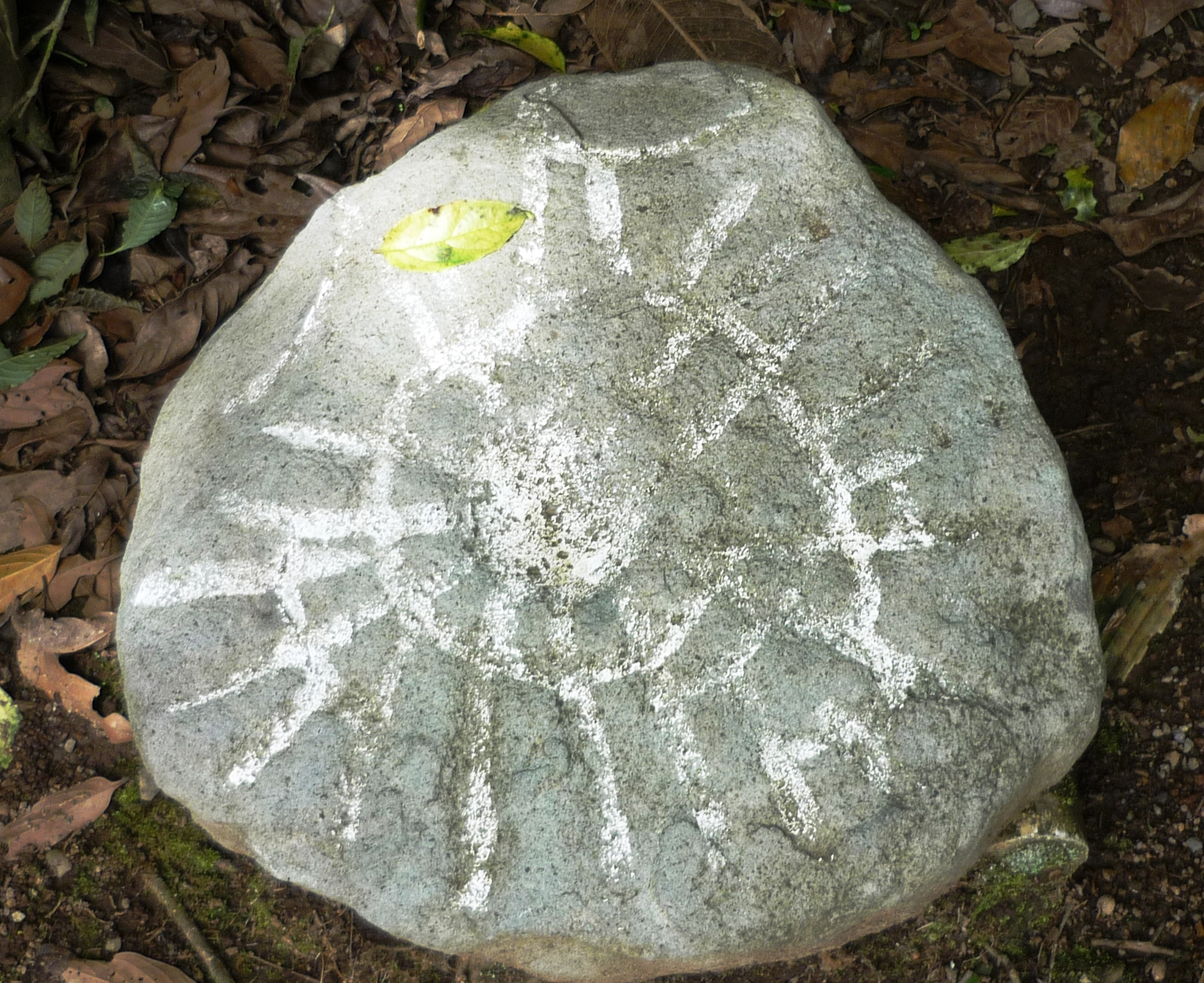

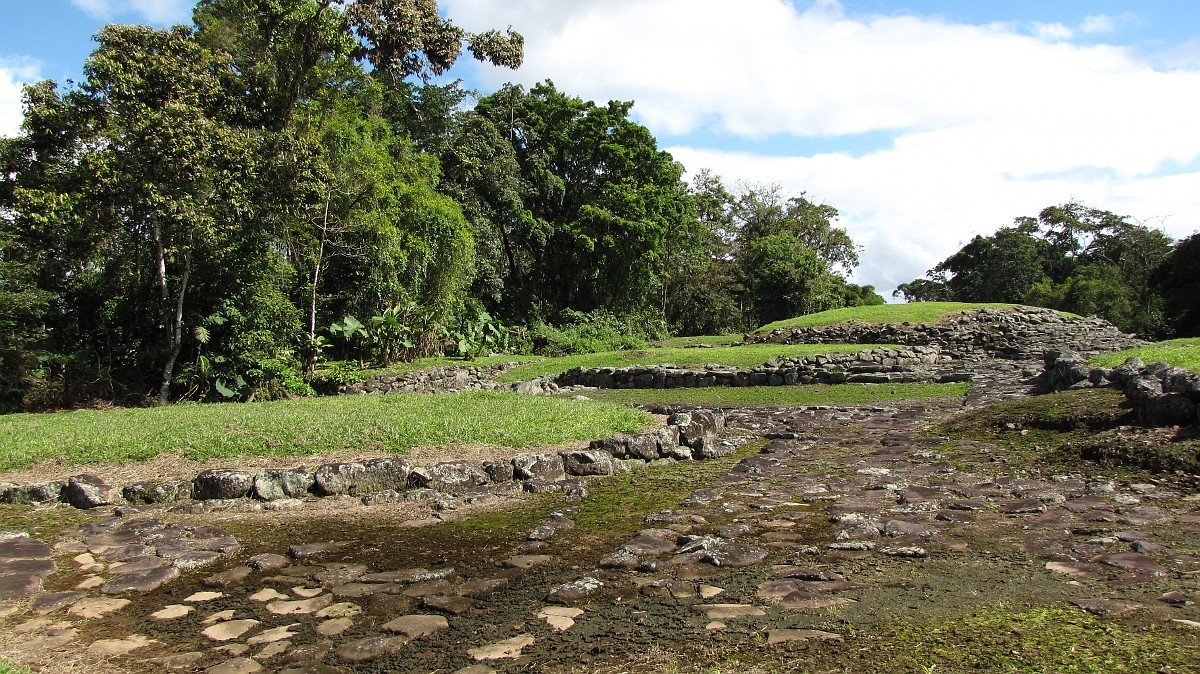

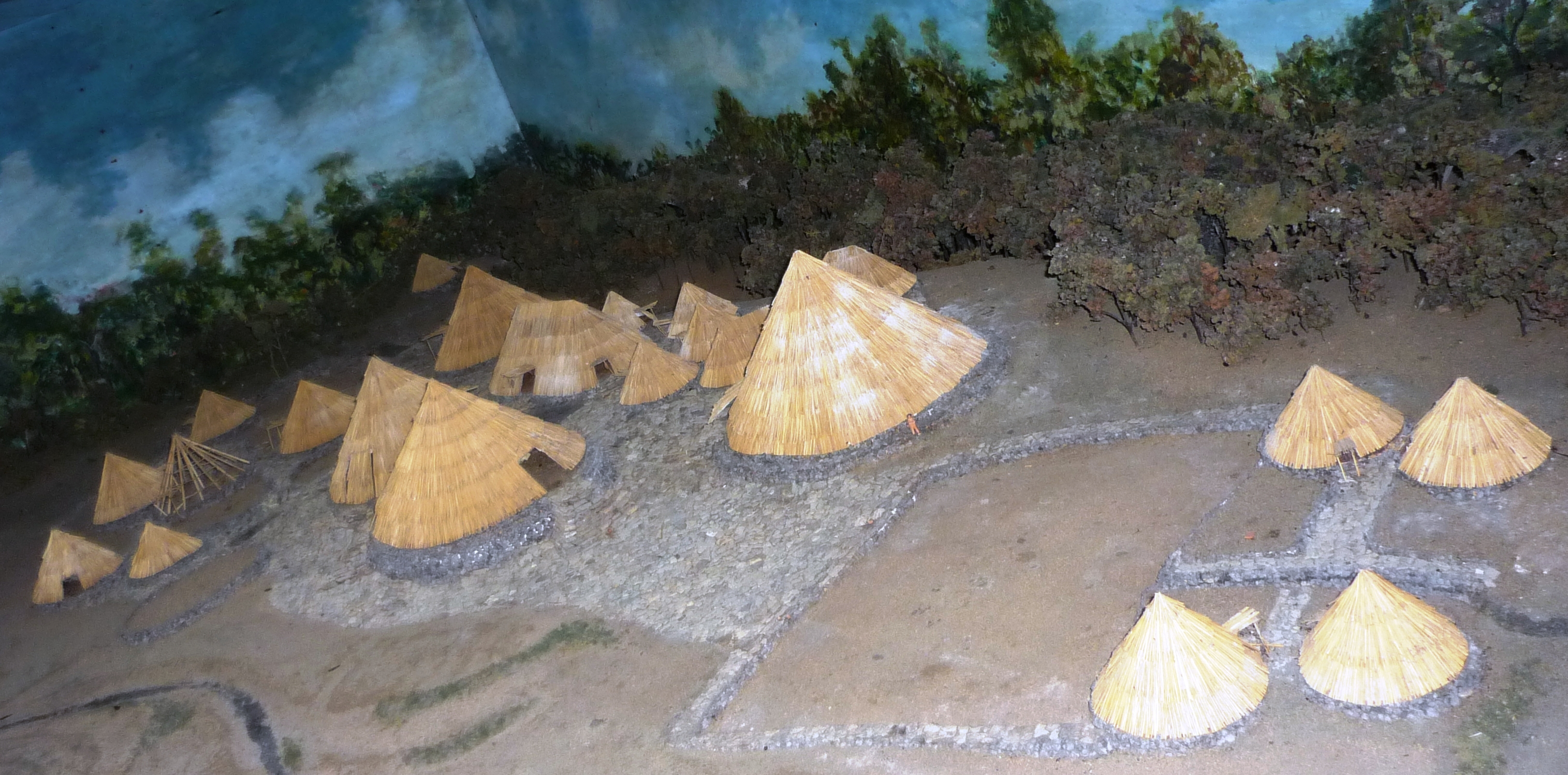

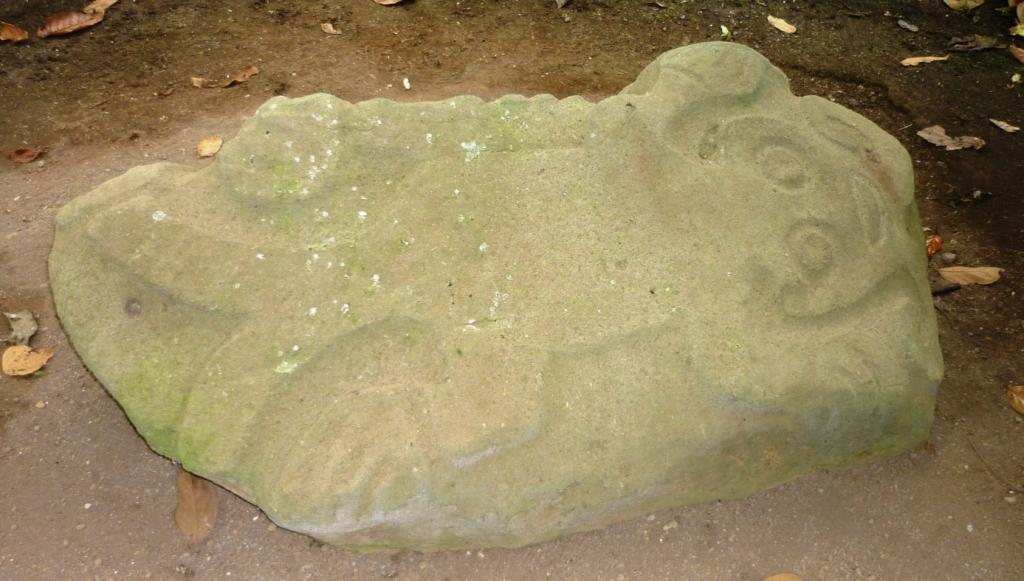

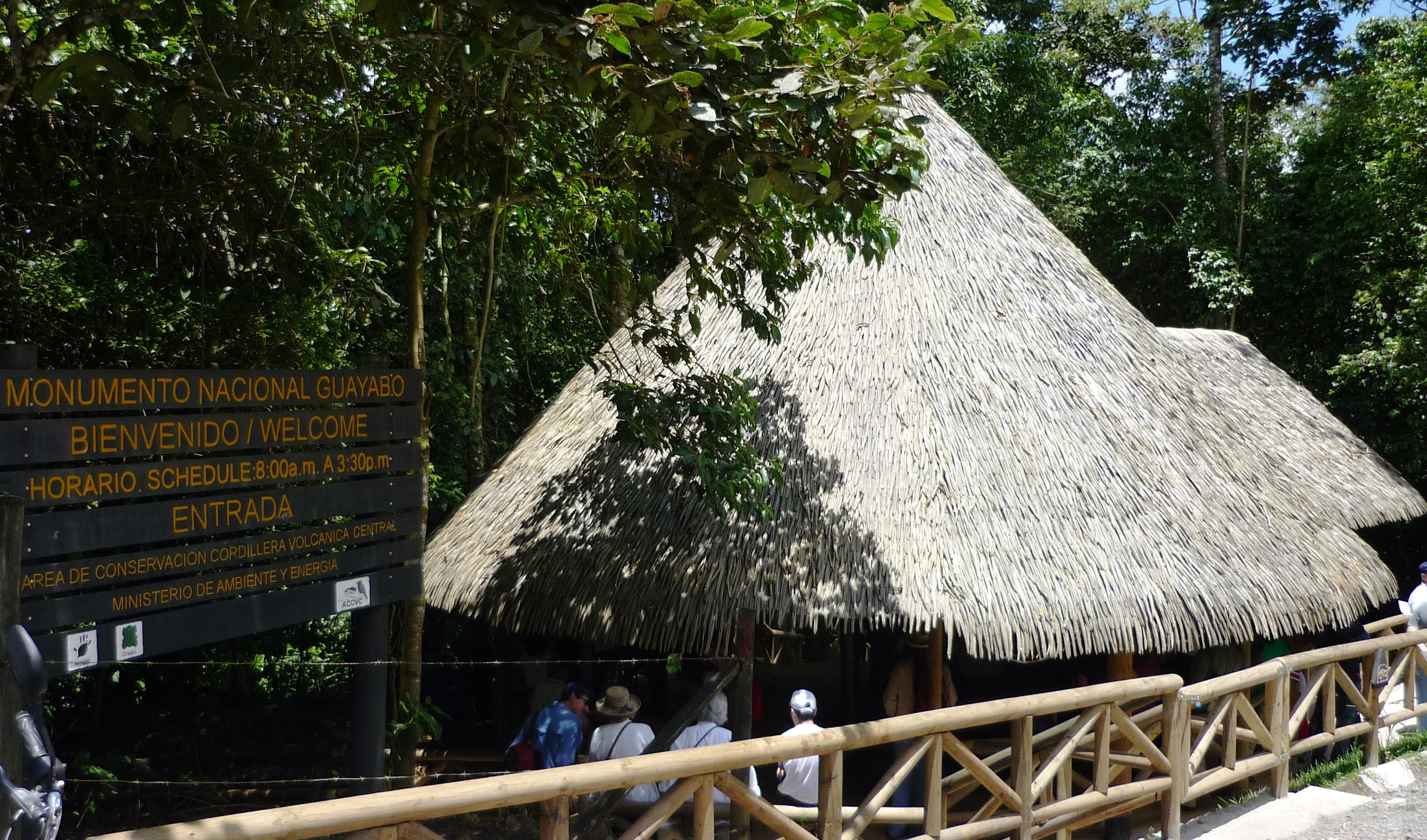

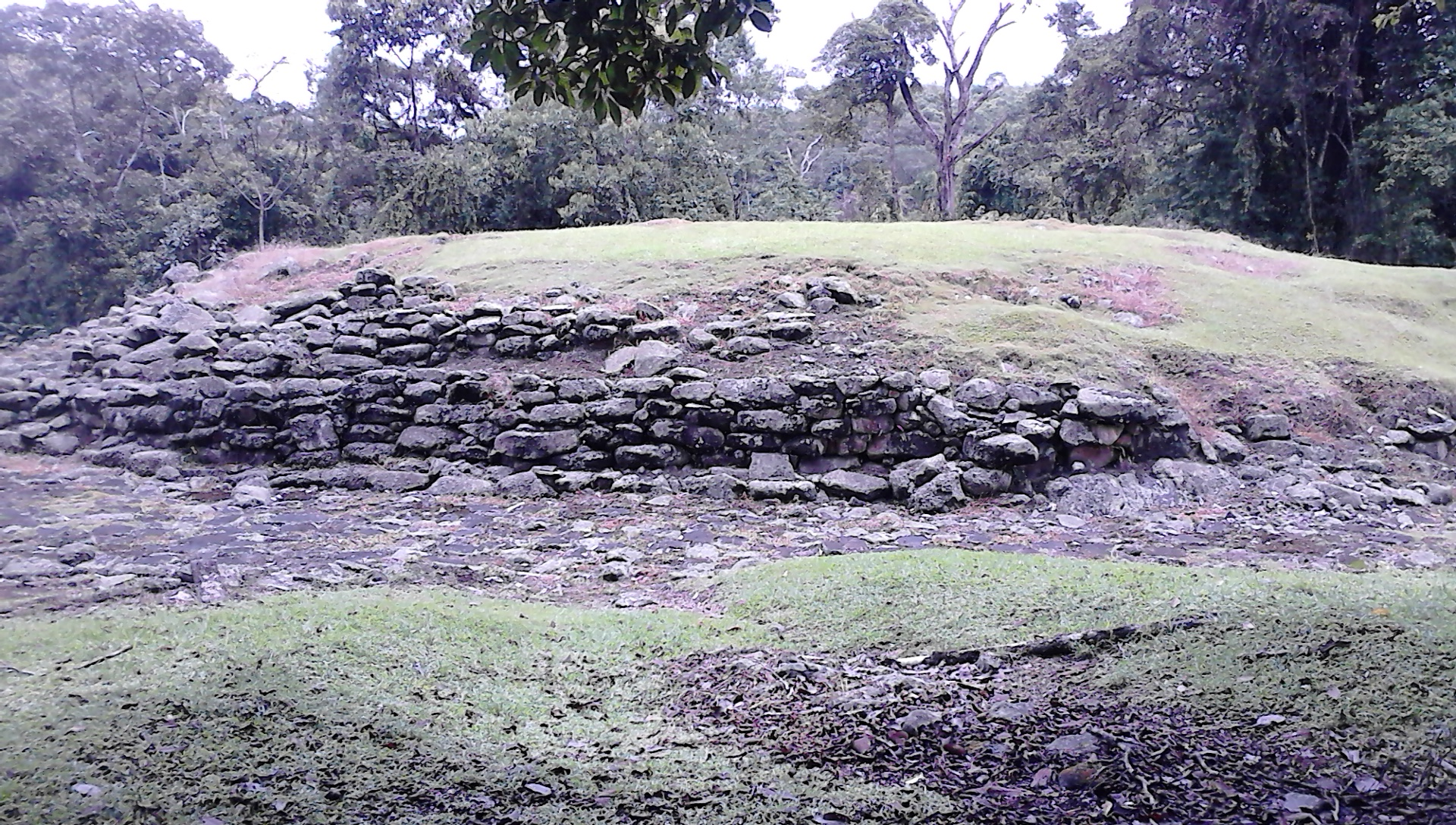
