= Uekusa Gakuen Junior College =

Private coeducational junior college

Coordinates: 35°40′13.34″N 140°07′12.31″E

- 植草学園短期大学; Uekusa gakuen tanki daigaku
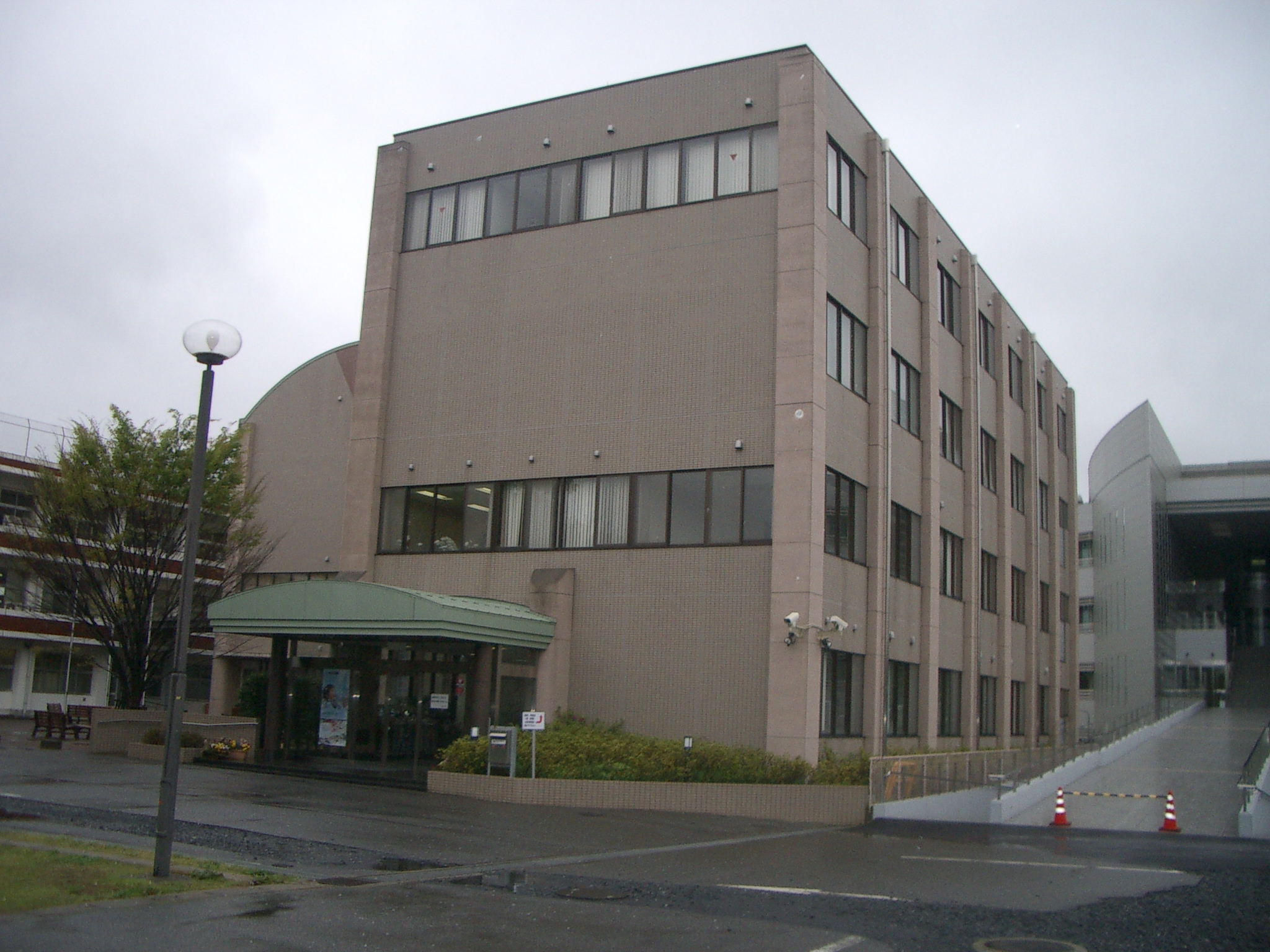
- Type: Private
- Established: 1999
- Location: Wakaba-ku, Chiba, Chiba, Japan
- Website: Official website

Uekusa Gakuen Junior College (植草学園短期大学, Uekusa gakuen tanki daigaku) is a private coeducational junior college in the city of Wakaba-ku, Chiba, Chiba Prefecture Japan, established in 1999.

== Names of Academic department ==
- Regional welfare
  - Major of Personal care studies
  - Major of Special education studies

== Advanced course ==
- Major of Parsonal care studies
- Major of Special education studies
