= Tokyo University of Information Sciences =

Coordinates: 35°38′15.07″N 140°12′12.49″E

- 東京情報大学; Tōkyō Jōhō Daigaku
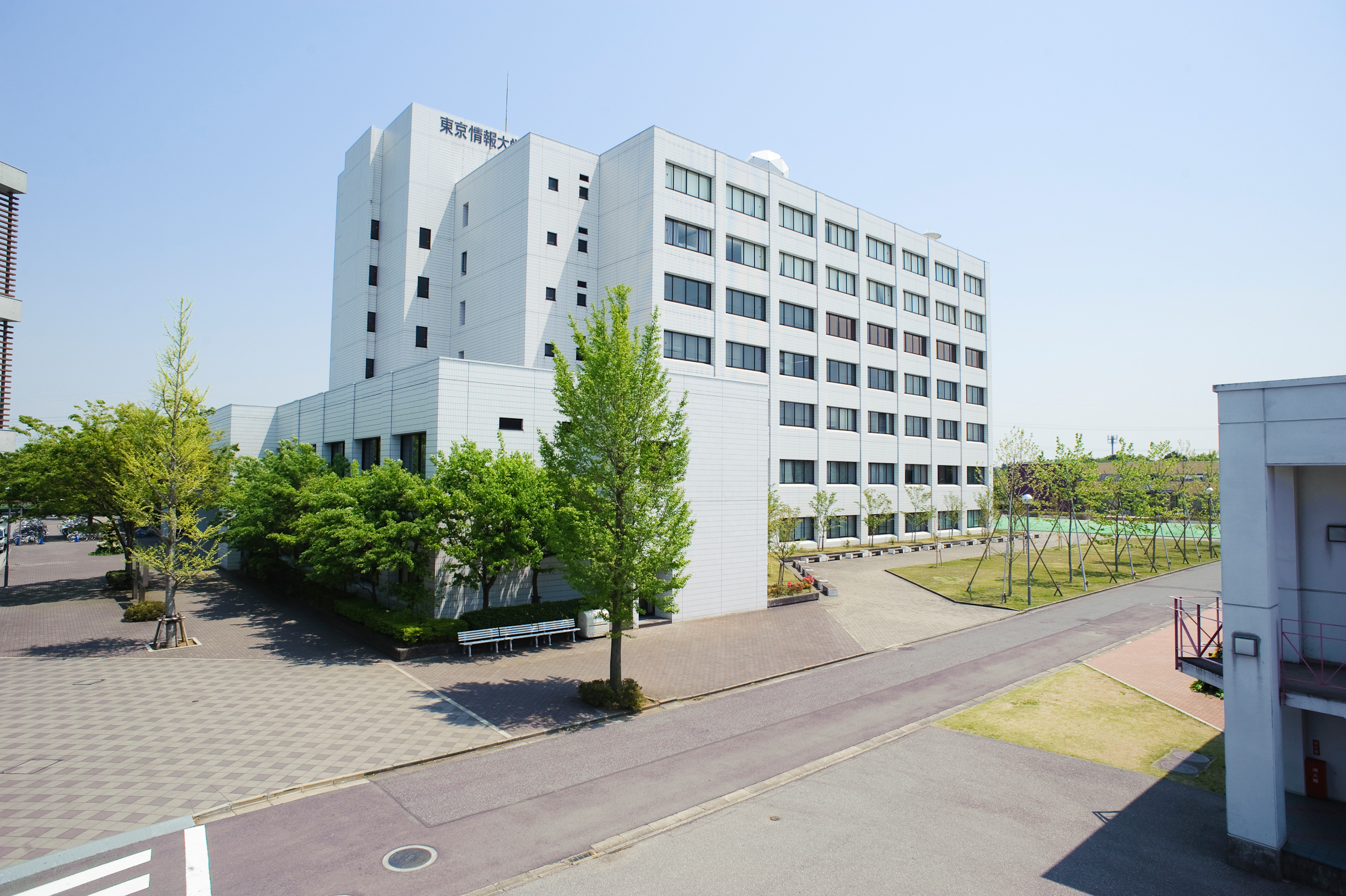
- Type: Private
- Established: 1988
- Location: Wakaba-ku, Chiba, Chiba, Japan
- Website: Official website

Tokyo University of Information Sciences (東京情報大学, Tōkyō Jōhō Daigaku) is a private university in Wakaba Ward of the city of Chiba, Chiba Prefecture, Japan. The university was established in 1988 by the School corporation Tokyo University of Agriculture. The university consists of four departments: Information System, Environmental Information, Business & Information, and Media & Cultural Studies.
