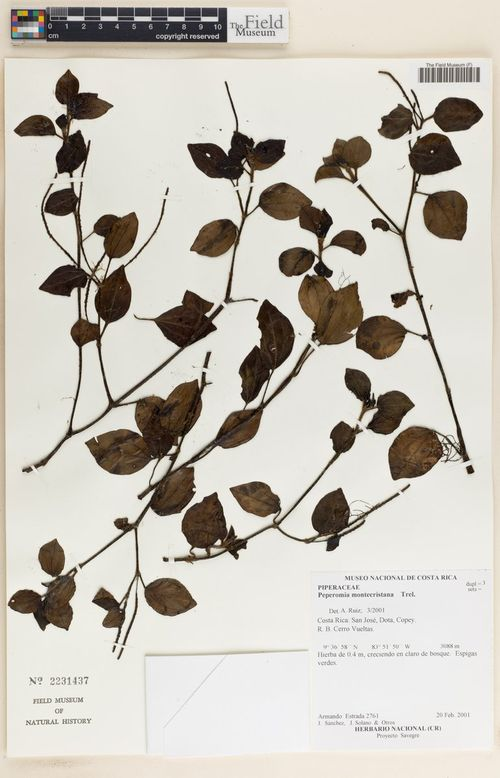

Scientific classification
- Kingdom: Plantae
- Clade: Tracheophytes
- Clade: Angiosperms
- Clade: Magnoliids
- Order: Piperales
- Family: Piperaceae
- Genus: Peperomia
- Species: P. montecristana

Binomial name
- Peperomia montecristana Trel.

Synonyms
- Peperomia subdita Trel.

= Peperomia montecristana =

Species of plant

Peperomia montecristana is a species of epiphyte in the genus Peperomia that is endemic in Costa Rica, Nicaragua, and Panama. It grows on wet tropical biomes. Its conservation status is Not Threatened.

== Description ==
The type specimen was collected in Finca Montecristo, Costa Rica, at an altitude of 25 meters (82 ft).

Peperomia montecristana is a small, somewhat tufted herb that grows on trees. The stem is slender at 1 millimeter thick and loosely covered with long, woolly hairs. The leaves are alternate, either ovate or elliptic-ovate, with a bluntly pointed tip and a rounded base. They are rather small at 1.5 by 2 to 2 by 4 centimeters, with 5 nerves. The leaves have pressed-down hairs, especially on the paler lower side, and dry to a green, membranous texture. The petiole is short at 5 to 10 millimeters long. The spikes are terminal, measuring 1 by 30 to 50 millimeters, with loosely spaced flowers. The peduncle is scarcely 5 millimeters long and covered with woolly, straight hairs. The floral bracts are round and shield-shaped (peltate), thin and large. The ovary is immersed, ovoid, and has a small shield-like structure called a scutulum. The stigma is positioned at the front on the scutulum.

== Taxonomy and naming ==
It was described in 1929 by William Trelease in Contributions from the United States National Herbarium 6. The epithet montecristana refers to where the type specimen was collected.

== Distribution and habitat ==
It is endemic in Costa Rica, Nicaragua, and Panama. It grows as an epiphyte and is a herb. It grows on wet tropical biomes.

== Conservation ==
This species is assessed as Threatened.
