= Turrialba Volcano National Park =

National park in Costa Rica

- IUCN category II (national park)
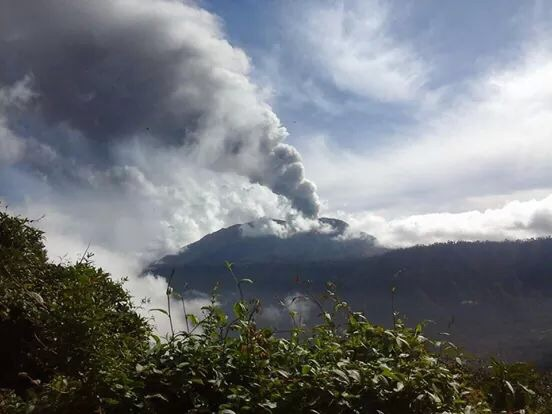
- Turrialba Volcano
- Turrialba Volcano National Park area.
- Location: Costa Rica
- Coordinates: 10°1′48″N 83°46′12″W
- Area: ~3,900 acres (16 km²)
- Established: 30 July 1955
- Governing body: National System of Conservation Areas (SINAC)
- Location in Costa Rica

Turrialba Volcano National Park, or in Spanish the Parque Nacional Volcan Turrialba is a national park in the Central Conservation Area of Costa Rica that encompasses the area around the Turrialba Volcano in Cartago Province.

Major eruptions in the past have occurred in the years between 1864 and 1868. Volcanism increased in the park starting in 2014 and has featured ash clouds that have repeatedly impacted portions of Costa Rica with deposits of gritty soot and caused temporary closures of Juan Santamaría International Airport in the capital city of San Jose.

== Tourism ==
Besides the views of the crater, it is possible to see the Caribbean plains, Turrialba valley and Talamanca mountain range. There are eighty four species of birds and eleven species of mammals in the park.

A moderate to high difficulty hike is available to tourists, a previous phone reservation is required, the entry fee is set as CRC ₡1000 for residents and USD $12 for foreigners, and there is now a mandatory tour group guide fee of CRC ₡6000.

Tours start from 06:00 AM to 10:00 AM.

=== 2012—2020 Closure ===
Due to eruptions, the park was closed to tourists from 2012, and reopened on 4 December 2020. Meanwhile, new emergency shelters were created, the visitor center was renovated, and railings at lookout spots were added. A two kilometer perimeter closure around the crater is still in place.

=== Access ===
The main access is through Route 417, however as of December 2020 there is a conflict of interests between the owners of a farm, who want to declare the route private, and the government, so an alternative route is signaled along the way.
