= Peralta District =

District in Turrialba canton, Cartago province, Costa Rica

Peralta
- District
- Peralta district
- Peralta district location in Costa Rica
- Coordinates: 9.9700079°N 83.6180846°W
- Country: Costa Rica
- Province: Cartago
- Canton: Turrialba

Area
  - Total: 9.53 km^{2} (3.68 sq mi)
- Elevation: 390 m (1,280 ft)

Population (2011)
  - Total: 511
  - Density: 53.6/km^{2} (139/sq mi)
- Time zone: UTC−06:00
- Postal code: 30503

Peralta is a district of the Turrialba canton, in the Cartago province of Costa Rica.

== Geography ==
Peralta has an area of 9.53 km^{2} (3.68 sq mi) and an elevation of 390 metres.

== Demographics ==
Historical population
Census	Pop.	±% p.a.
1927	2,050	—
1950	3,393	+2.21%
1963	6,236	+4.79%
1973	1,708	−12.15%
1984	1,883	+0.89%
2000	570	−7.20%
2011	511	−0.99%
2022	751	+3.56%
Source: Instituto Nacional de Estadística y Censos; Centro Centroamericano de Población

For the 2011 census, Peralta had a population of 511 inhabitants.

== Transportation ==
=== Road transportation ===
The district is covered by the following road routes:

- National Route 415
