= Uekusa University =

Coordinates: 35°38′04.18″N 140°10′56.81″E

Uekusa Gakuen University
- 植草学園大学; Uekusa Gakuen Daigaku
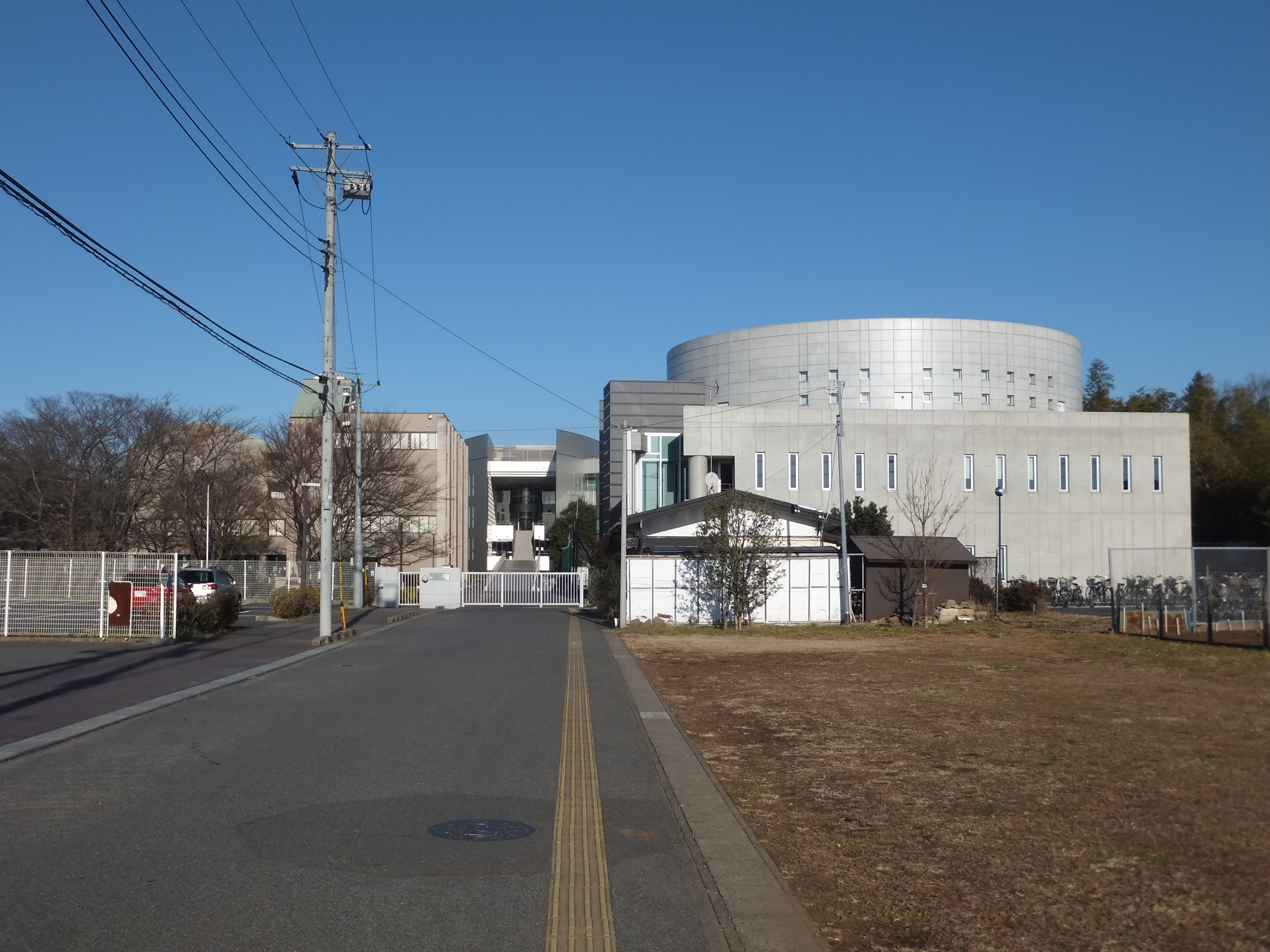
- Type: Private
- Established: 2008
- Location: Chiba, Chiba, Japan
- Website: Official website

Uekusa Gakuen University (植草学園大学, Uekusa Gakuen Daigaku) is a private university in the city of Chiba, Chiba Prefecture Japan, established in 2008. The operator of the university also operates a junior college called Uekusa Gakuen Junior College.
