= Turrialba (district) =

District in Turrialba canton, Cartago province, Costa Rica

- District
- Turrialba district
- Turrialba district location in Costa Rica
- Coordinates: 9.8897121°N 83.6806611°W
- Country: Costa Rica
- Province: Cartago
- Canton: Turrialba

Area
  - Total: 56.1 km^{2} (21.7 sq mi)
- Elevation: 646 m (2,119 ft)

Population (2011)
  - Total: 26,680
  - Density: 476/km^{2} (1,230/sq mi)
- Time zone: UTC−06:00
- Postal code: 30501
- Climate: Af

Turrialba is a district of the Turrialba canton, in the Cartago province of Costa Rica.

== Geography ==
Turrialba has an area of 56.1 km^{2} and an elevation of 646 metres.

=== Climate ===
Climate data for Turrialba (1961–1996)
Month	Jan	Feb	Mar	Apr	May	Jun	Jul	Aug	Sep	Oct	Nov	Dec	Year
Mean daily maximum °C (°F)	25.7 (78.3)	26.1 (79.0)	26.9 (80.4)	27.4 (81.3)	27.9 (82.2)	27.7 (81.9)	27.2 (81.0)	27.5 (81.5)	27.9 (82.2)	27.5 (81.5)	26.6 (79.9)	27.5 (81.5)	27.2 (80.9)
Mean daily minimum °C (°F)	16.5 (61.7)	16.4 (61.5)	17.2 (63.0)	18.0 (64.4)	18.8 (65.8)	18.9 (66.0)	18.8 (65.8)	18.6 (65.5)	18.7 (65.7)	18.5 (65.3)	18.3 (64.9)	18.6 (65.5)	18.1 (64.6)
Average precipitation mm (inches)	171.5 (6.75)	145.5 (5.73)	85.6 (3.37)	120.2 (4.73)	232.6 (9.16)	276.3 (10.88)	271.2 (10.68)	250.7 (9.87)	251.6 (9.91)	251.4 (9.90)	262.1 (10.32)	287.1 (11.30)	2,605.8 (102.6)
Source: World Meteorological Organization

== Demographics ==
Historical population
Census	Pop.	±% p.a.
1864	776	—
1883	869	+0.60%
1927	9,095	+5.48%
1950	13,584	+1.76%
1963	19,932	+2.99%
1973	18,873	−0.54%
1984	23,705	+2.09%
2000	32,004	+1.89%
2011	26,680	−1.64%
2022	29,620	+0.95%
Source: Instituto Nacional de Estadística y Censos; Centro Centroamericano de Población

For the 2011 census, Turrialba had a population of 26,680 inhabitants.

== Transportation ==
=== Road transportation ===
The district is covered by the following road routes:

- National Route 10
- National Route 230
- National Route 411
- National Route 415

== Economy ==
The main industries are textiles, agriculture, and tourism. The Pacuare and Reventazón Rivers are notable for whitewater rafting, making Turrialba a mecca for the sport.

"Several cities developed and prospered as a result of the building of the railroad to the Caribbean; Turrialba is one of these, and its architectural, spatial and ethnic makeup is different from other towns. Declared a City of National Archeological Interest, this town is the entryway to the Costa Rican Caribbean.

Turrialba’s outskirts contain appealing rural communities such as Santa Cruz, where homemade Turrialba cheese is produced, La Suiza and Aquiares, as well as the rapids of the Reventazón and Pacuare rivers." Serpentario Viborana, a snake rehabilitation center, is also located in Turrialba.

=== Baseball factory ===
The town is also home to the only official Major League baseball factory, moved there from Haiti by Rawlings in the late 1980s. This factory is a major employer in an otherwise exclusively farming economy.

== Education and Research ==
Two universities are located here: the Tropical Agronomy Research and Learning Centre (CATIE), of international influence, and the University of Costa Rica.

== Sports ==
The town's football club is Turrialba FC, who have spent several seasons in the Costa Rican Primera División. They play their home games at the Estadio Rafael Ángel Camacho.
