= La Suiza District =

District in Turrialba canton, Cartago province, Costa Rica

La Suiza
- District
- Interactive map of La Suiza
- La Suiza district location in Costa Rica
- Coordinates: 9.7640221°N 83.6069215°W
- Country: Costa Rica
- Province: Cartago
- Canton: Turrialba

Area
  - Total: 160.36 km^{2} (61.92 sq mi)
- Elevation: 616 m (2,021 ft)

Population (2011)
  - Total: 7,590
  - Density: 47.3/km^{2} (123/sq mi)
- Time zone: UTC−06:00
- Postal code: 30502

La Suiza is a district of the Turrialba canton, in the Cartago province of Costa Rica.

== Geography ==
La Suiza has an area of 160.36 km^{2} and an elevation of 616 metres.

== Demographics ==
Historical population
Census	Pop.	±% p.a.
1927	3,025	—
1950	5,084	+2.28%
1963	8,259	+3.80%
1973	5,381	−4.19%
1984	6,416	+1.61%
2000	9,202	+2.28%
2011	7,590	−1.74%
2022	8,821	+1.38%
Source: Instituto Nacional de Estadística y Censos; Centro Centroamericano de Población

For the 2011 census, La Suiza had a population of 7,590 inhabitants.

== Transportation ==
=== Road transportation ===
The district is covered by the following road routes:

- National Route 225
- National Route 232
- National Route 413
- National Route 414
