= Turrialba Volcano =

Volcano in central Costa Rica

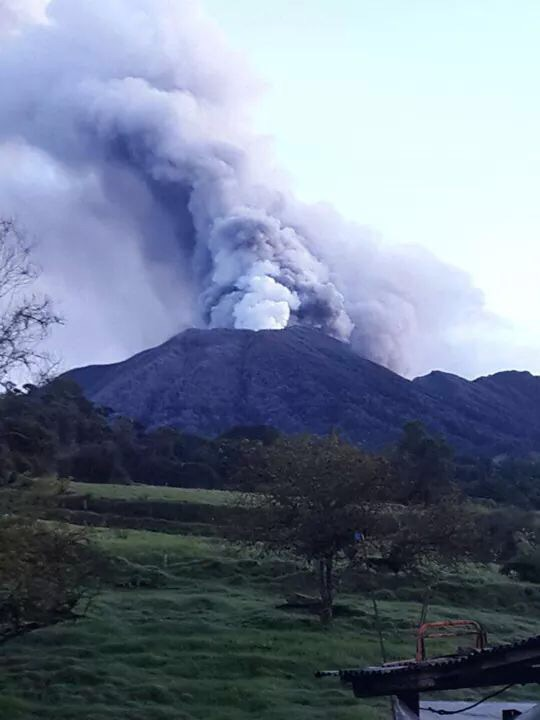
- Turrialba volcano while in eruption, October 2014

Highest point
- Elevation: 3,340 metres (10,958 ft)
- Coordinates: 10°1′5″N 83°45′50″W

Geography
- Location within Costa Rica
- Location: Cartago, Costa Rica
- Parent range: Cordillera Central

Geology
- Rock age: 1.5 million years
- Mountain type: Stratovolcano
- Volcanic arc: Central America Volcanic Arc
- Last eruption: 2022

Climbing
- Easiest route: hike

Turrialba Volcano is an active volcano in central Costa Rica that has been eruptive in recent years including 2016 and in January, March, and April 2017. Visitors used to be able to hike down into the main crater, but increased volcanic activity in 2014–17, resulting in large clouds of volcanic ash, led to the closure of the surrounding Turrialba Volcano National Park. However, with the eruptions subsiding, the park and access to the volcano reopened on December 4, 2020.

The stratovolcano is 3,340 m (10,958 ft) high and is about 45 minutes from the Atlantic slope town of Turrialba. The summit has three craters, the largest of which has a diameter of 50 m (160 ft). Turrialba is adjacent to Irazú and both are among Costa Rica's largest volcanoes. Turrialba has experienced at least five large explosive eruptions in the last 3500 years. The volcano is monitored by the Deep Earth Carbon Degassing Project.

On clear days both the Pacific Ocean and Caribbean Sea can be seen from the summit. Below the summit is a mountain range and montane forest, with ferns, bromeliads, lichens, and mosses. Most of the forest is either primary or secondary forest.

The volcano is named after its canton, Turrialba, in Costa Rica's Cartago Province. There is no clear consensus on the origin of the name Turrialba, but historians disagree with attempts to attribute the name to the patronym Torrealba (from Aragon in Spain) or from the Latin Turris alba (white tower). The general consensus is that Turrialba derives from the local Indian (Huetar language), but there is no agreement on its actual roots.

== Activity ==
- During the 19th century, the volcano erupted and emitted ash several times (1847, 1853, 1855, 1859, 1866), producing pyroclastic flows. The last major eruption was in 1866.
- Small signs of activity started in 1996.
- In January 2001, the volcano reported increased activity, displaying strong fumarole activity at the central craters. The volcanic activities have increased since 2005.
- On March 31, 2007, the volcano started to show some activity with ash eruptions.
- The National Park area opened for visitors was closed from 2009 to 2011.

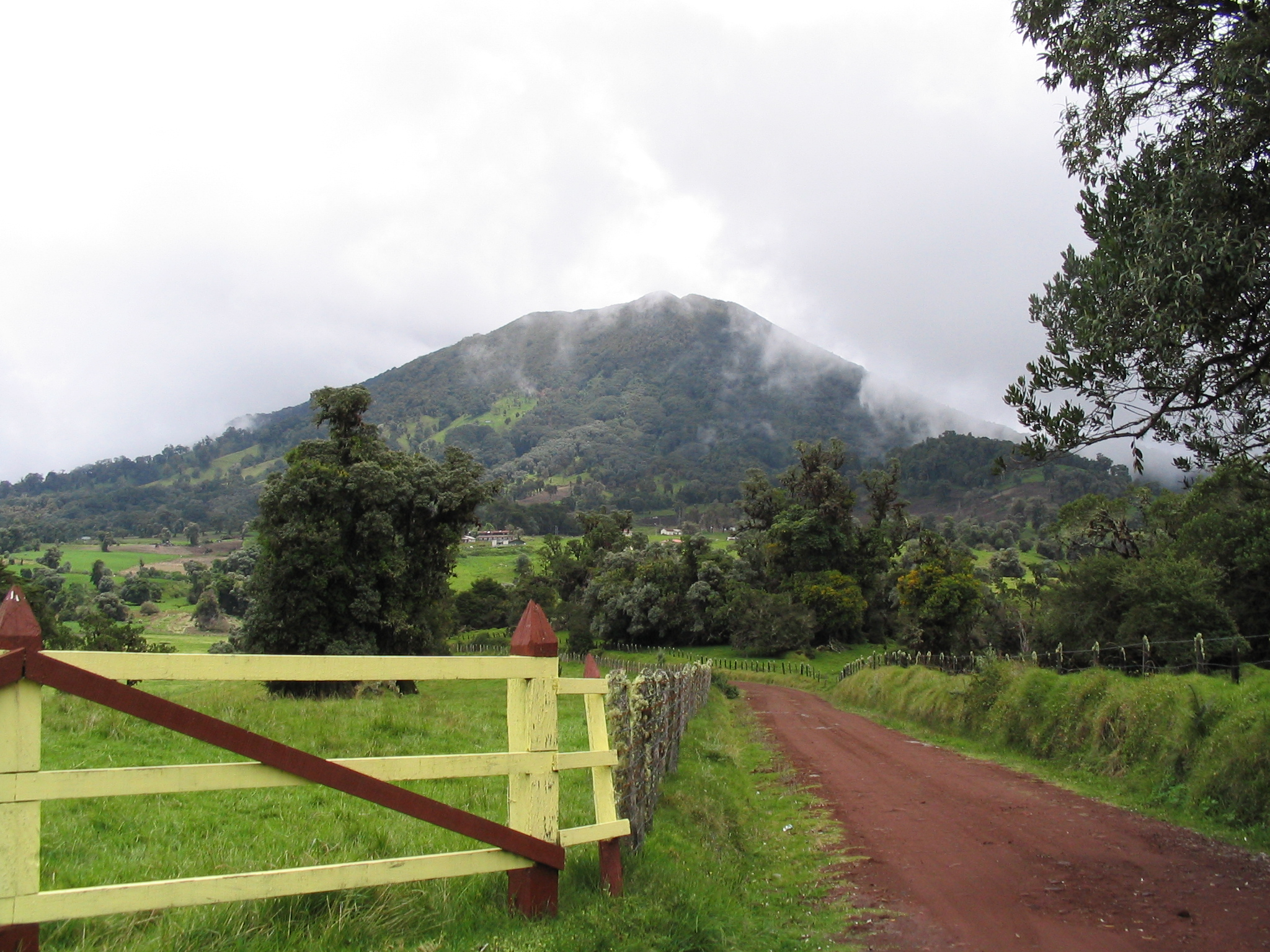
Turrialba in 2005

- On January 8, 2010, a phreatic eruption occurred, creating a new opening near the crater on the southwest, and the temperature increased from 200 to 600 °C (392 to 1,112 °F). Two villages, La Central and El Retiro, were evacuated.
- In January 2012 a new opening on the west of the crater was created after a phreatic eruption.
- On April 12, 2012, a small eruption occurred.
- On May 21, 2013, at 08:52, a gas explosion widened several openings near the main crater that appeared in 2010 and 2012.
- In July 2013 researchers found that tremors around the area increased from about twenty earthquakes a day, to up to thirty per hour.
- On October 17, 2014, the quantity of tremors increased from around 50-100 a day, to 200 a day.
- On October 29, 2014, at around 10:10, a tremor started and kept constant, until a phreatic eruption occurred around 23:10 at the west opening that appeared in January 2012. This eruption sent a large amount of volcanic material to areas up to 40 km (25 mi) away. Many citizens reported ash falling on their properties and a strong odor of sulphur in the cantons of Vázquez de Coronado, Goicoechea, Moravia, Desamparados, Aserrí, Escazú, Santa Ana, Montes de Oca, Tibás, Alajuelita, Puriscal, San José in the province of San José, La Union in the province of Cartago and Santo Domingo and Heredia, in the province of Heredia.

=== March 2015 ===
- On March 12, 2015, eruptions at around 11:00 and 14:12 sent ashes through all the Central Valley, it is regarded as the most significant activity since 1996. The Juan Suantamaría and Tobías Bolaños international airports were closed due to visibility being less than 100 meters.
- On March 13, 2015, an eruption occurred at 21:07.

=== May 2015 ===
- On May 4, 2015, an eruption occurred at 15:24.

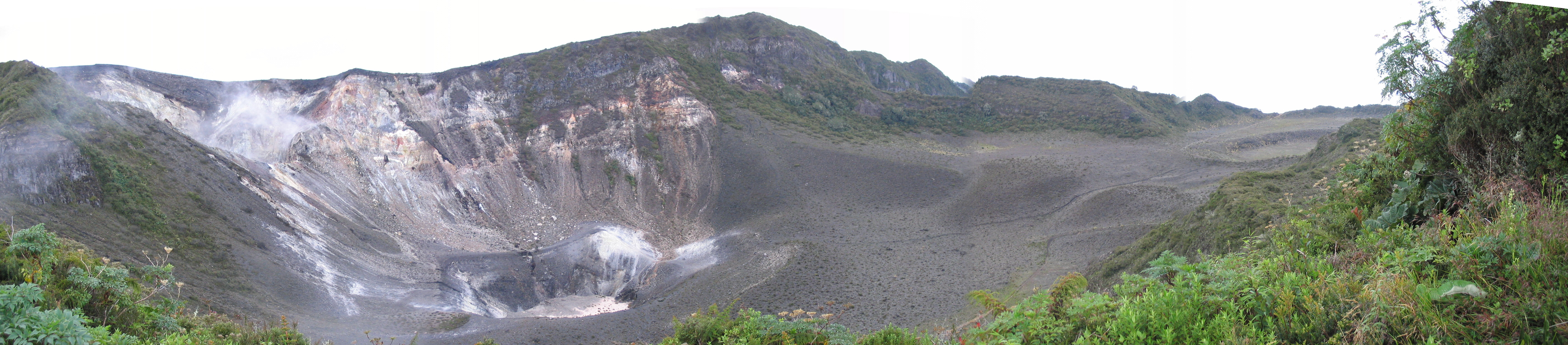
The three craters of the volcano, the oldest one is to the right, the newest and most active is to the left.

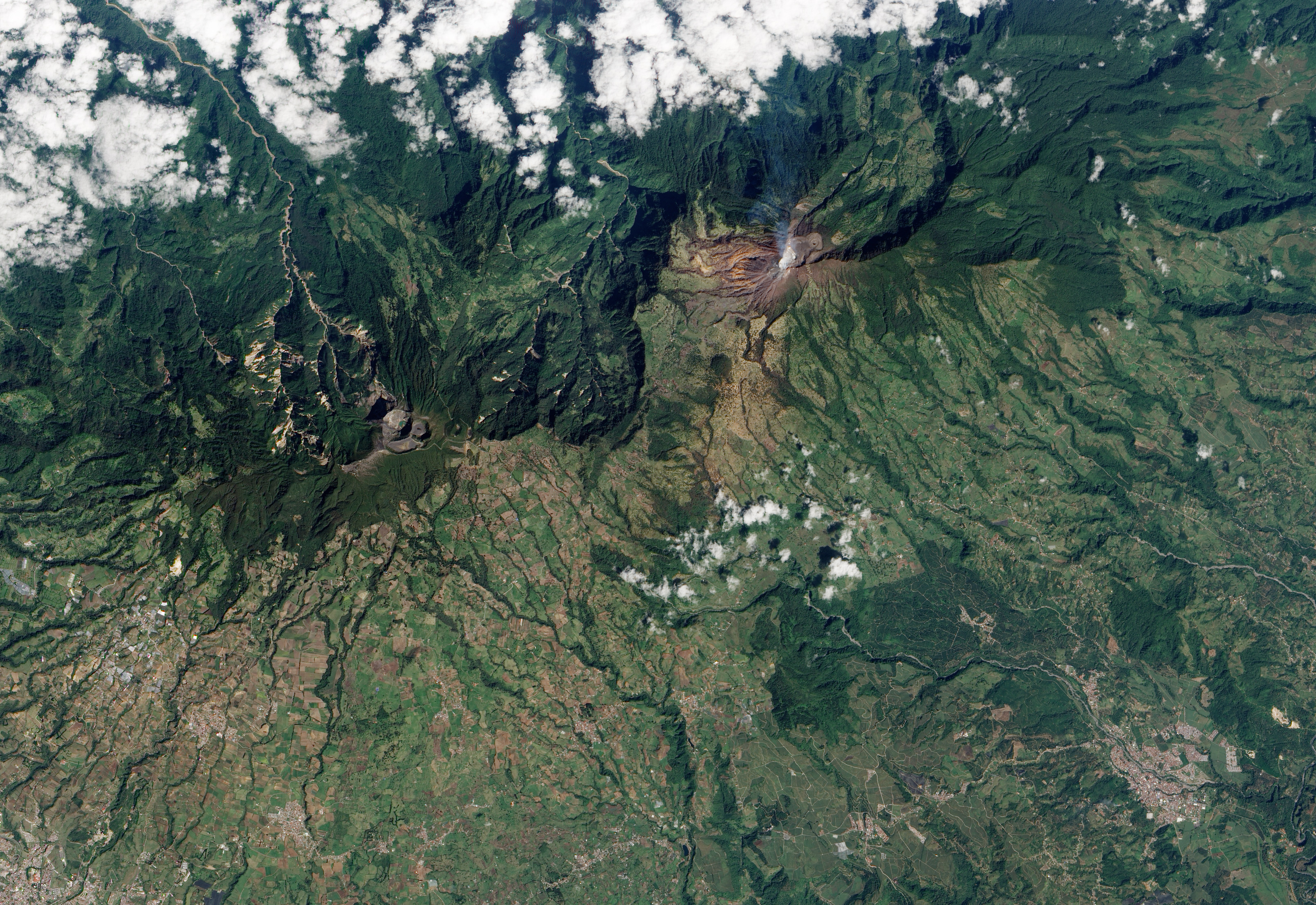
Turrialba emits a translucent plume of volcanic gases in this natural-colour satellite image.

=== May 2016 ===
An eruption occurred on May 21, 2016. It was characterized by one resident as the largest since 2010. Ash fell as far away as the capital, San Jose, and at least 500 people went to hospitals complaining of breathing problems. Flights into San Jose were cancelled due to concerns about ash.

=== September 2016 ===
On September 19, at 02:54 an eruption lasting around fifteen minutes was the first event of many through the day that eventually covered the metropolitan area with ash. There were events at 11:30, 14:40, 15:34.

The events continued through September 20 with an eruption at 06:20.

Airports in the metropolitan area were closed.

== See also ==
- List of volcanoes in Costa Rica
