= Chiba Prefectural Board of Education =

Chiba Prefectural Board of Education is a department of the Chiba Prefecture in Japan, comprising six members. As of April 2024, the head is Masako Tomizuka.

The board supervises elementary and middle schools operated by other school districts and directly operates public high schools.

== Schools directly operated by the prefecture ==
=== High schools ===
==== Abiko ====
- Abiko High School (Japanese: )
- Fusa High School
- Kohoku High School

==== Asahi ====
- Asahi High School
- Toso Technical High School

==== Chiba ====
- Chiba High School
- Chiba East High School
- Chiba North High School
- Chiba Ohmiya High School
- Chiba South High School
- Chiba West High School
- Kashiwai High School
- Kemigawa High School
- Wakamatsu High School
- Chishirodai High School
- Isobe High School
- Izumi High School
- Kotehashi High School
- Makuhari Sohgoh High School (Japanese: )
- Oihama High School
- Toke High School
- Chiba Girls' High School
- Chiba Technical High School
- Keiyo Industrial High School
- Chiba Commercial High School

==== Chosei District ====
- Ichinomiya Commercial High School (Ichinomiya)

==== Choshi ====
- Choshi High School
- Choshi Commercial High School
- Choshi Fishery High School

==== Funabashi ====
- Funabashi High School
- Funabashi Asahi High School
- Funabashi East High School
- Funabashi Houden High School
- Funabashi Kowagama High School
- Funabashi West High School
- Funabashi Shibayama High School
- Funabashi Tawa High School
- Funabashi Toyo High School
- Funabashi West High School
- Yakuendai High School

==== Futtsu ====
- Amaha High School
- Kimitsu Commercial High School

==== Ichihara ====
- Anesaki High School
- Ichihara High School
- Ichihara Midori High School
- Ichihara Yawata High School
- Keiyo High School
- Tsurumai High School

==== Ichikawa ====
- Gyotoku High School
- Kohnodai High School
- Kokubun High School
- Ichikawa High School
- Ichikawa East High School
- Ichikawa North High School
- Ichikawa South High School
- Ichikawa West High School

==== Inzai ====
- Inba High School

==== Isumi ====
- Misaki High School
- Oohara High School

==== Isumi District ====
- Otaki High School (Otaki)

==== Kamagaya ====
- Kamagaya High School
- Kamagaya West High School

==== Kamogawa ====
- Nagasa High School

==== Kashiwa ====
- Hakuryou High School
- Higashi-Katsushika High School
- Kashiwa High School
- Kashiwa Chuo High School
- Kashiwa North High School
- Kashiwa South High School
- Kashiwa West High School
- Shonan High School
- Takayanagi High School

==== Katori ====
- Omigawa High School (In Omigawa until the 2006 merger into Katori)
- Sawara High School (In Sawara until the 2006 merger into Katori)
- Sawara Hakuyo High School (In Sawara until the 2006 merger into Katori)

==== Katori District ====
- Tako High School (Tako)

==== Katsuura ====
- Katsuura Wakashio High School

==== Kisarazu ====
- Kisarazu High School
- Kisarazu East High School

==== Kimitsu ====
- Kazusa High School
- Kimitsu High School
- Kimitsu Aoba High School

==== Matsudo ====
- Kogane High School
- Matsudo High School
- Matsudo Akiyama High School
- Matsudo Mabashi High School
- Matsudo Mutsumi High School
- Matsudo South High School
- Matsudo Yakiri High School
- Matsudo International High School

==== Minamiboso ====
- Awa Takushin High School

==== Mobara ====
- Chosei High School
- Mobara High School
- Mobara Agricultural High School

==== Nagareyama ====
- Nagareyama High School
- Nagareyama Central High School
- Nagareyama East High School
- Nagareyama North High School
- Nagareyama South High School

==== Narashino ====
- Mimomi High School
- Tsudanuma High School

==== Narita ====
- Narita North High School
- Narita Seiryo High School
- Shimofusa High School (In Shimofusa prior to the town's 2006 merger with Narita)
- Narita International High School

==== Noda ====
- Noda Central High School
- Sekiyado High School
- Shimizu High School

==== Sakura ====
- Sakura High School
- Sakura East High School
- Sakura West High School
- Sakura South High School

==== Sanbu District ====
- Kujukuri High School (Kujukuri)
- Shirasato High School (Oamishirasato)
- Sanbu Agricultural High School (Oamishirasato)

==== Sanmu ====
- Matsuo High School (In Matsuo until the 2006 merger into Sanmu)
- Narutou High School (In Naruto until the 2006 merger into Sanmu)

==== Shiroi ====
- Shiroi High School

==== Sodegaura ====
- Sodegaura High School

==== Sosa ====
- Sosa High School

==== Tateyama ====
- Awa High School
- Awa South High School
- Tateyama High School
- Awa Fishery High School

==== Togane ====
- Togane High School
- Togane Commercial High School

==== Tomisato ====
- Tomisato High School

==== Urayasu ====
- Urayasu High School
- Urayasu South High School

==== Yachimata ====
- Yachimata High School

==== Yachiyo ====
- Yachiyo High School
- Yachiyo West High School
- Yachiyo East High School

==== Yotsukaido ====
- Yotsukaido High School
- Yotsukaido North High School
