= List of Stop!! Hibari-kun! chapters =

The cover of the first volume of the Stop!! Hibari-kun! manga released by Shueisha on November 15, 1982 in Japan.

The manga series Stop!! Hibari-kun! is written and illustrated by Hisashi Eguchi. It was serialized in the manga magazine Weekly Shōnen Jump from the October 19, 1981, issue to the November 28, 1983, issue. The series follows Kōsaku Sakamoto, a high school student who goes to live with yakuza boss Ibari Ōzora and his four children—Tsugumi, Tsubame, Hibari and Suzume—after the death of his mother. Kōsaku is shocked to learn that Hibari, who looks and behaves as a girl, was assigned male at birth.

The chapters were collected and published in four tankōbon volumes by Shueisha starting on November 15, 1982; the last volume was released on January 15, 1984. Futabasha later published it in three volumes in July 1991, and again in two volumes in February 1995. Shueisha republished it in four volumes from May to June 2001. Home-sha published it in two volumes in January 2004. Shogakukan published a Stop!! Hibari-kun! Complete Edition omnibus collection in three volumes from July 2009 to February 2010; Shogakukan later republished the series in another three volumes from May to July 2012.

== Volume list ==
=== Shueisha ===
| No. | Title | Release date | ISBN |
|---|---|---|---|
| 1 | A Shocking Encounter!! Shōgeki no Deai!! no Maki (衝撃の出会い!!の巻) | November 15, 1982 | 978-4-08-851391-1 |
| 2 | Going In! Hairimasu! no Maki (はいります!の巻) | March 15, 1983 | 978-4-08-851392-8 |
| 3 | Poolside Excitement! Pūrusaido wa Dokidoki Kibun! no Maki (プールサイドはドキドキ気分!の巻) | June 15, 1983 | 978-4-08-851393-5 |
| 4 | The Noted Couple; Wadai no Kappuru no Maki (話題のカップルの巻) | January 15, 1984 | 978-4-08-851394-2 |

| No. | Title | Release date | ISBN |
|---|---|---|---|
| 1 | A Girl!? A Boy!! Onna no Ko!? Otoko no Ko!! no Maki (女の子!?男の子!!の巻) | May 2001 | 978-4-08-106030-6 |
| 2 | Youth Without U-turns! Kaiten Kinshi no Seishunsa! no Maki (回転禁止の青春さ!の巻) | May 2001 | 978-4-08-106036-8 |
| 3 | She's (?) Mine!! Kanojo (?) wa Ore no Mono!! no Maki (彼女(?)はおれのもの!!の巻) | June 2001 | 978-4-08-106042-9 |
| 4 | Tomorrow's Bride!? Ashita no Hanayome!? no Maki (あしたの花嫁!?の巻) | June 2001 | 978-4-08-106048-1 |

=== Futabasha ===
| No. | Release date | ISBN |
|---|---|---|
| 1 | July 1, 1991 | 978-4-57-528113-2 |
| 2 | July 1, 1991 | 978-4-57-528114-9 |
| 3 | July 1, 1991 | 978-4-57-528115-6 |

| No. | Release date | ISBN |
|---|---|---|
| 1 | February 10, 1995 | 978-4-57-572018-1 |
| 2 | February 10, 1995 | 978-4-57-572019-8 |

=== Home-sha ===
| No. | Release date | ISBN |
|---|---|---|
| 1 | January 2004 | 978-4-83-427289-5 |
| 2 | January 2004 | 978-4-83-427290-1 |

=== Shogakukan ===
| No. | Release date | ISBN |
|---|---|---|
| 1 | July 15, 2009 | 978-4-77-803119-0 |
1. "A Shocking Encounter" (衝撃の出会い!!の巻, "Shōgeki no Deai!! no Maki"); 2. "A Girl!? A Boy!!" (女の子!?男の子!!の巻, "Onna no Ko!? Otoko no Ko!! no Maki"); 3. "She's!? an Idol!" (彼女!?はアイドル!の巻, "Kanojo!? wa Aidoru! no Maki"); 4. "Act Like a Man!!" (男らしくしなさい!!の巻, "Otokorashiku Shinasai! no Maki"); 5. "She's!? Superman" (彼女!?はスーパーマンの巻, "Kanojo!? wa Sūpāman no Maki"); 6. "The Secret's Out!?" (ば・れ・た!?の巻, "Ba Re Ta!? no Maki"); 7. "Look Carefully! Hibari-kun!!" (正体みたり!ひばりくん!!の巻, "Shōtai Mitari! no Maki"); 8. "Kōsaku-kun Makes Up His Mind" (耕作くん決心すの巻, "Kōsaku-kun Ketsu Kokorosu no Maki"); 9. "Put Love In the Ring!!" (リングにかける恋!!の巻, "Ringu ni Kakeru Koi!! no Maki"); 10. "Put Love In the Ring!! 2" (続・リングにかける恋!!の巻, "Zoku Ringu ni Kakeru Koi!! no Maki"); 11. "Kujūkuri of Love!!" (恋の九十九里!!の巻, "Koi no Kujūkuri!! no Maki"); 12. "Youthful First Sunrise!!" (青春の初日の出!!の巻, "Seishun no Hatsu Hinode!! no Maki"); 13. "This is a Problem" (これが問題の巻, "Kore ga Mondai no Maki"); 14. "Suzume's Boyfriend" (すずめのボーイフレンドの巻, "Suzume no Bōifurendo no Maki"); 15. "Going In!" (はいります!の巻, "Hairimasu! no Maki"); 16. "Not Going In!!" (はいりません!!の巻, "Hairimasen!! no Maki"); 17. "Heart Break Valentine" (ハート・ブレイク・Valentineの巻, "Hāto Bureiku Valentine no Maki")
| 2 | October 14, 2009 | 978-4-77-803120-6 |
18. "An Uninvited Guest" (招かれざる訪問者の巻, "Manekarezaru Hōmonsha no Maki"); 19. "Dad's Old Photo Album" (父さんの古いアルバムの巻, "Tō-san no Furui Arubamu no Maki"); 20. "Campus Takarazuka" (学園タカラヅカの巻, "Gakuen Takarazuka no Maki"); 21. "Youth Without U-turns!" (回転禁止の青春さ!の巻, "Kaiten Kinshi no Seishun! no Maki"); 22. "J's Confession" (Jの告白の巻, "J no Kokuhaku no Maki"); 23. "Poolside Excitement!" (プールサイドはドキドキ気分!の巻, "Pūsaido wa Dokidoki Kibun! no Maki"); 24. "Poolside Mission" (プールサイド作戦の巻, "Pūsaido Misshon no Maki"); 25. "Summer Suspicions" (夏の疑惑の巻, "Natsu no Giwaku no Maki"); 26. "Youthful Camp-in" (青春のキャンプインの巻, "Seishun no Kyanpuin no Maki"); 27. "Youth is a Test of Courage" (青春はきもだめしの巻, "Seishun wa Kimodameshi no Maki"); 28. "A Storm is Here!!" (嵐がやってきた!!の巻, "Arashi ga Yattekita!! no Maki"); 29. "The Wind Rises" (風立ちぬの巻, "Kazetachinu no Maki"); 30. "Kōsaku-kun, Hang In There!!" (耕作くん ぐゎむばって!!の巻, "Kōsaku-kun Gwamubatte!! no Maki"); 31. "Romeo and Juliet: Yakuza Edition (Part 1)" (ロミオとジュリエット極道版の巻 前編, "Romio to Jurietto Gokudō-ban no Maki Zenpen"); 32. "Romeo and Juliet: Yakuza Edition (Part 2)" (ロミオとジュリエット極道版の巻 後編, "Romio to Jurietto Gokudō-ban no Maki Kōhen"); 33. "All Right!! Finally Our First Date!!" (ついにやったネ!!初デート!!の巻, "Tsui ni Yatta ne!! Hatsu Dēto!! no Maki"); 34. "One-two Punch of Love" (恋のワンツーパンチの巻, "Koi no Wantsū Panchi no Maki"); 35. "The Tricks of Love" (恋のかけひきの巻, "Koi no Kakehiki no Maki")
| 3 | February 26, 2010 | 978-4-77-803121-3 |
36. "Love Target!!" (恋のターゲット!!の巻, "Koi no Tāgetto!! no Maki"); 37. "She's (!?) Mine" (彼女(!?)はおれのものの巻, "Kanojo (!?) wa Ore no Mono no Maki"); 38. "The Noted Couple" (話題のカップルの巻, "Wadai no Kappuru no Maki"); 39. "Merry Ninth Memorial Service" (メリー10回忌の巻, "Merī Jū-kaiki no Maki"); 40. "Mafia Connection" (マフィアコネクションの巻, "Mafia Konekushon no Maki"); 41. "Tomorrow's Bride!?" (あしたの花嫁!?の巻, "Ashita no Hanayome!? no Maki"); 42. "The New Face of Love" (恋のニューフェースの巻, "Koi no Nyū Fēsu no Maki"); 43. "Love Bomber!!" (ラブボンバー!!の巻, "Rabu Bonbā!! no Maki"); 44. "A Strange Love Triangle" (ふしぎなΔ関係の巻, "Fushigi na Sankaku Kankei no Maki"); 45. "On the Night of the Festival!!" (お祭りの夜に!!の巻, "Omatsuri no Yoru ni!! no Maki"); 46. "Boxing With Me!?" (ボクと一緒にボクシング!?の巻, "Boku to Issho ni Bokushingu!? no Maki"); 47. "Tomorrow's Hibari-kun" (あしたのひばりくんの巻, "Ashita no Hibari-kun no Maki"); 48. "Hello, Hitman (Part 1)" (鉄砲玉さんいらっしゃい 前編, "Teppōdama-san Irasshai Zenpen"); 49. "Hello, Hitman (Part 2)" (鉄砲玉さんいらっしゃい 後編, "Teppōdama-san Irasshai Kōhen"); 50. "Love Triangle!!" (恋のトライアングル!!の巻, "Koi no Toraianguru!! no Maki"); 51. "Who's the Prince and the Princess!?" (だれが王子で王女様!?の巻, "Dare ga Ōji de Ōjo-sama!? no Maki"); 52. "Panic in Kotobuki Studio" (パニック・イン・寿スタジオ!!の巻, "Panikku In Kotobuki Sutajio!! no Maki"); 53. "Tough Guy Gekijirō" (硬派激二郎!!の巻, "Kōha Gekijirō no Maki"); "Afterword" (あとがき, "Atogaki"); "Bonus Track"

| No. | Title | Release date | ISBN |
|---|---|---|---|
| 1 | A Shocking Encounter!! Shōgeki no Deai!! no Maki (衝撃の出会い!!の巻) | May 16, 2012 | 978-4-77-806034-3 |
| 2 | Poolside Excitement! Pūrusaido wa Dokidoki Kibun! no Maki (プールサイドはドキドキ気分!の巻) | June 13, 2012 | 978-4-77-806035-0 |
| 3 | Love Triangle!! Koi no Toraianguru!! no Maki (恋のトライアングル!!の巻) | July 18, 2012 | 978-4-77-806036-7 |
