= Takahashi Yoshitoki =

Japanese astronomer (1764-1804)

- 高橋至時
- Born: December 22, 1764; Osaka, Japan
- Died: February 15, 1804 (aged 39); Edo, Japan

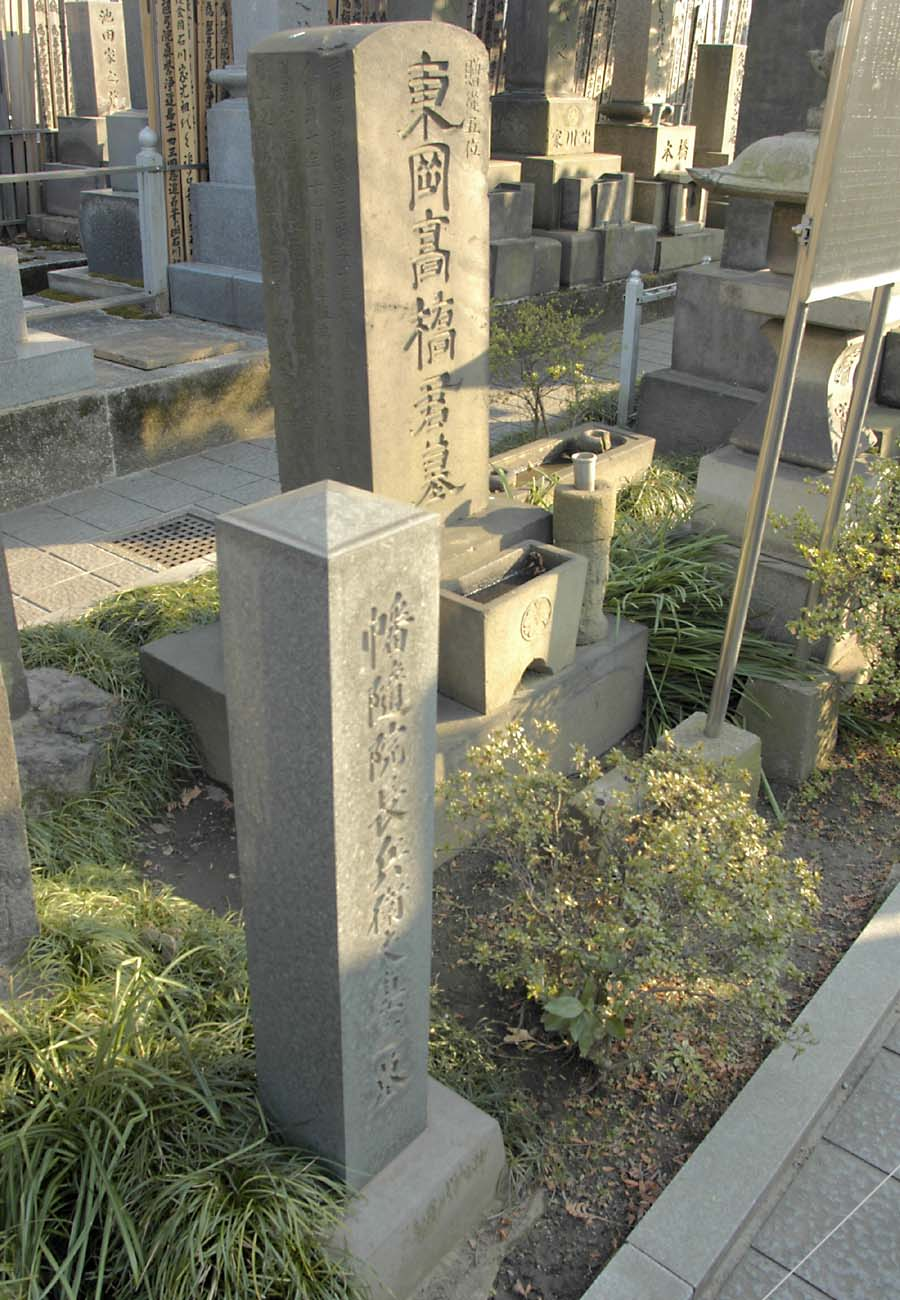
Grave of Takahashi Yoshitoki at Genkū-ji

Takahashi Yoshitoki (高橋至時) (22 December 1764 – 15 February 1804) was an astronomer in mid-Edo period Japan, noted for his work in calendar reform, and as the teacher of the surveyor Inō Tadataka.

== Biography ==
Takahashi was born as the son of a lower-ranking samurai in the guard of Osaka Castle, and followed his father into service at Osaka in 1778. He was interested in mathematics from an early age, and studied under the Osaka-based physician and astronomer Asada Goryu in 1787. At the time, the Japanese were using the lunisolar Hōryaku calendar, which had become increasing inaccurate, and which had missed the forecast of a solar eclipse in 1763. On the other hand, this solar eclipse was predicted by several astronomers in the field, one of whom was Asada Goryu. After that, Goryu read Chinese and Western astronomy and created his own calendar, "Ephemeris Time," which took into account his own theories. The new calendar was well received, but Takahashi was not convinced it was a complete solution. Together with fellow mathematician and astronomer Hazama Shigetomi, he exhaustively studied Chinese and Western calendars as well as the previous Japanese Jōkyō calendar. He reached the conclusion that a source of inaccuracy of previous lunisolar calendars was based on an assumption that celestial bodies rotated in circular orbits, as postulated in the West by Tycho Brahe, whereas their actual orbits were elliptical, as advocated by Johannes Kepler. Together with Asada and Hazama, he developed a new calendar theory, and his reputation as an astronomer became unrivaled in Japan at the time.

In 1795, Takahashi was ordered to Edo where he established the Shogunate Astronomical Observatory. Also while in Edo, he was approached by Inō Tadataka, who despite being 19 years senior in age, asked to become his disciple. Inō was interested in the problem of determining the true length of a Meridian arc, and walked the distance from his home in Fukagawa to Takahashi's observatory in Asakusa to obtain the data necessary for a rough calculation. Takahashi advised that the number was hopelessly inaccurate over a short distance, and calculated that measurements would need to be made over a distance roughly between Edo and the northern island of Ezo in order to obtain an accurate value. This was one of the main objectives of Inō's subsequent surveying expeditions.

In 1796, Takahashi received official approval for his new calendar, and was ordered make astronomical observations between Edo and Kyoto, where he had to convince the influential Tsuchimikado clan, a clan of court nobility who advised the Emperor of Japan on ceremonies tied to the calendar dates, on the validity of his reforms. In 1797, the new calendar was formally adopted as the Kansei calendar The new calendar proved to be quickly popular and Takahashi gained great trust from the Shogunate. On the other hand, he was aware that the calendar still had a few shortcomings and between staying up all night for astronomical observations and travels to Kyoto to speak with the Tsuchimikado clan, his health deteriorated and he developed tuberculosis. A solar eclipse in 1802 revealed a 15-minute discrepancy in the calendar which needed additional observations, calculations and corrections. In 1803, Takahashi obtained a copy of a book by the French astronomer Jérôme Lalande, in which the movements of five major planets was described. This work was an eye-opener for Takahashi, as it filled in a major gap in his own calendar theories. Working day and night, his research on the book in the six months between late 1803 and early 1804 formed a manuscript over 2000 pages long, and caused a series relapse in his illness. He died in February 1804 at the age of 41. Takahashi's grave is at the temple of Genkū-ji. The grave was designated a National Historic Site in 1943.

Takahashi's work was continued by his sons and his disciples. Inō Tadataka died in 1818 shortly after the completion of his survey of all of Japan, and per his will was buried next to Takahashi at Genkū-ji. Takahashi's eldest son, Takahashi Kageyasu, succeeded him as official astronomer and continued the translation and research work on the writings of Jérôme Lalande until his death in prison in 1829 in connection with the Siebold Incident. Takahashi's second son, Takahashi Kagesuke, was instrumental in the development of the Tenpō calendar.
