= Hōryaku calendar =

Japanese lunisolar calendar

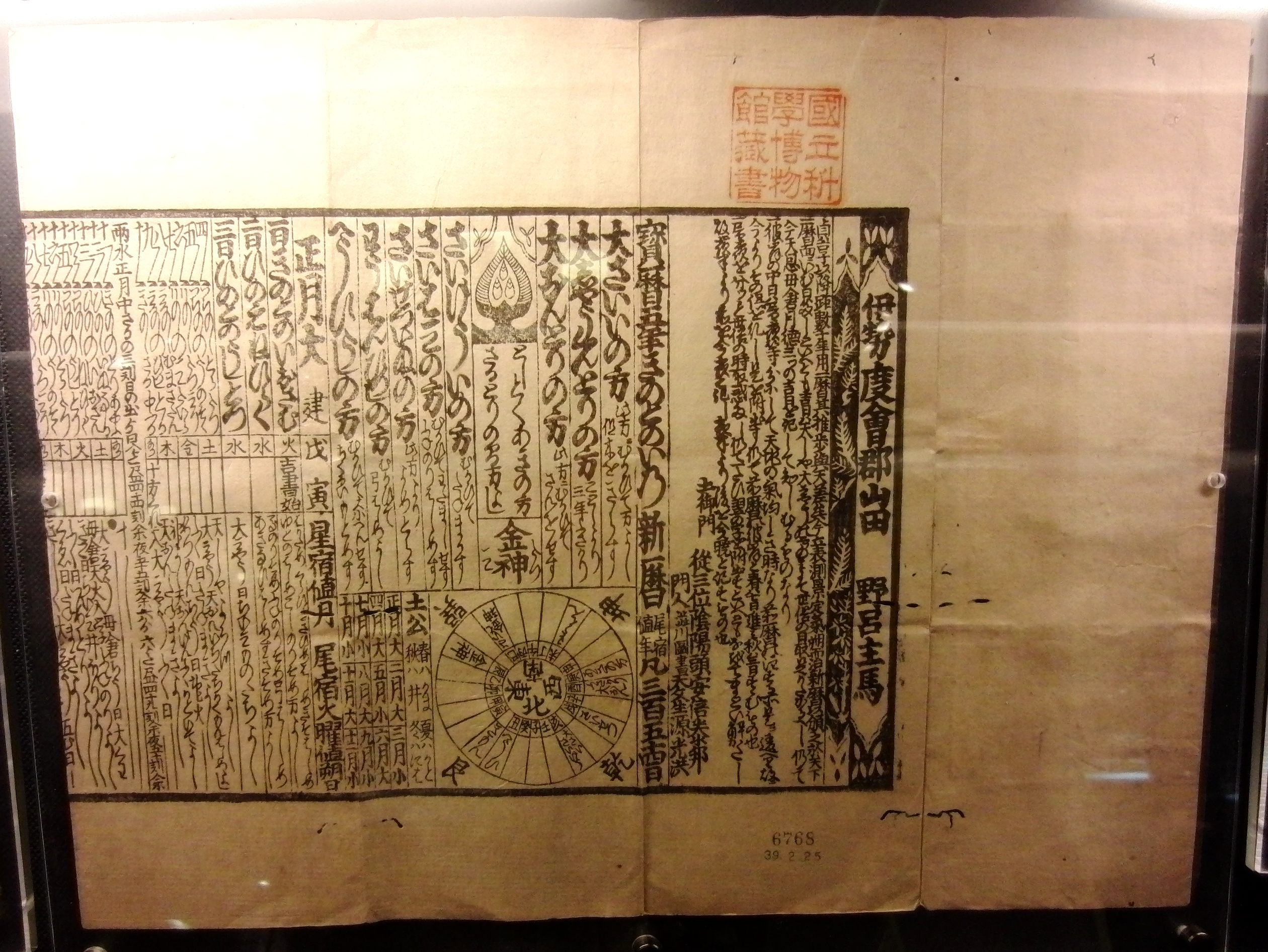
Hōryaku calendar published in 1755. Exhibit in the National Museum of Nature and Science, Tokyo, Japan.

The Hōryaku calendar (宝暦暦, Hōryaku-reki) was a Japanese lunisolar calendar (genka reki). It was also known as Hōryaku Kōjutsu Gen-reki (宝暦甲戌元暦). It was published in 1755.

== History ==
The Hōryaku Kōjutsu Genreki system was the work of Abe Yasukuni, Shibukawa Kōkyō, and Nishiyama Seikyū. Errors in the calendar were corrected in 1798 and in 1844. In 1872, the Western calendar was adopted.

== See also ==
- Japanese calendar
- Sexagenary cycle
- Hōreki
