= Green Tower, Sanbu =

Green Tower
- グリーンタワー
- Interactive map of the Green Tower area

General information
- Type: Observation tower
- Location: 1904 Sanbu, Chiba
- Coordinates: 35°38′31.9″N 140°22′7.8″E
- Completed: 1998

Height
- Antenna spire: 60 metres (197 ft)

Green Tower (グリーンタワー, Garīn-tawā) is a 60-meter-high (200-foot) lattice tower located in Forest Park at Sanbu, Chiba, Japan. Built in 1998, the tower represents the Sanbu Japanese cedar tree. It includes an observation deck located at 40 metres (131 ft) that provides visitors with a 360-degree view of the surrounding landscape.
