= Kansei (disambiguation) =

Kansei is a Japanese era name.

Kansei may also refer to:

- Kansei calendar, a Japanese lunisolar calendar
- Kansei engineering, a method for translating feelings and impressions into product parameters
- Kansei Edict, a document that banned any teaching or propagation of heterodox studies
- Kansei Matsuzawa (born 1999), a Japanese player of American football
- Kansei Nakano, a Japanese politician
- Kansei Reforms, a series of Japanese reactionary policy changes
- Calsonic Kansei, Japanese automotive company
