= Yachimata =

Yachimata 八街市
- City
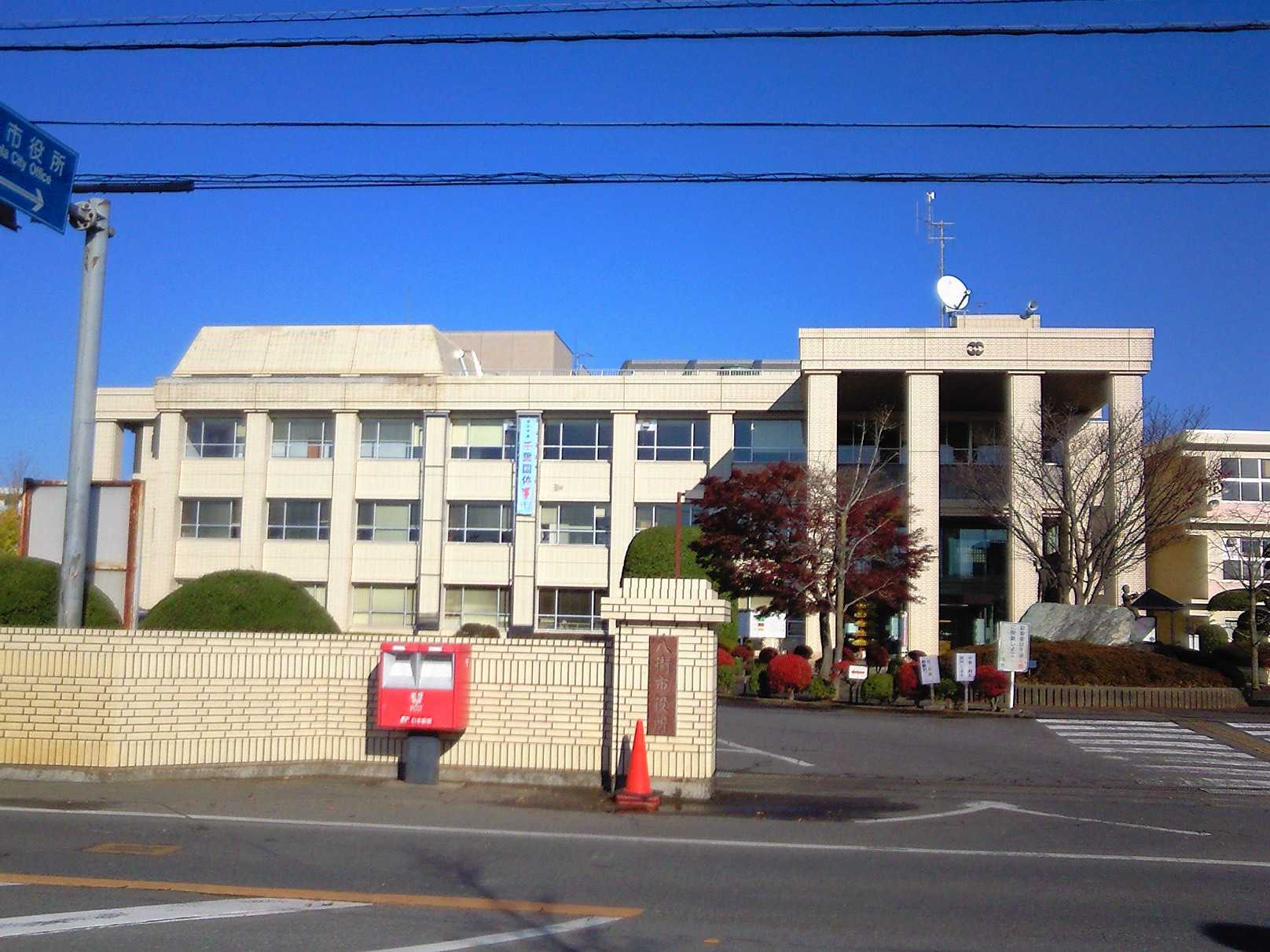
- Yachimata City Hall

- Flag Emblem

- Location of Yachimata in Chiba Prefecture

- Coordinates: 35°40′N 140°19′E
- Country: Japan
- Region: Kantō
- Prefecture: Chiba

Government
  - Mayor: Shinji Kitamura (since December 2010)

Area
  - Total: 74.87 km^{2} (28.91 sq mi)

Population (December 2020)
  - Total: 68,769
  - Density: 918.5/km^{2} (2,379/sq mi)
- Time zone: UTC+9 (Japan Standard Time)
- -Tree: Osmanthus fragrans
- Flower: Sunflower
- Phone number: 043-443-1111
- Address: 35-29 Yachimata Ho, Yachimata-shi, Chiba-ken 289-1192
- Website: Official website

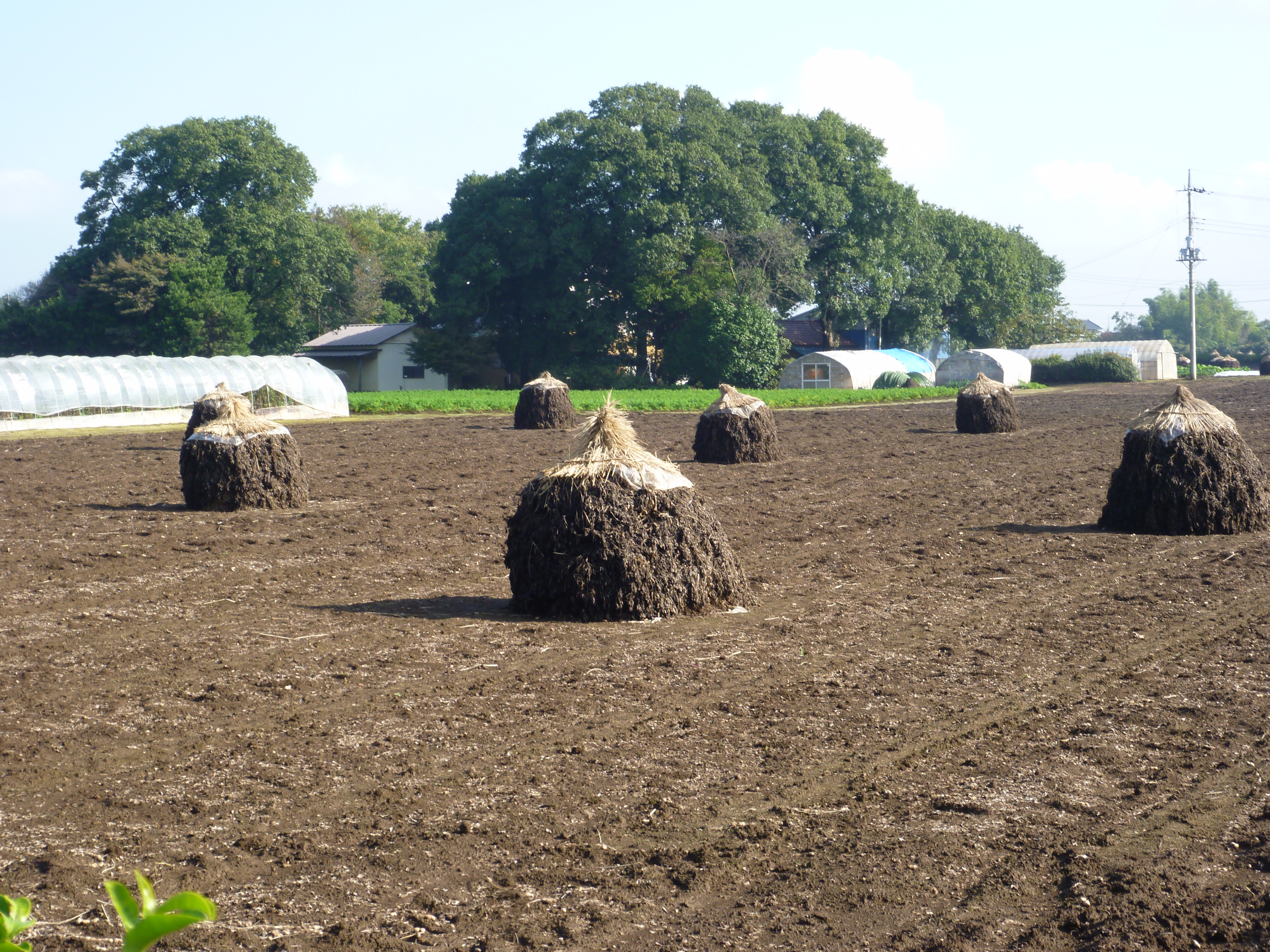
Peanut fields in Yachimata

Yachimata (八街市, Yachimata-shi) is a city in Chiba Prefecture, Japan. As of 1 December 2020, the city had an estimated population of 68,769 in 32,118 households and a population density of 920 persons per km^{2}. The total area of the city is 74.87 square kilometres (28.91 sq mi).

== Geography ==
Yachimata is located in north-central part of Chiba prefecture, about 20 kilometers from the prefectural capital at Chiba, and about 50 to 60 kilometers from the center of Tokyo. The city is located on the Shimosa Plateau, with an elevation of 14 to 70 meters above sea level. The geographic central part of the city forms the urban area, with flat upland fields surrounding it, and paddy fields scattered in the southwest and north. The city is approximately 7.7 kilometers from east to west by 16 kilometers long north to south. The city is noted for its traditional wind break forests, of which some 179 hectares survive.

=== Neighboring municipalities ===
Chiba Prefecture

- Chiba
- Sakura
- Sanmu
- Shisui
- Tōgane
- Tomisato

=== Climate ===
Yachimata has a humid subtropical climate (Köppen Cfa) characterized by warm summers and cool winters with light to no snowfall. The average annual temperature in Yachimata is 14.9 °C. The average annual rainfall is 1503 mm with September as the wettest month. The temperatures are highest on average in August, at around 26.0 °C, and lowest in January, at around 4.7 °C.

== Demographics ==
Per Japanese census data, the population of Yachimata peaked around the year 2010 and has declined since.

Historical population
Year	Pop.	±%
1920	14,840	—
1930	16,298	+9.8%
1940	18,345	+12.6%
1950	24,867	+35.6%
1960	25,387	+2.1%
1970	25,375	−0.0%
1980	31,939	+25.9%
1990	50,036	+56.7%
2000	72,595	+45.1%
2010	73,212	+0.8%
2020	67,455	−7.9%

== History ==
Yachimata was part of a region of horse ranches under the direct control of the Tokugawa shogunate in the Edo period. After the Meiji Restoration, the hamlet of Yachimata was founded on November 2, 1872 within Inba District, Chiba Prefecture. Yachimata was officially designated a village on April 1, 1889 with the creation of the modern municipalities system, and was elevated to town status on January 1, 1919. The village expanded in 1954 through annexation of a portion of neighboring Hyuga Village in Sanbu District and by merging with the village of Kawakami on November 1, 1954. Yachimata was elevated to city status on April 1, 1992.

== Government ==
Yachimata has a mayor-council form of government with a directly elected mayor and a unicameral city council of 20 members. Yachimata contributes one member to the Chiba Prefectural Assembly. In terms of national politics, the city is part of Chiba 9th district of the lower house of the Diet of Japan.

== Economy ==
Yachimata is a regional commercial center whose economy is primarily agricultural. Yachimata is well known for its peanuts. It is included in the Tokyo metropolitan urban employment area, and the commuting rate to Chiba city is 13.7% per the 2010 census.

== Education ==
Yachimata has eight public elementary schools and four public middle schools operated by the city government, and one public high school operated by the Chiba Prefectural Board of Education. There is also one private high school. The prefecture also operates one special education school for the handicapped

== Transportation ==
=== Railway ===
JR East – Sōbu Main Line

- Enokido - Yachimata

=== Highways ===
- National Route 126
- National Route 409

== Notable people from Yachimata ==
- Yoshiki Hiraki, professional soccer player
