= Hasunuma, Chiba =

Hasunuma 蓮沼村
- Former municipality
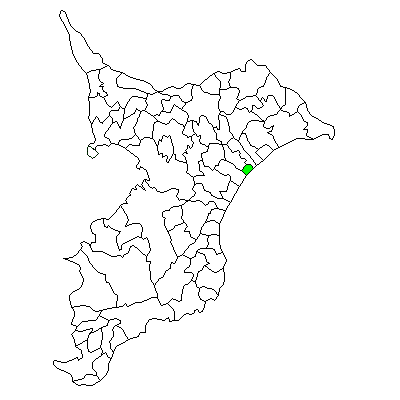
- Location of Hasunuma in Chiba Prefecture

- Location in Japan
- Coordinates: 35.583°N 140.483°E
- Country: Japan
- Region: Kantō
- Prefecture: Chiba Prefecture
- District: Sanbu
- Merged: March 27, 2006 (now part of Sanmu)

Area
  - Total: 9.72 km^{2} (3.75 sq mi)

Population (April 1, 2004)
  - Total: 4,846
  - Density: 499/km^{2} (1,290/sq mi)
- Time zone: UTC+09:00 (JST)
- Symbols
- Bird: Plover
- Flower: Sunflower
- Tree: Podocarpaceae

Hasunuma (蓮沼村, Hasunuma-mura) was a village located in Sanbu District, Chiba Prefecture, Japan.

Hasunuma Village was formed on April 1, 1889, within Musha District. Musha District became part of Sanbu District from April 1, 1897.

On March 27, 2006, Hasunuma, along with the towns of Matsuo, Narutō and Sanbu (all from Sanbu District), was merged to create the city of Sanmu, and thus no longer exists as an independent municipality.

As of April 1, 2004, (the last census data prior to the merger) the village had an estimated population of 4,846 and a population density of 499 persons per km^{2}. The total area was 9.72 km^{2}.

== Notable people ==
Takamasa Suzuki, former professional baseball player
