= Inō Tadataka =

Japanese surveyor and cartographer

Inō Tadataka 伊能 忠敬
- Portrait of Inō Tadataka (1821), attributed to Aoki Katsujirō
- Born: February 11, 1745; Kujūkuri, Kazusa, Tokugawa Shogunate
- Died: May 17, 1818 (aged 73)

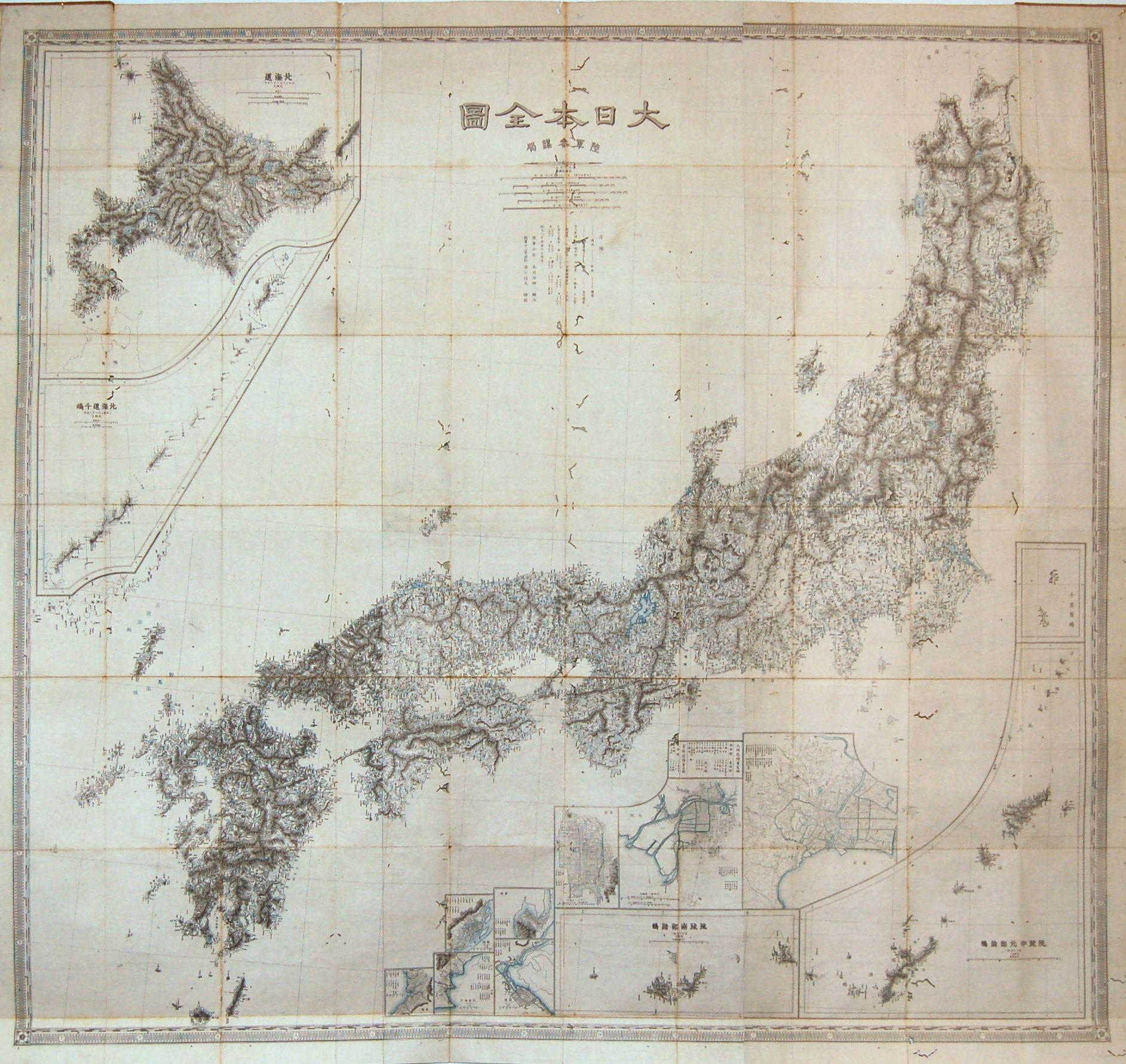
Folding map of Japan (1878) based on survey work performed by Inō Tadataka

Inō Tadataka (伊能 忠敬; Japanese pronunciation: [iꜜ.noː | ta.daꜜ.ta.ka], 11 February 1745 – 17 May 1818) was a Japanese surveyor and cartographer. He is known for completing the first map of Japan using modern surveying techniques.

== Early life ==
Inō was born in the small village of Ozeki in the middle of Kujūkuri beach, in Kazusa Province (in what is now Chiba Prefecture). He was born to the Jimbō family and his childhood name was Sanjirō. His mother died when he was seven and after a somewhat tumultuous childhood (not uncommon at the time), he was adopted (age 17) by the prosperous Inō family of Sawara (now a district of Katori, Chiba), a town in Shimōsa Province. He ran the family business, expanding its sake brewing and rice-trading concerns, until he retired at the age of 49.

After retirement, he moved to Edo and became a pupil of astronomer Takahashi Yoshitoki, from whom he learned Western astronomy, geography, and mathematics.

== Mission ==
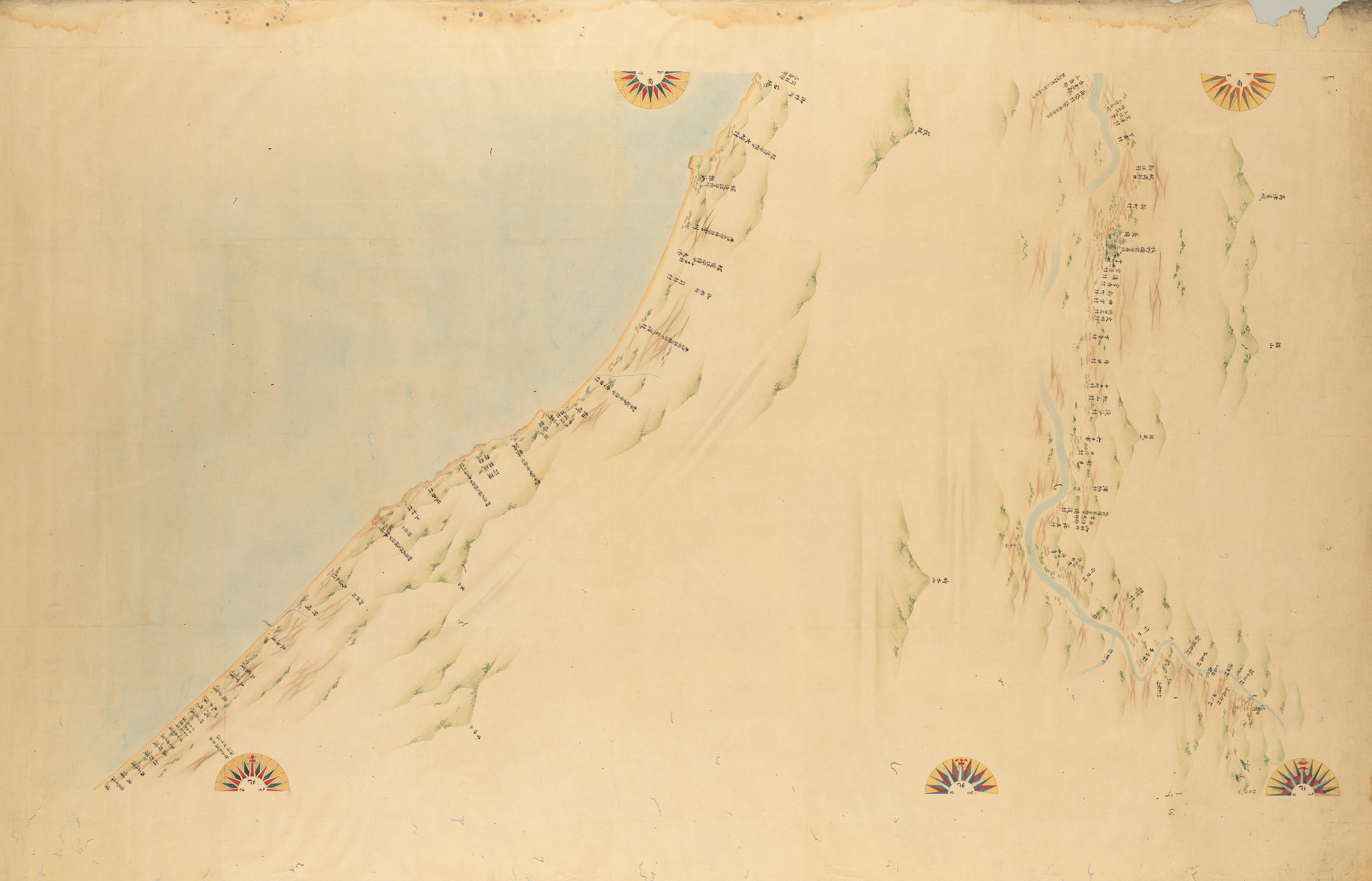
Dai Nihon Enkai Yochi Zenzu No. 76 Echigo Province (Echigo, Tokimizu, Nagaoka, and Katamachi)

Inō petitioned the government to finance a complete survey of Japan to create a first, modern map of the entire country. In 1800, after nearly five years of study, the Tokugawa shogunate authorized Inō to perform a survey of the country, but did not grant him any funds. Inō decided to nevertheless to begin the survey using his own money. This task, which consumed the remaining 17 years of his life, covered the entire coastline and some of the interior of each of the Japanese home islands. During this period Inō reportedly spent 3,736 days making measurements (and traveled 34,913 kilometres), stopping regularly to present the Shōgun with maps reflecting his survey's progress. He produced detailed maps (some at a scale of 1:36,000, others at 1:216,000) of select parts of Japan, mostly in Kyūshū and Hokkaido. Only in later years, after having been presented with his first maps, the Shogunate decided to provide him with some funds, which financed a full group of assistants.

Inō's magnum opus, his 1:216,000 map of the entire coastline of Japan, remained unfinished at his death in 1818 but was completed by his surveying team in 1821. An atlas collecting all of his survey work, Dai Nihon Enkai Yochi Zenzu (ja:大日本沿海輿地全図 Maps of Japan's Coastal Area), was published that year. It had three pages of large-scale maps at 1:432,000, showed the entire country on eight pages at 1:216,000, and had 214 pages of select coastal areas in fine detail at 1:36,000. The Inō-zu (Inō's maps), many of which are accurate to 1/1000 of a degree, remained the definitive maps of Japan for nearly a century, and maps based on his work were in use as late as 1924.

== Expeditions ==
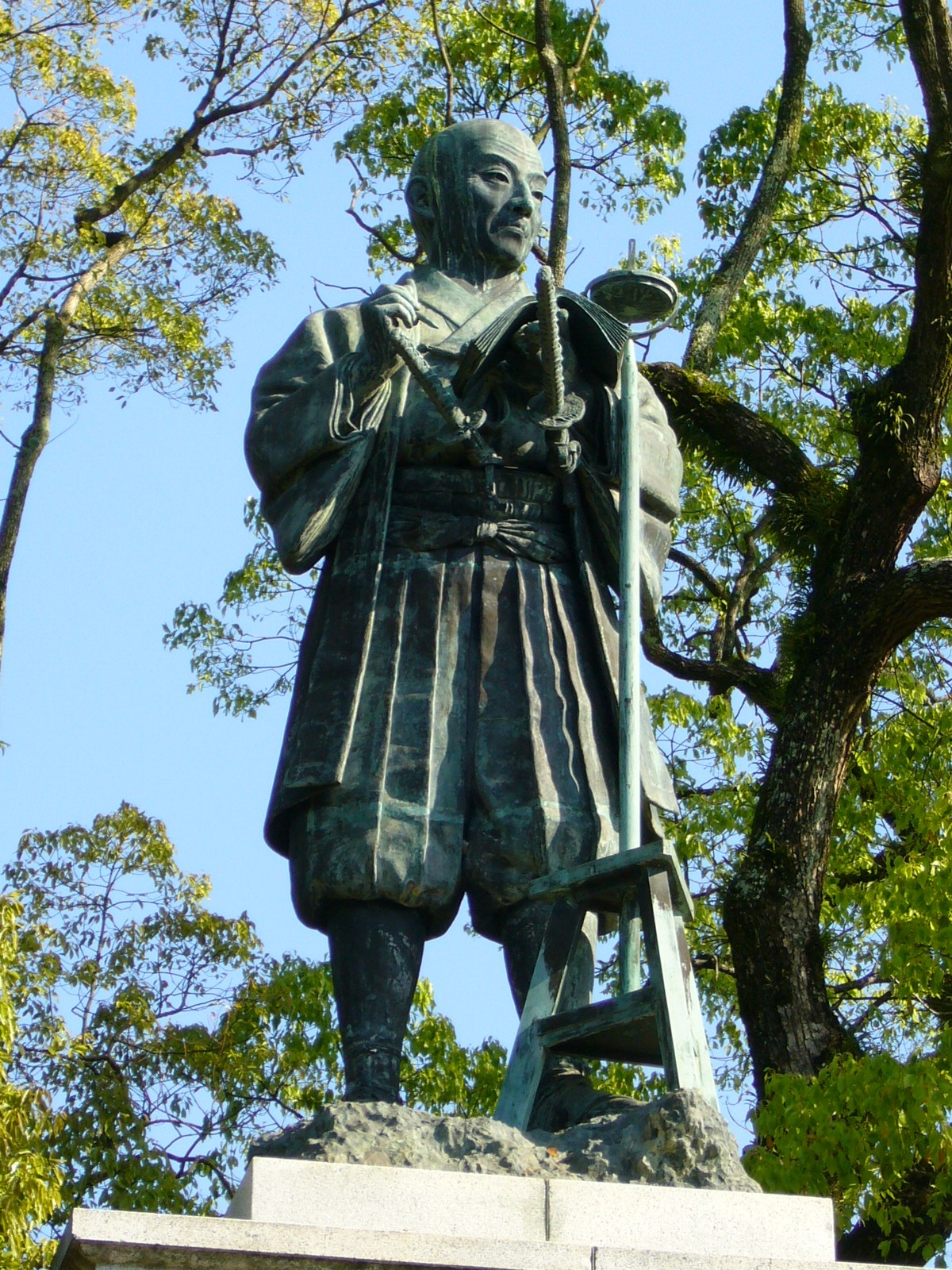
Statue of Inō Tadataka in Katori City

Inō's surveys were done in ten expeditions. The first survey started on June 11, 1800 and included five members. This survey was mainly to begin charting the coast of Hokkaido (where Russian ships had come to open trading houses). This survey was done almost entirely by measuring walking steps and taking astronomical observations. They made it to Bekkai (別解) in far northeast Hokkaido. In total they walked and surveyed 3,244 km.

The results of the first survey, paid for almost entirely by Inō's own funds, helped the shogunal government understand the significance of the work. For this reason, starting with the second expedition (departing Edo in the summer of 1801) he received more support, and the route was more ambitious, covering most of the eastern seaboard from just south of Edo to the far northern tip of Honshū, and then the interior portion on the return trip. This expedition lasted approximately six months and covered 3,122 km.

After the second survey, more and more trust was put in Inō's endeavor. By the fifth expedition, there were 19 people involved, they covered almost 7,000 km. On the 8th expedition they covered over 13,000 km in 914 days, most of it in Kyūshū. By this time Inō was 70 years old, which was decades older than the average lifespan at that time.

In addition to his maps, Inō produced scholarly works on surveying and mathematics, including Chikyū sokuenjutsu mondō and Kyūkatsuen hassenhō.

== Commemoration ==
In November 1995 the Japanese government issued a commemorative 80 yen postage stamp, showing Inō's portrait and a section of his map of Edo.

Most of the complete copies of the atlas have been lost or destroyed (often by fire), although a mostly-complete copy of the large-scale map was discovered in the collection of the U.S. Library of Congress in 2001.

After his death, Inō was one of 37 people honored at the Hokkaidō Shrine as kami associated with the pioneering efforts of the Japanese government to settle and develop Hokkaido.

Inō Tadataka's grave is located at the temple of Genkū-ji in Taitō-ku, Tokyo. The grave was designated a National Historic Site in 1928.

=== Former residence ===
Inō Tadataka Former Residence
- 伊能忠敬旧宅
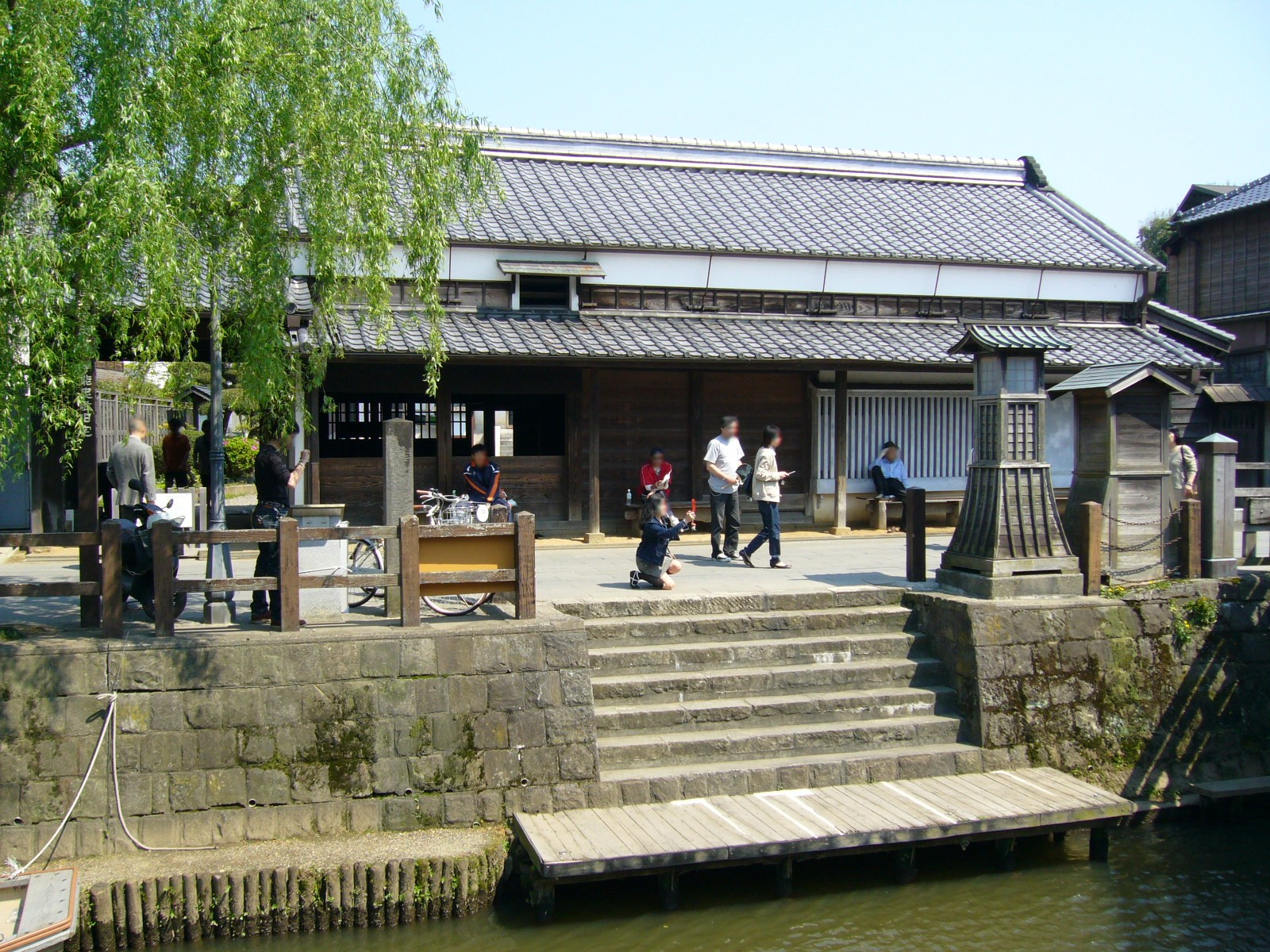
- Inō Tadataka Former Residence

- Location within Chiba Prefecture Location within Japan

General information
- Location: Katori, Chiba, Japan
- Coordinates: 35°53′17″N 140°29′53″E
- Completed: 1793

Inō's home in Sawara still exists, and is located on the bank of the Ono River that flows through the city of Katori. It was designated a National Historic Site in 1930. The building was constructed in the Edo period and is a complex consisting of a gate, main building, and attached kitchen, library and kura warehouse. The buildings are all tiled, and the main building has five rooms. The Inō family ranked as one of Sawara's leading families. Inō lived at this location from the time he was adopted at the age of 17 in 1762 until his retirement and relocation to Edo at the age of 50. However, the existing building dates from 1793, when Inō was 48 years old, so he only actually lived in this structure for two years. The building was previously used as the Inō Tadataka Memorial Museum (伊能忠敬記念館, Inō Tadataka Kinenkan), but this has now been relocated to a new building on the opposite side of the street.

== See also ==
Media related to Ino Tadataka at Wikimedia Commons
