= Stop!! Hibari-kun! =

Japanese manga series by Hisashi Eguchi

- Cover of the first volume, featuring Hibari Ōzora (left) and Kōsaku Sakamoto (right)

ストップ!! ひばりくん! (Sutoppu!! Hibarikun!)
- Genre: Romantic comedy
- Manga
- Written by: Hisashi Eguchi
- Published by: Shueisha
- English publisher: NA: Peow2
- Imprint: Jump Comics
- Magazine: Weekly Shōnen Jump
- Original run: October 19, 1981 – November 28, 1983
- Volumes: 4
- Anime television series
- Directed by: Takashi Hisaoka
- Produced by: Kiyoshi Ōno
- Music by: Koji Nishimura
- Studio: Toei Animation
- Original network: Fuji TV
- Original run: May 20, 1983 – January 27, 1984
- Episodes: 35
- icon

Stop!! Hibari-kun! (Japanese: ストップ!! ひばりくん!, Hepburn: Sutoppu!! Hibari-kun!) is a Japanese manga series written and illustrated by Hisashi Eguchi. It was serialized in Shueisha's shōnen manga magazine Weekly Shōnen Jump from October 1981 to November 1983, and the chapters were published in four tankōbon volumes. The series was adapted into a 35-episode anime television series by Toei Animation that aired on Fuji Television from May 1983 to January 1984. The story focuses on Kōsaku Sakamoto, a high school student who goes to live with yakuza boss Ibari Ōzora and his four children—Tsugumi, Tsubame, Hibari and Suzume—after the death of his mother. Kōsaku is shocked to learn that Hibari, who looks and behaves as a girl, was assigned male at birth.

Eguchi wanted to create a romantic comedy manga where the main female character is a cross-dressing boy so as to poke fun at the genre. He took more time to draw the chapters compared to his earlier manga, and as the serialization continued, he found it increasingly difficult to keep up a weekly pace for the chapters. He eventually abandoned the series after the editor-in-chief of Weekly Shōnen Jump refused his request to release the chapters every other week. From July 2009 to February 2010, Shogakukan published a three-volume Stop!! Hibari-kun! Complete Edition omnibus collection, which features various revisions to the originally published chapters in addition to newly drawn cover art.

Stop!! Hibari-kun! has been described as achieving a dizzying reality with Hibari by contrasting a girlish exterior with a male interior. The series has been praised for its overall light and pop literary style, and the delicate touch in how Hibari is drawn has been described as so attractive that it makes the reader forget that it is a gag manga. However, the jokes surrounding the yakuza characters have been criticized as extreme and no longer humorous in modern times. The series has also been described as having had a hand in paving the way for the J-pop phenomenon.

== Plot ==
Stop!! Hibari-kun! follows Kōsaku Sakamoto, a high school student whose mother tells him on her deathbed to live with her friend and yakuza boss Ibari Ōzora and his family in Tokyo after she dies. Although Kōsaku is initially unsure about his situation, he is relieved when he meets Ibari's four children: Tsugumi, Tsubame, Hibari and Suzume. Kōsaku is attracted to Hibari from the start, but he is shocked to learn that Hibari, who looks and behaves as a girl, was assigned male at birth—something only known within the Ōzora Group and Hibari's family. A group of four girls led by Kaori Hanazono begin to suspect that Hibari may be transgender, but Tsubame takes Hibari's place during a health checkup, effectively quelling any suspicions. Hibari begins to show an immediate interest in Kōsaku, so in an effort to distance himself from Hibari, Kōsaku joins the Wakaba Academy boxing club. Also in the club is Makoto Shiina, who is attracted to Hibari, and Rie Kawai, the club manager who Kōsaku likes. Hibari soon joins the club as its second manager shortly before they go on a training camp in Kujūkuri at the end of the year.

At the start of the new school year, Hibari is scouted to join the girls' volleyball team after the captain, Jun Ōtori, witnesses Hibari's athletic prowess. Although Hibari refuses, Jun continues to pursue Hibari until Jun is overwhelmed by Hibari's superhuman ability to spike the ball. After Kaori and her friends try to embarrass Hibari during swim class, they once again suspect that Hibari may be a guy, but Hibari prevents them from getting any proof during the school sponsored summer camp. After Hibari refuses several advances from a popular guy at school named Takuto Honda, Hibari starts openly flirting with Kōsaku at school. Shiina becomes enraged at Kōsaku for earning Hibari's affection, but Shiina and Kōsaku grow closer as friends after they fight it out and Kōsaku reassures him that there is nothing going on between him and Hibari.

When Kōsaku is out jogging one day, he helps out a girl named Sayuri Kōenji who was being harassed by three guys from the Kokuryū High School boxing club, although Hibari deals with them before Kōsaku can do anything. Despite this, Sayuri is instantly enamored by Kōsaku and hires a detective to find out more about him, leading her to discover Hibari's secret. Hibari has another run-in with the Kokuryū boxing club members after they harass Tsubame at a festival. The Kokuryū boxing club challenges the Wakaba boxing club to some inter-school matches, but this turns out to be a ruse to get a chance to gang up on Hibari. However, the Ōzora Group intercedes, allowing Hibari to knock out the Kokuryū boxing club's leader. Sayuri transfers into Kōsaku's class, and she blackmails him into going on a date with her in exchange for not revealing Hibari's secret. During the school festival, Kōsaku's class acts out a Sleeping Beauty play with Kōsaku as the prince and Hibari as the princess, culminating in Hibari giving Kōsaku a French kiss on stage. Ibari agrees to look after Gekijirō Taiga, the son of one of his close friends, who Kōsaku is surprised to learn is a trans man.

== Characters ==
- Kōsaku Sakamoto (坂本 耕作, Sakamoto Kōsaku) is the protagonist of Stop!! Hibari-kun!! and is originally from Kumamoto.^{Ch. 33} He is a pure-hearted high school student who constantly refuses Hibari's advances toward him,^{Ch. 2, 3, 10, 17} but as time goes on, he becomes increasingly concerned that he is being influenced by Hibari.^{Ch. 8, 22, 35, 38} Kōsaku treats Hibari kindly, and helps to maintain Hibari's secret.^{Ch. 25, 50, 51} Initially unskilled at fighting,^{Ch. 3} he joins the Wakaba Academy boxing club in an effort to get stronger because of Hibari's inherent strength,^{Ch. 8} which he achieves as the series progresses.^{Ch. 38} Kōsaku is voiced by Tōru Furuya.
- Hibari Ōzora (大空 ひばり, Ōzora Hibari) is the title character of Stop!! Hibari-kun!!. Hibari is a high school student assigned male at birth who looks and behaves as a girl, much to Ibari's dismay.^{Ch. 2, 4, 8} Hibari prefers being referred to as Ibari's daughter,^{Ch. 6, 8, 15} and has expressed an interest in having breasts.^{Ch. 6} According to Suzume, Hibari becomes more feminine after Kōsaku starts living at the Ōzora household.^{Ch. 8} Hibari shows an interest in Kōsaku early on,^{Ch. 9} and continues to make advances toward him throughout the series.^{Ch. 17, 22, 35} Hibari gets bolder as the series progresses, including openly flirting with Kōsaku at school,^{Ch. 37} and kissing him.^{Ch. 18, 48, 51} Hibari is extremely athletic and intelligent, in addition to being physically strong, despite possessing a relatively small body frame.^{Ch. 5, 7, 8, 22} Hibari is voiced by Satomi Majima.
- Ibari Ōzora (大空 いばり, Ōzora Ibari) is the boss of the Ōzora Group, a yakuza organization.^{Ch. 1} As the father of Tsugumi, Tsubame, Hibari and Suzume, he wants the Ōzora Group to be family-oriented.^{Ch. 4} Ibari is extremely distressed by Hibari's usual behavior, partly because Hibari is his only choice to inherit the Ōzora Group.^{Ch. 2} He has a weak heart and frequently has heart attacks that cause him to hallucinate white alligators whenever he is overly excited or shocked by something.^{Ch. 2, 4, 8, 28} Ibari had been in love with Kōsaku's mother, but she ended up marrying a Matagi hunter.^{Ch. 19} Ibari is voiced by Jōji Yanami.
- Tsugumi Ōzora (大空 つぐみ, Ōzora Tsugumi) is the eldest daughter who has acted as a motherly figure to her family after their mother died. She dropped out of art school in her second year and became a professional illustrator.^{Ch. 31} Tsugumi is voiced by Fumi Hirano.
- Tsubame Ōzora (大空 つばめ, Ōzora Tsubame) is the second daughter and is two years older than Hibari. Like her father, Tsubame is against Hibari acting as a girl,^{Ch. 5, 7} and constantly gets mad at Hibari for wearing her clothes,^{Ch. 4, 23, 44} although Tsubame sometimes wears Hibari's clothes, too.^{Ch. 6} Tsubame and Hibari are nearly identical except for their hair and eye color, and they impersonate each other on certain occasions.^{Ch. 7, 13, 18} Tsubame is voiced by Kyōko Irokawa.
- Suzume Ōzora (大空 すずめ, Ōzora Suzume) is the youngest daughter and is a precocious elementary school student.^{Ch. 14, 19, 48} She is scared of flat-faced men.^{Ch. 4, 28} Suzume is voiced by Tomiko Suzuki.
- Sabu (サブ) is a member of the Ōzora Group. He is in love with Tsugumi.^{Ch. 32} Sabu is voiced by Norio Wakamoto.
- Seiji (政二) is a member of the Ōzora Group. He looks scary, but he has a timid personality.^{Ch. 2, 4, 18} He scares Kōsaku awake in the mornings.^{Ch. 6, 9, 20} Seiji is voiced by Toku Nishio.
- Makoto Shiina (椎名 まこと, Shiina Makoto) is Kōsaku's classmate who likes Hibari.^{Ch. 3, 12} He is a member of the boxing club, and initially hates Kōsaku for earning Hibari's affection,^{Ch. 8} but as the series progresses, the two become friends.^{Ch. 38} Shiina is voiced by Katsuji Mori.
- Rie Kawai (可愛 理絵, Kawai Rie) is a normal girl with a gentle personality who is attracted to Shiina.^{Ch. 12} She joined the boxing club as a manager because of him.^{Ch. 17} She leaves the boxing club when she learns Shiina likes Hibari,^{Ch. 30} but she rejoins the club after she gets over him.^{Ch. 50} Rie is voiced by Hiromi Tsuru.
- Mitsuo Kaji (梶 みつを, Kaji Mitsuwo) is one of Tsubame's classmates and is the boxing club captain.^{Ch. 10, 13} He is an overbearing guy and is very pushy towards Tsubame whom he likes.^{Ch. 13, 18} His family members have the same face as him.^{Ch. 18} He is voiced by Kōzō Shioya.
- Kaori Hanazono (花園 かおり, Hanzono Kaori) is Kōsaku's classmate.^{Ch. 23} She is jealous of Hibari's popularity at school,^{Ch. 6} and takes pride in her devious personality.^{Ch. 7, 27} Along with her three friends, they try to embarrass Hibari.^{Ch. 24, 27} Kaori is voiced by Seiko Nakano.
- Sayuri Kōenji (高円寺 さゆり, Kōenji Sayuri) is a rich girl one year younger than Kōsaku.^{Ch. 50} She falls in love easily and will do anything she can to bring her love to fruition. When something surprises her, she composes a haiku.^{Ch. 43} Sayuri is voiced by Yuriko Yamamoto.

== Media ==
=== Manga ===
The Stop!! Hibari-kun! Complete Edition volumes feature newly drawn cover art by Hisashi Eguchi. The third volume depicts Kōsaku (left) and Hibari (right).

Stop!! Hibari-kun! is written and illustrated by Hisashi Eguchi. Following the conclusion of his manga Hinomaru Gekijō (ひのまる劇場) in 1981, Eguchi wanted to go against the notion at the time that there was currently a golden age of romantic comedy manga in shōnen manga magazines. In response, Eguchi thought of creating a romantic comedy manga where the main female character is a cross-dressing boy, and in doing so, poke fun at the genre by developing it as the antithesis of a romantic comedy. Eguchi drew up the storyboard for the first chapter in about 30 minutes in a cafe, and came up with the title Stop!! Hibari-kun! as a reference to Hisashi Sekiya's manga Stop! Nii-chan (ストップ! にいちゃん). In wanting to highlight the comedy of having a character like Hibari, Eguchi realized that the cuter he could draw Hibari, the more effective the jokes would be, so he tried to draw Hibari as cute as he could.

Eguchi had often rushed when drawing his earlier manga Susume!! Pirates (すすめ!!パイレーツ), but starting with Stop!! Hibari-kun!, he raised the standards he held for his art and began taking more time to draw the chapters. In addition, Eguchi was very particular about the appearance of his manuscripts, so he never used white-out to correct any drawing errors because he disliked how it looked. As the serialization continued, Eguchi found it increasingly difficult to keep up a weekly pace for the chapters, leading him to take frequent hiatuses and later say that "drawing weekly isn't something humans can do." Furthermore, the editor-in-chief of Weekly Shōnen Jump at the time, Shigeo Nishimura, refused his request to release the chapters every other week. When it came time to draw what would end up being the last serialized chapter, Eguchi completed the chapter's storyboard, but ultimately submitted only about two-thirds of the chapter, leaving out the last five pages. After he submitted the chapter's manuscript, Eguchi fled to a hotel and secluded himself for a day, only coming out after Nishimura called him to say that he could not deal with him anymore on a weekly basis. As a result, Eguchi abandoned the serialization and the editorial department decided to discontinue the series.

Stop!! Hibari-kun! was serialized in the manga magazine Weekly Shōnen Jump from the October 19, 1981, issue to the November 28, 1983, issue. The individual chapters were collected and published in four tankōbon volumes by Shueisha from November 1982 to January 1984. Inspired by Katsuhiro Otomo, Eguchi fought against the established design format for the volumes that at the time was "set in stone" for series serialized in Weekly Shōnen Jump. Futabasha later published it in three volumes in July 1991, and again in two volumes in February 1995. Shueisha republished it in four volumes from May to June 2001. Home-sha published it in two volumes in January 2004. In an interview in 2007, Eguchi expressed a desire to continue some of his older series, but stated that a continuation of Stop!! Hibari-kun! would be difficult.

Starting in 2009, Eguchi began working with Shogakukan on releasing a Stop!! Hibari-kun! Complete Edition omnibus collection, which features various revisions to the originally published chapters in addition to newly drawn cover art. Not wanting to end the Complete Edition with an abrupt conclusion like he had done before, Eguchi found the storyboard for the final chapter and used it as a basis to newly draw the last five pages he had omitted 27 years earlier. Shogakukan published the Complete Edition in three volumes from July 2009 to February 2010; Shogakukan later republished the series in another three volumes from May to July 2012. In 2010, Eguchi did not rule out the possibility of someday drawing a continuation of the series, but he said it probably would not be a story under the title Stop!! Hibari-kun!.

The series was formerly digitally available in English by NTT Solmare since 2010. In August 2024, Peow2 announced that it had licensed the series and the first volume is set to be released in Q4 2025.

=== Anime ===
A 35-episode anime television series adaptation, produced by Toei Animation and directed by Takashi Hisaoka. It aired from May 20, 1983, to January 27, 1984, on Fuji Television. The screenplay was written by: Shigeru Yanagawa, Tokio Tsuchiya, Hiroshi Toda, Tomomi Tsutsui, Takeshi Shudo and Yumi Asano. The character design used in the anime was provided by Yoshinori Kanemori, and the music was composed by Kōji Nishimura. The series was later released by Universal J to two DVD compilation volumes from February to March 2003. A DVD box set was released by TC Entertainment in September 2014. The opening theme is "Stop!! Hibari-kun!" (ストップ!! ひばりくん!) sung by Yuki Yukino and the ending theme is "Kongara Connection" (コンガラ・コネクション) sung by Ai Hoshino.

== Reception and legacy ==
Psychologist Tamaki Saitō described Stop!! Hibari-kun! as achieving a "dizzying reality" with Hibari "by contrasting a girlish exterior with a male interior", and went on to say that the series could be seen as a "continuation of the sartorial perversion lineage" of cross-dressing characters. Manga critic Haruyuki Nakano has called Stop!! Hibari-kun! a unique and outstanding gag manga for its juxtaposition of Hibari being a boy and the heir to a yakuza organization. Nakano largely attributes this successful combination to Eguchi's ability to draw girls that are not only cute, but also have good taste and sex appeal. The delicate touch in how Hibari is drawn has been described as so attractive that it makes the reader forget that it is a gag manga.

That was back when I was in elementary school and just when I was starting to fuss over fashion. I used to drag my mom around for hours to just buy one T-shirt, but instead of getting fashion tips from the TV or from magazines, I got it from Hibari-kun.

— Yuki

In writing for the magazine Cyzo, manga critic Jyamao wrote that because of its overall light and pop literary style, none of the indecency or immorality cross-dressing may engender comes through, which he surmises is why the anime was able to air during prime time. Jyamao notes the more extreme nature of the jokes surrounding the yakuza characters in comparison to the jokes involving cross-dressing, and that some jokes such as those involving drugs would not be humorous today. Manga commentator Nobunaga Minami lauded Eguchi for being a pioneer in drawing characters with a high fashion sense in Stop!! Hibari-kun!, which he says effectively changed fashion in shōnen manga from being seen as a "symbol" to now being treated as an "accessory". Eguchi's attention to detail is also praised, such as drawing Kōsaku wearing Chuck Taylor All-Stars in one chapter.

The series has been described as "effervescent," and as helping pave the way for the J-pop phenomenon. When Tegami Bachi author Hiroyuki Asada read Stop!! Hibari-kun! in junior high school, he admired its novel sensibility, and Eguchi's art also influenced him. According to Eguchi, some people who read Stop!! Hibari-kun! were influenced to start cross-dressing.

In a 2026 review for Aftermath, journalist Janus Rose described the manga as a positive representation of a transgender woman character, saying that "unlike virtually every other depiction of trans people from that period, the gag is not the fact that Hibari is trans—it's other characters' cartoonish inability to chill out and be normal about it." Rose also noted that the manga had regained popularity among modern transgender audiences, and that "in 2026, at a time when trans people face unprecedented violence and existential threats from the highest levels of government, Hibari represents the ultimate trans power fantasy: being able to control your own narrative and live a normal life." Rose praised the manga for subverting negative tropes surrounding trans characters, although she noted that it is unlikely that Eguchi originally intended for Hibari to be positive transgender representation. She stated that "Hibari is a positive trans character not because she is a realistic depiction of a trans woman (she isn't), but because she refuses to allow her identity and narrative to be controlled by others".

== Notes ==
- These chapters correspond to those in the Stop!! Hibari-kun! Complete Edition volumes.
