= Sanbu, Chiba =

Sanbu 山武町
- Former municipality
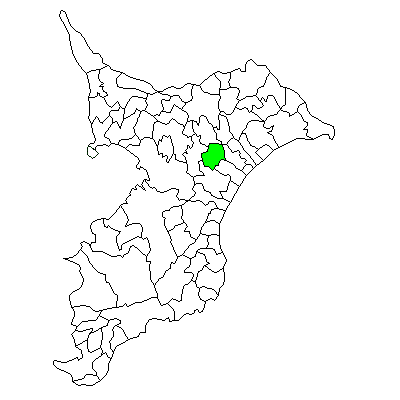
- Location of Sanbu in Chiba Prefecture

- Location in Japan
- Coordinates: 35°38′27″N 140°22′12″E
- Country: Japan
- Region: Kantō
- Prefecture: Chiba Prefecture
- District: Sanbu
- Merged: March 27, 2006 (now part of Sanmu)

Area
  - Total: 52.05 km^{2} (20.10 sq mi)

Population (February 1, 2006)
  - Total: 19,779
  - Density: 380/km^{2} (980/sq mi)
- Time zone: UTC+09:00 (JST)
- Symbols
- Flower: Lilium auratum
- Tree: Cryptomeria

Sambu (山武町, Sanbu-machi) was a town located in Sanbu District, Chiba Prefecture, Japan.

Sanbu Town was formed on March 1, 1955 through the merger of the villages of Mutsuoka and Hyūga.

On March 27, 2006, Sanbu, along with the towns of Matsuo and Narutō, and the village of Hasunuma (all from Sanbu District), was merged to create the city of Sanmu, and thus no longer exists as an independent municipality.

The city name of Sanmu is written with the same kanji as Sambu, but is pronounced differently.

As of February 1, 2006, (the last census data prior to the merger) the town had an estimated population of 19,779 and a population density of 380 persons per km^{2}. The total area was 52.05 km^{2}.
