= Matsuo, Chiba =

Matsuo 松尾町
- Former municipality
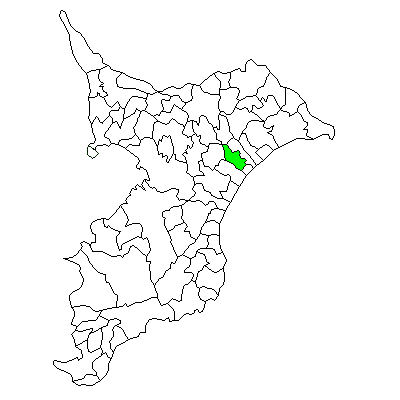
- Location of Matsuo in Chiba Prefecture

- Location in Japan
- Coordinates: 35.633°N 140.467°E
- Country: Japan
- Region: Kantō
- Prefecture: Chiba Prefecture
- District: Sanbu
- Merged: March 27, 2006 (now part of Sanmu)

Area
  - Total: 37.59 km^{2} (14.51 sq mi)

Population (November 1, 2005)
  - Total: 11,121
  - Density: 296/km^{2} (770/sq mi)
- Time zone: UTC+09:00 (JST)

Matsuo (松尾町, Matsuo-machi) was a town located in Sanbu District, Chiba Prefecture, Japan.

Matsuo Village was formed on April 1, 1889 within Musha District. Musha District became part of Sanbu District from April 1, 1897. On August 31, 1898, Matsuo was raised to town status. It expanded through the annexation of the neighboring villages of Ohira and Toyooka on February 1, 1955.

On March 27, 2006, Matsuo, along with the towns of Narutō and Sanbu, and the village of Hasunuma (all from Sanbu District), was merged to create the city of Sanmu, and thus no longer exists as an independent municipality.

As of November 1, 2005, (the last census data prior to the merger) the town had an estimated population of 11,121 and a population density of 296 persons per km^{2}. The total area was 37.59 km^{2}.
