= Narutō, Chiba =

Narutō 成東町
- Former municipality
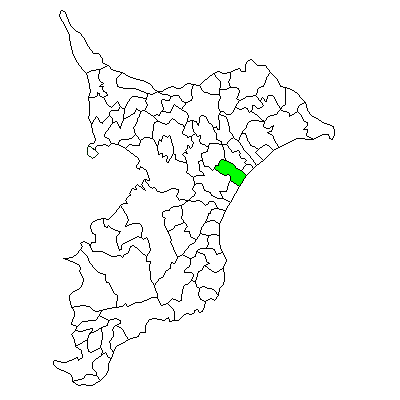
- Location of Narutō in Chiba Prefecture

- Location in Japan
- Coordinates: 35°35′11″N 140°24′49″E
- Country: Japan
- Region: Kantō
- Prefecture: Chiba Prefecture
- District: Sanbu
- Merged: March 27, 2006 (now part of Sanmu)

Area
  - Total: 47.02 km^{2} (18.15 sq mi)

Population (November 1, 2005)
  - Total: 24,677
  - Density: 525/km^{2} (1,360/sq mi)
- Time zone: UTC+09:00 (JST)
- Symbols
- Flower: Chrysanthemum
- Tree: Oleander

Narutō (成東町, Narutō-machi) was a town located in Sanbu District, Chiba Prefecture, Japan.

Narutō Town was established on April 1, 1889 within Musha District. Musha District became part of Sanbu District from April 1, 1897. On October 1, 1954 Narutō expanded through the annexation of the neighboring villages of Ōtomi and Nangō, and the village of Midorimi on July 1, 1955.

On March 27, 2006, Narutō, along with the towns of Matsuo and Sanbu, and the village of Hasunuma (all from Sanbu District), was merged to create the city of Sanmu, and thus no longer exists as an independent municipality.

As of November 1, 2005, (the last census data prior to the merger) the town had an estimated population of 24,677 and a population density of 525 inhabitants per square kilometer (1,360/sq mi). The total area was 47.02 km^{2} (18.15 sq mi).
