= Sanmu =

Sanmu 山武市
- City
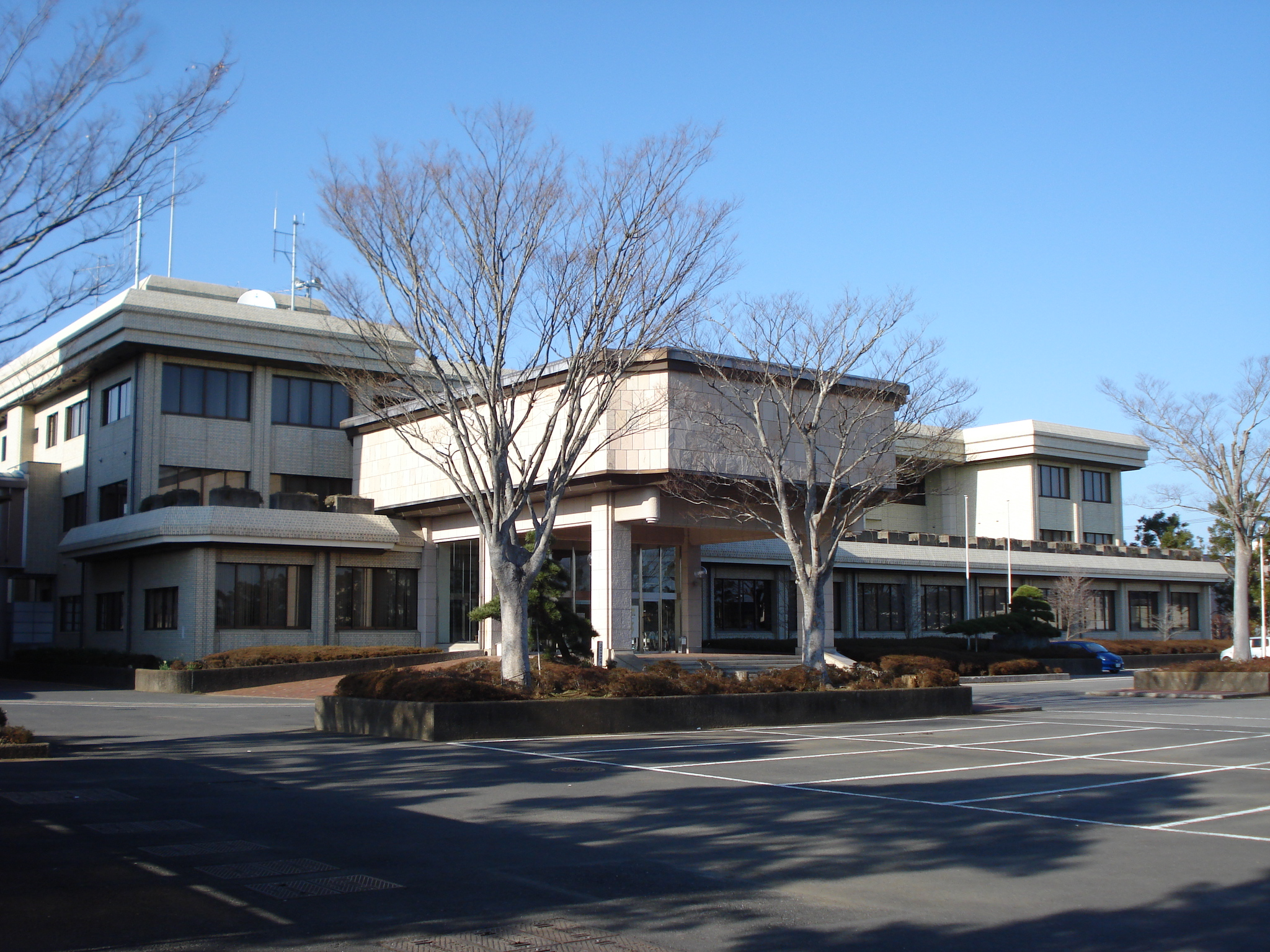
- Sanmu City Hall

- Flag Emblem

- Location of Sanmu in Chiba Prefecture

- Coordinates: 35°36′N 140°25′E
- Country: Japan
- Region: Kantō
- Prefecture: Chiba

Area
  - Total: 146.38 km^{2} (56.52 sq mi)

Population (November 1, 2020)
  - Total: 50,321
  - Density: 343.77/km^{2} (890.36/sq mi)
- Time zone: UTC+9 (Japan Standard Time)
- Symbols
  - Tree: Cryptomeria
  - Flower: Chrysanthemum
  - Bird: Japanese bush-warbler
- Phone number: 0475-80-1112
- Address: 296 Maidai, Sanmu-shi, Chiba-ken 289-1392
- Website: Official website

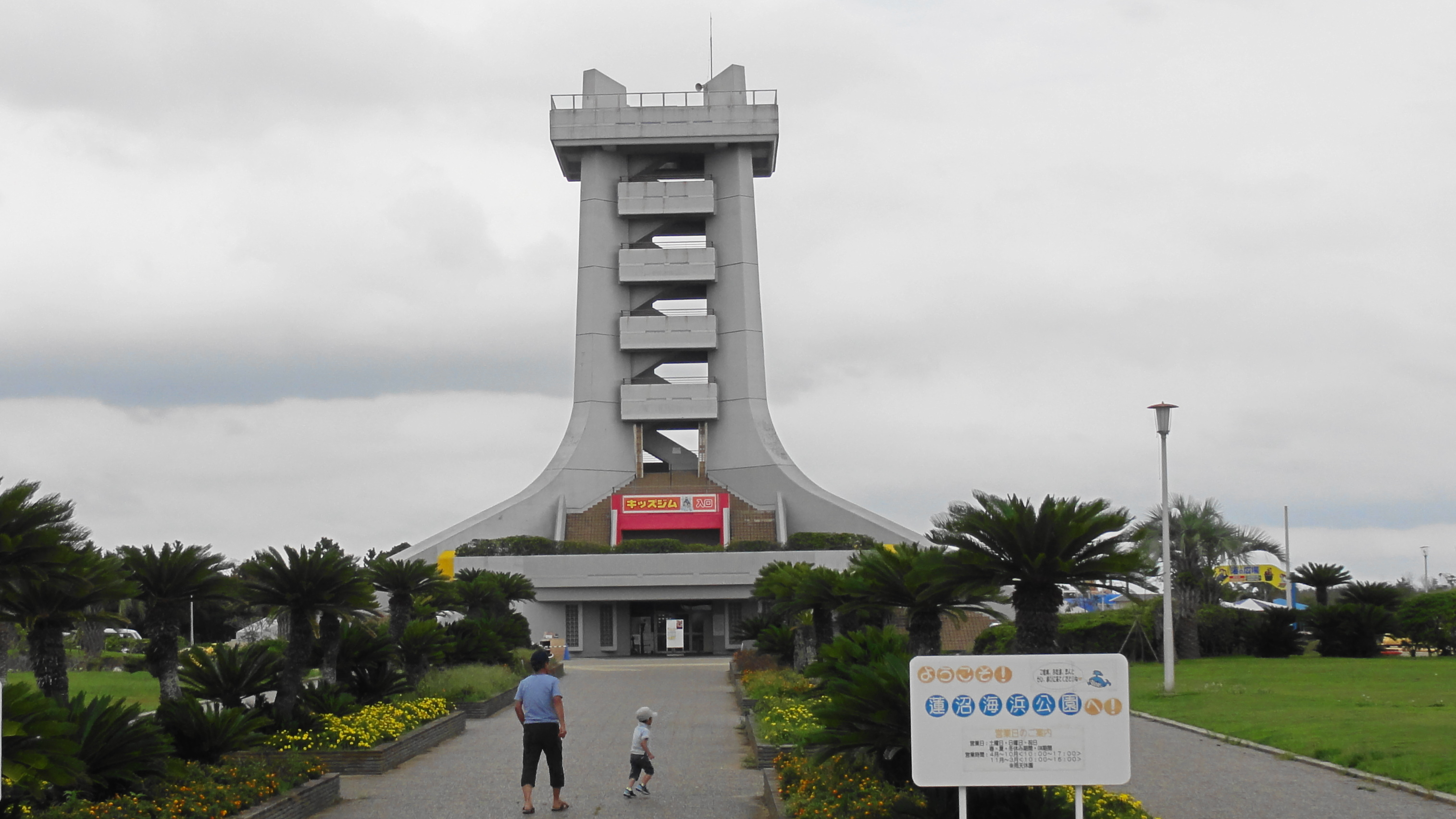
Hasunuma Seaside Park

Sanmu (山武市, Sanmu-shi) is a city located in Chiba Prefecture, Japan. As of 1 November 2020, the city had an estimated population of 50,321 in 22,397 households and a population density of 340 inhabitants per square kilometre (880/sq mi). The total area of the city is 146.38 square kilometres (56.52 sq mi).

== Geography ==
Sanmu is located in the northeastern part of Chiba prefecture, about 30 kilometres (19 mi) from the prefectural capital of Chiba and about 60 to 70 kilometres (37 to 43 mi) from the center of Tokyo. It is included in the urban employment area of Tokyo metropolis. Most of the city is located in the flatlands of the Kujūkuri Plain, which runs from the center to the south of Kujūkuri Beach, one of Japan's leading sandy beaches, and faces the Pacific Ocean for about 8 kilometres (5.0 mi).

=== Surrounding municipalities ===
Chiba Prefecture

- Kujūkuri
- Shibayama
- Tōgane
- Tomisato
- Yachimata
- Yokoshibahikari

=== Climate ===
Sanmu has a humid subtropical climate (Köppen Cfa) characterized by warm summers and cool winters with light to no snowfall. The average annual temperature in Sanmu is 14.8 °C. The average annual rainfall is 1550 mm with September as the wettest month. The temperatures are highest on average in August, at around 25.9 °C, and lowest in January, at around 4.8 °C.

== Demographics ==
Per Japanese census data, the population of Sanmu peaked around the year 2000 and has declined since.

Historical population
Year	Pop.	±%
1950	51,032	—
1960	46,055	−9.8%
1970	42,377	−8.0%
1980	43,954	+3.7%
1990	50,692	+15.3%
2000	60,614	+19.6%
2010	56,089	−7.5%
2020	48,444	−13.6%

== History ==
The area of Sanmu was part of ancient Kazusa Province. The city of Sanmu was established on March 27, 2006, from the merger of the towns of Sanbu, Matsuo and Narutō, and the village of Hasunuma (all from Sanbu District). The kanji for the city name are the same as for the former town of Sanbu, but is pronounced differently. Sanmu was damaged by a tsunami as a result of the 2011 Tōhoku earthquake and tsunami, with 43 buildings destroyed and 438 buildings partially destroyed, but with only one fatality.

== Government ==
Sanmu has a mayor-council form of government with a directly elected mayor and a unicameral city council of 20 members. Sanmu contributes one member to the Chiba Prefectural Assembly. In terms of national politics, the city is part of Chiba 11th district of the lower house of the Diet of Japan.

== Economy ==
Due to mixed plantings of Japanese red pine, Japanese cypress, and Japanese cedar, Sanmu was a center of wood production until 1923 at the end of the Taishō period. Many in the town remain active in the woodworking and carpentry trade. Small-scale agriculture in Sanmu produces a variety of fruits and vegetables, but the town is noted for carrots, watermelon, peanuts. The town also attracts tourists to its numerous strawberry farms. Sanmu serves as a bedroom community for nearby Chiba and Tokyo, and housing development continues in the city.

== Education ==
Sanmu has 13 public elementary schools and six public middle schools operated by the city government, and two public high schools operated by the Chiba Prefectural Board of Education

== Transportation ==
=== Railway ===
JR East – Sōbu Main Line

- Hyūga - Narutō - Matsuo

JR East – Tōgane Line

- Narutō

=== Highway ===
- Tokyo Bay Aqua-Line
- Ken-Ō Expressway
- Chiba-Tōgane Road
- National Route 126

== Noted people from Sanmu ==
- Kumiko Asō, actress
- Itō Sachio, Writer
- Aoi Yuki, actress

== Gallery ==
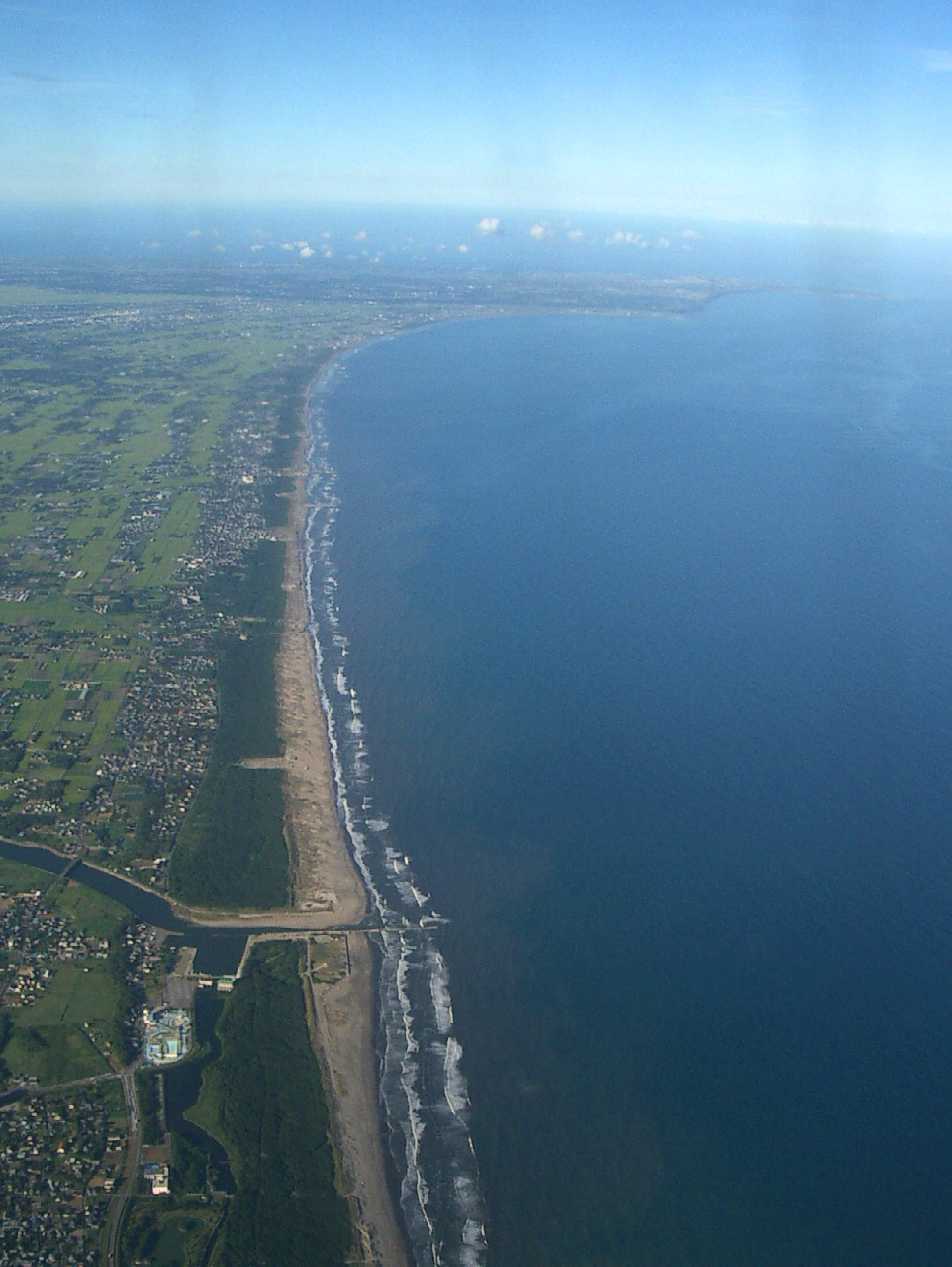
Aerial view of Sanmu and Kujūkuri Beach

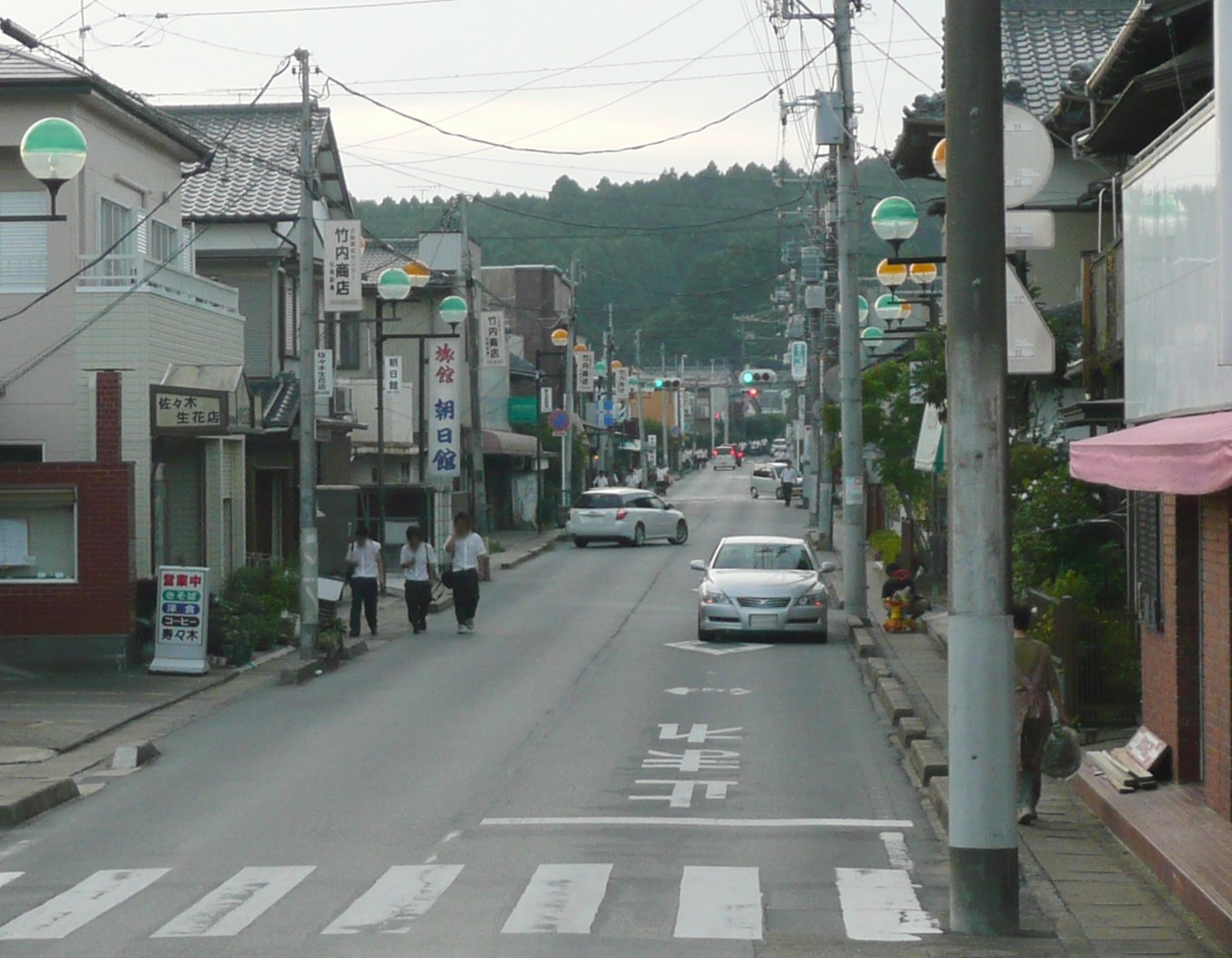
Street view of Sanmu

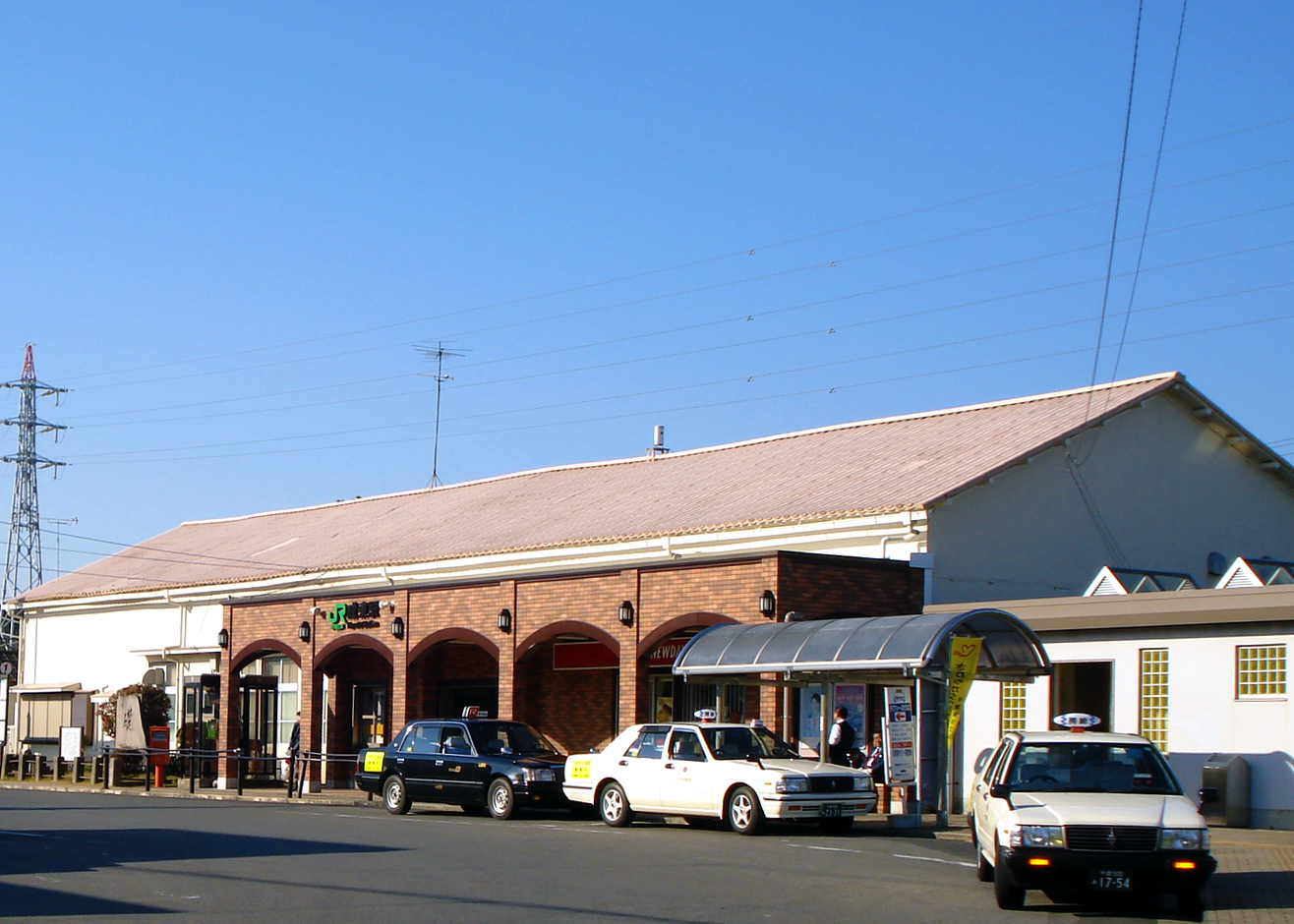
Narutō Station

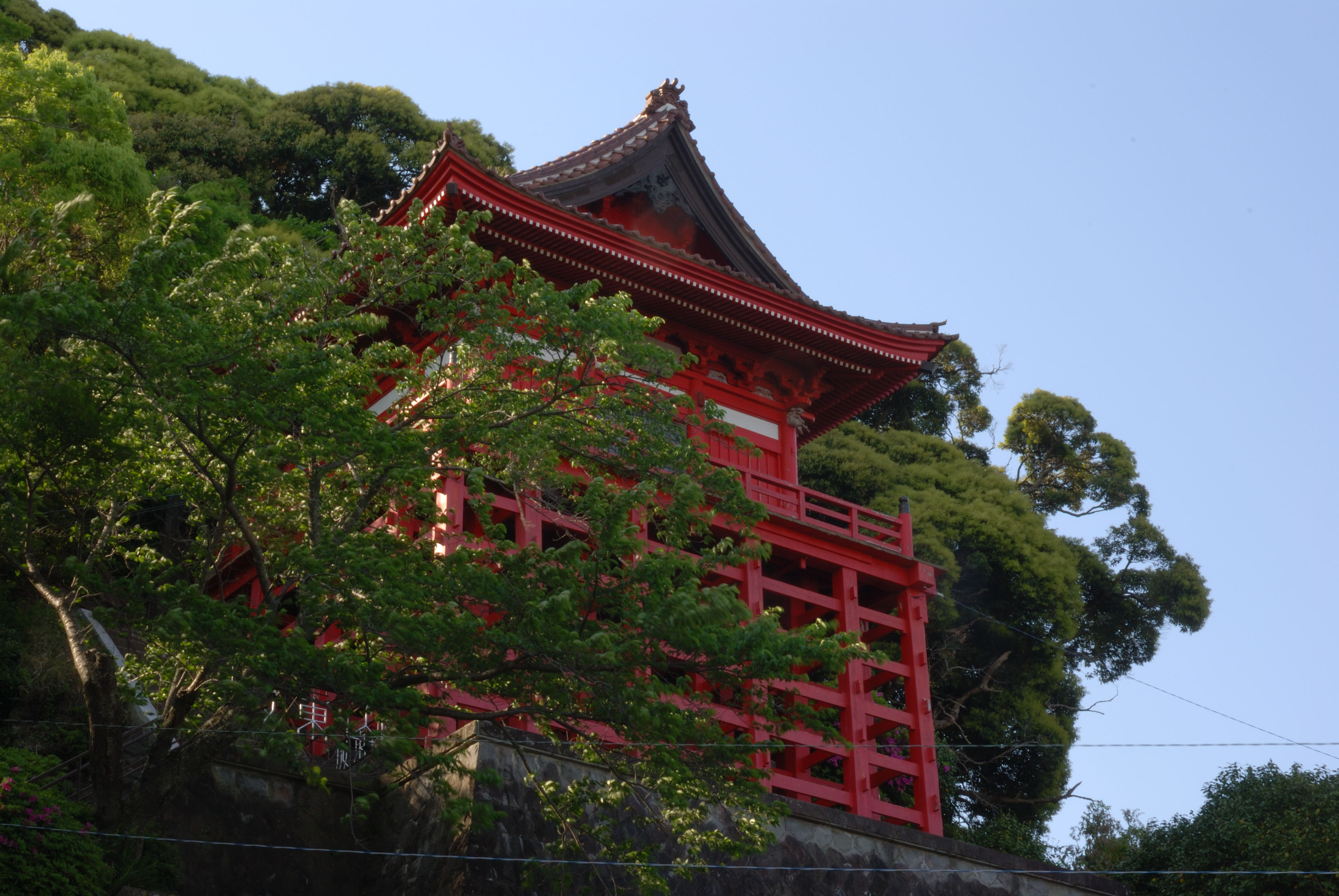
Hondō of Fudō-in Chōshō-ji

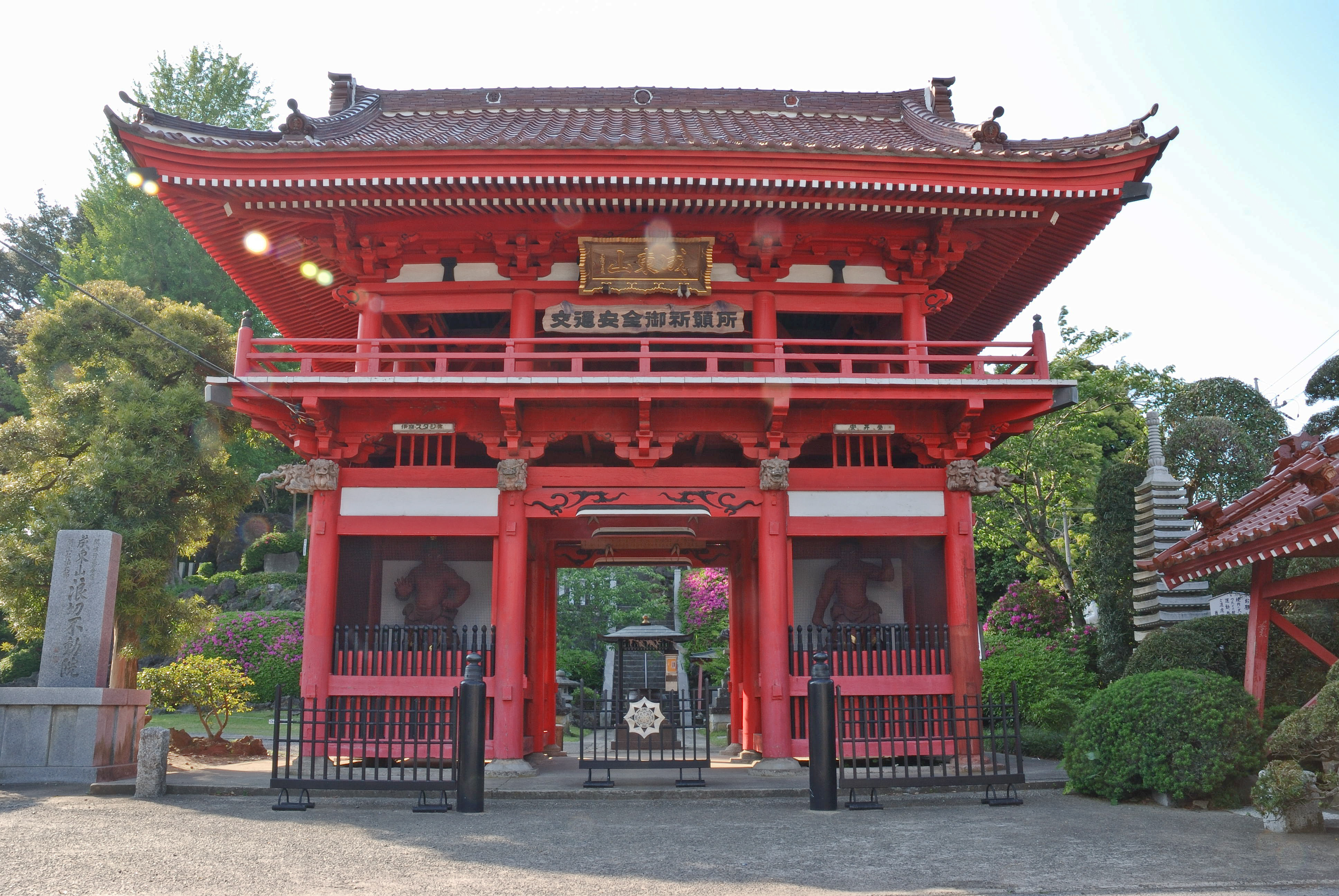
Niōmon of Fudō-in Chōshō-ji
