= Hisashi Eguchi =

Japanese manga artist

Hisashi Eguchi 江口 寿史
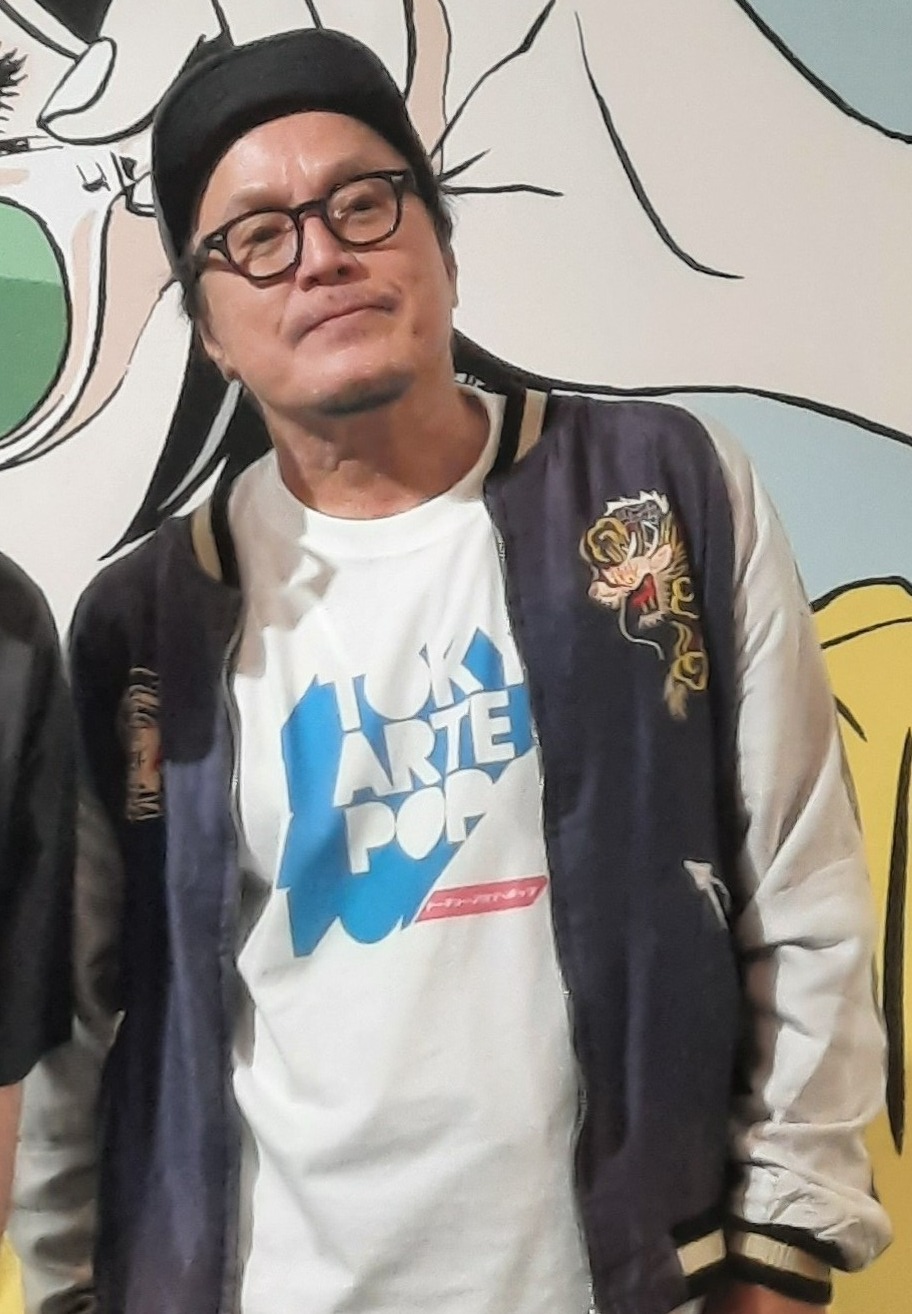
- Eguchi in 2023
- Born: March 29, 1956 (age 70) Minamata, Kumamoto, Japan
- Areas: Manga artist, illustrator
- Pseudonym: Candy
- Notable works: Stop!! Hibari-kun!
- Awards: 38th Bungeishunjū Manga Award (1992)
- Spouse: Mari Mizutani (ja:水谷麻里) (1990–present)

Hisashi Eguchi (江口 寿史, Eguchi Hisashi; born March 29, 1956) is a Japanese manga artist and one of Japan's most prominent illustrators of female characters. He made his professional manga debut with Susume!! Pirates (Note: すすめ!!パイレーツ, Susume!! Pairētsu) in the manga anthology Weekly Shōnen Jump in 1977. Other notable works include Stop!! Hibari-kun! (Note: ストップ!! ひばりくん!, Sutoppu!! Hibari-kun!) (adapted into an anime television series in 1983), and the gag series Charamono. (Note: キャラ者, Kyara mono) Eguchi married idol Mari Mizutani (ja:水谷麻里) in 1990.

== Biography ==
Hisashi Eguchi is known for his female character illustrations and fashion awareness.

Eguchi began drawing at an early age, fascinated by the then-starting Japanese TV broadcasting. He got to know manga through Osamu Tezuka's Astro Boy. During his childhood, other superheroes like Ultraman and Ultra Seven also gripped him.

In 1977, he won the Young Jump award (Twelve Newcomers Manga Award (Note: 十二傑新人漫画賞, Jū ni suguru shinjin manga shō) since 2003) for Osorubeki Kodomotachi (Note: 恐るべき子ども達). That same year, his Hachi-jihan no Kettō (Note: 8時半の決闘) was a finalist at Akatsuka. The publication of Hisashi's baseball manga Susume!! Pirates followed in 1979 as a reward for winning the Young Jump contest.

After deciding to become a professional manga artist, Eguchi began drawing female characters: "I thought it was strange not to have girls. Also, I knew that it would be popular if the girls were cute." In the animation field, he worked as a character designer for Roujin Z, Mujin Wakusei Survive, and Otaku no Seiza and had the anime Eguchi Hisashi no Kotobuki Goro Show based on his work. Eguchi used his now current wife as a model for Roujin Z's Haruko. Perfect Blue characters were based on Hisashi's designs. In 1990, the short story manga collection Nantoka Narudesho! (Note: 江口寿史のなんとかなるでショ!, Eguchi Hisashi No Nantoka Narudesho!) was adapted into an OVA, which mixed anime, live action and puppetry. Eguchi (on his favorite scene): "[Nantoka Narudesho] was a story of a blind girl, and it's dark all the way through. The dark scene continues for a long period of time. I heard that animator had a hard time. It was all black and he used various ideas for that."

Eguchi has stated that American pop art has been an influence on his work, citing artists such as Roy Lichtenstein and Andy Warhol. He has also cited European cartoonists Moebius and Hergé as figures who have influenced his work. Eguchi describes his style as simple: "I like to use organized lines. The less lines the better".

In 1994, Eguchi founded Comic Cue, an alternative yearly manga magazine: "I wanted to make something like the all-star game in baseball. Or Avengers. All-hero, I wanted to have a festival of Avengers. All the heroes! With all my favorite artists". Katsuhiro Otomo was a contributor to the first issue.

== Music ==
Eguchi has contributed illustrations for the jackets of several music releases, including:

- Ging Nang Boyz – Kimi to Boku no Dai 3ji Taisen-teki Renai Kakumei (2005)
- Shiggy Jr. – Listen To The Music (2014)
- Tokyo Ska Paradise Orchestra – Uso wo Tsuku Kuchibiru (2015)
- Shiggy Jr. – All About Pop (2016)
- Seiko Oomori – Muteki (2017)
- Roujin Z Soundtrack 30th Anniversary Soundtrack (2021)
- Nicely Nice – The Adventures of Nicely Nice (2022)
- Pictured Resort – Once Upon A Season (2023)

== Advertising ==
Eguchi's eye on beauty and fashion has granted him several jobs in advertising:

- Real Wine Guide (Note: リアルワインガイド, Riaru wain gaido) covers
- Flyers to promote his home town, Minamata
- Hisashi Eguchi x atré "My Favorite Town. Kichijōji"
- Denon D-F07 manual cover
- Denny's Japan
- Kanebo Ltd. Xanax
- Acer Inc. Intel Core i5
- Renai Koza Real Age (Note: 恋愛講座 リアルエイジ, Renai Kōza Real Age) PlayStation game
- Several Telephone card designs

== Notes ==
Japanese
