= Kansei calendar =

Japanese lunisolar calendar

Kansei calendar (寛政暦, Kansei-reki) was a Japanese lunisolar calendar (genka reki). It was published in 1797.

== History ==
The Kansei-reki system was the work of Takahashi Yoshitoki and Hazama Shigetomi.

Takahashi and Hazama used Western astronomy studies to modify the traditional calendar.

== See also ==
- Japanese calendar
- Sexagenary cycle
- Kansei
