= Tenpō calendar =

Japanese lunisolar calendar

Today (at UTC+00)
- Wednesday, 24 June 2026
- Japanese: 10 Satsuki, Reiwa 8 (Geshi, 13 days until Shōsho)
Other calendars
| Armenian | 9 Hrotich 1475 |
| Bengali | 10 Asharh, BS 1433 |
| Chinese | Yin Earth Snake・Chariot Mansion; 11 Wǔyuè, Bǐngwǔnián (Xiazhi, 13 days until Xiaoshu) |
| Common Era | 24 June 2026 CE |
| Coptic | 17 Paoni, AM 1742 |
| Egyptian | 9 Athyr, NE 2775 |
| Ethiopian | 17 Sanē, AD 2018 |
| French Republican | Décade I, Sextidi de Messidor de l'Année 234 de la République |
| Gregorian | 24 June, AD 2026 |
| Hebrew | 9 Tammuz, AM 5786 |
| Islamic | 8 Muharram, AH 1448 (tabular method) |
| ISO week date | 2026-W26-3 |
| Julian | 11 June, AD 2026 (AM 7534) |
| Julian day | 2461216 |
| Maya | 13.0.13.12.13; 6 Tzec, 10 Ben |
| Roman | ante diem III Idus Iunias, AUC 2779 |
| Solar Hijri | 3 Tir, SH 1405 |

The Tenpō calendar (天保暦, Tenpō-reki), officially known as the Tenpō sexagenary unitary calendar (天保壬寅元暦 Tenpō jin'in genreki), was a Japanese lunisolar calendar. It was published in the Tenpō era (1830–1844). It remained in use throughout the late Edo period, from 1844 to 1872.

== History ==
The Tenpō-reki system was developed by Shibukawa Kagesuke. It was the last calendar system devised by Japanese astronomers and mathematicians.

== Overview ==
The Tenpō calendar is a lunisolar system which adopted the Teiki-hō method, dividing solar terms by solar longitude instead of time, unlike the previous Heiki-hō method. It begins each lunar month on the day of the new moon and adds a leap month when necessary, specifically when three lunar months occur between a solstice and equinox. Out of those three months, the one without a chūki 中気 is designated the leap month. Solstice and equinox consistently fall within the second, fifth, eighth and eleventh months. Observations from Kyoto dictates the time used for determining solar terms and lunar phases.

Unlike previous calendars with uniform hours lengths, the Tenpō calendars hour vary seasonally, posing the length of hours changed depending on the time of year. This made it extremely challenging to make Japanese mechanical clocks.

The Tenpō calendar is no longer officially maintained.

== See also ==
- Japanese calendar
- Sexagenary cycle
- Tenpō
