= Sanbu District =

District in Chiba prefecture, Japan

Coordinates: 35.638°N 140.514°E

Location of Sanbu District in Chiba Prefecture

Sanbu District (山武郡, Sanbu-gun) is a district located in Chiba Prefecture, Japan. As of January 2013, the district had a population of 49,488 and a population density of 369 persons per km^{2}. The total area is 134.1 square kilometres (51.8 mi^{2}).

== Towns and villages ==
- Kujūkuri
- Shibayama
- Yokoshibahikari

=== Elevation of Ōamishirasato to city status ===
Ōamishirasato, formerly a town in Sanbu District, was elevated to city status on January 1, 2013, and is no longer part of Sanbu District.

== History ==
During the early Meiji period establishment of the municipality system on April 1, 1889, the districts of Yamabe District (山辺郡, Yamabe-gun) with 3 towns and 14 villages, and Musha District (武射郡, Musha-gun) with 1 towns and 14 villages were created in what was formerly the north-eastern portion of Kazusa Province. The two districts were formally merged into the new Sanbu District on April 1, 1897.

== Mergers ==
- On March 27, 2006, the towns of Sanbu, Naruto, Hasunuma and Matsuo merged to form the new city of Sanmu.
- On March 27, 2006, the town of Yokoshiba merged with Hikari from Sōsa District to form the new town of Yokoshibahikari in Sanbu District.
