= Kujūkuri =

Kujūkuri 九十九里町
- Town
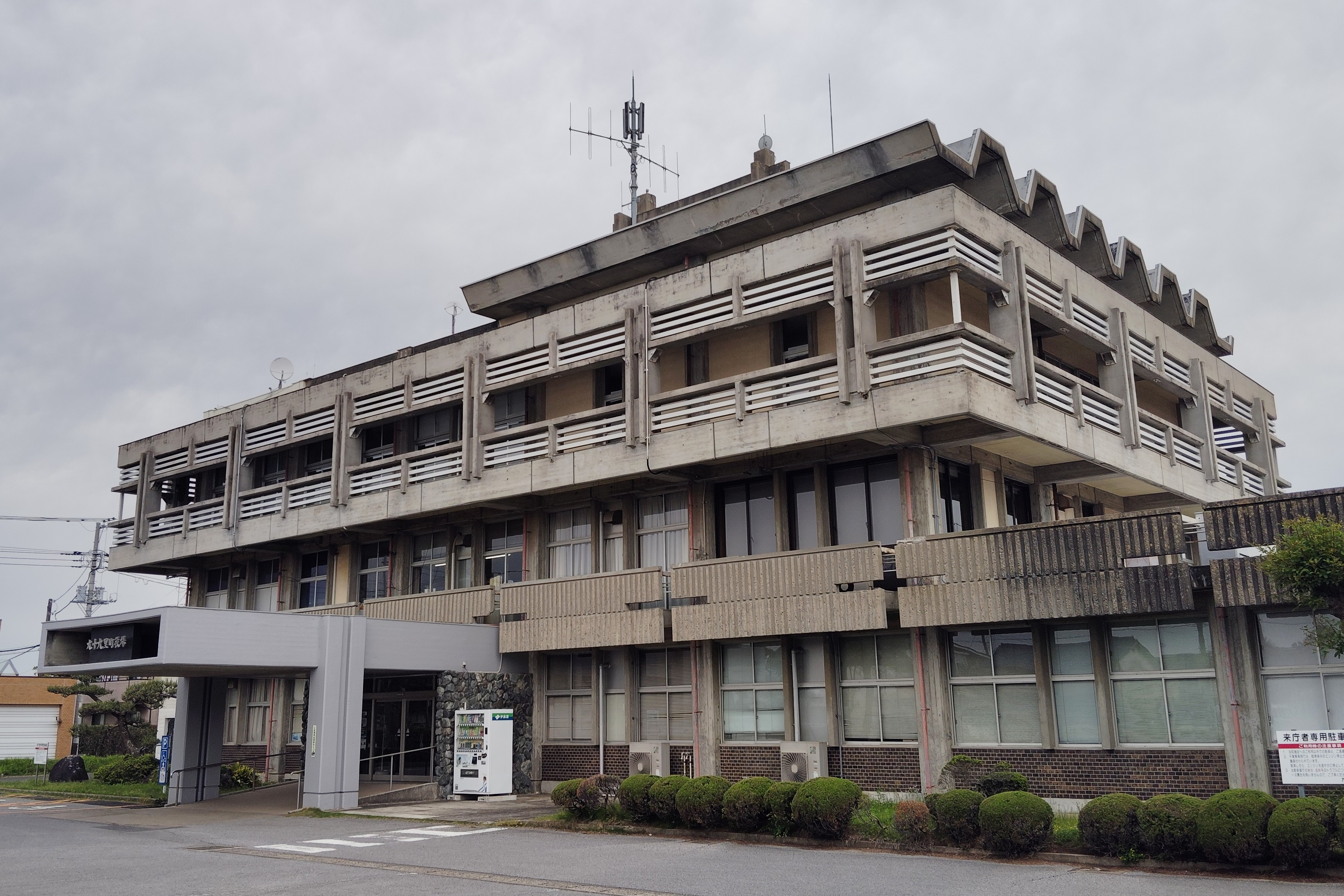
- Kujūkuri Town hall

- Flag Seal

- Location of Kujūkuri in Chiba Prefecture

- Coordinates: 35°32′N 140°26′E
- Country: Japan
- Region: Kantō
- Prefecture: Chiba
- District: Sanbu

Area
  - Total: 23.72 km^{2} (9.16 sq mi)

Population (December 1, 2020)
  - Total: 15,343
  - Density: 646.8/km^{2} (1,675/sq mi)
- Time zone: UTC+9 (Japan Standard Time)
- City symbols
  - Tree: Japanese black pine
  - Bird: Kentish plover
- Phone number: 0475-70-3100
- Address: 4099 Katagai, Kujūkuri-machi, Sanbu-gun, Chiba-ken 283-0195
- Website: Official website

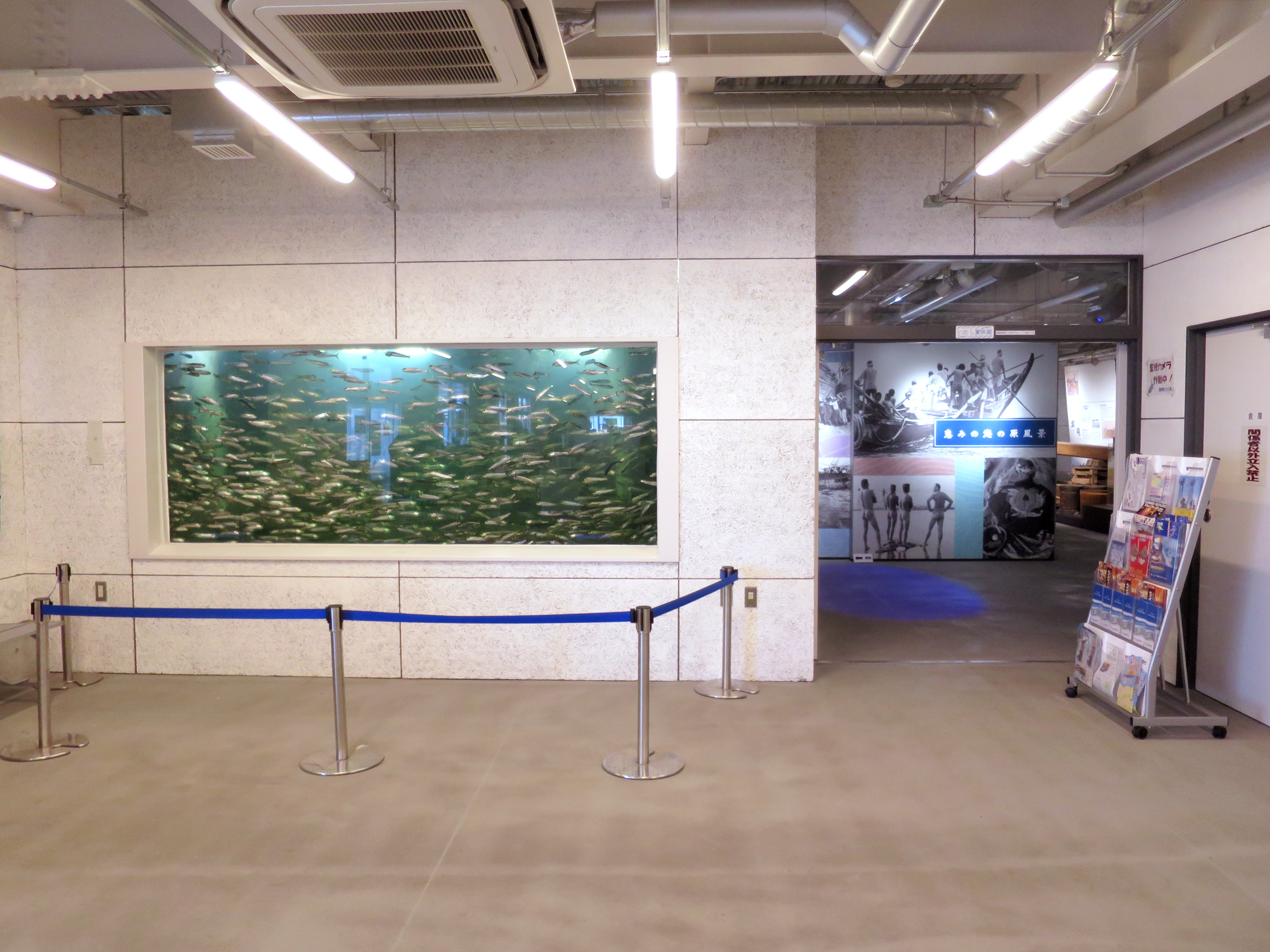
Kujūkuri Sardine Museum

Kujūkuri (九十九里町, Kujūkuri-machi) is a town located in Chiba Prefecture, Japan. As of 1 December 2020, the town had an estimated population of 15,343 in 7,092 households and a population density of 650 persons per km². The total area of the city is 23.72 square kilometres (9.16 sq mi). Kujūkuri owes its name to its beach, Kujūkuri Beach, which is Japan's second longest. The word "Kujūkuri" roughly translates to mean "ninety-nine ri", with "kujūku" meaning "ninety-nine" and "ri" being an old unit of measurement equating to approximately 600 meters.

== Geography ==
Kujūkuri is located on the east-central Bōsō Peninsula, on the shore of the Pacific Ocean. It is about 30 kilometers from the prefectural capital at Chiba and 60 to 70 kilometers from central Tokyo.

=== Surrounding municipalities ===
Chiba Prefecture

- Ōamishirasato
- Sanmu
- Tōgane

=== Climate ===
Kujūkuri has a humid subtropical climate (Köppen Cfa) characterized by warm summers and cool winters with light to no snowfall. The average annual temperature in Kujūkuri is 15.2 °C. The average annual rainfall is 1609 mm with September as the wettest month. The temperatures are highest on average in August, at around 26.0 °C, and lowest in January, at around 5.4 °C.

== Demographics ==
Per Japanese census data, the population of Kujūkuri has declined in recent decades.

Historical population
Year	Pop.	±%
1950	21,672	—
1960	19,191	−11.4%
1970	17,639	−8.1%
1980	18,037	+2.3%
1990	19,300	+7.0%
2000	20,266	+5.0%
2010	18,004	−11.2%
2020	14,639	−18.7%

== History ==
During the Edo period, the area was noted for its product of sweet potatoes. In the Meiji period, the villages of Katakai and Toyoumi were established within Sanbu District, Chiba with the creation of the modern municipalities system. on April 1, 1889. Katakai was raised to town status on April 10, 1926 and Toyoumi on February 11, 1940. The two towns merged with a portion of the village of Naruhama on March 31, 1955 to form the town of Kujūkuri.

== Government ==
Kujūkuri has a mayor-council form of government with a directly elected mayor and a unicameral town council of 14 members. Kujūkuri, collectively with the city of Sanmu and the other municipalities of Sanmu District, contributes two members to the Chiba Prefectural Assembly. In terms of national politics, the town is part of Chiba 11th district of the lower house of the Diet of Japan.

== Economy ==
Commercial fishing and food processing (particularly sardine processing) remain the primary industries of Kujūkuri, although the town is primarily known as a beach resort, from its seaside location and mild climate, and attracts more than million tourists each year. Kujūkuri and surrounding towns are also popular surfing destinations. Efforts are underway to raise its profile including the establishment of the Tōgane Kujūkuri Toll Road to improve the town's accessibility and the opening of the Kujūkuri Sardine Museum as a point of cultural interest.

== Education ==
Kujūkuri has three public elementary schools and two public middle schools operated by the town government, and one public high school operated by the Chiba Prefectural Board of Education.

== Transportation ==
Despite its popularity as a beach resort, Kujūkuri is not served by either railway or highway connections.

== Local attractions ==
- Kujūkuri Beach
- Kujūkuri Sardine Museum

== Sister cities ==
- (Japan) Kamiichi, Toyama, since July 1965

== Noted people from Kujūkuri ==
- Inō Tadataka, Edo period mapmaker

== Gallery ==
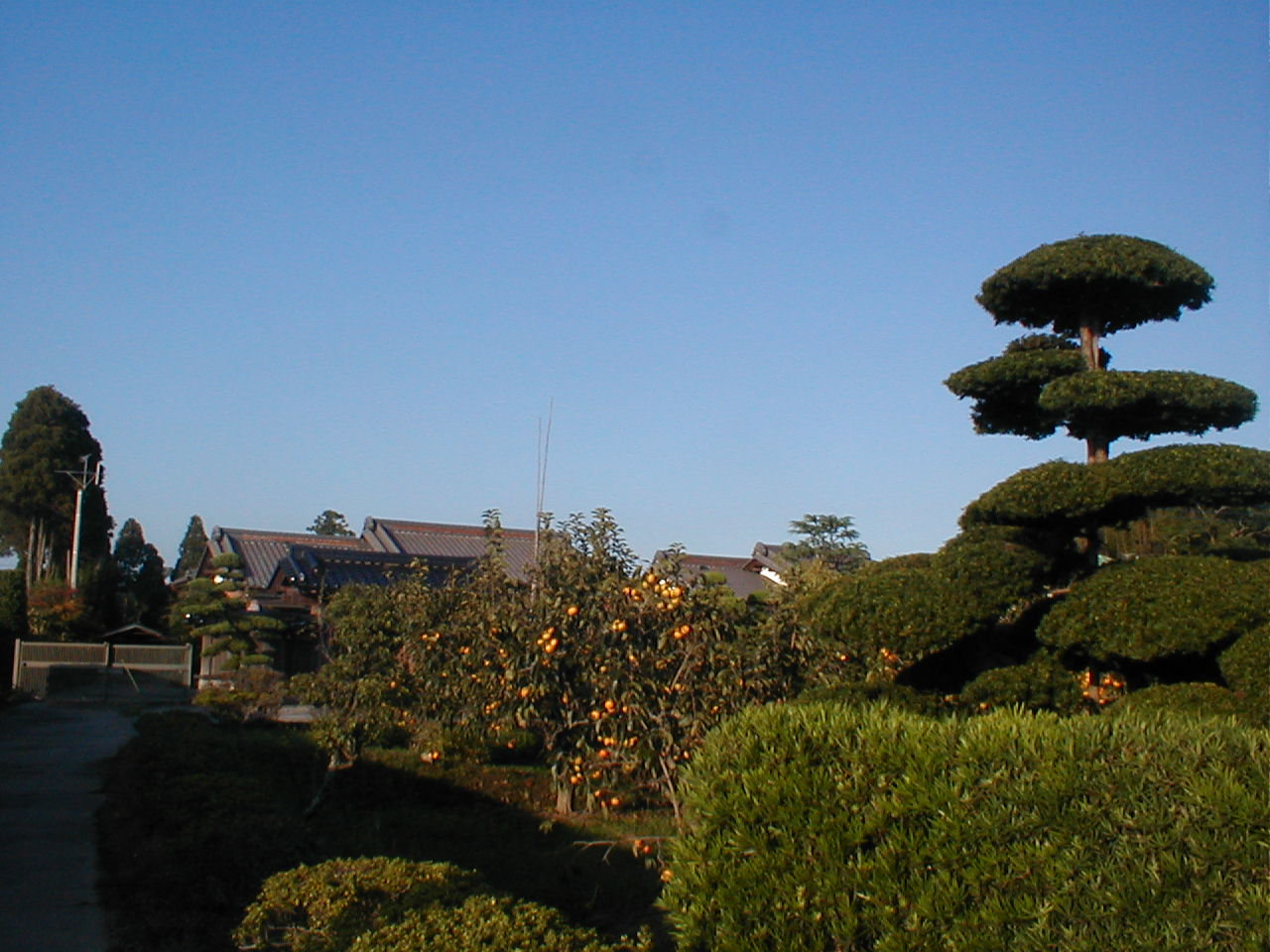
A typical Kujūkuri residential scene.

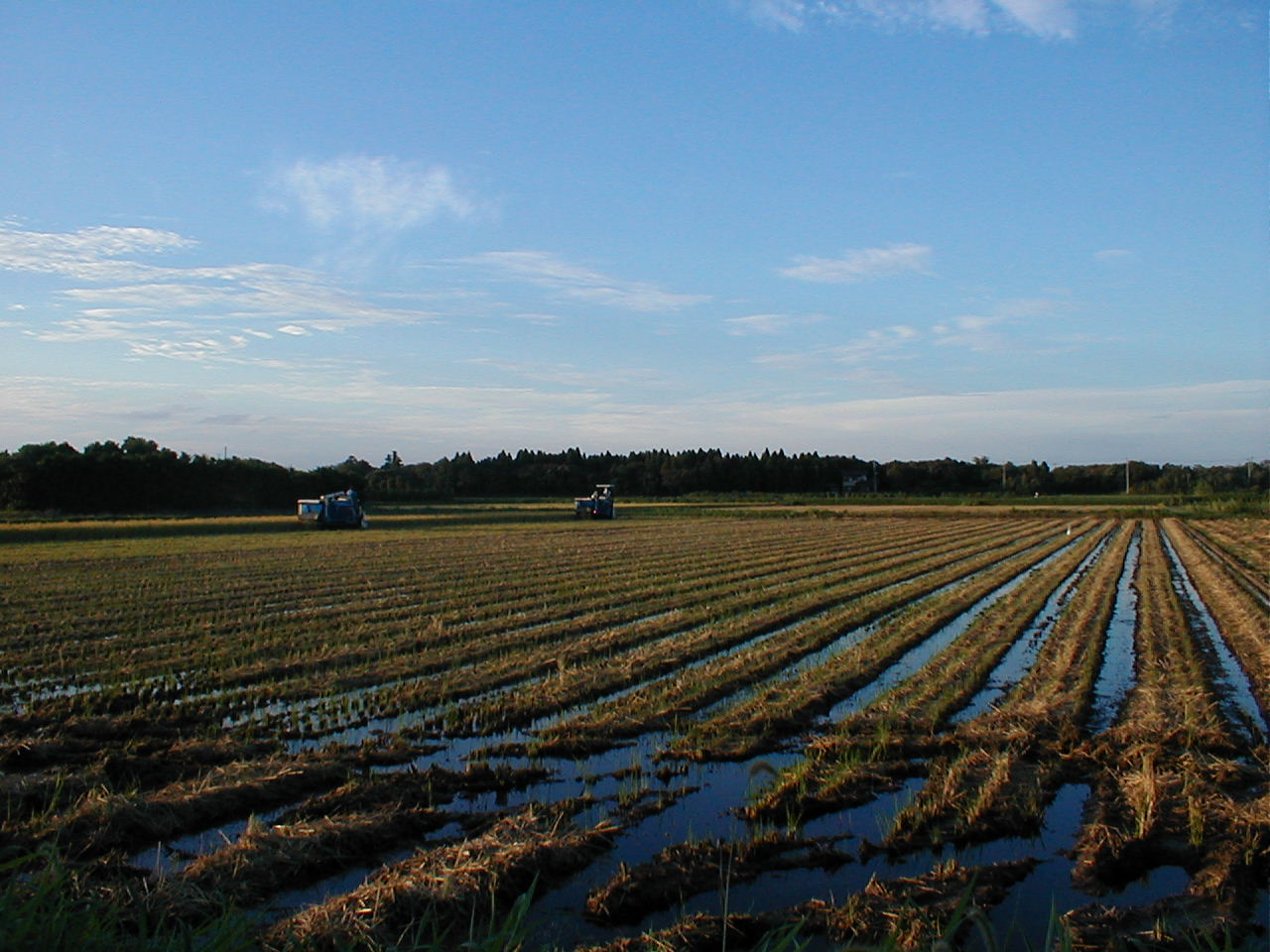
An agricultural scene from the Kujūkuri area.

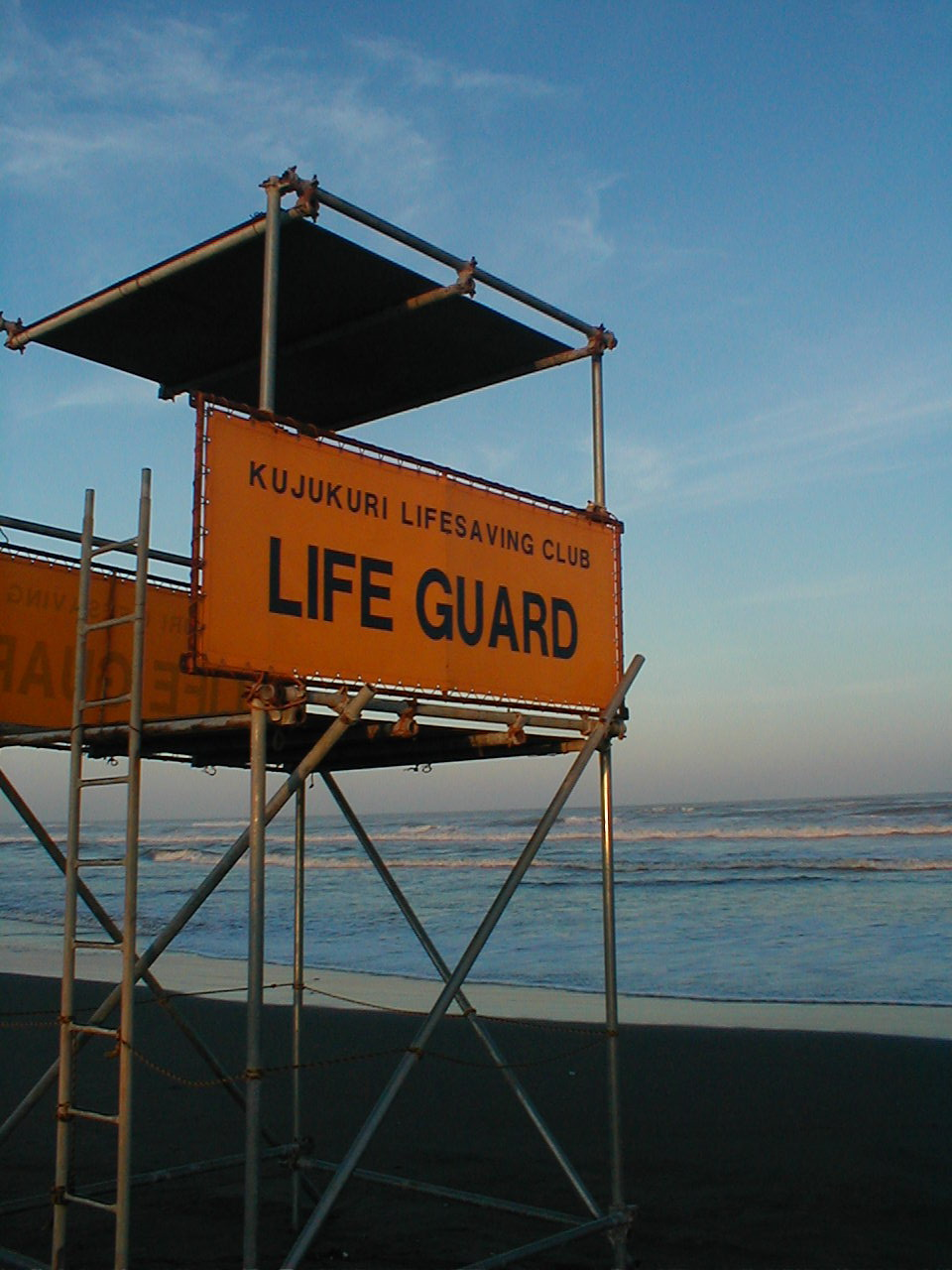
Kujūkuri Beach.
