= Ichinomiya River =

Coordinates: 35°23′35″N 140°23′30″E

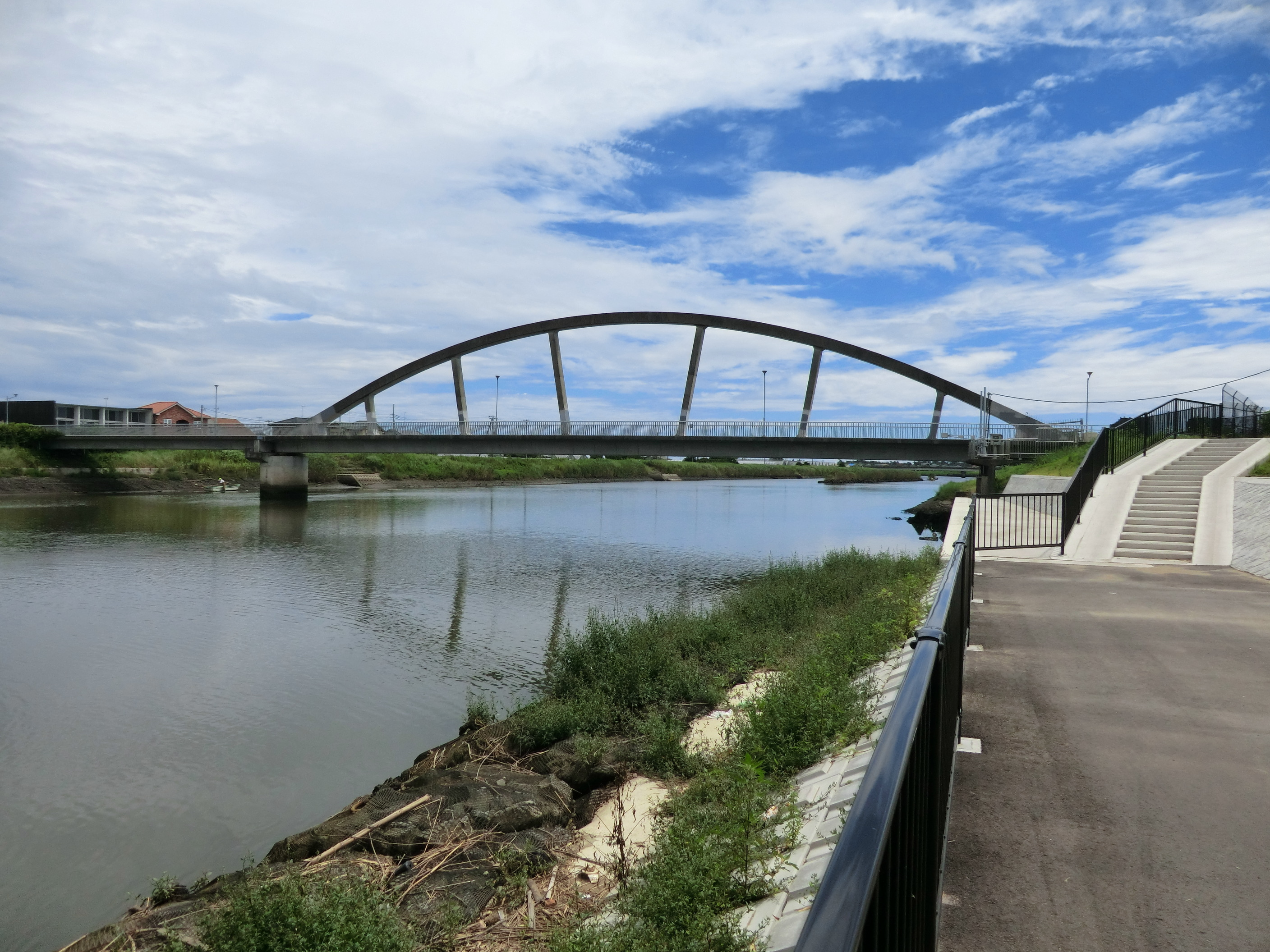

- Native name: 一宮川 (Japanese)

Location
- Country: Japan

Physical characteristics
- Source
  - location: Fukusawa District, Chōnan, Chiba Prefecture
- Mouth
  - location: Pacific Ocean
  - elevation: 0 m (0 ft)
- Length: 37.3 km (23.2 mi)
- Basin size: 222 km^{2} (86 sq mi)

The Ichinomiya River (一宮川, Ichinomiyagawa) is a river in Chiba Prefecture, Japan. It is 37.3 kilometers (23.2 mi) in length and has a drainage area of 222 square kilometers (86 sq mi). Under the Rivers Act of 1906 the Ichinomiya is designated as a Class 2 River. The river basin of the Ichinomiya was a social, cultural, and economic center of Kazusa Province in pre-modern Japan. Although very shallow, the river was used to transport sardines from Kujukuri Beach to Tokyo Bay until the beginning of the Meiji period.

== Geography ==
The source of the Ichinomiya River is in the Fukusawa District of Chōnan, and crosses the southern part of the Kujukuri Plain through Ōtaki, Nagara, Mobara, and Mutsuzawa, and the town of Ichinomiya. It pours into the Pacific Ocean in the Ichimatsu District of the village of Chōsei.

=== Tributaries ===
- Mizusawa River
- Habu River
- Chōrakuji River
- Obuta River
- Satsubo River
- Tsurue River
- Aku River
- Toyoda River
- Sanzu River
- Mizugami River

== Sources ==
- "Ichinomiya-gawa". Nihon Rekishi Chimei Taikei (日本歴史地名大系 “Compendium of Japanese Historical Place Names”). Tokyo: Netto Adobansusha. 2011. Archived from the original on 2007-08-25.
