= List of cities in Chiba Prefecture by population =

The following list sorts all municipalities (cities, towns and villages) in the Japanese prefecture of Chiba with a population of more than 10,000 according to the 2020 Census. As of October 1, 2020, 46 places fulfill this criterion and are listed here. This list refers only to the population of individual cities, towns and villages within their defined limits, which does not include other municipalities or suburban areas within urban agglomerations.

Population figures are retroactively calculated to correspond to the current, 2010 municipalities and municipal borders (see the List of mergers in Chiba Prefecture for changes).

== List ==
The following table lists the 46 cities, towns and villages in Chiba with a population of at least 10,000 on October 1, 2020, according to the 2020 Census. The table also gives an overview of the evolution of the population since the 1995 census.

Rank (2020)	Name	Status	2020	2015	2010	2005	2000	1995
1	Chiba	City	975,210	971,882	961,749	924,319	887,164	856,878
2	Funabashi	City	642,972	622,890	609,040	569,835	550,074	540,817
3	Matsudo	City	498,293	483,480	484,457	472,579	464,841	461,503
4	Ichikawa	City	496,943	481,732	473,919	466,608	448,642	440,555
5	Kashiwa	City	426,552	413,954	404,012	380,963	373,778	362,880
6	Ichihara	City	269,653	274,656	280,416	280,255	278,218	277,061
7	Nagareyama	City	199,960	174,373	163,984	152,641	150,527	146,245
8	Yachiyo	City	199,597	193,152	189,781	180,729	168,848	154,509
9	Narashino	City	176,306	167,909	164,530	158,785	154,036	152,887
10	Urayasu	City	171,424	164,024	164,877	155,290	132,984	123,654
11	Sakura	City	168,858	172,739	172,183	171,246	170,934	162,624
12	Noda	City	152,674	153,583	155,491	151,240	151,197	152,245
13	Kisarazu	City	136,224	134,141	129,312	122,234	122,768	123,499
14	Narita	City	132,998	131,190	128,933	121,139	116,898	112,662
15	Abiko	City	130,590	131,606	134,017	131,205	127,733	124,257
16	Kamagaya	City	109,989	108,917	107,853	102,812	102,573	99,694
17	Inzai	City	102,651	92,670	88,176	81,102	79,780	72,278
18	Yotsukaidō	City	93,632	89,245	86,726	84,770	82,552	79,495
19	Mobara	City	86,821	89,688	93,015	93,260	93,779	91,664
20	Kimitsu	City	82,249	86,033	89,168	90,977	92,076	93,216
21	Katori	City	72,427	77,499	82,866	87,332	90,943	93,544
22	Yachimata	City	67,480	70,734	73,212	75,735	72,595	65,218
23	Sodegaura	City	63,906	60,952	60,355	59,108	58,593	57,575
24	Asahi	City	63,788	66,586	69,058	70,643	71,176	71,382
25	Shiroi	City	62,470	61,674	60,345	53,005	50,431	47,450
26	Chōshi	City	58,478	64,415	70,210	75,020	78,697	82,180
27	Tōgane	City	58,248	60,652	61,751	61,701	59,605	54,520
28	Tomisato	City	49,762	49,636	51,087	51,370	50,176	48,666
29	Sanmu	City	48,462	52,222	56,089	59,024	60,614	58,405
30	Ōamishirasato	City	48,155	49,184	50,113	49,548	47,036	42,363
31	Tateyama	City	45,177	47,464	49,290	50,527	51,412	52,880
32	Futtsu	City	42,508	45,601	48,073	50,162	52,839	54,273
33	Minamibōsō	City	35,844	39,033	42,104	44,763	47,154	48,945
34	Isumi	City	35,571	38,594	40,962	42,305	42,835	43,547
35	Sōsa	City	35,099	37,261	39,814	42,086	42,914	43,357
36	Kamogawa	City	32,149	33,932	35,766	36,475	37,653	39,283
37	Yokoshibahikari	Town	22,091	23,762	24,675	25,981	26,721	26,814
38	Shisui	Town	20,760	20,955	21,234	21,385	19,885	20,019
39	Sakae	Town	20,140	21,228	22,580	24,377	25,475	25,615
40	Katsuura	City	16,938	19,248	20,788	22,198	23,235	24,328
41	Kujūkuri	Town	14,644	16,510	18,004	19,009	20,266	20,196
42	Chōsei	Village	13,808	14,359	14,752	14,543	13,892	13,133
43	Tako	Town	13,748	14,724	16,002	16,950	17,603	18,201
44	Tōnoshō	Town	13,235	14,152	15,154	16,166	17,076	17,739
45	Ichinomiya	Town	11,900	11,767	12,034	11,656	11,648	11,302
46	Shirako	Town	10,311	11,149	12,151	12,850	13,103	13,238
