= Mutsuzawa =

Mutsuzawa 睦沢町
- Town
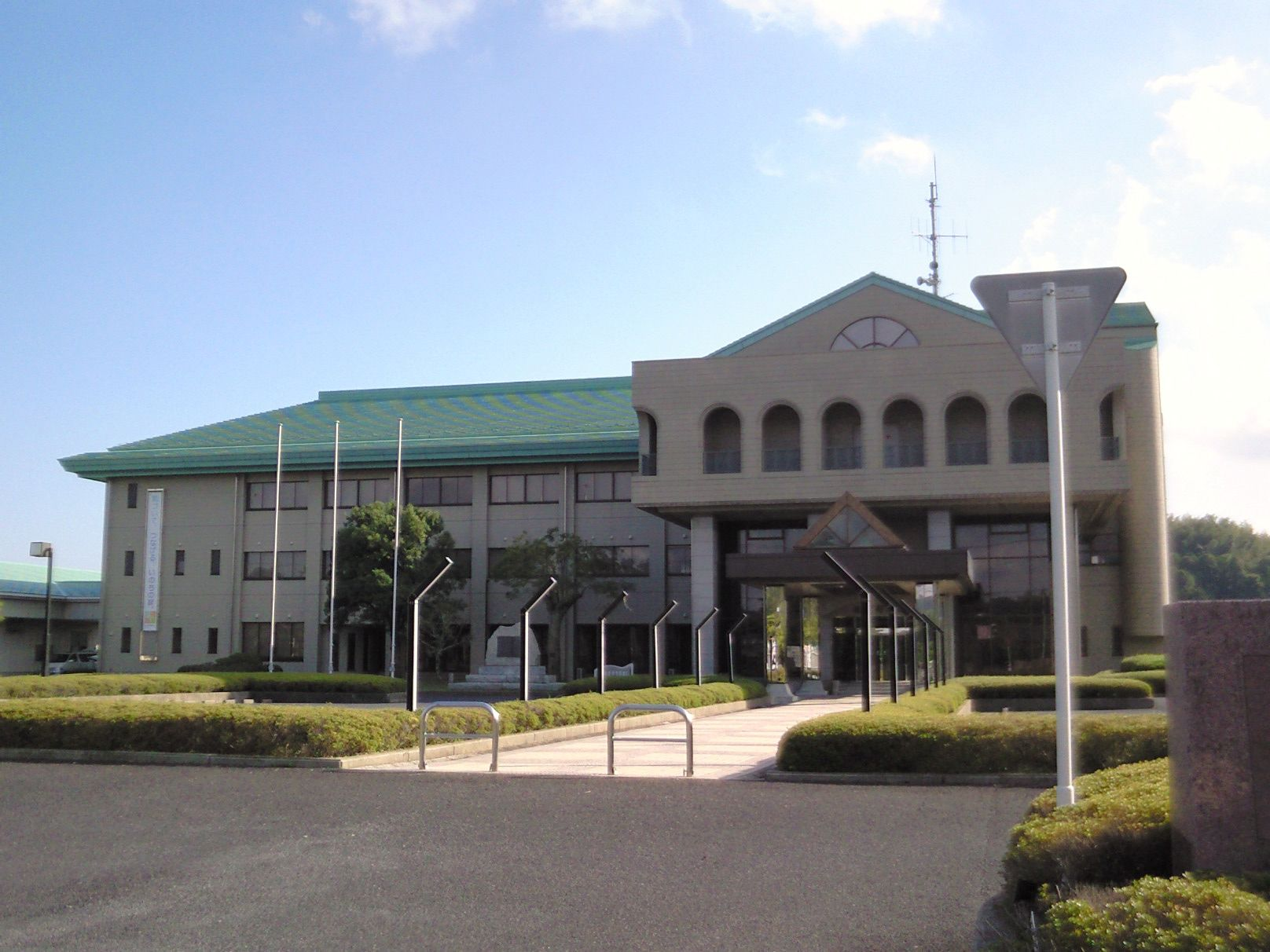
- Mutsuzawa Town Hall

- Flag Seal

- Location of Mutsuzawa in Chiba Prefecture

- Coordinates: 35°22′N 140°19′E
- Country: Japan
- Region: Kantō
- Prefecture: Chiba
- District: Chōsei

Area
  - Total: 35.59 km^{2} (13.74 sq mi)

Population (November 30, 2020)
  - Total: 6,928
  - Density: 194.7/km^{2} (504.2/sq mi)
- Time zone: UTC+9 (Japan Standard Time)
- Tree: Plum tree
- Flower: Satsuki azalea
- Phone number: 0475-44-1111
- Address: 1650 Shimonogō, Mutsuzawa-machi, Chōsei-gun, Chiba-ken; 299-4414
- Website: Official website

Mutsuzawa (睦沢町, Mutsuzawa-machi) is a town located in Chiba Prefecture, Japan. As of 1 December 2020, the town had an estimated population of 6,928 in 2796 households and a population density of 190 persons per km^{2}. The total area of the town is 35.59 square kilometres (13.74 mi^{2}).

== Geography ==
Located in the mountainous area that divides the center of Bōsō Peninsula, Mutsuzawa has little flat terrain. The town consists primarily of rolling, sometimes steep, hills. The town is located in the southeastern part of Chiba prefecture, about 30 kilometers from the prefectural capital at Chiba, and within 60 to 70 kilometers from the center of Tokyo. The terrain is included in the Kanto Plain, with a gentle slope from the west toward the east with an elevation of 2 to 168 meters. The Habu, Mizusawa, and Chorakuji rivers flow through the central part of the town, and join the Ichinomiya river in the northeast.

=== Neighboring municipalities ===
Chiba Prefecture

- Chōnan
- Chōsei
- Ichinomiya
- Isumi
- Mobara
- Ōtaki

=== Climate ===
Mutsuzawa has a humid subtropical climate (Köppen Cfa) characterized by warm summers and cool winters with light to no snowfall. The average annual temperature in Mutsuzawa is 15.3 °C. The average annual rainfall is 1745 mm with September as the wettest month. The temperatures are highest on average in August, at around 25.9 °C, and lowest in January, at around 5.7 °C.

== Demographics ==
Per Japanese census data, the population of Mutsuzawa has remained relatively steady over the past 50 years.

Historical population
Year	Pop.	±%
1950	9,362	—
1960	8,152	−12.9%
1970	6,259	−23.2%
1980	7,068	+12.9%
1990	7,956	+12.6%
2000	8,244	+3.6%
2010	7,340	−11.0%
2020	6,760	−7.9%

== History ==
Mutsuzawa is part of ancient Kazusa Province and has been settled since ancient times, and has several burial mounds from the Kofun period. Myōraku-ji, a temple founded in the Heian period, houses a wooden statue of the seated Dainichi Nyorai which has been designated one of the Important Cultural Properties of Japan. In the Edo period, Mutsuzawa was part of Ōtaki Domain. The villages of Tsuchimutsu, and Mizusawa were established with the creation of the modern municipalities system on April 1, 1889. The two villages merged on February 11, 1955, with a portion of the town of Chōnan to form the village of Mutsuzawa. It was elevated to town status on April 1, 1983.

== Government ==
Mutsuzawa has a mayor-council form of government with a directly elected mayor and a unicameral town council of 15 members. Together with the other municipalities in Chōsei District, Mutsuzawa contributes one member to the Chiba Prefectural Assembly. In terms of national politics, the town is part of Chiba 11th district of the lower house of the Diet of Japan.

== Economy ==
Mutsuzawa's agricultural areas produce rice and milk. The town is also located within the Minami Kantō gas field, and extraction of natural gas contributes to the local economy.

== Education ==
Mutsuzawa has one public elementary school and one public middle school operated by the town government. The town does not have a public high school.

== Transportation ==
=== Railway ===
Mutsuzawa does not have any passenger rail service.

=== Highway ===
The town is not on any national highway.

- Chiba Prefectural Road 148
- Chiba Prefectural Road 150
- Chiba Prefectural Road 151
