= Chōsei =

Chōsei 長生村
- Village
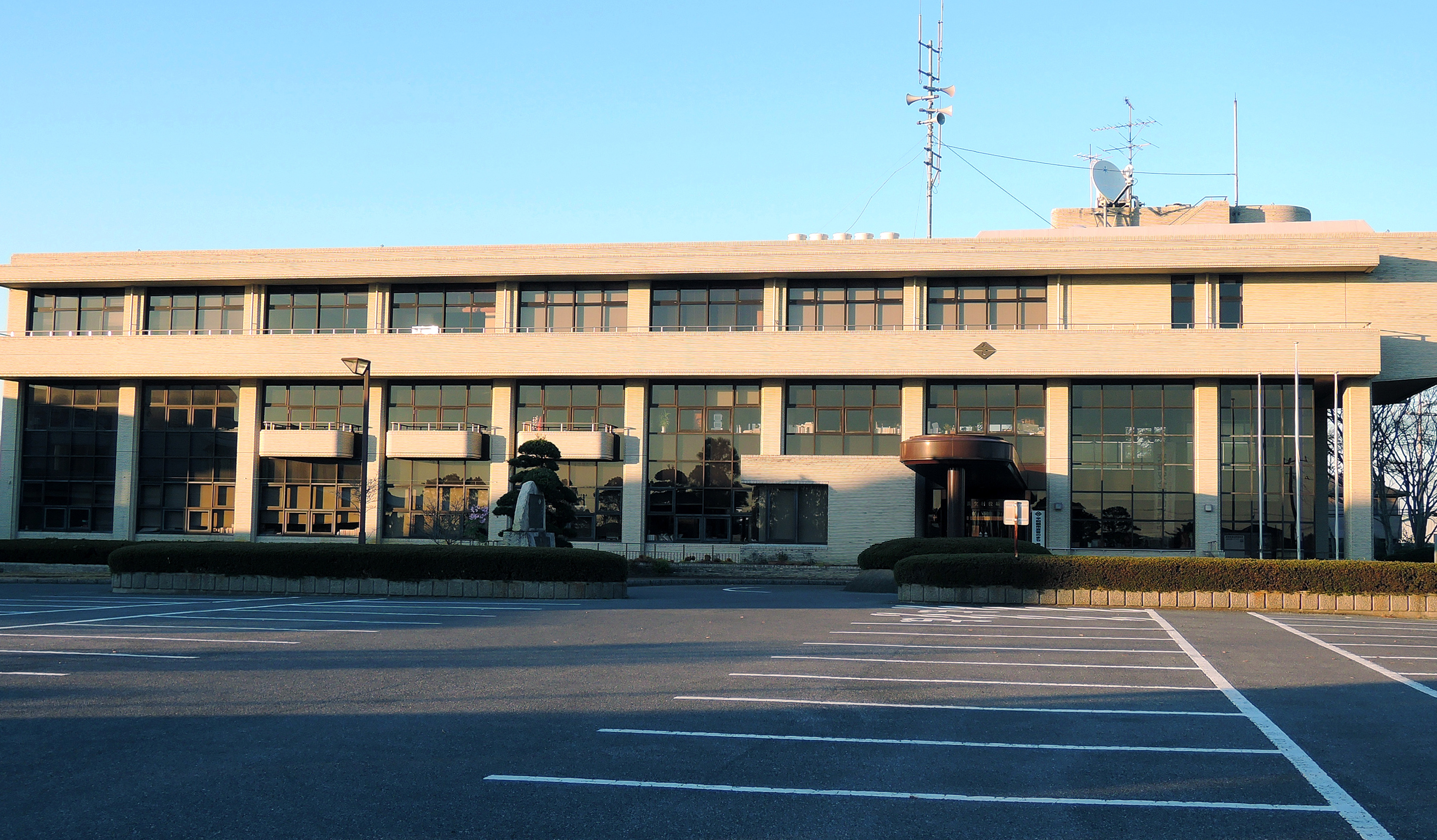
- Chōsei Village hall

- Flag Seal

- Location of Chōsei in Chiba Prefecture

- Coordinates: 35°25′N 140°21′E
- Country: Japan
- Region: Kantō
- Prefecture: Chiba
- District: Chōsei

Area
  - Total: 28.32 km^{2} (10.93 sq mi)

Population (December 1, 2020)
  - Total: 14,028
  - Density: 495.3/km^{2} (1,283/sq mi)
- Time zone: UTC+9 (Japan Standard Time)
- Tree: Podocarpaceae
- Flower: Calystegia soldanella
- Phone number: 0475-32-2111
- Address: 1-77 Hongo, Chōsei-mura, Chōsei-gun, Chiba-ken 299-4394
- Website: Official website

Chōsei (長生村, Chōsei-mura) is a village located in Chiba Prefecture, Japan. As of 31 December 2020, the village had an estimated population of 14,028 in 6096 households and a population density of 500 persons per km^{2}. The total area of the village is 28.32 square kilometres (10.93 mi^{2}). It is the only remaining municipality classed as a village in Chiba Prefecture.

== Geography ==
Chōsei is located in the eastern part of Chiba prefecture, about 30 kilometers from the prefectural capital at Chiba and within 60 to 70 kilometers from the center of Tokyo. The village faces the Pacific Ocean and is located in the southern part of the Kujūkuri Plain (Kujūkuri Beach). The terrain is gentle and has few undulations. The village area is dotted with ponds for agricultural water. The Ichinomiya River empties into the Pacific Ocean at Kujukuri Beach in Chōsei.

=== Neighboring municipalities ===
Chiba Prefecture

- Ichinomiya
- Mobara
- Mutsuzawa
- Shirako

=== Climate ===
Chōsei has a humid subtropical climate (Köppen Cfa) characterized by warm summers and cool winters with light to no snowfall. The average annual temperature in Chōsei is 15.3 °C. The average annual rainfall is 1683 mm with September as the wettest month. The temperatures are highest on average in August, at around 26.0 °C, and lowest in January, at around 5.7 °C.

== Demographics ==
Per Japanese census data, the population of Chōsei has recently plateaued after several decades of growth.

Historical population
Year	Pop.	±%
1950	12,147	—
1960	10,120	−16.7%
1970	9,383	−7.3%
1980	10,132	+8.0%
1990	11,155	+10.1%
2000	13,892	+24.5%
2010	14,752	+6.2%
2020	13,803	−6.4%

== History ==
Chōsei is located in former Kazusa Province. The villages of Takanehongo, Yatsumi, Ichimatsu were established with the creation of the modern municipalities' system on April 1, 1889.Chōsei Village was created on November 3, 1953, from the merger of these hamlets. Some minor territorial adjustments were made with neighboring Ichinomiya in 1954 and 1955.

== Government ==
Chōsei has a mayor-council form of government with a directly elected mayor and a unicameral village council of 15 members. Together with the other municipalities in Chōsei District, Chōsei contributes one member to the Chiba Prefectural Assembly. In terms of national politics, the village is part of Chiba 11th district of the lower house of the Diet of Japan.

== Economy ==
The primary industry of Chōsei is small-scale horticulture, and the growing of fruits, notably melons and tomatoes. The village is also located within the Minami Kanto gas field, and extraction of natural gas and production of iodine is also a major industry.

== Education ==
Chōsei has three public elementary schools and one public middle school operated by the village government. The village does not have a high school.

== Transportation ==
=== Railway ===
JR East – Sotobō Line

- Yatsumi

=== Highway ===
- Kujukuri Toll Road
- National Route 128
