= Tamasaki Shrine =

Shinto shrine in Chiba Prefecture, Japan

Coordinates: 35°22′33.75″N 140°21′37.75″E

Tamasaki Jinja 玉前神社
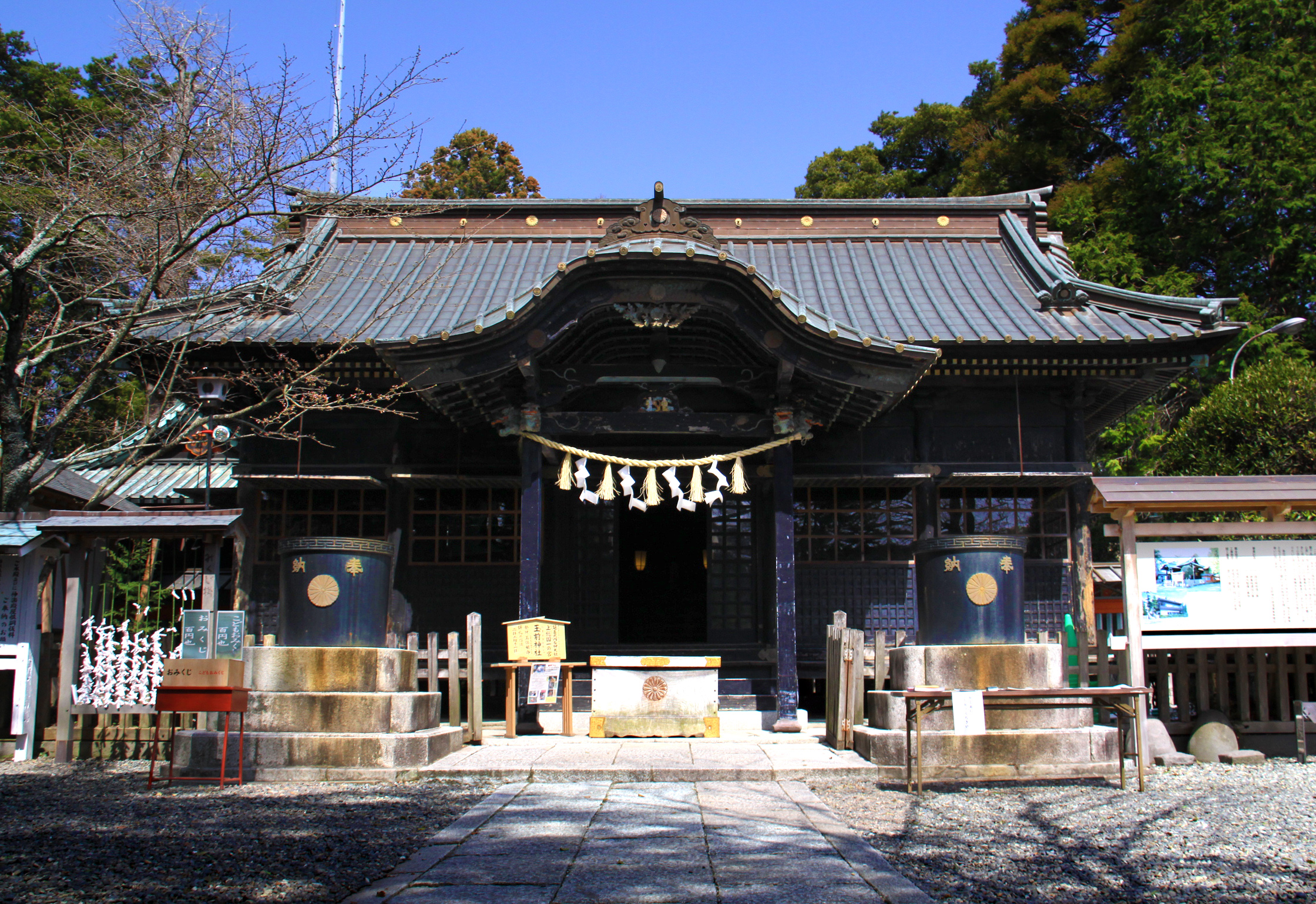
- Haiden of Tamasaki Shrine

- Location within Chiba Prefecture Location within Japan

Religion
- Affiliation: Shinto
- Deity: Tamayori-hime no mikoto
- Festival: September 13

Location
- Location: 3048 Ichinomiya, Ichinomiya-machi, Chōsei-gun, Chiba-ken 299-4301
- Interactive map of Tamasaki Jinja 玉前神社

Architecture
- Established: unknown

Website
- Official website

Tamasaki Jinja (玉前神社) is a Shinto shrine in the Ichinomiya neighborhood of the town of Ichinomiya in Chōsei District, Chiba Prefecture, Japan. It is the ichinomiya of former Kazusa Province. The main festival of the shrine is held annually on September 13, and features kagura performances, which are listed as an Intangible Cultural Property of Chiba Prefecture.

== Enshrined kami ==
- Tamayori-hime (玉依姫命), the mother of Emperor Jimmu and daughter of the sea-dragon god Watatsumi

== History ==
The origins of Tamasaki Jinja are unknown. The shrine is located in an area of the Bōsō Peninsula with a favorable climate, which has been settled since at least the Jōmon period. Shell middens and burial mounds are common in the area. Its earliest appearance unhistorical documentation is an entry date 868 in the Ruijū Kokushi followed by the Nihon Sandai Jitsuroku in 877. The shrine is mentioned as the ichinomiya of Kazusa Province in the Engishiki records from the early Heian period. However, repeated fires and other disasters over the centuries have destroyed all of the old shrine records and buildings. The shrine was burned down in 1562 during a battle involving the Satomi clan and was rebuilt by the Satomi in 1587. Additional structures were donated by Tokugawa Ieyasu in 1591 and the shrine reconstructed in 1687. During the Meiji period, the shrine was designated as an Imperial shrine, 2nd rank (国幣中社, kokuhei-chūsha) under the Modern system of ranked Shinto Shrines.

The shrine is located a seven-minute walk from Kazusa-Ichinomiya Station on the JR East Sotobō Line.

== Gallery ==
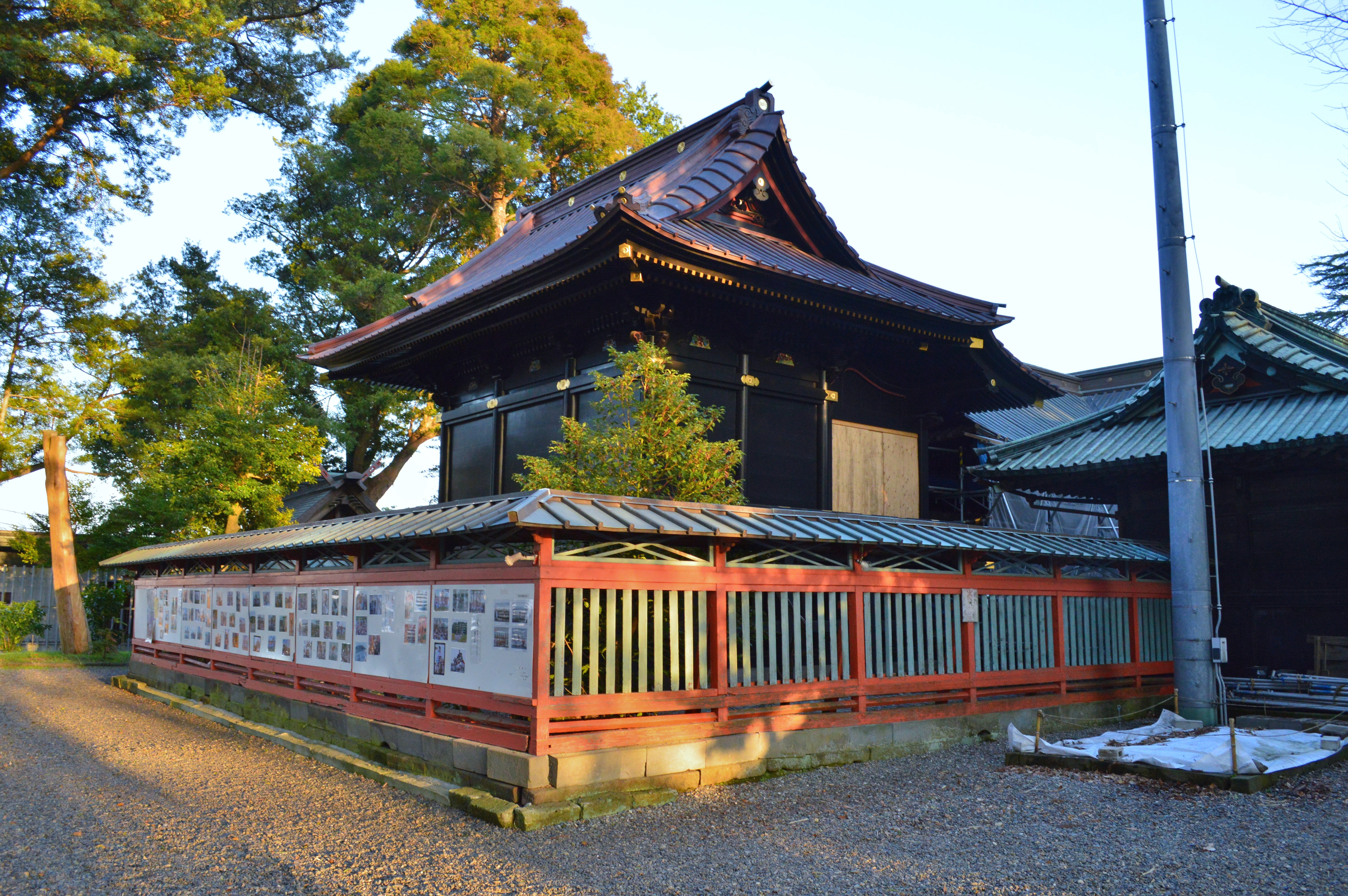
Honden

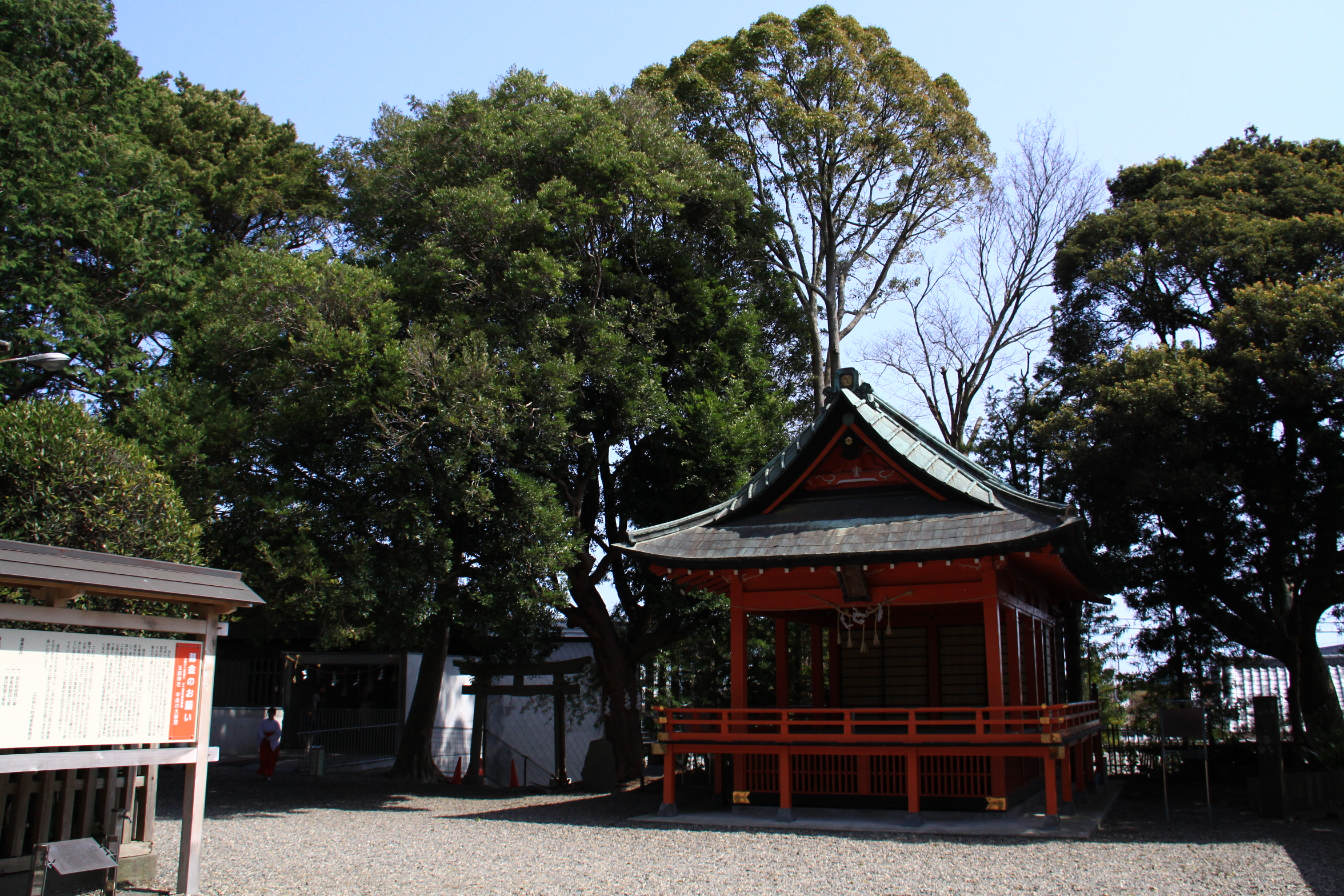
Precincts

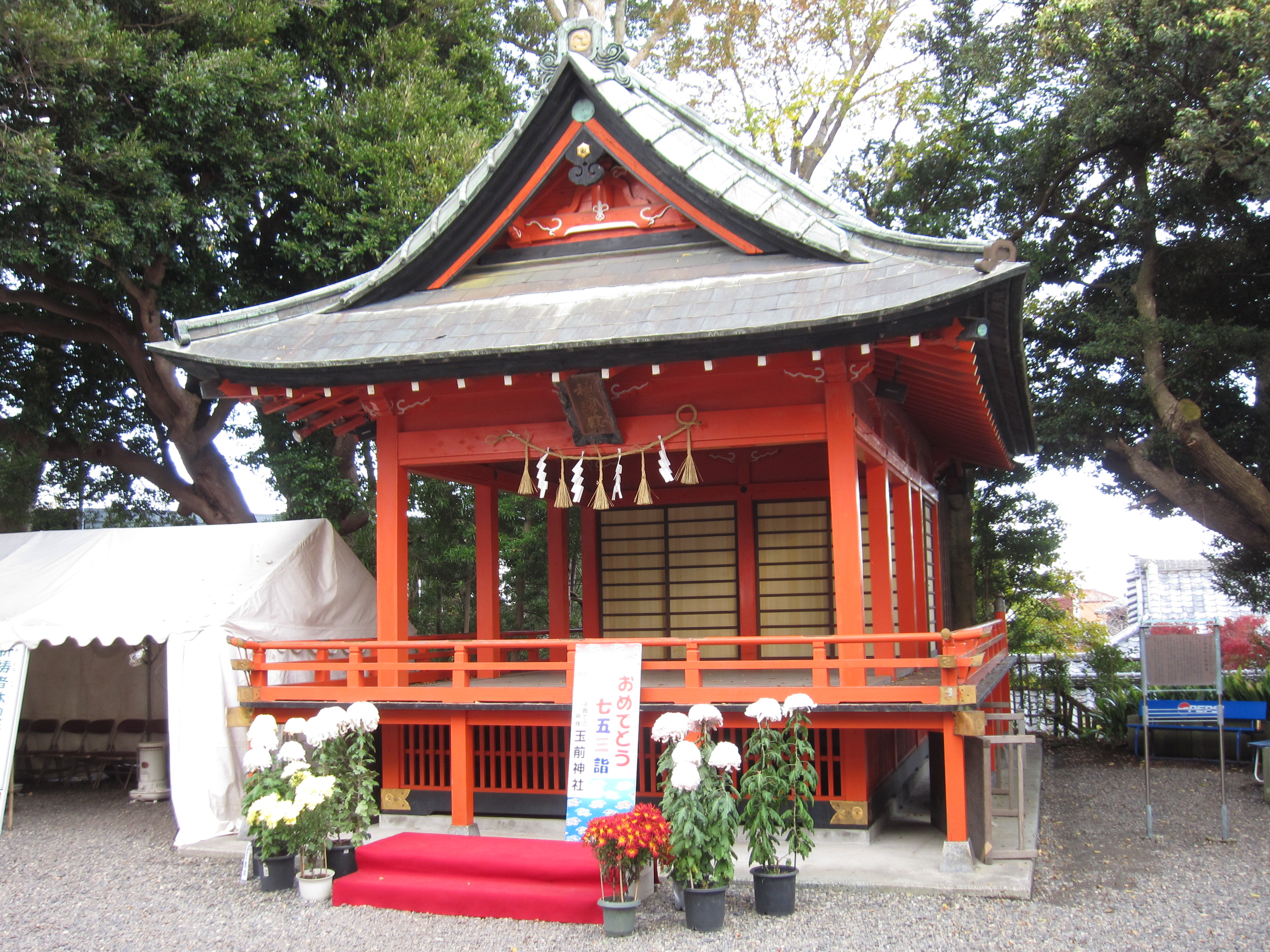
Kagura-den

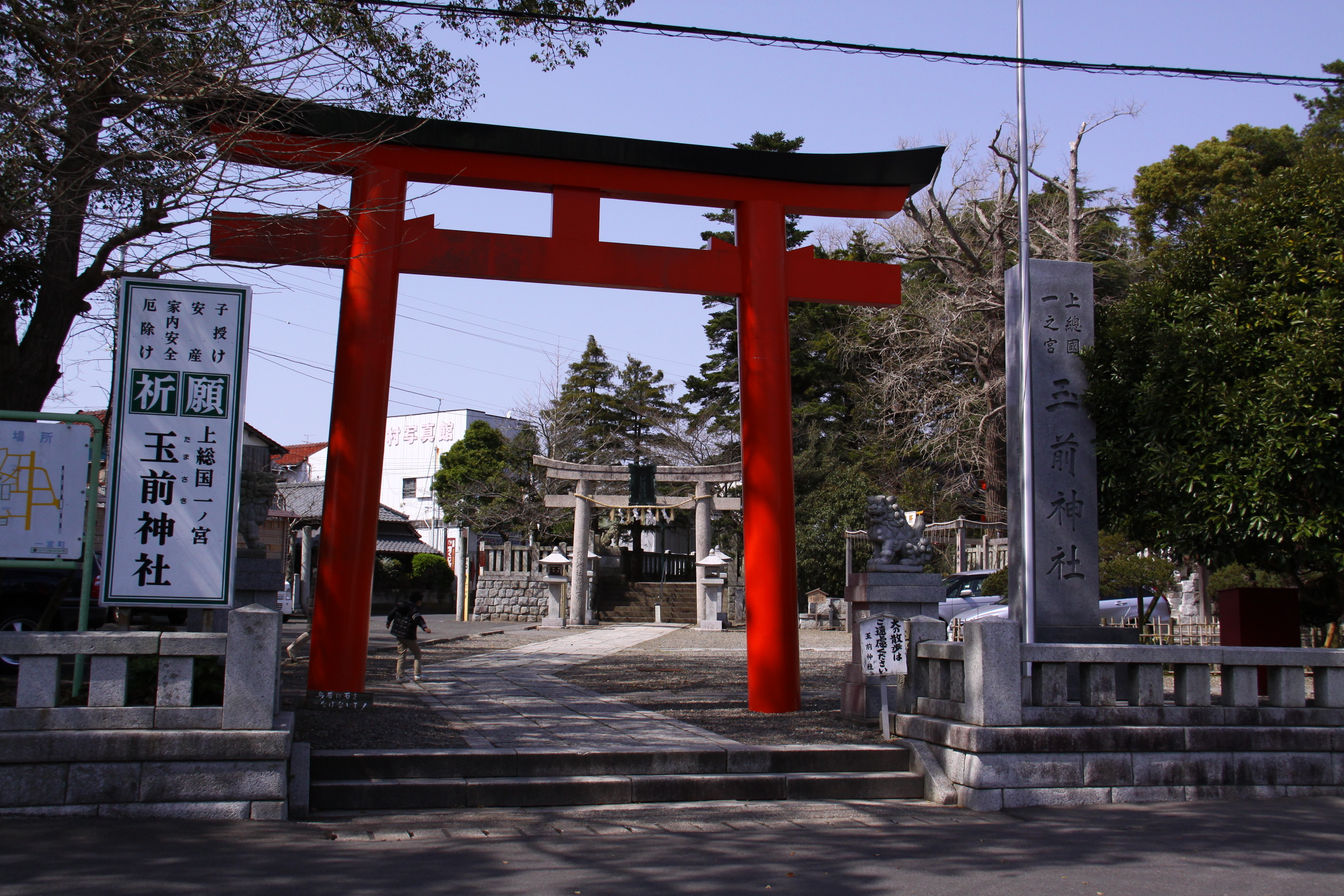
Ichi-no-torii

== Cultural Properties ==
=== National Important Cultural Properties ===
- Bronze mirror (梅樹双雀鏡, Baijusōjakukyō), Kamakura period, designated National Important Cultural Property in 1953. The mirror has a diameter of 20.5 cm and a thickness of 3.5 cm, and is made of cupronickel (an alloy of copper and tin). The two small holes on the edge are presumed to indicate that this mirror was once hung in front of the shrine as a shintai. On the reverse side is a design of running water with an old plum tree on the right and pampas grass to the left, with two sparrows plating on the trunk, which is bending left. This is an idealized spring scene typical of the Kamakura period.

=== Chiba Prefecture Designated Tangible Cultural Properties ===
- Tamasaki Jinja Shaden (玉前神社社殿と棟札), Edo period (1687); The current shrine building is painted black lacquer and is a gongen-zukuri style structure with the main hall and worship hall connected by a heiden (offering hall). Regarding its construction, a ridgepole dated March 1687 indicates that the main hall was completed, followed by a ridgepole dated August 1687, indicating that the worship hall and offering hall were completed.

== See also ==
- List of Shinto shrines
- Ichinomiya
