= Chonan =

Chonan may refer to:

- Chōnan, Chiba, a town in Japan
- Cheonan, a city in South Korea
  - Battle of Chonan, a battle in the city during the Korean War
- ROKS Cheonan (PCC-772), a South Korean corvette sunk in 2010
- Chonan Gang, the Korean stage name of Tsuyoshi Kusanagi, Japanese actor/singer
- Ryo Chonan (born 1976), Japanese mixed martial artist
- Chonan languages, Patagonia
