= Shirako =

Shirako 白子町
- Town
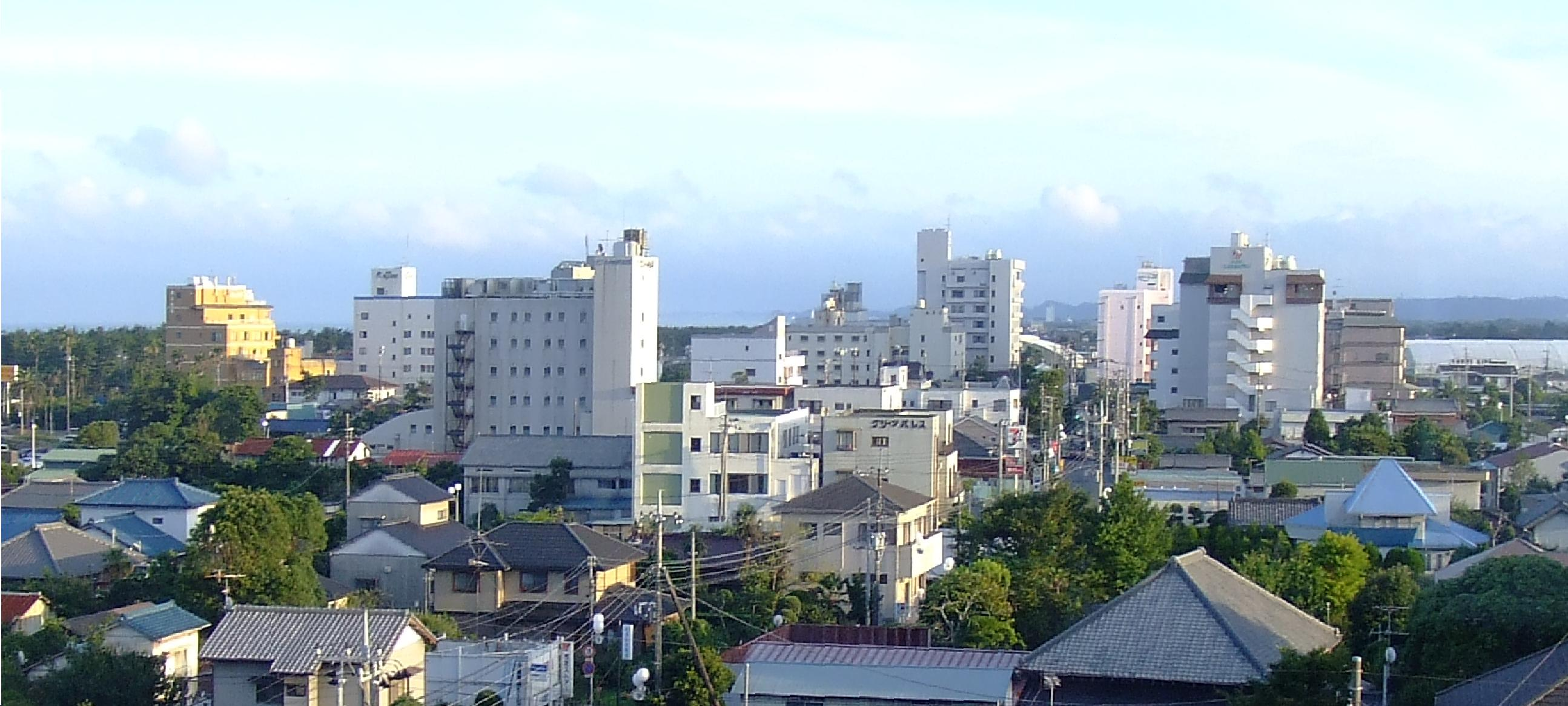
- Shirako skyline

- Flag Seal

- Location of Shirako in Chiba Prefecture

- Coordinates: 35°27′N 140°22′E
- Country: Japan
- Region: Kantō
- Prefecture: Chiba
- District: Chōsei

Area
  - Total: 27.46 km^{2} (10.60 sq mi)

Population (December 31, 2020)
  - Total: 11,040
  - Density: 402.0/km^{2} (1,041/sq mi)
- Time zone: UTC+9 (Japan Standard Time)
- Tree: Japanese black pine
- Flower: Sunflower
- Phone number: 0475-33-2111
- Address: 5074-2 Seki, Shirako-machi, Chōsei -gun, Chiba-ken 299-4292
- Website: Official website

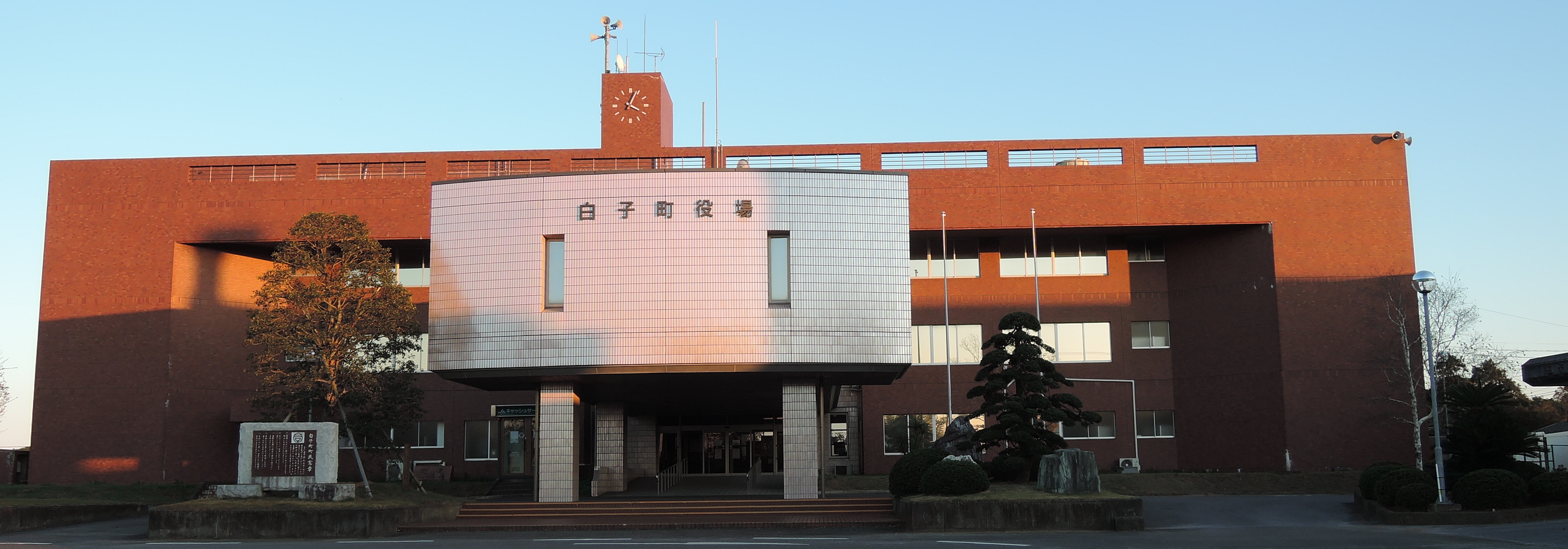
Shirako town hall

Shirako (白子町, Shirako-machi) is a town located in Chiba Prefecture, Japan. As of 1 December 2020, the town had an estimated population of 11,040 in 4942 households and a population density of 400 persons per km^{2}. The total area of the town is 27.46 square kilometres (10.60 mi^{2}).

== Geography ==
Shirako is located in eastern Chiba Prefecture, about 30 kilometers from the prefectural capital at Chiba and within 60 to 70 kilometers from the center of Tokyo. Facing the Pacific Ocean, it is included in the Kujūkuri Plain and has a gentle terrain. It has a portion the Kujūkuri Beach, and the Nabaki River runs through the center of the town.

=== Neighboring municipalities ===
Chiba Prefecture

- Chōsei
- Mobara
- Ōamishirasato

=== Climate ===
Shirako has a humid subtropical climate (Köppen Cfa) characterized by warm summers and cool winters with light to no snowfall. The average annual temperature in Shirako is 15.3 °C. The average annual rainfall is 1633 mm with September as the wettest month. The temperatures are highest on average in August, at around 26.0 °C, and lowest in January, at around 5.6 °C.

== Demographics ==
Per Japanese census data, the population of Shirako has remained relatively steady over the past 100 years.

Historical population
Year	Pop.	±%
1920	10,179	—
1930	10,751	+5.6%
1940	11,326	+5.3%
1950	13,801	+21.9%
1960	12,202	−11.6%
1970	11,237	−7.9%
1980	11,691	+4.0%
1990	12,230	+4.6%
2000	13,103	+7.1%
2010	12,151	−7.3%
2020	10,305	−15.2%

== History ==
The area of present-day Shirako is part of ancient Kazusa Province had numerous fishing hamlets during the Edo period. It was incorporated into Chōsei District after the Meiji period cadastral reforms and the town of Shirakata was created on April 1, 1889, with the establishment of the modern municipalities system. It was raised to town status on February 11, 1940. On February 11, 1955, Shirakata merged with the neighboring villages of Seki and Nabaki and was proclaimed the town of Shirako. This name was adopted from a local Shinto shrine, Shirako Jinja, which claims to have been founded in the Heian period.

== Government ==
Shirako has a mayor-council form of government with a directly elected mayor and a unicameral town council of 15 members. Together with the city of Sakura, Shirako, collectively with the other municipalities of Chōsei District, contributes one member to the Chiba Prefectural Assembly. In terms of national politics, the town is part of Chiba 11th district of the lower house of the Diet of Japan.

== Economy ==
The primary industry of Shirako has traditionally been commercial fishing, however, the tourist and resort industry now dominates the local economy.

== Education ==
Shirako has three public elementary schools and one public middle school operated by the town government. The town does not have a public high school.

== Transportation ==
=== Railway ===
Shirako does not have any passenger train service.

=== Highway ===
The town is not located on any national highway.

- Kujukuri Toll Road

== Local attractions ==
- Shirako Jinja
- Shirako Onsen
