= Nagara, Chiba =

Nagara 長柄町
- Town
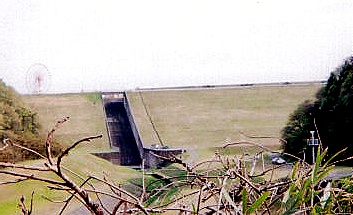
- Nagara Dam

- Flag Seal

- Location of Nagara in Chiba Prefecture

- Coordinates: 35°26′N 140°14′E
- Country: Japan
- Region: Kantō
- Prefecture: Chiba
- District: Chōsei

Area
  - Total: 47.20 km^{2} (18.22 sq mi)

Population (December 31, 2020)
  - Total: 6,754
  - Density: 143.1/km^{2} (370.6/sq mi)
- Time zone: UTC+9 (Japan Standard Time)
- Phone number: 0475-35-2111
- Address: 712 Sakuradani, Nagara-machi, Chōsei-gun, Chiba-ken; 297-0218
- Website: Official website

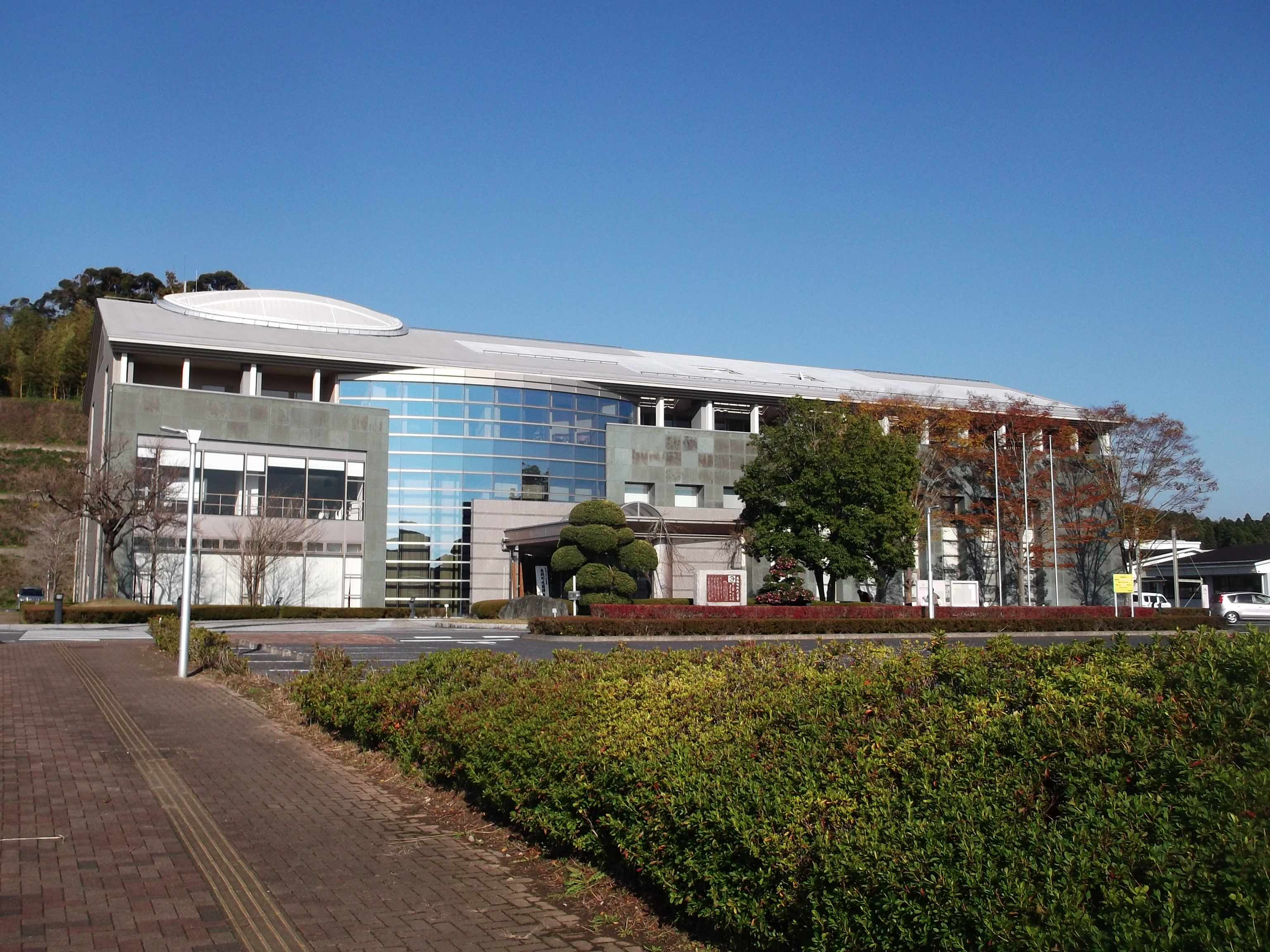
Nagara town hall

Nagara (長柄町, Nagara-machi) is a town located in Chiba Prefecture, Japan. As of 31 December 2020, the town had an estimated population of 6,754 in 2976 households and a population density of 140 persons per km^{2}. The total area of the town is 19.02 square kilometres (7.34 mi^{2}).

== Geography ==
Located in the mountainous area that divides the center of Bōsō Peninsula, Nagara has little flat terrain. The town consists primarily of rolling, sometimes steep, hills. While the town has no major rivers, several dams, including the Nagara Dam, have been constructed to support the water sources of the Bōsō Peninsula. Nagara is located about 25 kilometers from the prefectural capital at Chiba and within 50 to 60 kilometers from the center of Tokyo.

=== Neighboring municipalities ===
Chiba Prefecture

- Chōnan
- Ichihara
- Mobara

=== Climate ===
Nagara has a humid subtropical climate (Köppen Cfa) characterized by warm summers and cool winters with light to no snowfall. The average annual temperature in Nagara is 14.8 °C. The average annual rainfall is 1639 mm with September as the wettest month. The temperatures are highest on average in August, at around 25.7 °C, and lowest in January, at around 4.8 °C.

== Demographics ==
Per Japanese census data, the population of Nagara has declined in recent decades.

Historical population
| Year | Pop. | ±% |
|---|---|---|
| 1950 | 9,812 | — |
| 1960 | 8,817 | −10.1% |
| 1970 | 7,514 | −14.8% |
| 1980 | 7,487 | −0.4% |
| 1990 | 8,285 | +10.7% |
| 2000 | 8,625 | +4.1% |
| 2010 | 8,035 | −6.8% |
| 2020 | 6,721 | −16.4% |

== History ==
Nagara is part of ancient Kazusa Province. The village of Nagara was established with the creation of the modern municipalities system on April 1, 1889. Nagara was raised to town status in 1955 by merging with the neighboring village of Hiyoshi, and part of the village of Mizukami.

== Economy ==
The primary economic activities are agriculture and golf courses.

== Government ==
Nagara has a mayor-council form of government with a directly elected mayor and a unicameral town council of 12 members. Together with the other municipalities of Chōsei District, Nagara contributes one member to the Chiba Prefectural Assembly. In terms of national politics, the town is part of Chiba 11th district of the lower house of the Diet of Japan.

== Education ==
Nagara has two public elementary schools and one public middle school operated by the town government. The town does not have a high school.

== Transportation ==
=== Railways ===
Nagara is not served by any passenger train lines. The closest train station to Nagara is the Sotobō Line at Mobara Station.

=== Bus service ===
Kominato Bus, a service of the Kominato Railway Company.

=== Highways ===
Nagara is not located on any national highway.

- Prefectural Route 13, Ichihara-Mobara
- Prefectural Route 14, Chiba-Mobara

== Local attractions ==
- Gensō-ji
- Japan Aerobics Center
- Nagara cave tombs, National Historic Site
- Nagara Dam

== Notable people from Nagara ==
- Shibata Ainosuke, action-film actor
- Minoru Ōta, admiral of the Imperial Japanese Navy
