= Minoru Ōta =

Imperial Japanese Navy admiral

- 大田 実
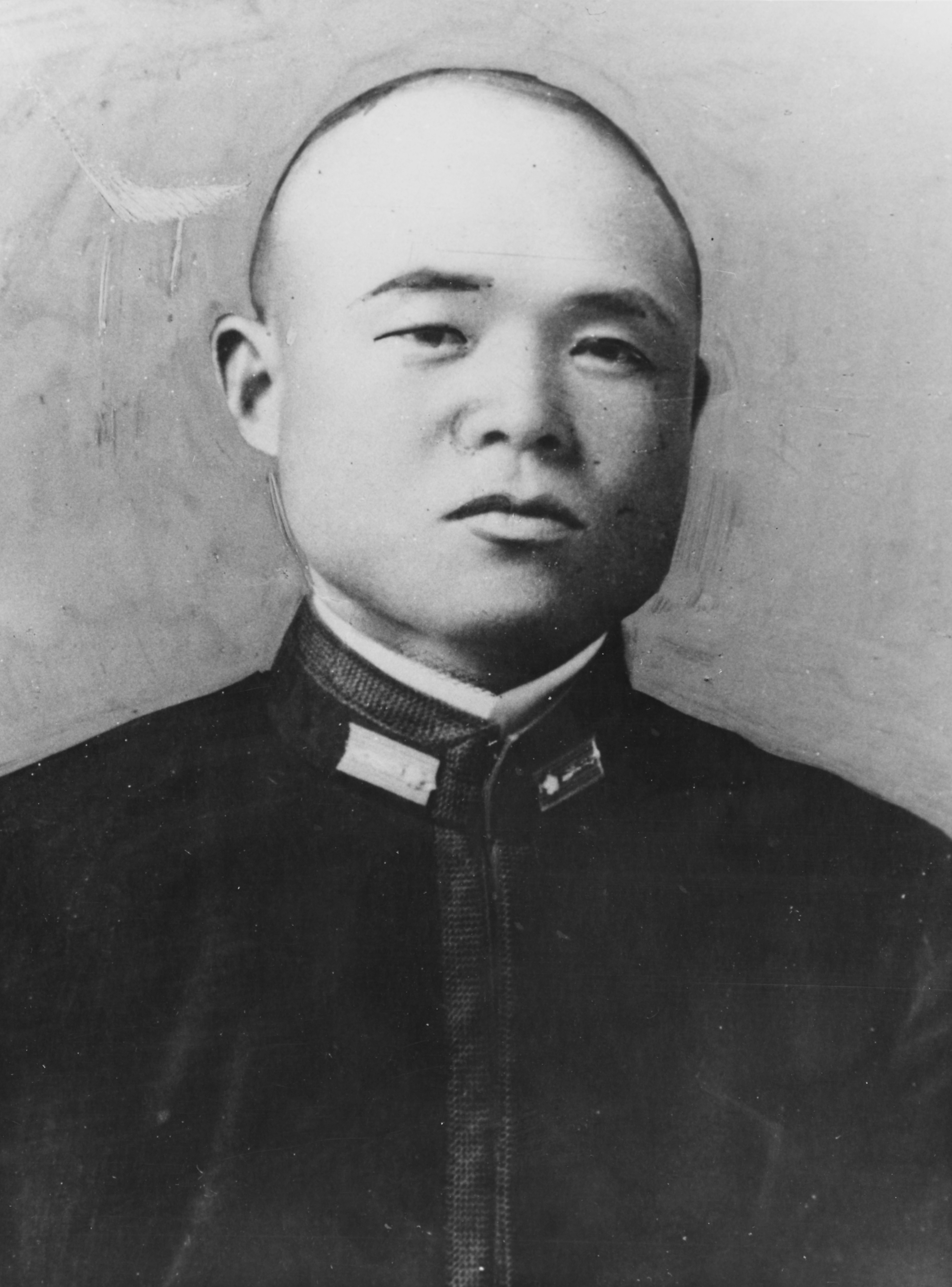
- Born: 7 April 1891; Nagara, Japan
- Died: 13 June 1945 (aged 54); Okinawa, Japan
- Military career
- Allegiance: Empire of Japan
- Branch: Imperial Japanese Navy
- Service years: 1913–1945
- Rank: Vice Admiral (posthumous)
- Conflicts: January 28 incident; Second Sino-Japanese War; World War II; Battle of Okinawa ‡‡

Minoru Ōta (大田 実, Ōta Minoru; 7 April 1891 – 13 June 1945) was an admiral in the Imperial Japanese Navy during World War II, and the final commander of the Japanese naval forces defending the Oroku Peninsula during the Battle of Okinawa.

== Biography ==
Ōta was a native of Nagara, Chiba. He graduated 64th out of 118 cadets from the 41st class of the Imperial Japanese Navy Academy in 1913. Ōta served his midshipman duty on the cruiser Azuma on its long-distance training voyage to Honolulu, San Pedro, San Francisco, Vancouver, Victoria, Tacoma, Seattle, Hakodate and Aomori. After his return to Japan, he was assigned to the battleship Kawachi, and after he was commissioned an ensign, to the battleship Fusō. After promotion to lieutenant in 1916, he returned to naval artillery school, but was forced to take a year off active service from November 1917 to September 1918 due to tuberculosis. On his return to active duty, he completed coursework in torpedo school and advanced courses in naval artillery. After brief tours of duty on the battleships Hiei and Fusō, he returned as an instructor at the Naval Engineering College.

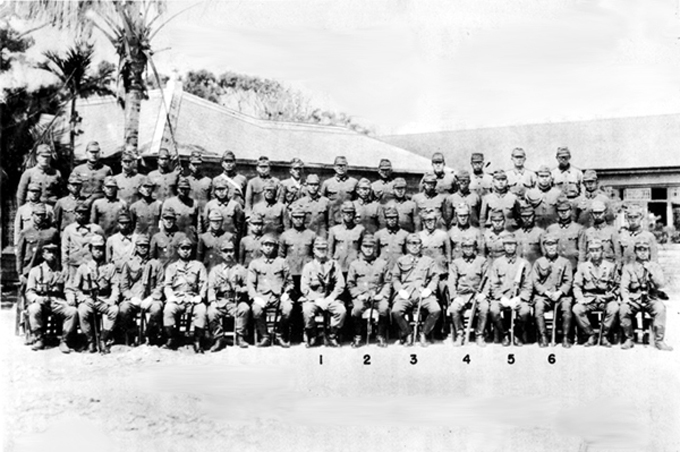
Japanese commanders on Okinawa prior to the Battle of Okinawa

Ōta also had experience with the Japanese Special Naval Landing Forces (SNLF, the Japanese equivalent of the Royal Marines), as he had been assigned command of a battalion of SNLF forces in the 1932 First Shanghai Incident. He was promoted to commander in 1934. In 1936, he was named executive officer of the battleship Yamashiro, and was finally given his first command, that of the oiler Tsurumi in 1937. He was promoted to captain in December the same year.

=== World War II ===
In 1938, with the start of the Second Sino-Japanese War, Ōta was assigned to command the Kure 6th SNLF. In 1941, he was assigned to the command of the SNLF under the Japanese China Area Fleet at Wuhan in China. He returned to Japan the following year, and was assigned to command the 2nd Combined Special Naval Landing Force that was earmarked for the seizure of Midway in the event of a Japanese victory over the United States Navy at the Battle of Midway. Although this never came to pass, he was promoted to rear admiral and commanded the 8th Combined Special Naval Landing Force at New Georgia against the American First Raider Battalion. He then served in various administrative capacities until January 1945, when he was reassigned to Okinawa to command the Japanese Navy's forces as part of the Japanese reinforcement effort prior to the anticipated invasion by Allied forces.

In Okinawa, Ōta commanded a force with a nominal strength of 10,000 men. However, half were civilian laborers conscripted into service with minimal training, and the remainder were gunners from various naval vessels with little experience in fighting on land. Allied sources are contradictory on his role as commander of the naval elements in Okinawa. Some cite Ōta as able to organize and lead them into an effective force, which fought aggressively against the Allied forces, "withdrawing slowly back to the fortified Oroku Peninsula." But Naval elements, except for outlying islands were headquartered on the Oroku peninsula from the beginning of the battle. Operations Planning Colonel Hiromichi Yahara of the Japanese 32nd Army describes a miscommunication occurring in the order for Ota's Naval elements to withdraw from the Oroku Peninsula to support the army further south. What actually happened is clear: Ōta began preparations on or around 24 May, for the withdrawal of all Naval elements to the south in support of the Army. He destroyed most heavy equipment, stocks of ammunition and even personal weapons. While in mid-march to the south, 32nd Army HQ ordered Ōta back into the Oroku peninsula citing that a mistake had been made in timing (explanations vary). Naval elements returned to their former positions with no heavy weapons and about half the troops had no rifles. The Americans, who had not noticed the initial withdrawal attacked and cut off the peninsula by attacks from the north on land, and one last seaborne landing behind the Navy's positions. Naval elements then committed suicide with whatever weapons possible, with some leading a last charge out of the cave entrances. According to the museum for the underground Naval Headquarters in Okinawa, "many soldiers committed suicide" inside the command bunker, including Ōta.

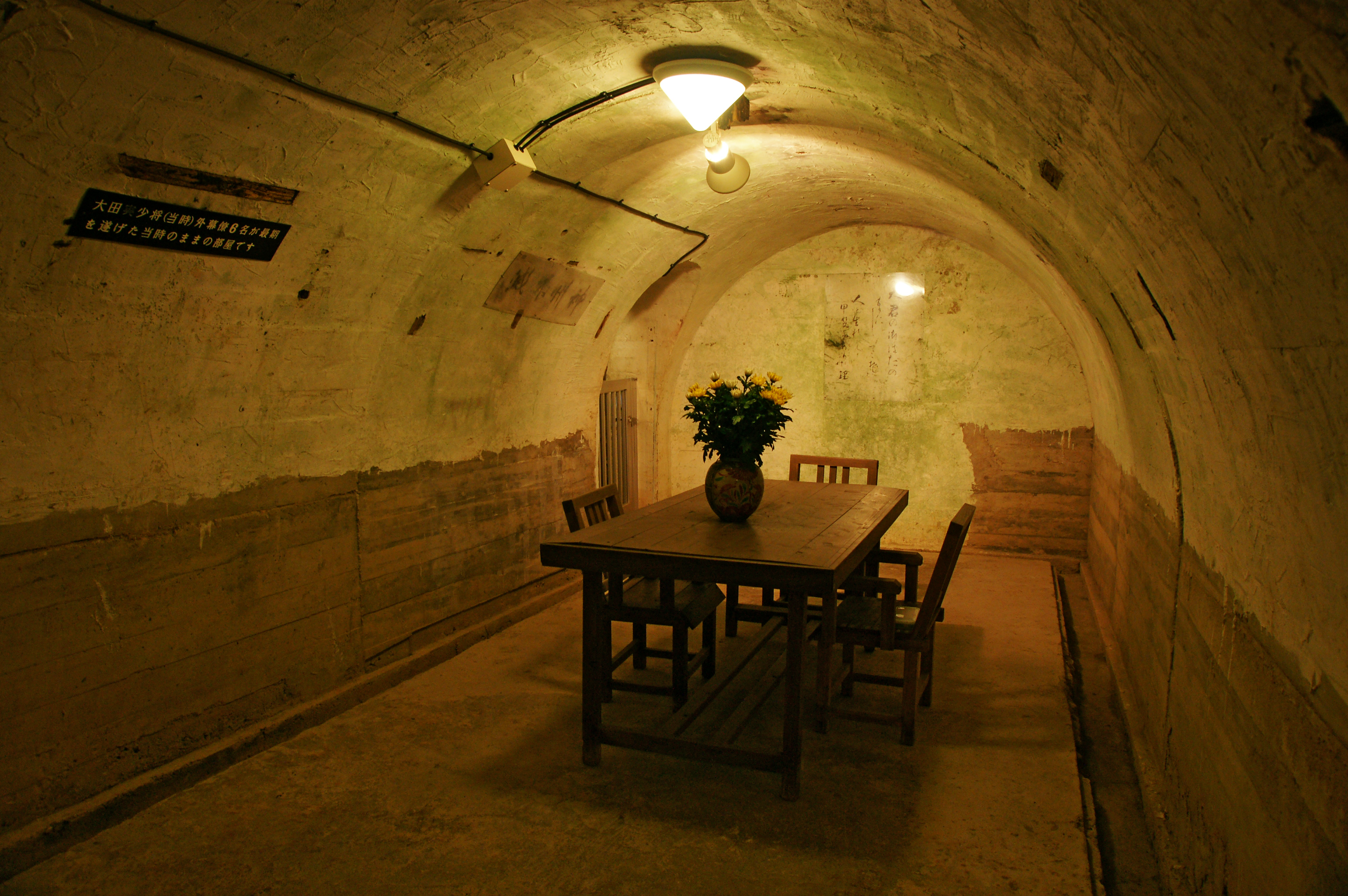
The Commander's Room of the underground Naval Headquarters. Ōta committed suicide here.

On 6 June, Admiral Ōta sent a final telegram to IJN headquarters, recognizing the immense suffering and unwavering dedication of Okinawan civilians. He concluded with a plea for 'special consideration' for the Okinawan people. On 11 June 1945, the U.S. 6th Marine Division encircled Ōta's positions, and Ōta sent a farewell telegram to the IJA 32nd Army Headquarters at 16:00 on 12 June. On 13 June, Ōta committed suicide with a handgun. He was posthumously promoted to vice admiral.

== Final message ==
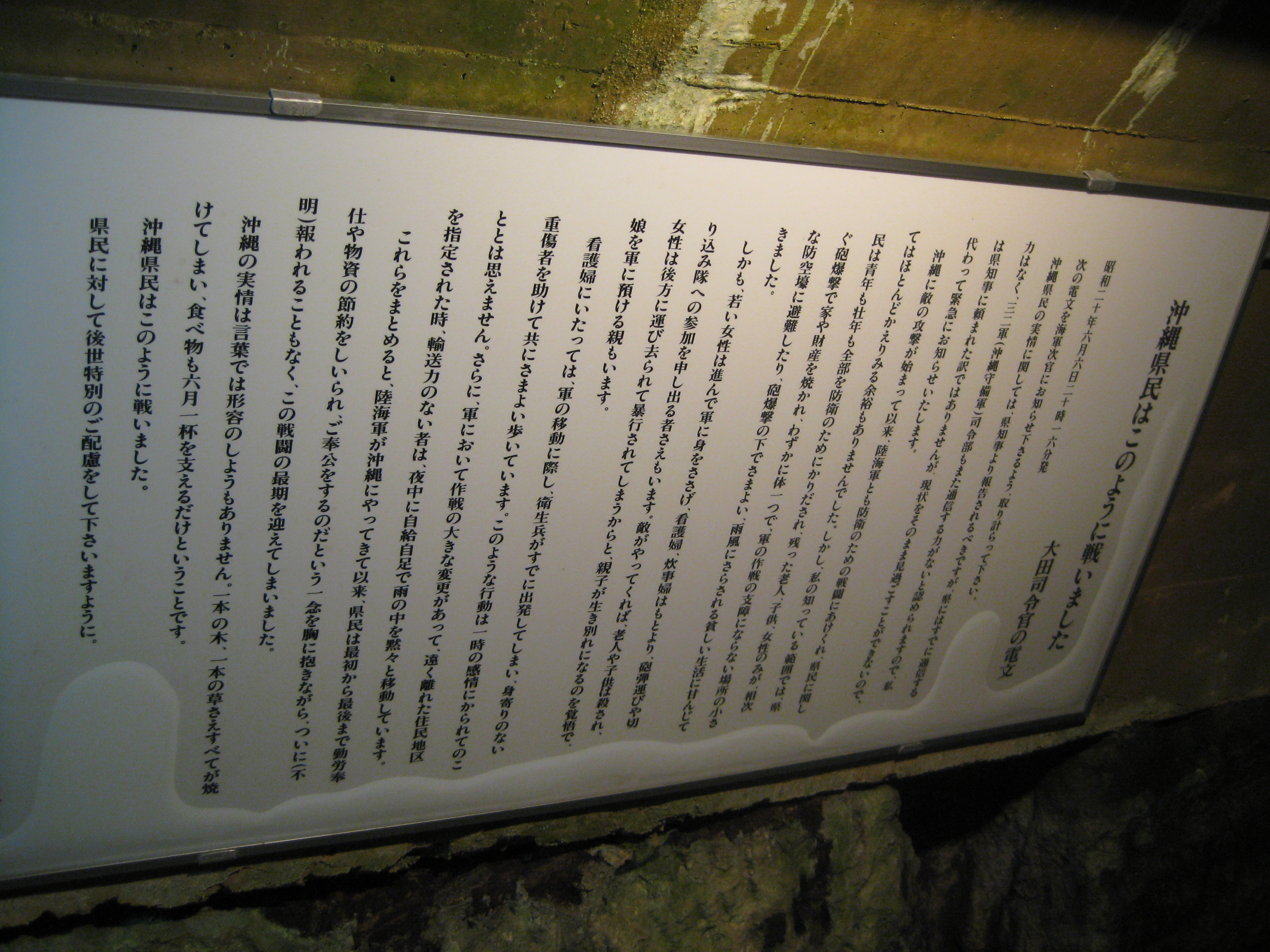
Last telegram to Vice-Admiral(Japanese modern translation)

(There are illegible parts.)

From the commander of Okinawan forces to the vice minister of Ministry of the Navy.

Please pass this telegram to vice minister (illegible).

Sent at 20:16 on the 6th of June, 1945:

"Message number 062016

Please convey the following telegram to the Vice Admiral. The Prefectural Governor should be the person to relay this report on the present condition of the war on Okinawa, but the Okinawa Prefectural Government has no means of communication, and the 32nd Division Headquarters appear to be thoroughly occupied with their own correspondence traffic. I feel compelled to file this urgent report though it is without the consent of the Prefectural Governor.

Since the enemy attacks began, our Army and Navy have been fighting defensive battles and have not been able to attend to the people of this prefecture.

Consequently, due to our negligence, these innocent people have lost their homes and property to enemy assault. Every man has been conscribed to defense while women, children, and elders are forced into hiding in the small underground shelters which are not tactically significant or are exposed to shelling, air raids, and (illegible) wind and rain. Moreover, girls have devoted themselves to nursing and cooking, as well as volunteering to carry ammunition and join in attacking the enemy.

This leaves the village people vulnerable to enemy attack where they will surely be killed. In desperation, some parents have asked the military to protect their daughters, for fear that when the enemy comes, elders and children will be killed and young women and girls will be taken to private areas and harmed.

After military medical personnel had moved on, the volunteer nurses stayed behind to help the badly wounded move. They are dedicated and go about their work with a strong will.

The military has changed its operations, forcing people to evacuate residential areas. Those without transportation trudge on in the dark and rain, without complaining, all the while searching for food. Ever since our Army and Navy have occupied Okinawa, the inhabitants of this prefecture have endured these constant hardships.

The Okinawan people have been asked to volunteer their labor and conserve all their resources (mostly without complaint.) In their heart, they wish only to serve as loyal Japanese. Finally, (illegible). This battle is nearing its end, the situation of the island of Okinawa (illegible).

There are no trees, no grass; everything is burnt to the ground. The food supply will be gone by the end of June. This is how the Okinawan people have fought the war.

And for this reason, I appeal to you to give the Okinawan people special consideration from this day forward."
