= Chōnan =

Chōnan 長南町
- Town
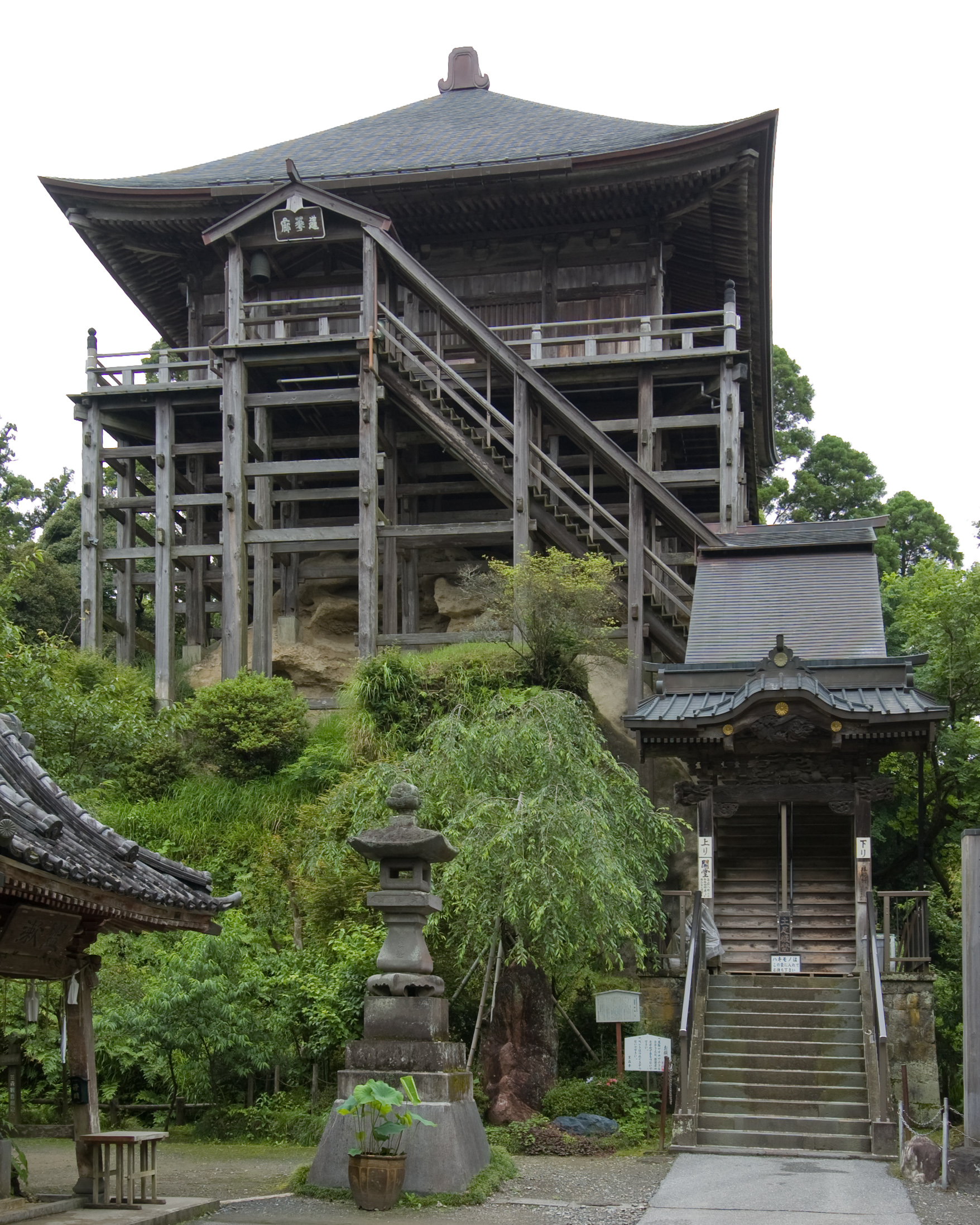
- Kasamori-ji in Chonan

- Flag Seal

- Location of Chōnan in Chiba Prefecture

- Coordinates: 35°23′N 140°14′E
- Country: Japan
- Region: Kantō
- Prefecture: Chiba
- District: Chōsei

Area
  - Total: 65.38 km^{2} (25.24 sq mi)

Population (December 31, 2020)
  - Total: 7,743
  - Density: 118.4/km^{2} (306.7/sq mi)
- Time zone: UTC+9 (Japan Standard Time)
- Symbols
  - Tree: Japanese cypress
  - Flower: Cherry blossom, safflower
  - Bird: Japanese bush-warbler
- Phone number: 0475-46-2111
- Address: 2110 Chōnan, Chōnan-machi, Chōsei-gun, Chiba-ken 297-0121
- Website: Official website

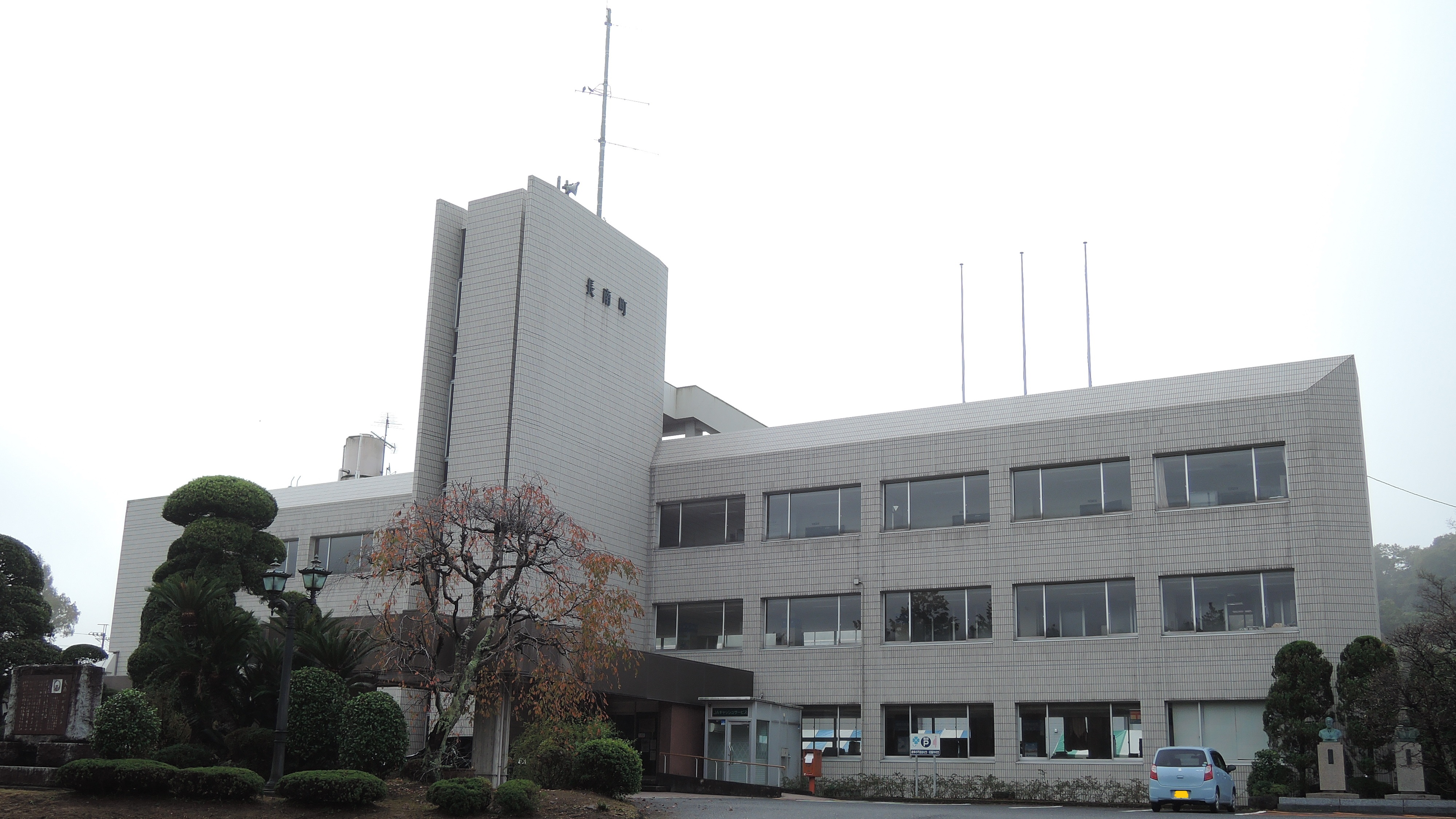
Chōnan town hall

Chōnan (長南町, Chōnan-machi) is a town located in Chiba Prefecture, Japan. As of 1 December 2020, the town had an estimated population of 7,743 in 3240 households and a population density of 120 persons per km^{2}. The total area of the town is 65.38 square kilometres (25.24 sq mi).

== Geography ==
Located in the mountainous terrains that divides the Bōsō Peninsula, Chōnan has relatively little flat land. Like other municipalities in the region, the town maintains agricultural reservoirs. Several golf courses dot the landscape. Chōnan is located in the southeastern part of Chiba prefecture, about 25 kilometers from the prefectural capital at Chiba, and 50 to 60 kilometers from the center of Tokyo.

=== Neighboring municipalities ===
Chiba Prefecture

- Ichihara
- Mobara
- Mutsuzawa
- Nagara
- Ōtaki

=== Climate ===
Chōnan has a humid subtropical climate (Köppen Cfa) characterized by warm summers and cool winters with light to no snowfall. The average annual temperature in Chōnan is 15.1 °C. The average annual rainfall is 1684 mm with September as the wettest month. The temperatures are highest on average in August, at around 25.9 °C, and lowest in January, at around 5.3 °C.

== Demographics ==
Per Japanese census data, the population of Chōnan has declined over the past 70 years.

Historical population
Year	Pop.	±%
1950	15,908	—
1960	14,118	−11.3%
1970	11,906	−15.7%
1980	11,509	−3.3%
1990	11,482	−0.2%
2000	10,628	−7.4%
2010	9,073	−14.6%
2020	7,198	−20.7%

== History ==
Chōnan is rich in archeological sites from the Jōmon period, Yayoi period, and Kofun period periods. Under the ritsuryō reforms of the Nara period the area of present-day Chōnan became part of Kazusa Province. Two Tendai Buddhist temples were established in this period, Kasamori-ji and Chōfuku-ji. At the end of the Heian period the area came under the control of the military leader Taira no Tadatsune, and his descendants continued their control of the area in the Kamakura period. In the 1456 the Takeda clan built Chōnan Castle as an extension of the larger Mariyatsu Castle. After the establishment of the Tokugawa shogunate Chōnan became a major distribution center of goods, most notably salt, passing through the Bōsō Peninsula. The modern town of Chōnan was created on February 11, 1955, from the merger of the former town of Chōnan with neighboring villages of Nishimura, Higashimura and Toyosaka.

== Government ==
Chōnan has a mayor-council form of government with a directly elected mayor and a unicameral town council of 13 members. Together with the other municipalities in Chōsei District, Chōnan contributes one member to the Chiba Prefectural Assembly. In terms of national politics, the town is part of Chiba 11th district of the lower house of the Diet of Japan.

== Economy ==
The principal agricultural output of Chōnan is rice, and shiitake mushrooms and lotus root are cultivated in the town. There are also some small-scale dairy farms.

== Education ==
Chōnan has one public elementary school and one public middle school operated by the town government. The town does not have a public high school.

== Transportation ==
=== Railway ===
Chōnan does not have any passenger railway service.

=== Highway ===
- Ken-Ō Expressway
- National Route 409

== Visitor attractions ==
- Chōfukuju-ji
- Hōon-ji
- Kasamori-ji
- Kasamori Temple Forest Nature Area
- Shōen-ji
- Shōtoku-ji
