= Nyoirin-ji =

Buddhist temple in Chiba Prefecture, Japan

Nyoirin-ji 如意輪寺
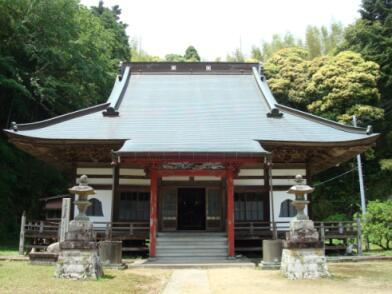
- Nyoirin-ji

Religion
- Affiliation: Buddhism
- Deity: Shaka Nyōrai
- Rite: Nichiren-shū

Location
- Location: 624 Kōzeki, Mobara, Chiba Prefecture
- Country: Japan
- Interactive map of Nyoirin-ji 如意輪寺
- Coordinates: 35°26′41.02″N 140°15′0.33″E

Architecture
- Completed: ca. 1000

Website
- www1.ocn.ne.jp/~nyoirin/index.html

Nyoirin-ji (如意輪寺) is a Buddhist temple located in the city of Mobara in Chiba Prefecture. Nyoirin-ji is a Nichiren-sect temple noted for its ancient ginkgo tree. The temple is also near the remains of the Tonoyatsu Castle.

== History ==
Nyoirin-ji was built approximately 1,000 years ago by a Shingon priest. In 1470 the temple was transferred to the Kempon Hokke-shū sect of Nichiren Buddhism by Sadataka Sakai (1435–1520) of the Sakai clan, lord of nearby Kazusa Castle. The Hondō of Nyoirin-ji was constructed in 1711 after the previous structure was destroyed by fire.

== Transportation ==
Nyoirin-ji is located in the Kōzeki District of Mobara. It is accessible by bus from Mobara Station on the JR East Sotobō Line.
