= Ichinomiya Domain =

Feudal domain

Ichinomiya Domain 一宮藩
- under Tokugawa shogunate Japan
- 1826–1871
- Capital: Ichinomiya jin'ya
  - Type: Daimyō
- Historical era: Edo period
  - Established: 1826
  - Disestablished: 1871
- Today part of: part of Chiba Prefecture

Ichinomiya Domain (一宮藩, Ichinomiya-han) was a feudal domain under the Tokugawa shogunate of Edo period Japan, located in Kazusa Province (modern-day Chiba Prefecture), Japan. It was centered on Ichinomiya jin'ya in what is now the town of Ichinomiya, Chiba.

== History ==
Ichinomiya Castle was a mountain-top fortification built by the Satomi clan, rulers of most of the Bōsō Peninsula during the Sengoku period as protection for their northern holdings in eastern Kazusa Province. Following the Battle of Odawara in 1590, the Kantō region was assigned to Tokugawa Ieyasu by the warlord Toyotomi Hideyoshi, who also restricted the Satomi to Awa Province for their lukewarm support of his campaigns against the Later Hōjō clan. Tokugawa Ieyasu appointed Honda Tadakatsu, one of his hereditary retainers, to be daimyō of the new 100,000 koku Ōtaki Domain, and the old fortifications at Ichinomiya were abandoned.

Otaki Domain was subsequently reduced in size, with large portions becoming tenryō territory directly under the control of the Tokugawa shogunate or assigned as exclaves of other domains. Ichinomiya became an exclave of Hatsuta Domain of Kii Province, ruled by the Kanō clan.

In 1826, Kanō Hisatomo, the 5th daimyō of Hatsuta Domain, decided to relocate the seat of the clan from Kii Province to Ichinomiya in Kazusa Province, where his family continued to rule until the Meiji Restoration. The final daimyō of Ichinomiya Domain, Kanō Hisayoshi, was a strong supporter of rangaku, and imported western weapons to modernize his forces. However, he was stopped at Shimoda on his way to assist the Satchō Alliance forces at the Battle of Toba–Fushimi during the Boshin War and arrived too late for the battle. Under the new Meiji government he was appointed domain governor, until the abolition of the han system in July 1871 and subsequently became a viscount under the kazoku peerage. Ichinomiya Domain became "Ichinomiya Prefecture", which merged with the short lived "Kisarazu Prefecture" in November 1871, which later became part of Chiba Prefecture.

The domain had a population of 14,204 people in 2884 households per an 1869 census.

== Holdings at the end of the Edo period ==
As with most domains in the han system, Ichinomiya Domain consisted of several discontinuous territories calculated to provide the assigned kokudaka, based on periodic cadastral surveys and projected agricultural yields.

- Kazusa Province
  - 10 villages in Nagara District
- Shimōsa Province
  - 6 villages in Sōma District
- Kōzuke Province
  - 3 villages in Sai District
- Ise Province
  - 8 villages in Inabe District
  - 4 villages in Mie District
  - 3 villages in Taki District

== List of daimyōs ==
- Kanō clan (fudai) 1826–1871

#	Name	Tenure	Courtesy title	Court Rank	kokudaka
1	Kanō Hisatomo (加納久儔)	1826–1842	Tōtōmi-no-kami (遠江守)	Lower 5th (従五位下)	10,000 koku
2	Kanō Hisaakira (加納久徴)	1842–1864	Suruga-no-kami (駿河守)	Lower 5th (従五位下)	10,000 koku
3	Kanō Hisatsune (加納久恒)	1864–1867	Yamato-no-kami (大和守)	Lower 5th (従五位下)	10,000 koku
4	Kanō Hisayoshi (加納久宜)	1867–1871	Tōtōmi-no-kami (遠江守)	Lower 5th (従五位下)	13,000 koku
