= Chōsei District =

District of Chiba Prefecture, Japan

Coordinates: 35°23′N 140°22′E

Chōsei District, Chiba as of 2010

Chōsei District (長生郡, Chōsei-gun) is a district located in Chiba Prefecture, Japan. As of September 2010, the district has an estimated population of 63,382 and a density of 279 persons per km^{2}. The total area was 226.97 square kilometres (87.63 mi^{2}). The district formerly included all of the city of Mobara and a small portion of the city of Isumi.

== Towns and villages ==
- Chōnan
- Ichinomiya
- Mutsuzawa
- Nagara
- Shirako
- Chōsei

== Neighboring municipalities ==
- Mobara
- Ichihara
- Isumi
- Ōtaki
- Ōamishirasato

== Geography ==
Chōsei District occupies an area of central Chiba Prefecture to the east of the Bōsō Peninsula. The west of the district ranges from the Bōsō Hill Range to the Kujūkuri Plain; the east of the district runs along the broad coast of the Kujūkuri Beach on the Pacific Ocean. The Ichinomiya River (37.3 kilometres (23.2 mi)) emerges from the Bōsō Hill Range in Chōnan and empties into the Pacific Ocean at Kujukuri Beach in Chōsei.

== Early period ==
During the Edo period, almost all of the area present-day Chōsei District was tenryō territory under direct control of the central government and administered by various hatamoto, with the exception of Ichinomiya, most of which was under the rule of Ichinomiya Domain, a minor feudal domain of the Tokugawa shogunate ruled by the Kano clan.

== Modern period ==
Chōsei District was created on April 1, 1889 out of the merger of the short-lived early Meiji period districts of Nagara (3 towns, 17 villages) and Kamihabu (1 town, five villages). The administrative seat of the district was located in Mobara.

Chōsei District, since its creation, has seen extensive administrative reorganization. Shirakata Village was elevated to town status on February 11, 1940. Mobara was elevated to city status on April 1, 1952, and ceased to be part of Chōsei District. Taitō merged with Furusawa in Isumi District, and ceased to be part of Chōsei District. Nagara was raised to town status on April 29, 1955, and Honnō merged into the city of Mobara on May 1, 1972. Mutsuzawa was raised to town status on April 1, 1983. The district now consists of five towns and one village.

A plan to merge the municipalities of Chōsei District into the city of Mobara, and thus dissolve the district, was discussed beginning in 2002. The planning committee of 2002 failed to reach a consensus, as did the planning committee of 2004. A new planning committee, the Chōsei District Merger Committee (長生郡市合併協議会, Chōsei-gun Gappei Kyōgikai) was formed in 2007, but was dissolved after one year.

== Economy ==
The coastal areas of Chōsei District once depended on the fishing industry, but fishing in the district has been in long decline. The district has extensive greenhouse fruit and vegetable production. The mountainous areas of Nagara, Chonan, and Mutsuzawa were once major agricultural centers, but the district's proximity to the Keiyō Industrial Zone has transformed agricultural areas into centers of small-scale industry and housing complexes. Tourism in the coastal areas has increased due to the district's proximity and rail links to the greater Tokyo Metropolitan Area.
