= Ichinomiya, Chiba =

Ichinomiya 一宮町
- Town
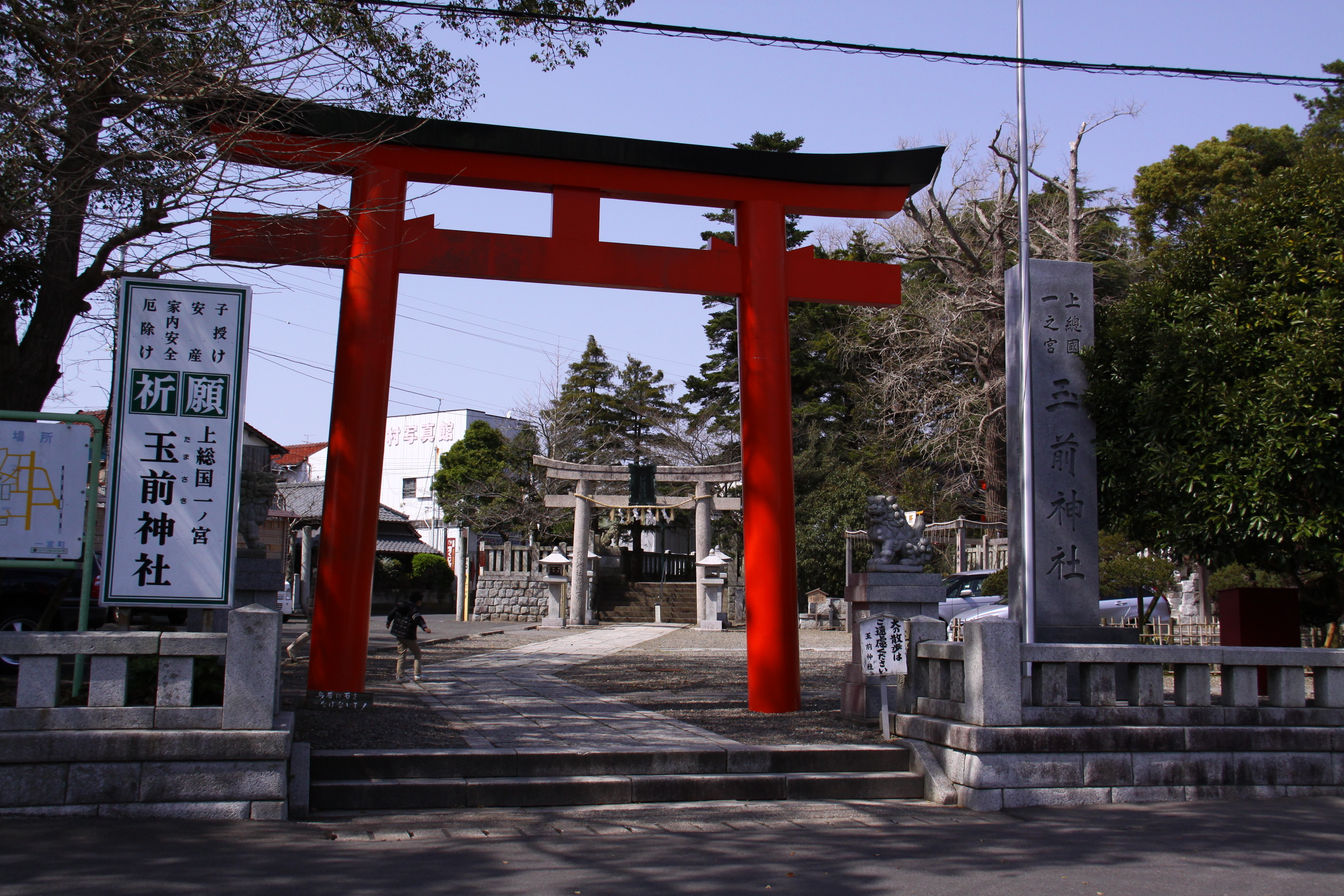
- Tamasaki Jinja torii gate

- Flag Emblem

- Location of Ichinomiya in Chiba Prefecture

- Coordinates: 35°22′N 140°22′E
- Country: Japan
- Region: Kantō
- Prefecture: Chiba
- District: Chōsei

Area
  - Total: 23.02 km^{2} (8.89 sq mi)

Population (December 31, 2020)
  - Total: 12,494
  - Density: 542.7/km^{2} (1,406/sq mi)
- Time zone: UTC+9 (Japan Standard Time)
- Tree: Japanese black pine
- Flower: Lilium auratum
- Phone number: 0475-42-2111
- Address: 2457 Ichinomiya, Ichinomiya-machi, Chōsei-gun, Chiba-ken 299-4396
- Website: Official website

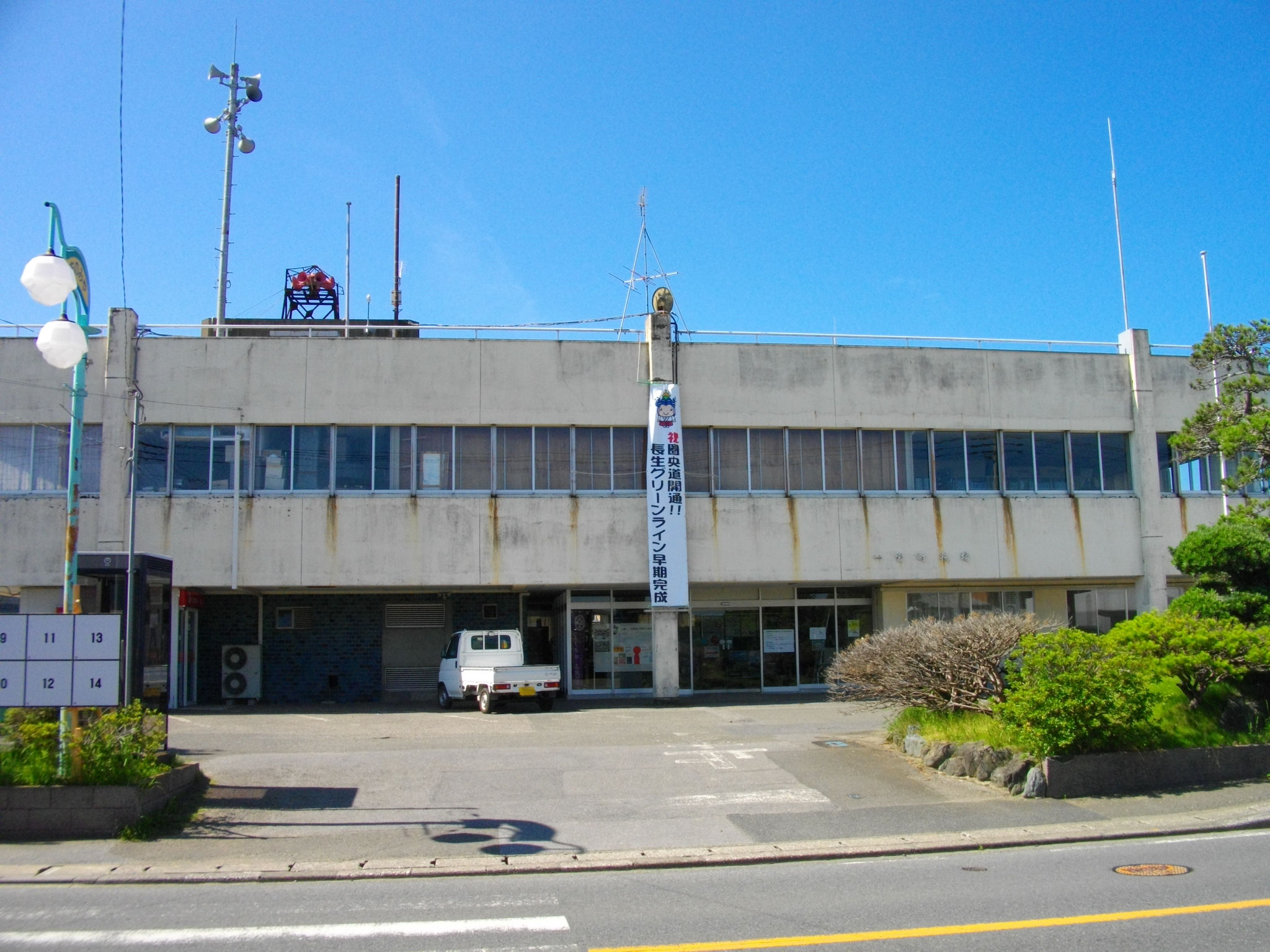
Ichinomiya town hall

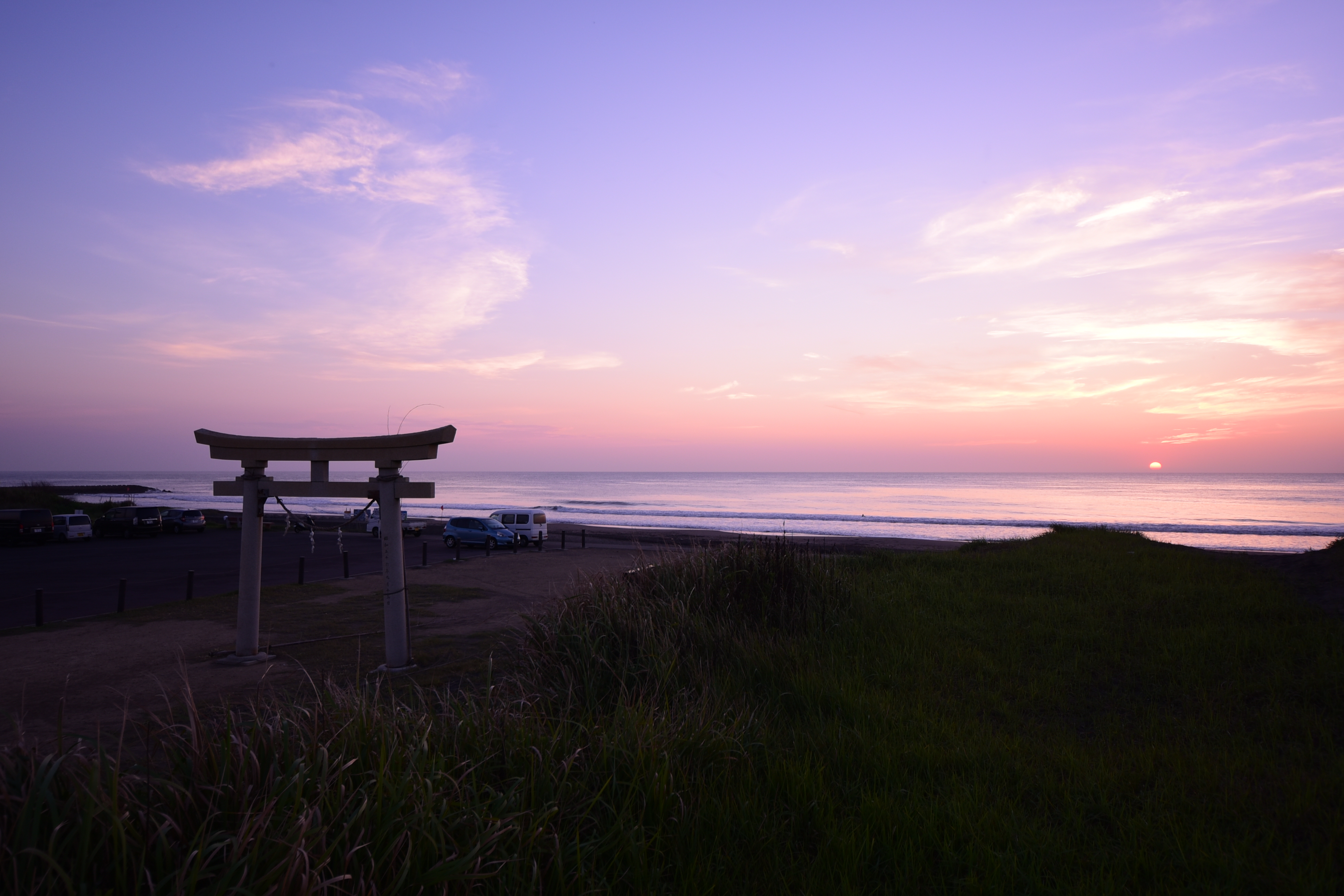
Tsurigasaki Surfing Beach

Ichinomiya (一宮町, Ichinomiya-machi) is a town located in Chiba Prefecture, Japan. As of 31 December 2020, the town had an estimated population of 12,494 in 5643 households and a population density of 540 persons per km^{2}. The total area of the town is 65.38 square kilometres (25.24 sq mi).

== Geography ==
Ichinomiya is located in the eastern part of Chiba prefecture, about 35 kilometers from the prefectural capital at Chiba and 60 to 70 kilometers from central Tokyo.

Facing the Pacific Ocean coast of central Bōsō Peninsula, the eastern part of the town includes a section of the popular Kujūkuri Beach, whereas the western part is in the Bōsō Hill Range with long and deep valleys extend into the forest, and there are scattered ponds for agricultural water.The Ichinomiya River crosses the north from east to west and flows into the Pacific Ocean. The highest elevations in the town are at Mount Shiroyama 150 metres (490 ft), a former castle site, Mount Takafuji 83 metres (272 ft), and Mount Gundari 70 metres (230 ft).

=== Neighboring municipalities ===
Chiba Prefecture

- Chōsei
- Isumi
- Mutsuzawa

=== Climate ===
Ichinomiya has a humid subtropical climate (Köppen Cfa) characterized by warm summers and cool winters with light to no snowfall. The average annual temperature in Ichinomiya is 15.4 °C. The average annual rainfall is 1717 mm with September as the wettest month. The temperatures are highest on average in August, at around 26.0 °C, and lowest in January, at around 5.8 °C.

== Demographics ==
Per Japanese census data, the population of Ichinomiya remained relatively steady over the past 70 years.

Historical population
Year	Pop.	±%
1950	10,953	—
1960	10,694	−2.4%
1970	9,929	−7.2%
1980	10,486	+5.6%
1990	11,135	+6.2%
2000	11,648	+4.6%
2010	12,034	+3.3%
2020	11,897	−1.1%

== History ==
The area of present-day Ichinomiya has been inhabited since prehistoric times. The area takes its name from the Tamasaki Shrine, the Ichinomiya, or first shrine of Kazusa Province. During the Sengoku period, the Satomi clan, the virtually independent rulers of the Bōsō Peninsula, established a castle at Ichinomiya. The area was devastated by the 1703 Genroku earthquake, during which a tsunami extended 1.5 kilometers inland from the coast. During the Edo period, a 13,000 koku feudal domain called Ichinomiya Domain ruled the area. After the start of the Meiji period, the area rapidly developed as a summer health resort, with many noted politicians, military figures, artists and writers establishing summer residences. Ichinomiya Town was created within Chōsei District with the establishment of the modern municipalities system on April 1, 1889. Ichinomiya merged with the neighboring village of Torami on November 3, 1953.

== Government ==
Ichinomiya has a mayor-council form of government with a directly elected mayor and a unicameral town council of 13 members. Together with the other municipalities in Chōsei District, Ichinomiya contributes one member to the Chiba Prefectural Assembly. In terms of national politics, the town is part of Chiba 11th district of the lower house of the Diet of Japan.

== Economy ==
The primary industry of Ichinomiya is specialized agriculture, with concentration on tomato, melons and fruits. The tourist and resort industry is also a major component of the local economy. The town is also located within the Minami Kantō gas field, and extraction of natural gas contributes to the local economy.

== Education ==
Ichinomiya has two public elementary schools and one public middle school operated by the town government. The town has one public high school operated by the Chiba Prefecture Board of Education. The prefectural also operates one special education school for the handicapped.

== Transportation ==
=== Railway ===
JR East – Sotobo Line

- Kazusa-Ichinomiya - Torami

=== Highway ===
- Kujukuri Toll Road
- National Route 128 to Togane or Tateyama

== Local attractions ==
- Kujūkuri Beach
- Tamasaki Jinja
