= Mobara =

Mobara 茂原市
- City
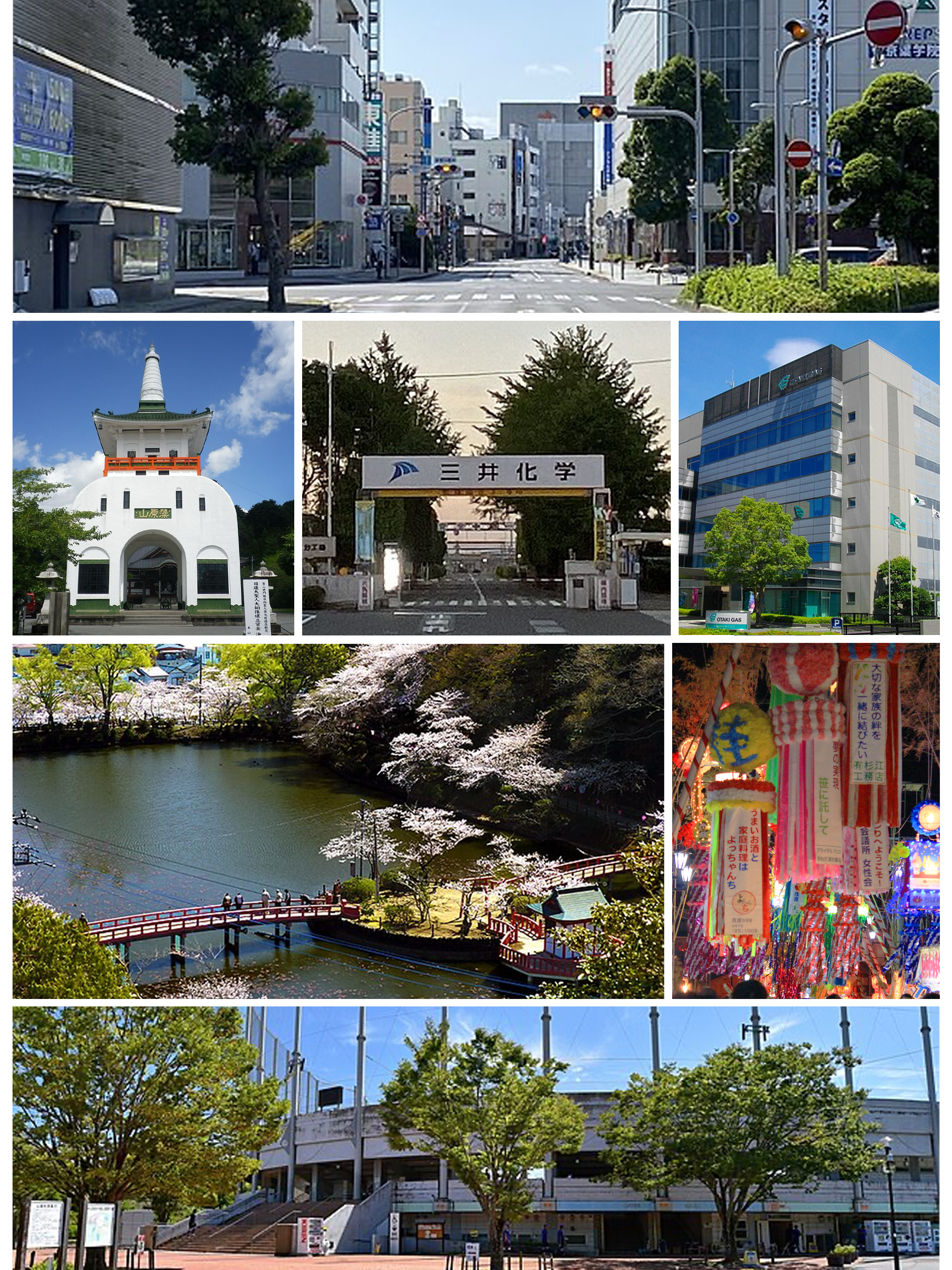
- Mobara City montage

- Flag Emblem

- Location of Mobara in Chiba Prefecture

- Coordinates: 35°25′42.7″N 140°17′17″E
- Country: Japan
- Region: Kantō
- Prefecture: Chiba

Area
  - Total: 99.92 km^{2} (38.58 sq mi)

Population (December 1, 2020)
  - Total: 88,330
  - Density: 884.0/km^{2} (2,290/sq mi)
- Time zone: UTC+9 (Japan Standard Time)
- Phone number: 0475-33-2111
- Address: 1 Dōbyō, Mobara-shi, Chiba-ken 297-8511
- Climate: Cfa
- Website: Official website
- Symbols
- Flower: Cosmos
- Tree: Azalea

Mobara (茂原市, Mobara-shi) is a city located in Chiba Prefecture. As of 1 December 2020, the city had an estimated population of 88,330 in 40,869 households and a population density of 880 persons per km^{2}. The total area of the city is 99.92 square kilometres (38.58 sq mi)

== Geography ==
Mobara is located in an inland area of north-central Bōsō Peninsula, about 25 kilometers from the prefectural capital at Chiba and 50 to 60 kilometers from the center of Tokyo. Most of the city is the Kujukuri Plain, and the mountains in the western part of the city are formed by the Bōsō Hill Range. The elevation of the city is about 8 to 9 meters above sea level in the lowlands of the southeast, about 11 meters in the city, and 20 to 100 meters in the west, with a maximum of 117.7 meters. In some areas, land subsidence due to human factors such as pumping of surface groundwater and natural gas brackish water has become a problem, and subsidence of up to about 10 cm has been observed.

=== Surrounding municipalities ===
Chiba Prefecture

- Chōnan
- Ichihara
- Midori-ku
- Nagara
- Ōamishirasato
- Shirako

=== Climate ===
Mobara has a humid subtropical climate (Köppen Cfa) characterized by warm summers and cool winters with light to no snowfall. The average annual temperature in Mobara is 15.7 °C (60.3 °F). The average annual rainfall is 1,683.6 mm (66.28 in) with October as the wettest month. The temperatures are highest on average in August, at around 26.8 °C (80.2 °F), and lowest in January, at around 5.2 °C (41.4 °F).

Climate data for Mobara (1991−2020 normals, extremes 1978−present)
Month	Jan	Feb	Mar	Apr	May	Jun	Jul	Aug	Sep	Oct	Nov	Dec	Year
Record high °C (°F)	21.5 (70.7)	25.7 (78.3)	26.0 (78.8)	29.8 (85.6)	34.9 (94.8)	35.4 (95.7)	38.2 (100.8)	39.9 (103.8)	38.3 (100.9)	34.0 (93.2)	26.6 (79.9)	24.8 (76.6)	39.9 (103.8)
Mean daily maximum °C (°F)	10.7 (51.3)	11.2 (52.2)	14.3 (57.7)	19.1 (66.4)	23.2 (73.8)	25.7 (78.3)	29.9 (85.8)	31.5 (88.7)	27.8 (82.0)	22.6 (72.7)	17.9 (64.2)	13.1 (55.6)	20.6 (69.1)
Daily mean °C (°F)	5.2 (41.4)	6.0 (42.8)	9.3 (48.7)	14.1 (57.4)	18.4 (65.1)	21.5 (70.7)	25.4 (77.7)	26.8 (80.2)	23.4 (74.1)	18.1 (64.6)	12.8 (55.0)	7.7 (45.9)	15.7 (60.3)
Mean daily minimum °C (°F)	0.3 (32.5)	1.1 (34.0)	4.3 (39.7)	9.2 (48.6)	14.0 (57.2)	18.0 (64.4)	22.0 (71.6)	23.3 (73.9)	20.0 (68.0)	14.3 (57.7)	8.3 (46.9)	2.8 (37.0)	11.5 (52.6)
Record low °C (°F)	−7.4 (18.7)	−7.8 (18.0)	−3.4 (25.9)	−1.2 (29.8)	5.0 (41.0)	9.7 (49.5)	14.0 (57.2)	15.6 (60.1)	9.8 (49.6)	2.8 (37.0)	−1.0 (30.2)	−5.3 (22.5)	−7.8 (18.0)
Average precipitation mm (inches)	85.1 (3.35)	75.2 (2.96)	140.6 (5.54)	131.8 (5.19)	142.7 (5.62)	181.1 (7.13)	144.5 (5.69)	107.7 (4.24)	229.5 (9.04)	265.3 (10.44)	107.7 (4.24)	74.4 (2.93)	1,683.6 (66.28)
Average precipitation days (≥ 1.0 mm)	6.3	6.9	11.1	10.7	10.1	11.6	9.7	7.4	11.2	11.8	8.9	6.6	112.3
Mean monthly sunshine hours	181.5	161.0	163.1	175.6	179.6	130.1	164.6	200.1	137.7	126.0	144.1	163.6	1,925.4
Source: Japan Meteorological Agency

== Demographics ==
Per Japanese census data, the population of Mobara peaked around the year 2000 and has declined since.

Historical population
Year	Pop.	±%
1920	29,397	—
1930	31,014	+5.5%
1940	33,110	+6.8%
1950	45,753	+38.2%
1960	50,471	+10.3%
1970	58,203	+15.3%
1980	71,521	+22.9%
1990	83,437	+16.7%
2000	93,779	+12.4%
2010	93,015	−0.8%
2020	86,782	−6.7%

== History ==
=== Early history ===
Mobara was settled from the earliest times, as evidenced by archaeological sites and shell mounds dating from the Jōmon period and Yayoi periods. The city also has examples of kofun, or burial mounds, from the Kofun period. The area was the location of at least two shōen estates, the Mobara-sō and the Tachibana-sō, in the Heian period. At the beginning of the Edo period, in 1591, an extensive land survey was carried out by the Tokugawa clan.

=== Modern history ===
The town of Mobara was created during the early Meiji period establishment of the modern municipalities system on April 1, 1889, in Chōsei District. The Bōsō Tetsudo, now the JR Sotobō Line, was established in 1897 between Ichinomiya and Ōami Station in present-day Ōamishirasato. Mobara Station was one station established on the line, thus connecting Mobara to the wider rail network. In 1909 a handcar system ran from Mobara Station and Chōnan. The handcar railroad was constructed and operated by the prefecture.

=== World War II ===
A base for the 252 Air Group of the Imperial Japanese Navy (IJN), a fighter aircraft unit, was established in Mobara. In 1941, by order of the IJN, 100 residences and their associated farmland, schools, town halls, police substations, temples, and shrines were forcibly confiscated without warning to build the base. Mobara Airfield was completed using a kinrō dōin group that consisted of the forced labor of Korean residents in Japan and students from Chōsei Middle School students in 1943. The airfield was located on the east banks of the small Aku River, directly to the east of Mobara Station along the present-day JR East Sotobō Line, and consisted of a runway and 20 structures, some of them concealed underground. Tokubetsu kōgekitai, or kamikaze units, were sent from Mobara Airfield to the IJN Kokubu Air Corps in present-day Kirishima, Kagoshima Prefecture to attack American forces off Okinawa. The United States confiscated the airfield shortly after the surrender of Japan in 1945. Remains of the runway, approximately ten airfield structures, and a tunnel are now on the property of the Mitsui Chemicals.

=== Post-war history ===
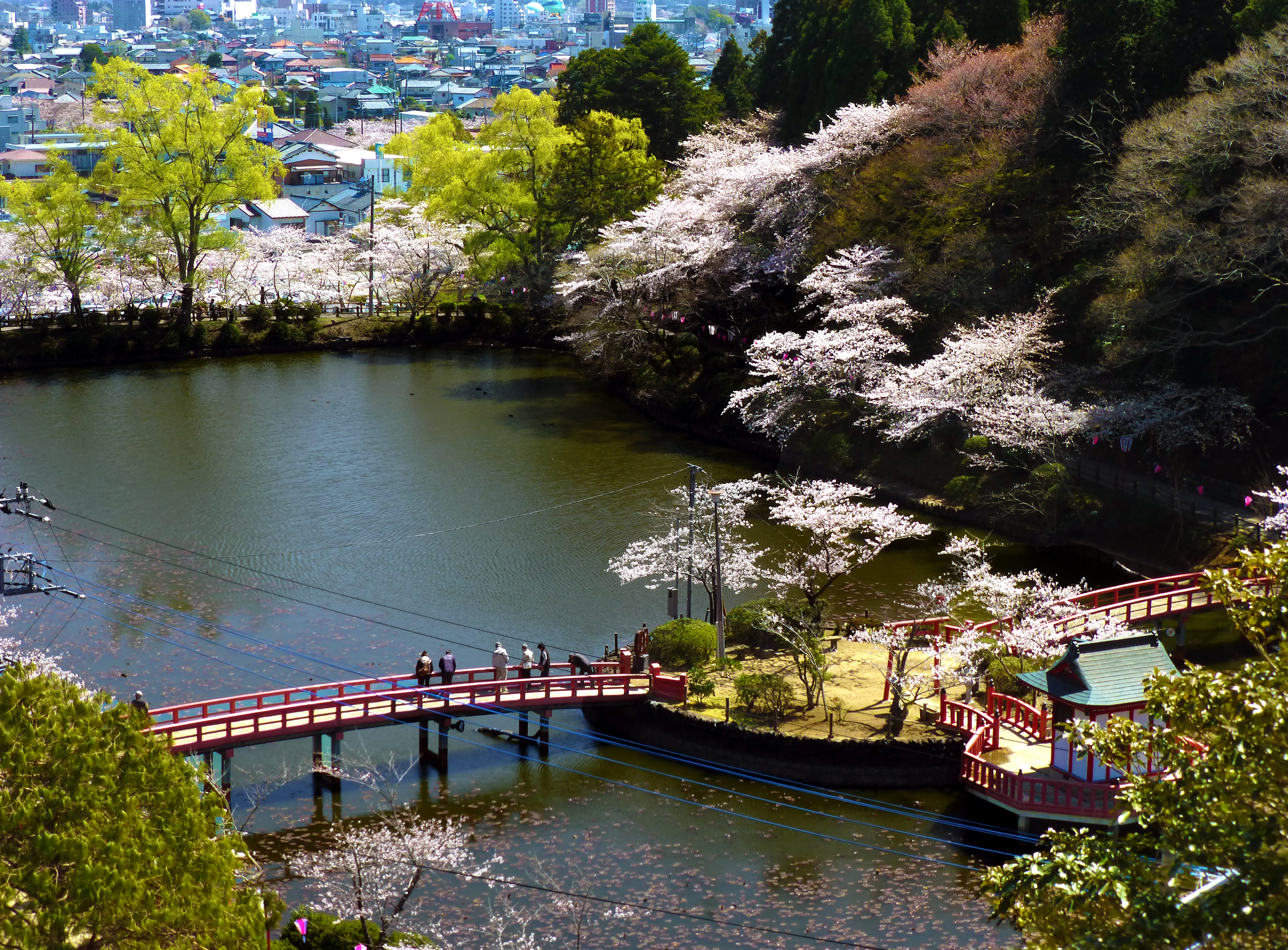
Mobara Park

At the end of World War II, the 113th Cavalry Regiment of the United States Army occupied the Mobara Airfield. The Japan Self-Defense Forces attempted to reoccupy the base in 1954, but after organized efforts by residents, agricultural organizations, the town and prefectural governments, the plans were abandoned the following year. The site was used to build Mobara Middle School for the rapidly expanding population of the town.

On April 1, 1952, Mobara Town expanded by annexation of neighboring villages of Tōgō, Toyoda, Ninomiya-Hongō, Tsurue, and Gogō and was elevated to city status. On April 1, 1955, Mobara annexed the town of Chōnan. On May 1, 1972, Mobara merged with the neighboring town of Honnō. On December 11, 1990, the city was hit by an F-3 tornado, which killed one person, injured 78, and damaged or destroyed 1,747 homes in the city.

== Government ==
Mobara has a mayor-council form of government with a directly elected mayor and a unicameral city council of 22 members. Mobara contributes two members to the Chiba Prefectural Assembly. In terms of national politics, the city is part of Chiba 11th district of the lower house of the Diet of Japan.

== Economy ==
Mobara serves as a regional commerce center for surrounding Chōsei District. The economy of Mobara is dominated by electronics manufacturing. Futaba Corporation, a major manufacturer of radio control models and toys, is headquartered in Mobara. Natural gas production is also important to the city; Kanto Natural Gas Development Co., Ltd. and Otaki Gas Co., Ltd. have headquarters here. Chemical production, centered on Mitsui Chemicals, is the largest producer of iodine in Japan. 40% of the total world production of iodine is produced in Mobara. Much land in Mobara is still used for rice production. Additionally, negi, or the ubiquitous Welsh onion of Japanese cuisine, is an important agricultural product.

== Education ==
Mobara has 14 public elementary schools and six public middle schools operated by the city government, and three public high schools operated by the Chiba Prefectural Board of Education. There is also one private high school.

== Transportation ==
=== Railway ===
JR East – Sotobō Line

- Honnō - Shin-Mobara - Mobara

=== Highway ===
- Ken-Ō Expressway
- National Route 128
- National Route 409

== Local attractions ==
- Nyoirin-ji - a Nichiren Buddhist temple
- Tachibana Jinja - a Shintō shrine connected with the Yamatotakeru mythology, the ninomiya of Kazusa Province

=== Tanabata festival ===
A popular annual event in Mobara is the Tanabata festival, during which a wide array of stalls and parades dominate much of the city's central shopping district. While the rest of Japan usually celebrates Tanabata on July 7, the Mobara festival is held in late July so as to coincide with school holidays.

== Sister cities ==
- Salisbury, South Australia, Australia, since May 25, 2002

== Notable people from Mobara ==
- Naoki Kawano, actor and musician
- Ishii Kikujirō, prewar diplomat and cabinet minister
- Michitaka Kobayashi, voice actor
- Yuko Ogura, gravure idol
- Yōko Shōji, manga artist
