= Chiba 11th district =

Legislative district of Japan

Chiba 11th District
- Parliamentary constituency for the Japanese House of Representatives
- Numbered map of Chiba Prefecture single-member districts
- Prefecture: Chiba
- Proportional District: Minamikantō
- Electorate: 365,194 (2015)

Current constituency
- Created: 1994
- Seats: One
- Party: LDP
- Representative: Eisuke Mori
- Created from: Chiba's 3rd "medium-sized" district
- Municipalities: Chiba's Mobara, Tōgane, Katsuura, Isumi, Sanmu, Ōamishirasato, Sanbu District, Chōsei District, and Isumi District

Chiba 11th district (千葉県第11区, Chiba-ken dai-jūikku or simply 千葉11区, Chiba-jūikku) is a single-member constituency of the House of Representatives in the national Diet of Japan located in the eastern portion of Chiba Prefecture. After re-districting in 2022 the constituency covers six cities: Mobara, Tōgane, Katsuura, Isumi, Sanmu and Ōamishirasato, and three districts: Sanbu, Chōsei, and Isumi. The district was created in 1994 as part of an electoral reform effort in the Japanese House of Representatives, and was first implemented in the 1996 general election.

As of 2015, this district was home to 365,194 constituents.

== List of representatives ==
Representative	Party	Dates	Notes
Eisuke Mori	LDP	1996–present	

== Election results ==
2026
Party	Candidate	Votes	%	±%
LDP	Eisuke Mori	102,843	61.5	▲4.1
Centrist Reform	Ryō Tagaya	50,561	30.2	
JCP	Fumiaki Shiina	13,783	8.2	▼5.9
Registered electors		342,740		
Turnout			51.42	▲1.99
LDP hold				

2024
Party	Candidate	Votes	%	±%
LDP	Eisuke Mori (endorsed by Kōmeitō)	92,187	57.43	
Reiwa	Ryō Tagaya (won PR seat)	45,616	28.42	
JCP	Fumiaki Shiina	22,720	14.15	
Turnout			49.43	▼1.95
LDP hold				

2021
Party	Candidate	Votes	%	±%
LDP	Eisuke Mori (endorsed by Kōmeitō)	110,538	64.4	▲4.4
JCP	Fumiaki Shiina	30,557	17.8	▲4.0
Reiwa	Ryō Tagaya (won PR seat)	30,432	17.7	
Turnout			51.38	▲2.24
LDP hold				

2017
Party	Candidate	Votes	%	±%
LDP	Eisuke Mori (endorsed by Kōmeitō)	103,919	60.0	▼3.1
Kibō no Tō	Ryō Tagaya	45,345	26.2	
JCP	Fumiaki Shiina	23,968	13.8	▼1.0
Turnout			49.14	▼1.14
LDP hold				

2014
Party	Candidate	Votes	%	±%
LDP	Eisuke Mori (endorsed by Kōmeitō)	110,965	63.14	
People's Life	Ken'ichi Kaneko	38,783	22.07	
JCP	Fumiaki Shīna	25,997	14.79	

2012
Party	Candidate	Votes	%	±%
LDP	Eisuke Mori (endorsed by Kōmeitō)	128,785	65.04	
Tomorrow	Ken'ichi Kaneko (endorsed by NPD)	48,114	24.30	
JCP	Fumiaki Shīna	21,110	10.66	

2009
Party	Candidate	Votes	%	±%
LDP	Eisuke Mori (endorsed by Kōmeitō)	116,937	49.7	
Democratic	Ken'ichi Kaneko (endorsed by PNP) (elected in PR block)	112,707	47.9	
Happiness Realization	Tsukasa Kuga	5,489	2.3	

2005
Party	Candidate	Votes	%	±%
LDP	Eisuke Mori (endorsed by Kōmeitō)	145,176	62.65	
Democratic	Masahide Tsuchiya	70,589	30.46	
JCP	Jūji Kobayashi	15,968	6.89	

2003
Party	Candidate	Votes	%	±%
LDP	Eisuke Mori (endorsed by Kōmeitō, NCP)	130,863	63.1	
Democratic	Hiroyuki Nagahama	60,296	29.1	
JCP	Kyōko Maeda	16,358	7.9	

2000
Party	Candidate	Votes	%	±%
LDP	Eisuke Mori	135,151	66.4	
Democratic	Masahito Matsumoto	45,465	22.3	
JCP	Yoshio Kogure	23,064	11.3	

1996
Party	Candidate	Votes	%	±%
LDP	Eisuke Mori	116,195	61.2	
New Frontier	Kouichi Hatsutani	45,894	24.3	
JCP	Moriko Īmura	21,954	11.6	
Liberal League	Naoko Hara	4,600	2.4	
