= Kazusa Province =

Former province of Japan

Kazusa Province 上総国
- Province of Japan
- 7th century–1868
- Map of Japanese provinces (1868) with Kazusa Province highlighted
- Capital: Ichihara District
- History
  - Established: 7th century
  - Disestablished: 1868
Preceded by	Succeeded by
Fusa Province	Chiba Prefecture
- Today part of: Chiba Prefecture

Kazusa Province (上総国, Kazusa no Kuni; Japanese pronunciation: [kä́.(d͡)zɨ̀.sä̀ (nò̞ kɯ̈̀.ɲ̟ì), kä̀.(d͡)zɨ́.sä́ (nò̞ kɯ̈̀.ɲ̟ì)]) was a province of Japan in the area of modern Chiba Prefecture. The province was located in the middle of the Bōsō Peninsula, whose name takes its first kanji from the name of Awa Province and its second from Kazusa and Shimōsa provinces. Its abbreviated form name was Sōshū (総州) or Nansō (南総). The borders of Kazusa Province were defined by Shimōsa Province to the north, the Pacific Ocean to the east, Awa Province to the south, and Tokyo Bay to the west.

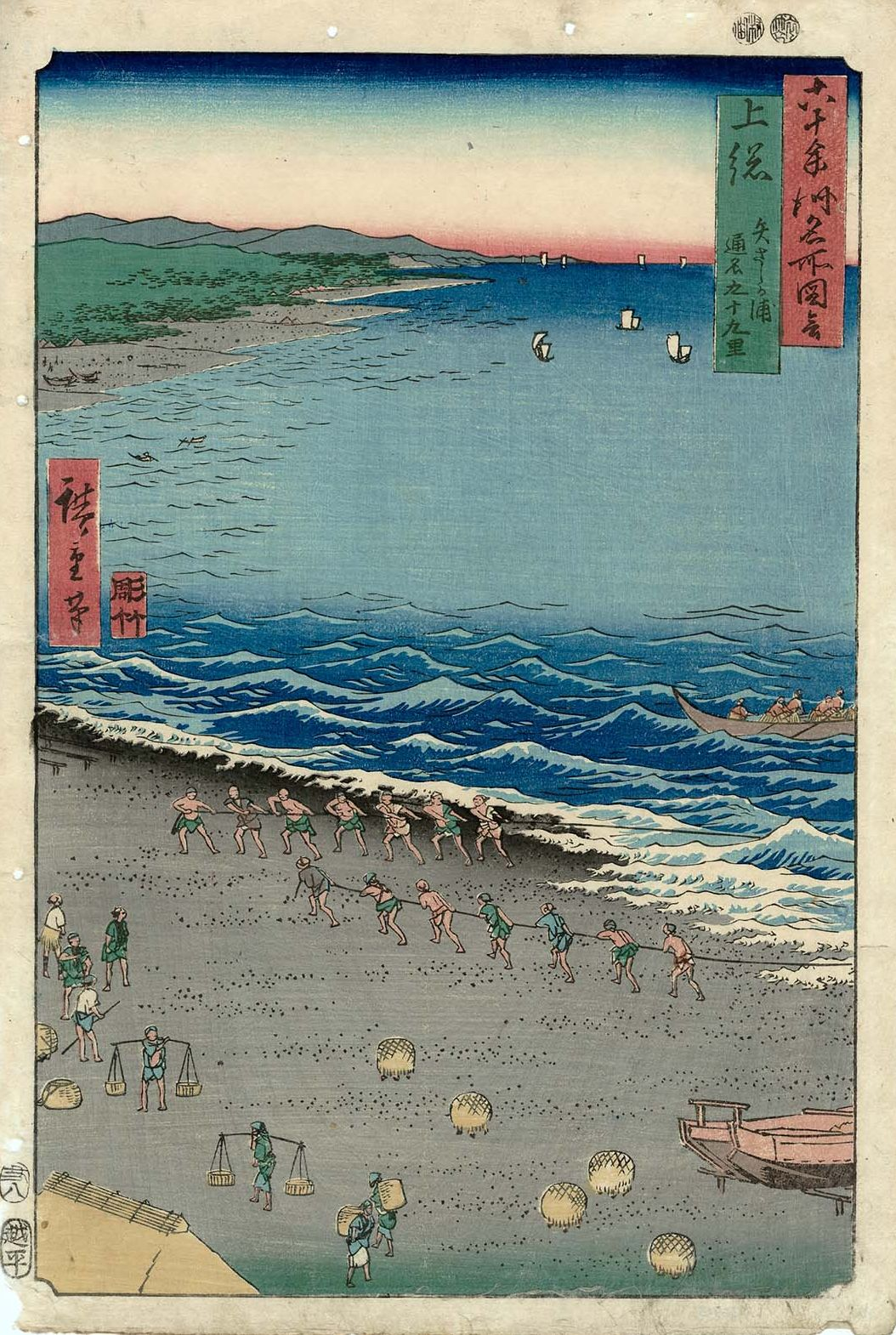
Hiroshige ukiyo-e "Kazusa" in "The Famous Scenes of the Sixty States" (六十余州名所図会), depicting Kujūkuri Beach

Kazusa was classified as one of the provinces of the Tōkaidō. Under the Engishiki classification system, Kazusa was ranked as a "great country" (大国) and a "far country" in relation to its distance from the capital (遠国). Along with Kōzuke and Hitachi, it was originally one of the provinces where an imperial prince was nominally assigned as governor.

== History ==
=== Early history ===
Kazusa was originally part of a larger territory known as Fusa Province (総国, occasionally 捄国, Fusa-no-kuni), which was divided into "upper" and “lower” portions (i.e. Kazusa and Shimōsa) during the reign of Emperor Kōtoku (645–654). It was well known to the Imperial Court in Nara -period Japan for its fertile lands, and is mentioned in Nara period records as having supplied hemp to the Court. Kazusa was divided into 15 counties, of which the four counties comprising the district of Awa were separated in 718 into a separate province. The exact location of the capital of Kazusa is not precisely known, but is believed to have been somewhere within the borders of the modern city of Ichihara, Chiba. The ruins of the kokubun-ji, or provincial temple, of Kazusa has been located in the Sōza district of Ichihara. The kokubun-ji was first excavated in 1949, and is on a plateau 30 metres (98 ft) above the Yōrō River in close proximity to Tokyo Bay. The site is protected as a Designated Historic Site of Japan. However, the Ichinomiya of Kazusa Province is the Tamasaki Shrine in what is now the town of Ichinomiya, Chiba, on the opposite coast of the province.

During the Heian period, the province was divided into numerous shōen controlled by local samurai clans, primarily the Chiba clan, which sided with Minamoto no Yoritomo in the Genpei War. During the Kamakura period, much of the province was under the control of the Ashikaga clan. By the early Muromachi period, the area was a highly contested region highly fragmented by various samurai clans. However, by the Sengoku period, the Satomi clan had gained control over much of Awa, Kazusa and Shimōsa provinces.

The Satomi provided only lukewarm support to Toyotomi Hideyoshi during the Battle of Odawara against the Later Hōjō clan and were subsequently deprived of their holdings in Kazusa and Shimōsa. After the installation of Tokugawa Ieyasu in Edo, Kazusa became part of the Tokugawa clan holdings, and Tokugawa hereditary retainer Honda Tadakatsu was promoted to daimyō of Ōtaki Domain (50,000 koku).

=== Edo period ===
During the Edo period, several small domains were created within the borders of Kazusa, most of which continued to be retained as tenryō territory owned directly by the shōgun and administered by various hatamoto. The entire province had an assessed revenue of 425,080 koku.

==== Edo period Domains in Kazusa Province ====
Domain	Daimyō	Dates	Revenue (koku)	Type
Kururi Domain (久留里藩)	Kuroda	1659–1871	30,000	fudai
Ōtaki Domain (大多喜藩)	Matsudaira (Nagasawa/Ōkōchi)	1590–1871	20,000	fudai
Iino Domain (飯野藩)	Hoshina	1648–1871	20,000	fudai
Sanuki Domain (佐貫藩)	Abe	1590–1871	16,000	fudai
Tsurumaki Domain (鶴牧藩)	Mizuno	1827–1871	15,000	fudai
Ichinomiya Domain (一宮藩)	Kanō	1826–1871	13,000	fudai
Jōzai Domain (請西藩)	Hayashi	1825–1865	10,000	fudai
Goi Domain (五井藩)	Arima	1781–1842	10,000	fudai
Kikuma Domain (菊間藩)	Mizuno	1868–1871	23,700	NA
Kokubo Domain (小久保藩)	Tanuma	1868–1871	10,000	NA
Ōami Domain (大網藩)	Yonekitsu	1868–1871	10,000	NA
Tsurumai Domain (鶴舞藩)	Inoue	1868–1871	10,000	NA
Matsuo Domain (松尾藩)	Ōta	1868–1871	53,350	NA
Sakurai Domain (桜井藩)	Matsudaira (Tatewaki)	1868–1871	10,000	NA

=== Abolishment ===
Following the Boshin War, Jōzai Domain was abolished for its opposition to the Meiji Restoration, and six minor domains were created for daimyō dispossessed with the creation of Sunpu Domain for the ex-shōgun Tokugawa Yoshinobu. These various domains and tenryō territories were transformed into short-lived prefectures in July 1871 by the abolition of the han system, and the entire territory of Kazusa Province became part of the new Chiba Prefecture on June 15, 1873.

== Historical districts ==
The area of former Kazusa Province was organized into nine districts by the Meiji period cadastral reforms, later reduced to five:

- Chiba Prefecture
  - Amaha District (ja:天羽郡) - merged with Mōda and Sue Districts to become Kimitsu District (ja: 君津郡) on April 1, 1897
  - Ichihara District (ja:市原郡) - dissolved
  - Isumi District (ja: 夷隅郡)
  - Kamihabu District (ja:上埴生郡) - merged with Nagara District to become Chōsei District (ja: 長生郡) on April 1, 1897
  - Mōda District (ja:望陀郡) - merged with Amaha and Sue Districts to become Kimitsu District on April 1, 1897
  - Musha District (ja:武射郡) - merged with Yamabe District to become Sanbu District (ja: 山武郡) on April 1, 1897
  - Nagara District (ja:長柄郡) - merged with Kamihabu District to become Chōsei District on April 1, 1897
  - Sue District (ja:周淮郡) - merged with Amaha and Mōda Districts to become Kimitsu District on April 1, 1897
  - Yamabe District (ja:山辺郡) - merged with Musha District to become Sanbu District on April 1, 1897
