= Kuniyoshi Station =

Railway station in Isumi, Chiba Prefecture, Japan

Kuniyoshi Station 国吉駅
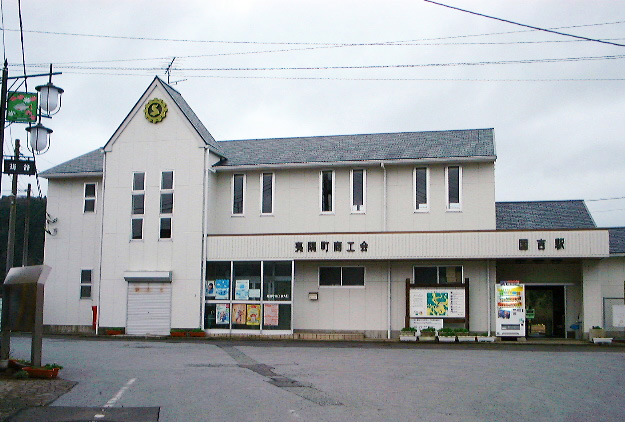
- Kuniyoshi Station in December 2002

General information
- Location: Kariya 537-2, Isumi-shi, Chiba-ken 298-0123; Japan
- Coordinates: 35.28052°N 140.314057°E
- Operator: Isumi Railway
- Line: ■ Isumi Line
- Distance: 8.8 km from Ōhara
- Platforms: 2 side platforms

Other information
- Status: Unstaffed

History
- Opened: April 1, 1930

Passengers
- FY2018: 132

Services
Preceding station	Isumi Railway	Following station
Shiromigaoka towards Ōtaki	Isumi Line Express	Kazusa-Azuma towards Ōhara
Kazusa-Nakagawa towards Kazusa-Nakano	Isumi Line Local	Nittano towards Ōhara
Location
- Location within Chiba Prefecture Location within Japan

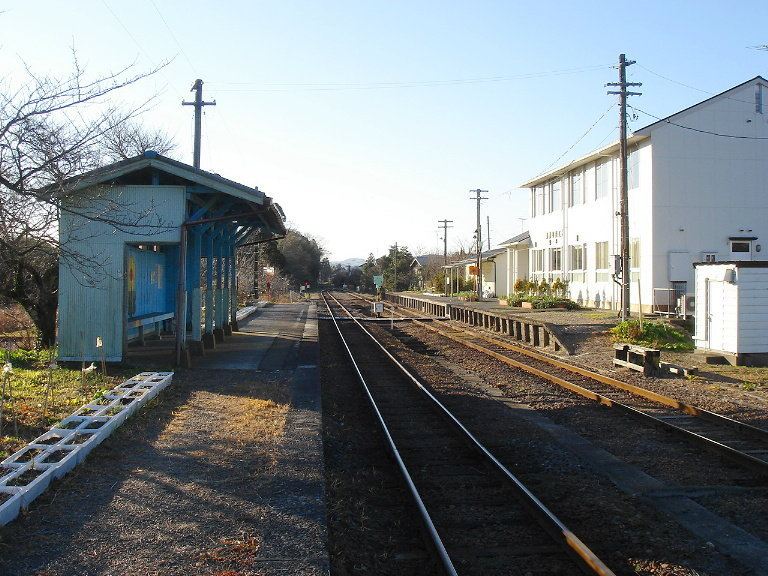
Kuniyoshi Station Platforms

Kuniyoshi Station (国吉駅, Kuniyoshi-eki) is a passenger railway station in the city of Isumi, Chiba Prefecture, Japan, operated by the third-sector railway operator Isumi Railway.

== Lines ==
Kuniyoshi Station is served by the Isumi Line, and lies 8.8 kilometers from the eastern terminus of the line at Ōhara.

== Station layout ==
Kuniyoshi Station has dual opposed side platforms serving two tracks. The station is unattended, although the station building houses a number of shops.

=== Platforms ===
1	■ Isumi Line	Ōhara
2	■ Isumi Line	Kazusa-Nakano

== History ==
Kuniyoshi Station opened on April 1, 1930, as a station on the Japanese Government Railway (JGR) Kihara Line. After World War II, the JGR became the Japanese National Railways (JNR). Scheduled freight operations were discontinued from October 1, 1974. With the division and privatization of the Japan National Railways on April 1, 1987, the station was acquired by the East Japan Railway Company. On March 24, 1988, the Kihara Line became the Isumi Railroad Isumi Line. In 2009, a new station building was completed.

== Passenger statistics ==
In fiscal 2018, the station was used by an average of 132 passengers daily.

== Surrounding area ==
- Isumi City Hall Isumi Branch (formerly the Isumi Town Hall)
- Isumi Municipal Kuniyoshi Elementary School
- Isumi Municipal Kuniyoshi Junior High School
- Chiba Prefectural School for the Physically and Mentally Handicapped
- National Route 465

== See also ==
- List of railway stations in Japan
