= Koyamatsu Station =

Railway station in Ōtaki, Chiba Prefecture, Japan

Coordinates: 35°16′7.5″N 140°15′5.0″E

Koyamatsu Station 小谷松駅
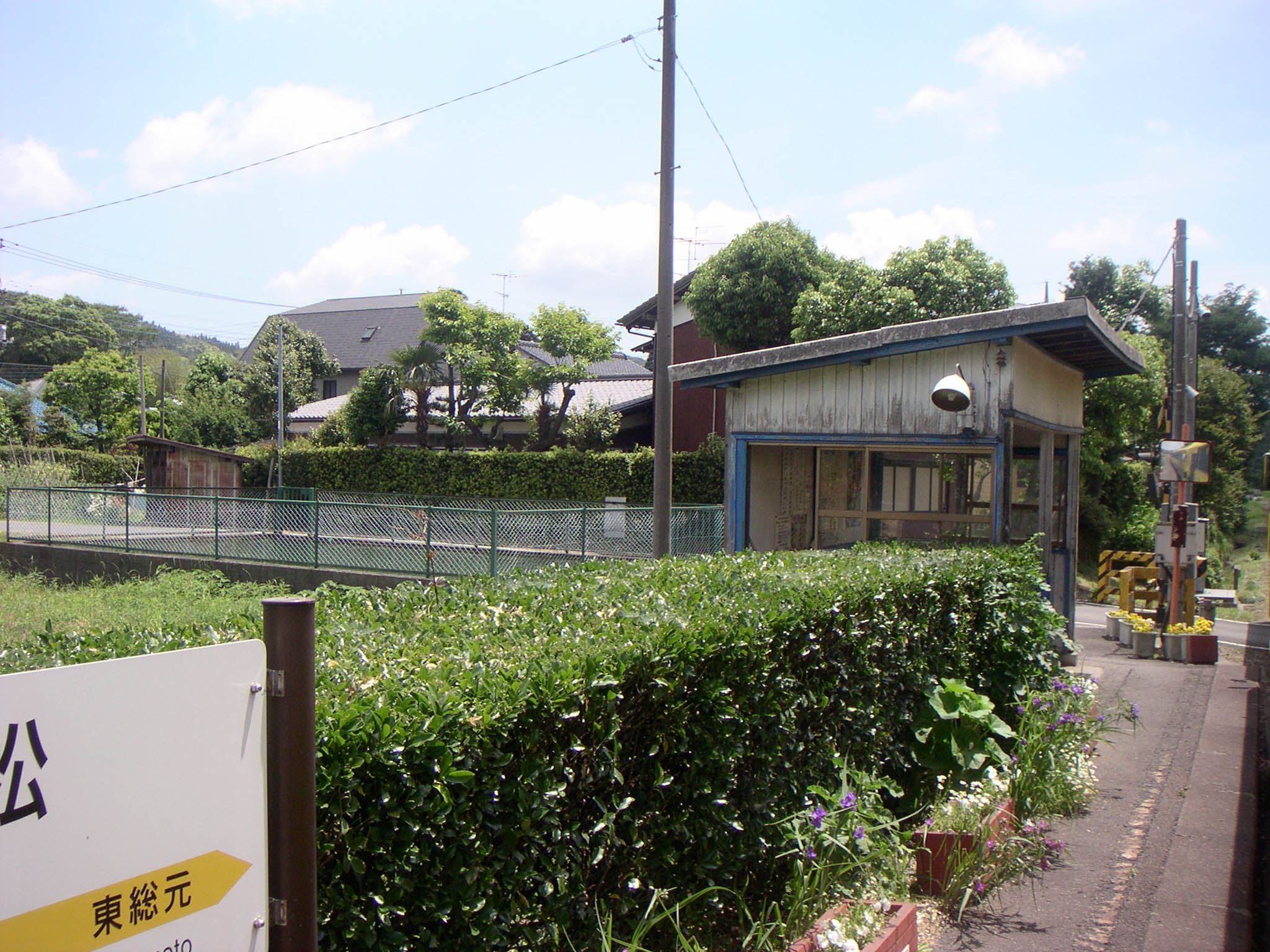

General information
- Location: Chiba-ken, Isumi-gun Ōtaki-machi Koyamatsu 283, Ōtaki, Isumi, Chiba （千葉県夷隅郡大多喜町小谷松283） Japan
- Operator: Isumi Railroad
- Line: Isumi Line

History
- Opened: 1960

Passengers
- 2009: 20 daily

Services
Preceding station	Isumi Railway	Following station
Higashi-Fusamoto towards Kazusa-Nakano	Isumi Line Local	Ōtaki towards Ōhara
Location

Koyamatsu Station (小谷松駅, Koyamatsu-eki) is a railway station operated by the Isumi Railway Company's Isumi Line, located in Isumi, Chiba Prefecture Japan. It is 18.2 kilometers from the eastern terminus of the Izumi Line at Ōhara Station.

== History ==
Koyamatsu Station opened on June 20, 1960 as a station on the Japanese National Railways (JNR). With the division and privatization of the Japan National Railways on April 1, 1987, the station was acquired by the East Japan Railway Company. On March 24, 1988, the Kihara Line became the Isumi Railroad Isumi Line.

== Lines ==
- Isumi Railway Company
  - Isumi Line

== Station layout ==
Koyamatsu Station has a simple side platform serving bidirectional traffic, with a three-sided rain shelter built onto the platform. The station is unstaffed.

=== Platforms ===
1	■ Isumi Line	Ōhara, Kazusa-Nakano

== Surroundings ==
- National Highway Route 465
