= Kazusa-Azuma Station =

Railway station in Chiba Prefecture, Japan

Kazusa-Azuma Station 上総東駅
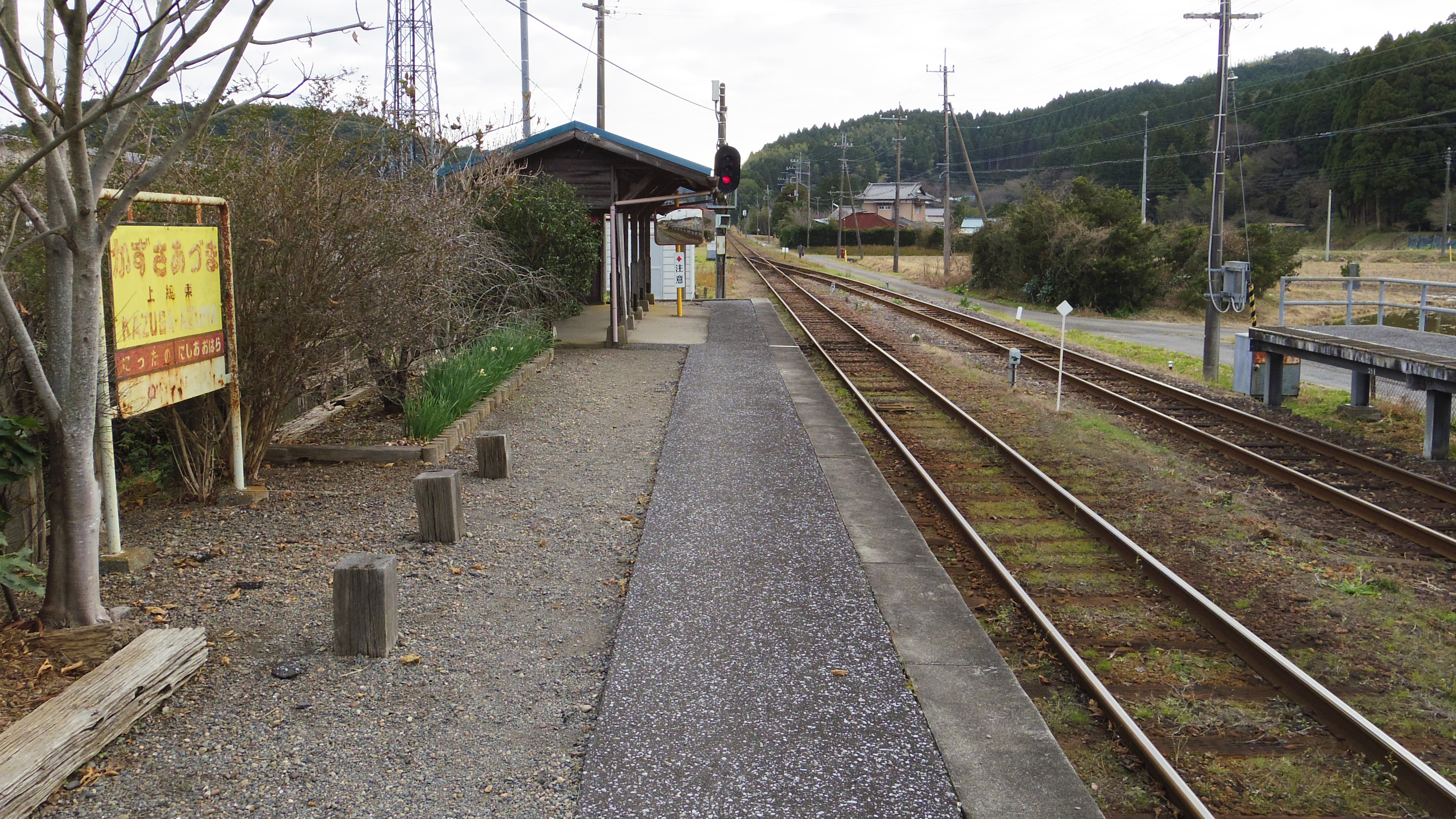
- Station platforms in December 2015

General information
- Location: Samuro 339, Isumi-shi, Chiba-ken 298-0022; Japan
- Coordinates: 35.263393°N 140.345032°E
- Operator: Isumi Railway
- Line: ■ Isumi Line
- Distance: 5.2 km from Ōhara
- Platforms: 2 side platforms

Other information
- Status: Unstaffed

History
- Opened: April 1, 1930

Passengers
- FY2018: 30

Services
| Preceding station | Isumi Railway | Following station |
|---|---|---|
| Kuniyoshi towards Ōtaki | Isumi Line Express | Ōhara Terminus |
| Nittano towards Kazusa-Nakano | Isumi Line Local | Nishi-Ōhara towards Ōhara |
Location
- Location within Chiba Prefecture Location within Japan

Kazusa-Azuma Station (上総東駅, Kazusa-Azuma-eki) is a passenger railway station in the city of Isumi, Chiba Prefecture, Japan, operated by the third-sector railway operator Isumi Railway.

== Lines ==
Kazusa-Azuma Station is served by the Isumi Line, and lies 5.2 kilometers from the eastern terminus of the line at Ōhara.

== Station layout ==
Kazusa-Azuma Station has dual opposed side platforms serving two tracks, with a three-sided rain shelter built onto each platform. The station is unattended.

=== Platforms ===
| 1 | ■ Isumi Line | Ōhara |
| 2 | ■ Isumi Line | Kazusa-Nakano |

== History ==
Kazusa-Azuma Station opened on April 1, 1930 as a station on the Japanese Government Railway (JGR) Kihara Line. After World War II, the JGR became the Japanese National Railways (JNR). The station has been unattended since 1954, when scheduled freight operations were also discontinued. With the division and privatization of the Japan National Railways on April 1, 1987, the station was acquired by the East Japan Railway Company. On March 24, 1988, the Kihara Line became the Isumi Railroad Isumi Line.

== Passenger statistics ==
In fiscal 2018, the station was used by an average of 30 passengers daily.

== Surrounding area ==
- The station is located in the central area of former Azuma Village
- Yamada Post Office
- National Route 465
- Isumi Municipal Azuma Elementary School
- Genji Hotaru no Sato

== See also ==
- List of railway stations in Japan
