= Kugahara Station =

Kugahara Station is the name of two train stations in Japan:

- Kugahara Station (Chiba) (久我原駅)
- Kugahara Station (Tokyo) (久が原駅)
