= Higashi-Fusamoto Station =

Railway station in Ōtaki, Chiba Prefecture, Japan

Higashi-Fusamoto Station 東総元駅
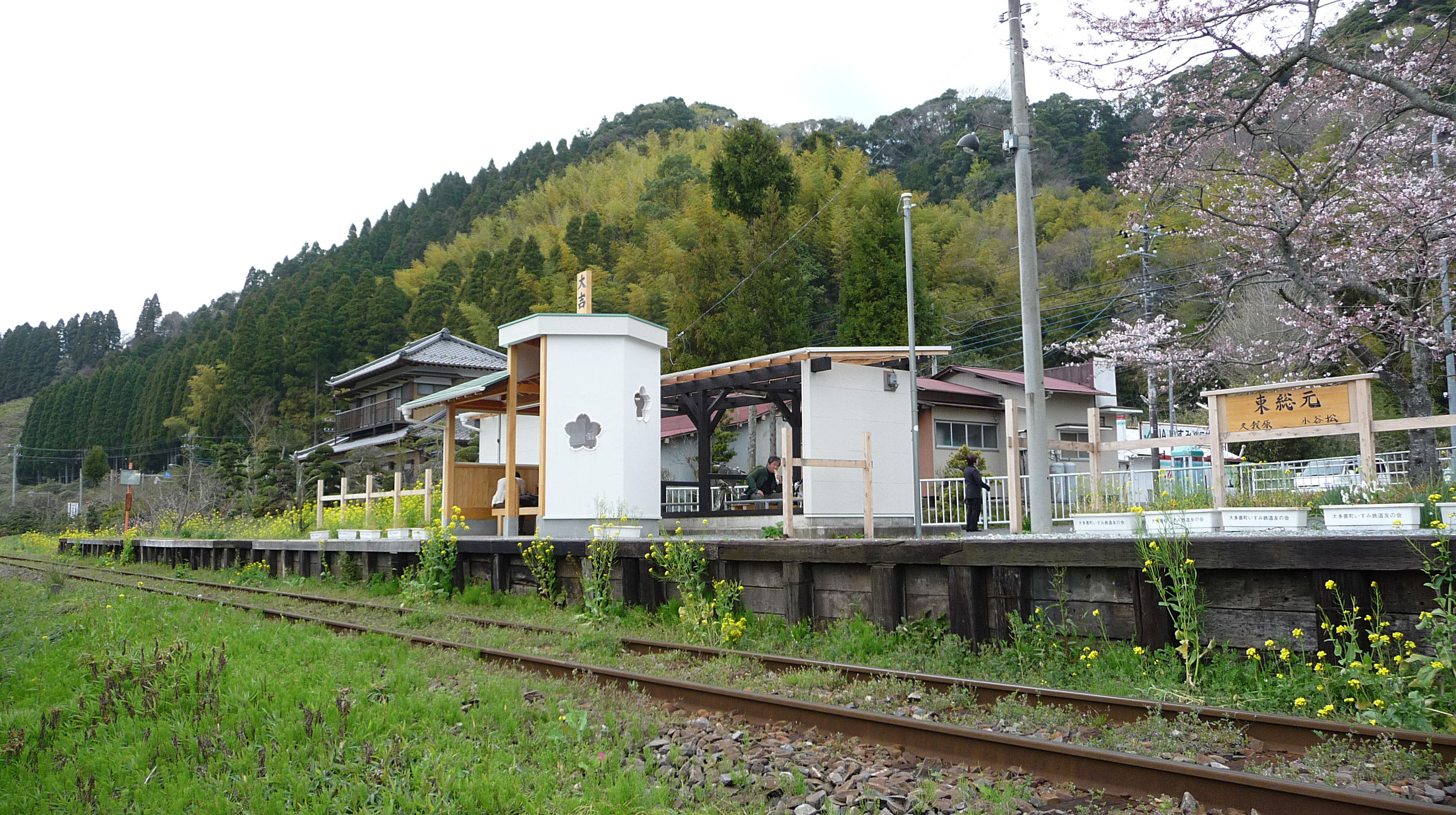
- Higashi-Fusamoto Station platform in April 2009

General information
- Location: Chiba-ken, Isumi-gun Ōtaki-machi Ōto 626, Ōtaki, Isumi, Chiba （千葉県夷隅郡大多喜町大戸626） Japan
- Coordinates: 35°15′33.8″N 140°14′51.4″E
- Operator: Isumi Railroad
- Line: Isumi Line

History
- Opened: 1937

Passengers
- 2009: 10 daily

Services
Preceding station	Isumi Railway	Following station
Kugahara towards Kazusa-Nakano	Isumi Line Local	Koyamatsu towards Ōhara
Location

Higashi-Fusamoto Station (東総元駅, Higashi-Fusamoto-eki) is a railway station on the Isumi Line operated by the Isumi Railway Company, located in Isumi, Chiba Prefecture, Japan.

== History ==
Higashi-Fusamoto Station was opened on February 1, 1937 as a station on the Japanese Government Railway (JGR) Kihara Line. Initially, only gasoline-powered locomotives serviced the station. The station was closed on June 10, 1945. It reopened on June 10, 1946 as a station on the Japanese National Railways (JNR). With the division and privatization of the Japan National Railways on April 1, 1987, the station was acquired by the East Japan Railway Company. On March 24, 1988, the Kihara Line became the Isumi Railroad Isumi Line. In 2008, the station building was completely rebuilt as a project by TV Tokyo for the popular TV documentary show "Champions".

== Lines ==
Higashi-Fusamoto Station is served by the Isumi Line and is 19.6 kilometers from the eastern terminus of the Izumi Line at Ōhara Station.

== Station layout ==
The station has a simple side platform serving bidirectional traffic, with a three-sided rain shelter built onto the platform. The station is unstaffed.

=== Platforms ===
1	■ Isumi Line	Ōhara, Kazusa-Nakano

== Surrounding area ==
- National Highway Route 465

== See also ==
- List of railway stations in Japan
