= Nittano Station =

Railway station in Isumi, Chiba Prefecture, Japan

Nittano Station 新田野駅
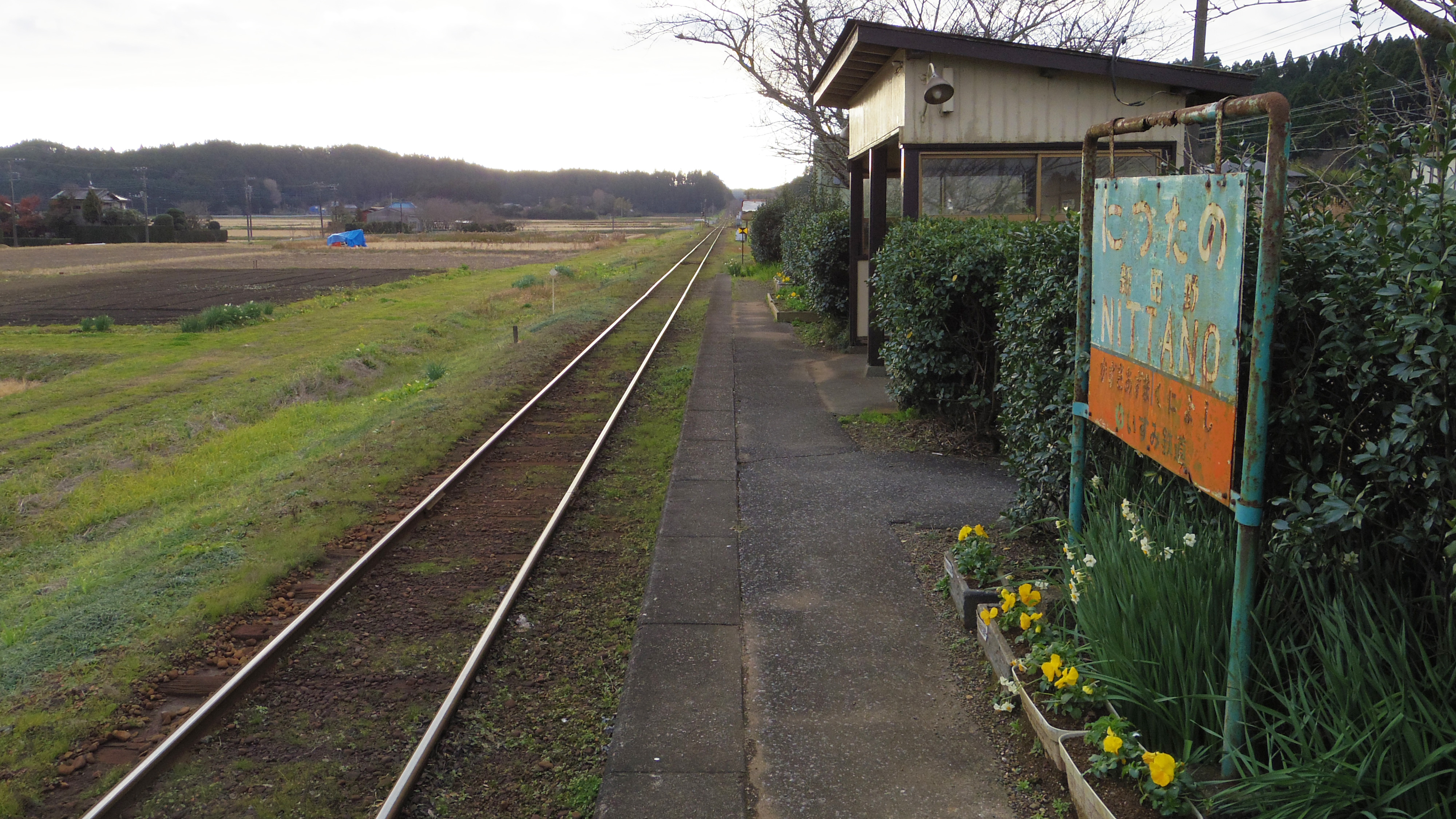
- The platform in December 2015

General information
- Location: Nittano 330, Isumi-shi, Chiba-ken 298-0026; Japan
- Coordinates: 35.276408°N 140.328092°E
- Operator: Isumi Railway
- Line: ■ Isumi Line
- Distance: 7.4 km from Ōhara
- Platforms: 1 side platform

Other information
- Status: Unstaffed

History
- Opened: June 20, 1960

Passengers
- FY2018: 17

Services
Preceding station	Isumi Railway	Following station
Kuniyoshi towards Kazusa-Nakano	Isumi Line Local	Kazusa-Azuma towards Ōhara
Location
- Location within Chiba Prefecture Location within Japan

Nittano Station (新田野駅, Nittano-eki) is a passenger railway station in the city of Isumi, Chiba Prefecture, Japan, operated by the third-sector railway operator Isumi Railway.

== Lines ==
Nittano Station is served by the Isumi Line, and lies 7.4 kilometers from the eastern terminus of the line at Ōhara.

== Station layout ==
The station consists of a simple side platform serving bidirectional traffic, with a three-sided rain shelter built onto the platform. The station is unattended.

=== Platforms ===
1	■ Isumi Line	Ōhara, Kazusa-Nakano

== History ==
Nittano Station opened on June 20, 1960 as a station on the Japanese National Railways (JNR). With the division and privatization of the Japan National Railways on April 1, 1987, the station was acquired by the East Japan Railway Company. On March 24, 1988, the Kihara Line became the Isumi Railroad Isumi Line.

== Passenger statistics ==
In fiscal 2018, the station was used by an average of 17 passengers daily.

== Surrounding area ==
- National Route 465

== See also ==
- List of railway stations in Japan
