= Nishihata Station =

Railway station in Ōtaki, Chiba Prefecture, Japan

Coordinates: 35°15′2.5″N 140°12′56″E

Nishihata Station 西畑駅
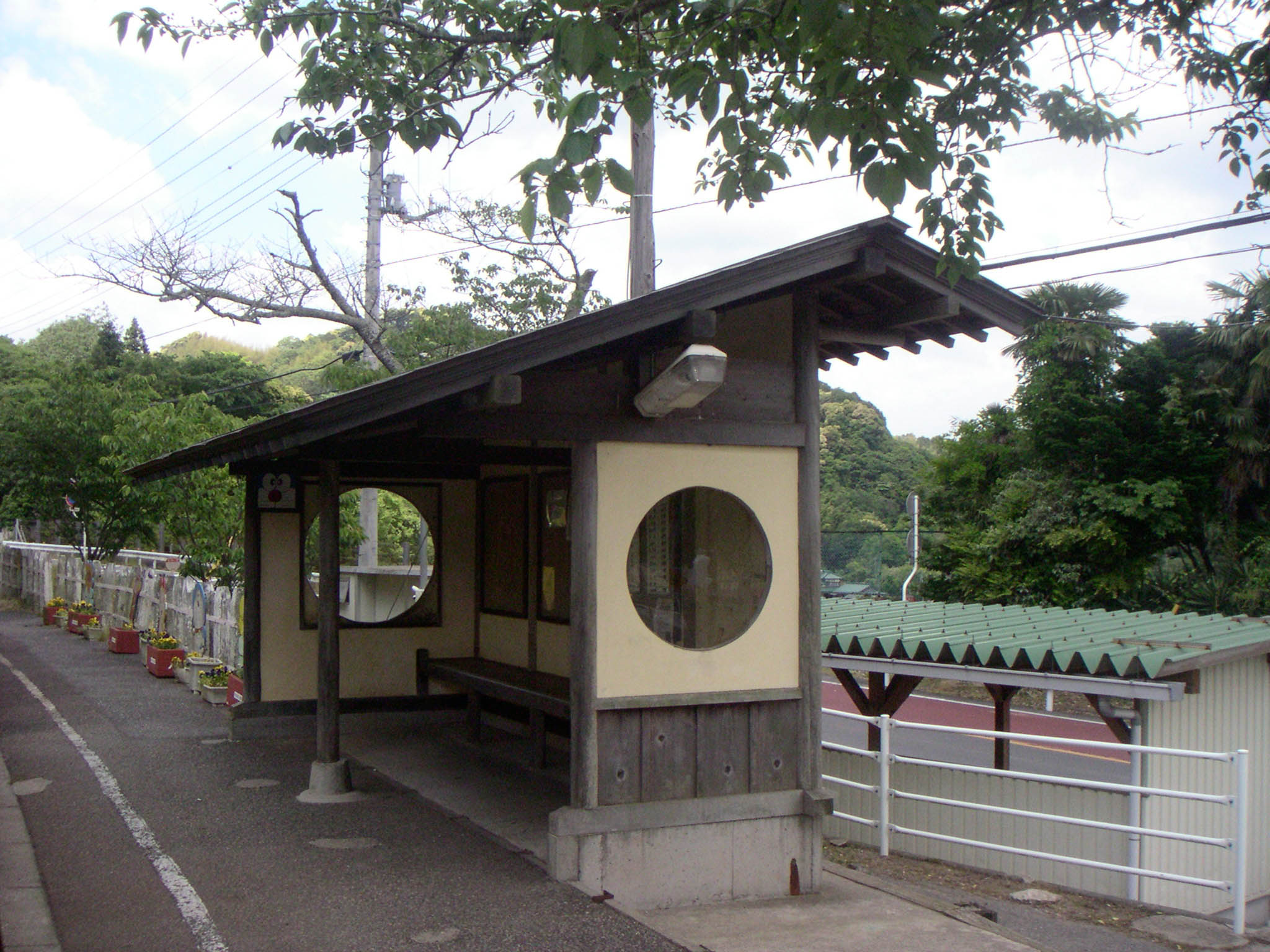

General information
- Location: Chiba-ken, Isumi-gun Ōtaki-machi Shōji 414-7, Ōtaki, Isumi, Chiba （千葉県夷隅郡大多喜町庄司414-7） Japan
- Operator: Isumi Railroad
- Line: Isumi Line

History
- Opened: 1937

Passengers
- 2009: 29 daily

Services
Preceding station	Isumi Railway	Following station
Kazusa-Nakano Terminus	Isumi Line Local	Fusamoto towards Ōhara
Location

Nishihata Station (西畑駅, Nishihata-eki) is a railway station operated by the Isumi Railway Company's Isumi Line, located in Ōtaki, Chiba Prefecture Japan. It is 25.1 kilometers from the eastern terminus of the Izumi Line at Ōhara Station.

== History ==
Nishihata Station was opened on February 1, 1937 as a station on the Japanese Government Railway (JGR) Kihara Line. Initially, only gasoline-powered locomotives serviced the station. The station was closed on June 10, 1945. It reopened on June 10, 1946 as a station on the Japanese National Railways (JNR). With the division and privatization of the Japan National Railways on April 1, 1987, the station was acquired by the East Japan Railway Company. On March 24, 1988, the Kihara Line became the Isumi Railroad Isumi Line.

== Lines ==
- Isumi Railway Company
  - Isumi Line

== Station layout ==
Nishihata Station has a simple side platform serving bidirectional traffic, with a three-sided rain shelter built onto the platform. The station is unstaffed.

=== Platforms ===
1	■ Isumi Line	Ōhara, Kazusa-Nakano

== Surroundings ==
- National Highway Route 465
