= Shiromigaoka Station =

Railway station in Ōtaki, Chiba Prefecture, Japan

Coordinates: 35°17′30″N 140°15′9.4″E

Shiromigaoka Station 城見ヶ丘駅
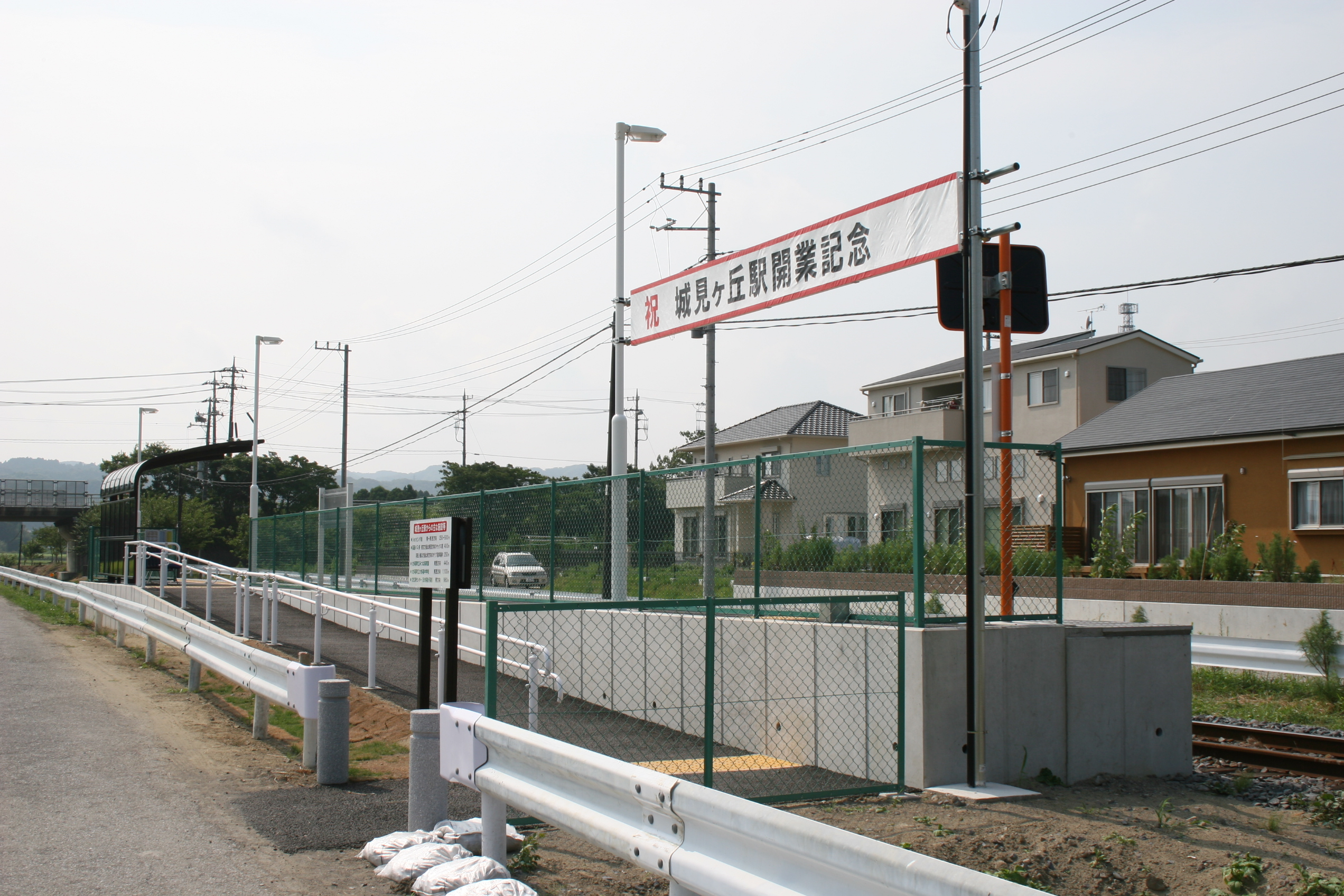

General information
- Location: Chiba-ken, Isumi-gun, Ōtaki-machi, Funako 681-2, Ōtaki, Isumi, Chiba （千葉県夷隅郡大多喜町船子681-3） Japan
- Operator: Isumi Railroad
- Line: Isumi Line

History
- Opened: 2008

Passengers
- 2008: 20 daily

Services
Preceding station	Isumi Railway	Following station
Ōtaki Terminus	Isumi Line Express	Kuniyoshi towards Ōhara
Ōtaki towards Kazusa-Nakano	Isumi Line Local	Kazusa-Nakagawa towards Ōhara
Location

Shiromigaoka Station (城見ヶ丘駅, Shiromigaoka-eki) is a railway station operated by the Isumi Railway Company's Isumi Line, located in Ōtaki, Chiba Prefecture Japan. It is 14.7 kilometers from the eastern terminus of the Izumi Line at Ōhara.

== History ==
Shiromigaoka Station opened on August 9, 2008 in conjunction with the developed of a large shopping center, the Ōtaki Shopping Plaza Olive, on National Route 297 on the outskirts of the town of Ōtaki. The station is only a five-minute walk from the shopping center.

== Lines ==
- Isumi Railway Company
  - Isumi Line

== Station layout ==
Shiromigaoka Station has a simple side platform serving bidirectional traffic, with a three-sided rain shelter built onto the platform.

=== Platforms ===
1	■ Isumi Line	Ōhara, Kazusa-Nakano
