= Kazusa-Nakagawa Station =

Railway station in Isumi, Chiba Prefecture, Japan

Kazusa-Nakagawa Station 上総中川駅
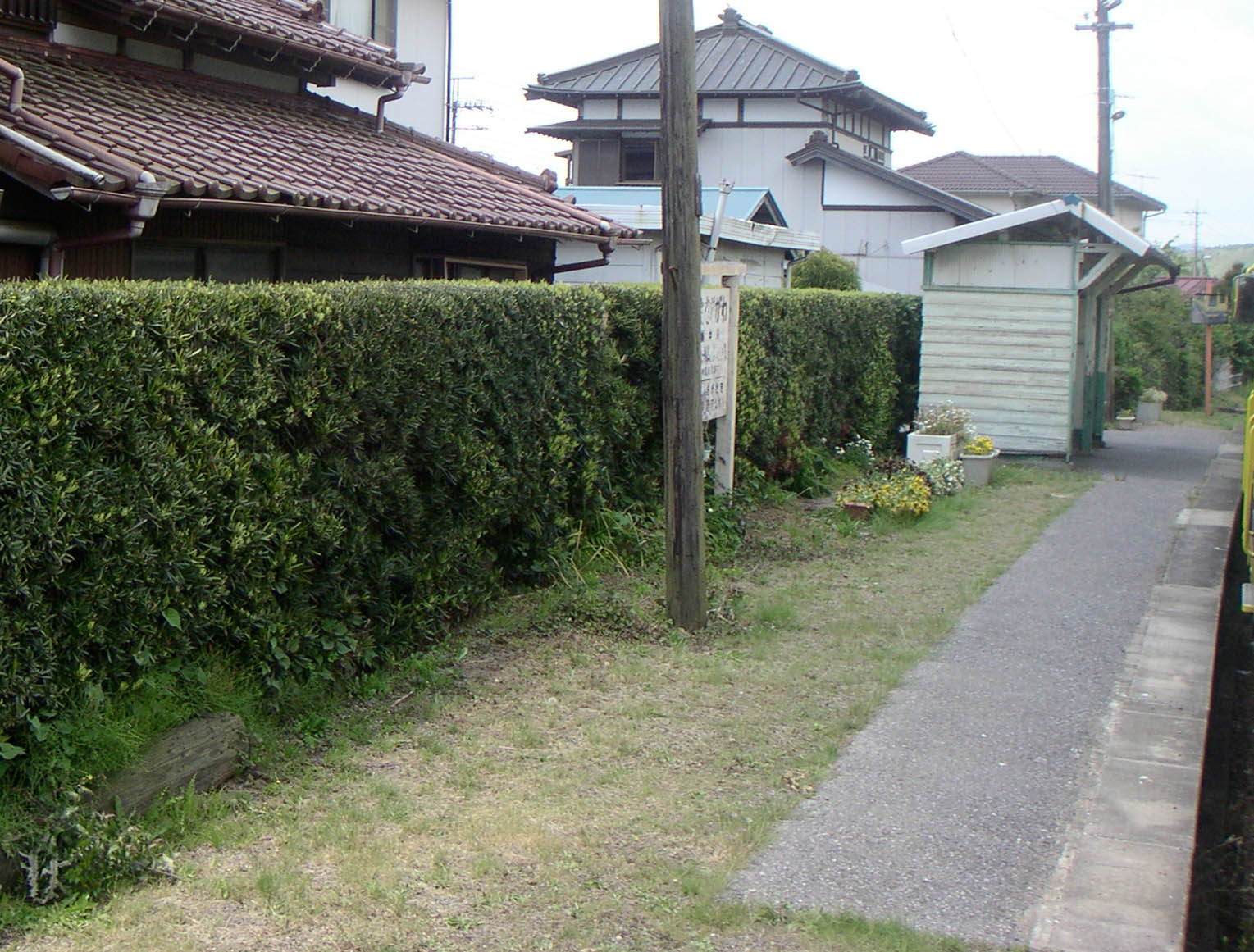
- Kazusa-Nakagawa Station, May 2005

General information
- Location: 705-1 Namegawa, Isumi-shi, Chiba-ken 298-0134; Japan
- Coordinates: 35°16′57.95″N 140°16′50.39″E
- Operator: Isumi Railway
- Line: ■ Isumi Line
- Distance: 11.9 km from Ōhara
- Platforms: 1 side platform

Other information
- Status: Unstaffed

History
- Opened: April 1, 1930

Passengers
- FY2018: 10

Services
Preceding station	Isumi Railway	Following station
Shiromigaoka towards Kazusa-Nakano	Isumi Line Local	Kuniyoshi towards Ōhara
Location
- Location within Chiba Prefecture Location within Japan

Kazusa-Nakagawa Station (上総中川駅, Kazusa-Nakagawa-eki) is a passenger railway station in the city of Isumi, Chiba Prefecture, Japan, operated by the third-sector railway operator Isumi Railway.

== Lines ==
Kazusa-Nakagawa Station is located 11.9 km from the eastern terminus of the Izumi Line at Ōhara.

== Station layout ==
The station consists of a simple side platform serving the bidirectional single line, with a three-sided rain shelter built onto the platform. The station is unattended.

== History ==
Kazusa-Nakagawa Station opened on April 1, 1930 as a station on the Japanese Government Railway (JGR) Kihara Line. After World War II, the JGR became the Japanese National Railways (JNR). Scheduled freight operations were discontinued from 1954, after which time the station has been unattended. With the division and privatization of the Japan National Railways on April 1, 1987, the station was acquired by the East Japan Railway Company. On March 24, 1988, the Kihara Line became the Isumi Line, operated by the Isumi Railway.

== Passenger statistics ==
In fiscal 2018, the station was used by an average of 10 passengers daily.

== Surrounding area ==
- Isumi City Multi-Purpose Hall
- Isumi Municipal Nakagawa Elementary School
- Isumi Municipal Nakagawa Kindergarten
- Nakagawa Police Station
- National Route 465
- Arakine Dam
- Poppo no Oka

== See also ==
- List of railway stations in Japan
