= Kugahara Station (Chiba) =

Railway station in Ōtaki, Chiba Prefecture, Japan

Coordinates: 35°15′01.02″N 140°14′51.70″E

Kugahara Station 久我原駅
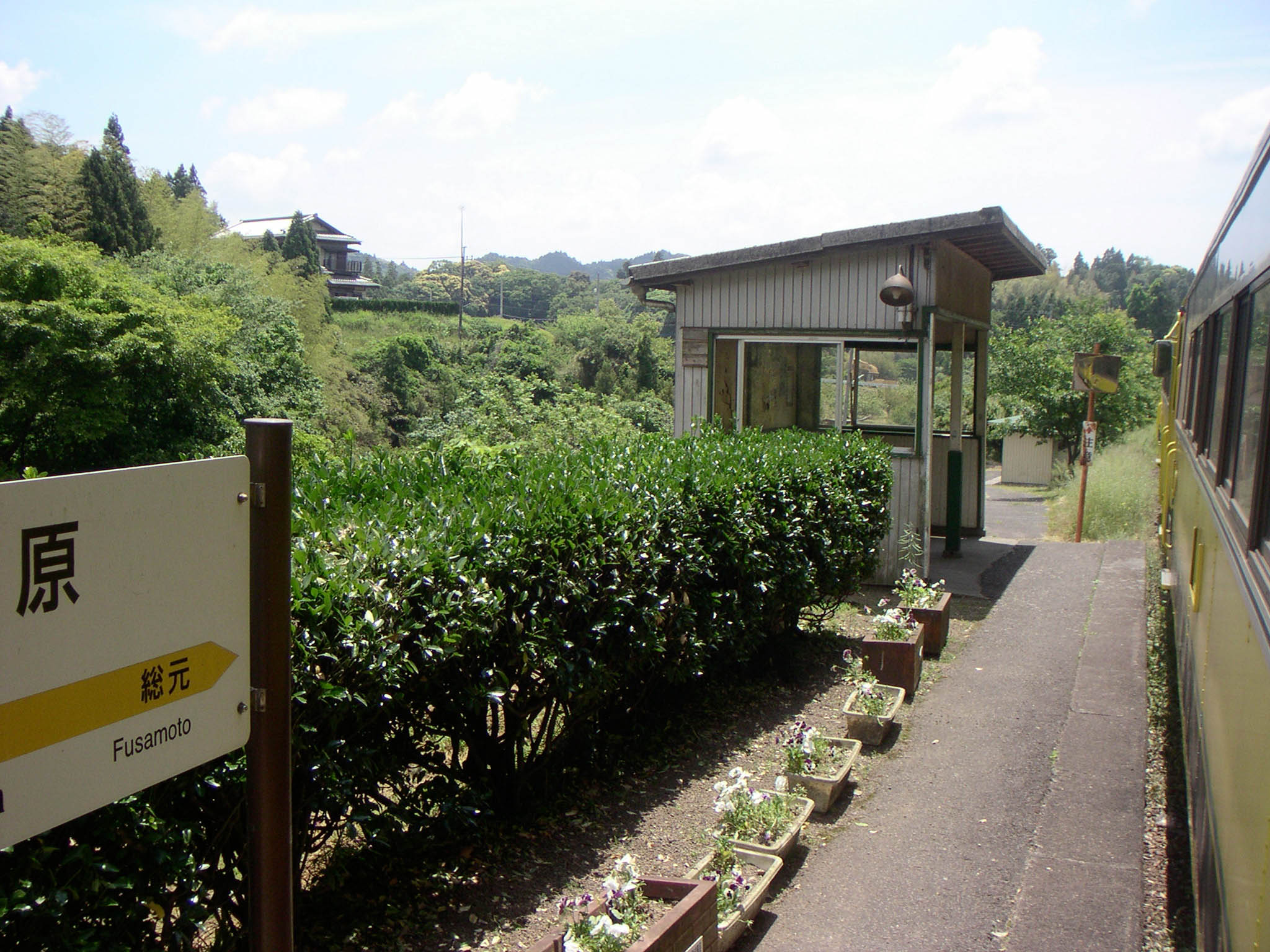
- Kugahara Station in May 2005

General information
- Location: 1026 Kugahara, Ōtaki, Isumi, Chiba （千葉県夷隅郡大多喜町久我原1026） Japan
- Operator: Isumi Railway
- Line: Isumi Line
- Connections

History
- Opened: 1960

Passengers
- FY2009: 19 daily

Services
Preceding station	Isumi Railway	Following station
Fusamoto towards Kazusa-Nakano	Isumi Line Local	Higashi-Fusamoto towards Ōhara
Location

Kugahara Station (久我原駅, Kugahara-eki) is a railway station on the Isumi Line in Isumi, Chiba Japan, operated by the third-sector railway operator Isumi Railway.

== Lines ==
Kugahara Station is served by the single-track Isumi Line, and lies 20.8 km from the eastern terminus of the line at Ōhara Station.

== Station layout ==
The station has a simple side platform serving a bidirectional single track, with a three-sided rain shelter built onto the platform. The station is unstaffed.

=== Platforms ===
1	■ Isumi Line	for Ōhara for Kazusa-Nakano

== History ==
Kugahara Station opened on June 20, 1960, as a station on the Japanese National Railways (JNR) Kihara Line. With the division and privatization of JNR on April 1, 1987, the station was acquired by East Japan Railway Company (JR East). On March 24, 1988, the Kihara Line became the Isumi Railway Isumi Line. Since July 1, 2009 the station has been nicknamed Saniku Gakuin Kugahara after the nearby Saniku Gakuin College, and the station signage was changed to reflect this.

== Surrounding area ==
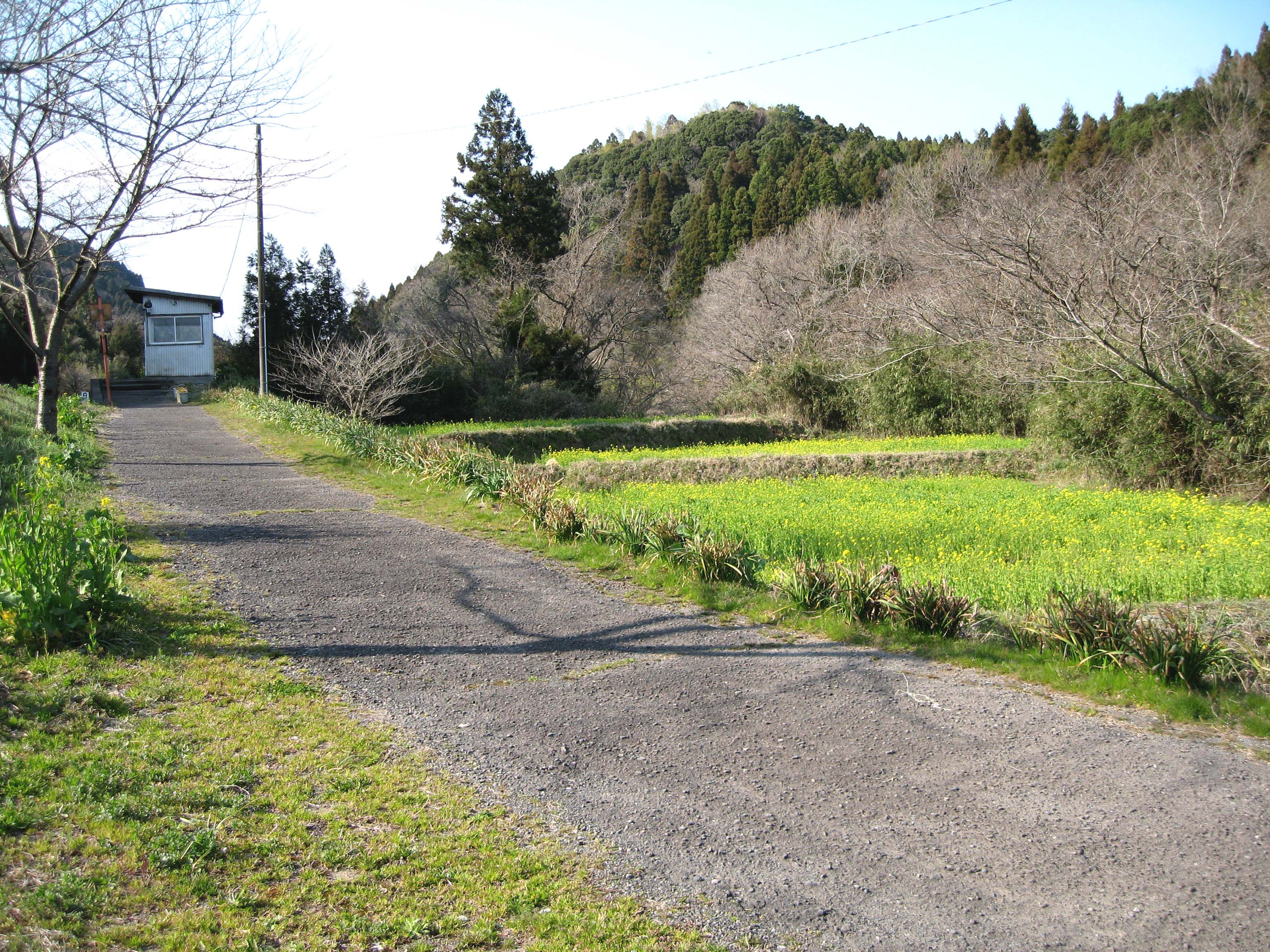
The narrow road leading up to the station

- Saniku Gakuin College
- National Route 297
- National Route 465

== See also ==
- Kugahara Station (Tokyo) in Tokyo
