= Fusamoto Station =

Railway station in Ōtaki, Chiba Prefecture, Japan

Coordinates: 35°14′26.2″N 140°14′26.7″E

Fusamoto Station 総元駅
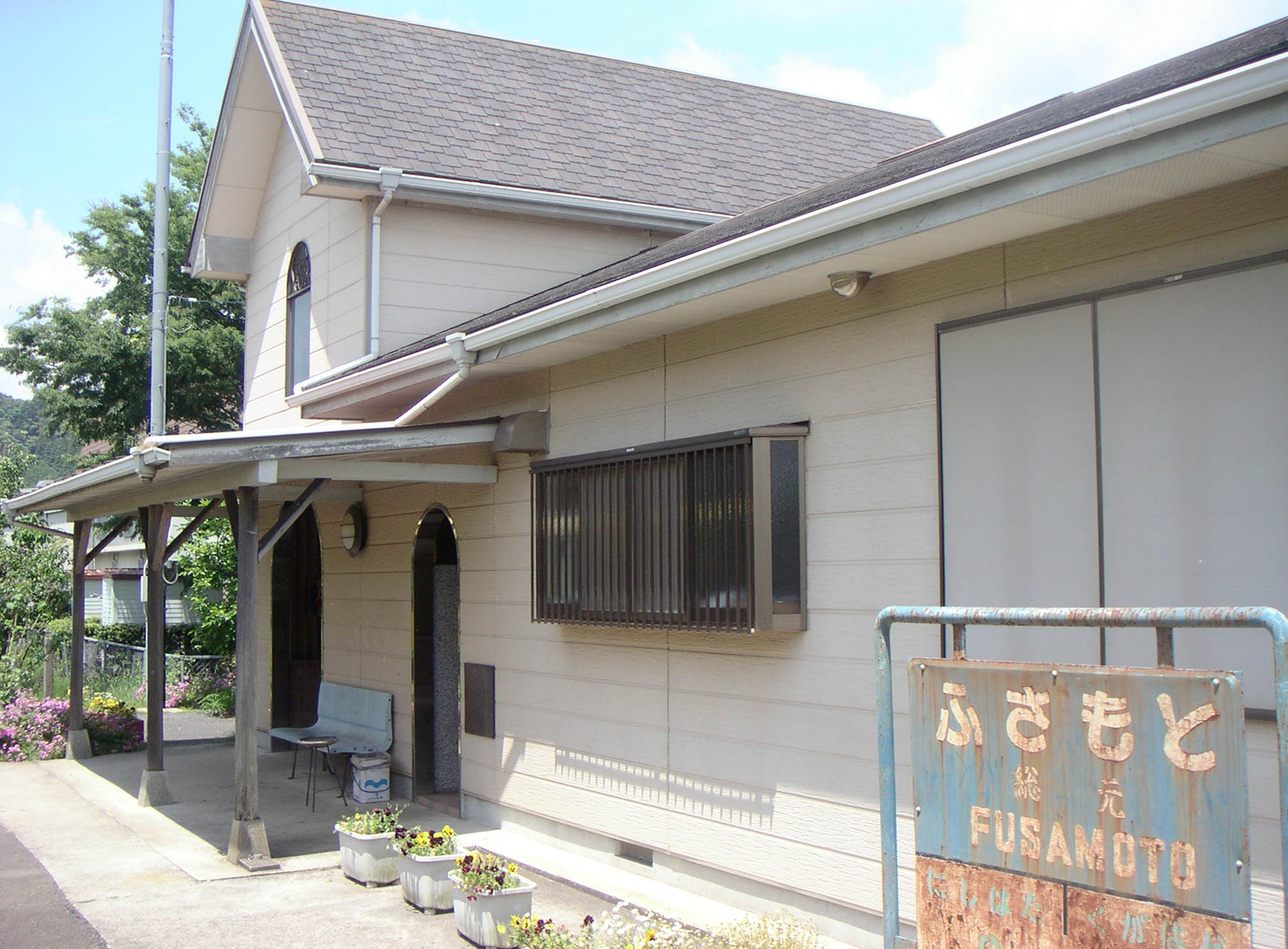

General information
- Location: Chiba-ken, Isumi-gun Ōtaki-machi Kurohara, Ōtaki, Isumi, Chiba （千葉県夷隅郡大多喜町黒原） Japan
- Operator: Isumi Railroad
- Line: Isumi Line

History
- Opened: 1937

Passengers
- 2009: 36 daily

Services
Preceding station	Isumi Railway	Following station
Nishihata towards Kazusa-Nakano	Isumi Line Local	Kugahara towards Ōhara
Location

Fusamoto Station (総元駅, Fusamoto-eki) is a railway station operated by the Isumi Railway Company's Isumi Line, located in Isumi, Chiba Prefecture Japan. It is 22.2 kilometers from the eastern terminus of the Izumi Line at Ōhara Station.

== History ==
Fusamoto Station was opened on February 1, 1937 as the terminal station of the Japanese Government Railway (JGR) Kihara Line. The line was extended to its present terminus at Kazusa-Nakano on August 26, 1934. Scheduled freight services were discontinued from September 1969 and the station has been unattended since May 10, 1974. With the division and privatization of the Japan National Railways (JNR) on April 1, 1987, the station was acquired by the East Japan Railway Company. On March 24, 1988, the Kihara Line became the Isumi Railroad Isumi Line. In 1992, the station building was completely rebuilt.

== Lines ==
- Isumi Railway Company
  - Isumi Line

== Station layout ==
Fusamoto Station has a simple side platform serving bidirectional traffic. The station is unstaffed.

=== Platforms ===
1	■ Isumi Line	Ōhara, Kazusa-Nakano

== Surroundings ==
- National Highway Route 465
