= KiHa 01 series =

Japanese train type

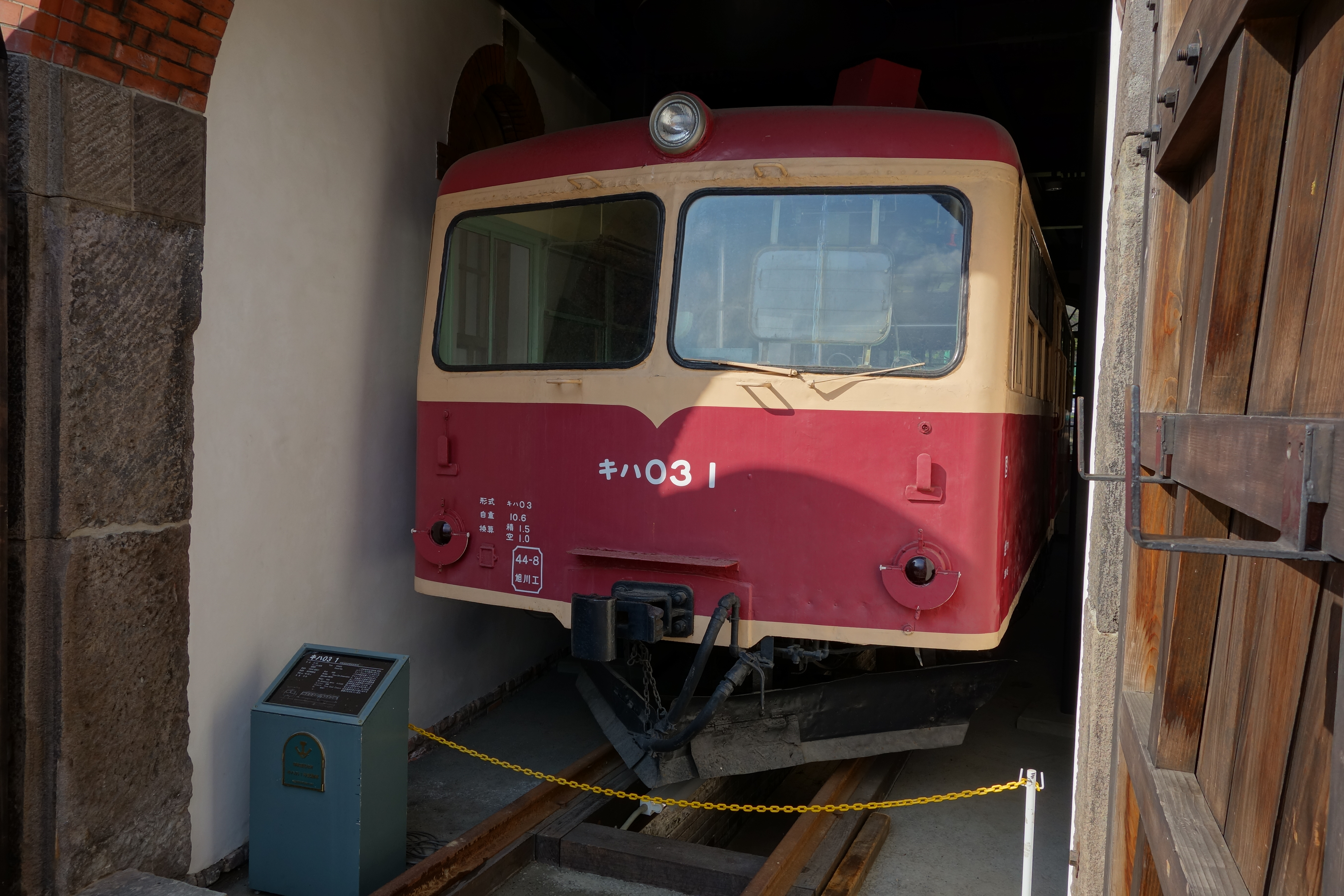
- KiHa 03-1 at the Otaru Museum in May 2014
- Constructed: 1954–1956
- Number built: 49 vehicles
- Number in service: None
- Number preserved: 1 vehicle
- Formation: Single car
- Operators: JNR (1954–1969)
- Lines served: Various

Specifications
- Car length: 10 m (32 ft 10 in)
- Doors: 1 per side (KiHa 03 cars); 2 per side (KiHa 01 cars)
- Prime mover(s): Hino DS21
- Track gauge: 1,067 mm (3 ft 6 in)

The KiHa 01 series (キハ01系, Kiha-ichi-kei) and the related KiHa 02 (キハ02) and KiHa 03 (キハ03) were railbus types operated by Japanese National Railways (JNR) from 1954 until 1969.

== History ==
A total of 49 vehicles were built between 1954 and 1956, originally classified as KiHa 10000 (キハ10000形). Four prototypes entered service on the Kihara Line (present day Isumi Railway Isumi Line) in 1954. In 1957, the KiHa 10000 were reclassified as KiHa 01 and 02, the KiHa 10200 were reclassified as KiHa 03.

The last unit, KiHa 02 10, was withdrawn in 1969.

== Preserved examples ==
- KiHa 03-1: Preserved at the Otaru Museum
- KiHa 02-9: Preserved at the ruins of the Hizen-Ikeno Station as a children's library, scrapped in 1983 however due to massive vandalism.
