= Nishi-Ōhara Station =

Railway station in Isumi, Chiba Prefecture, Japan

Nishi-Ōhara Station 西大原駅
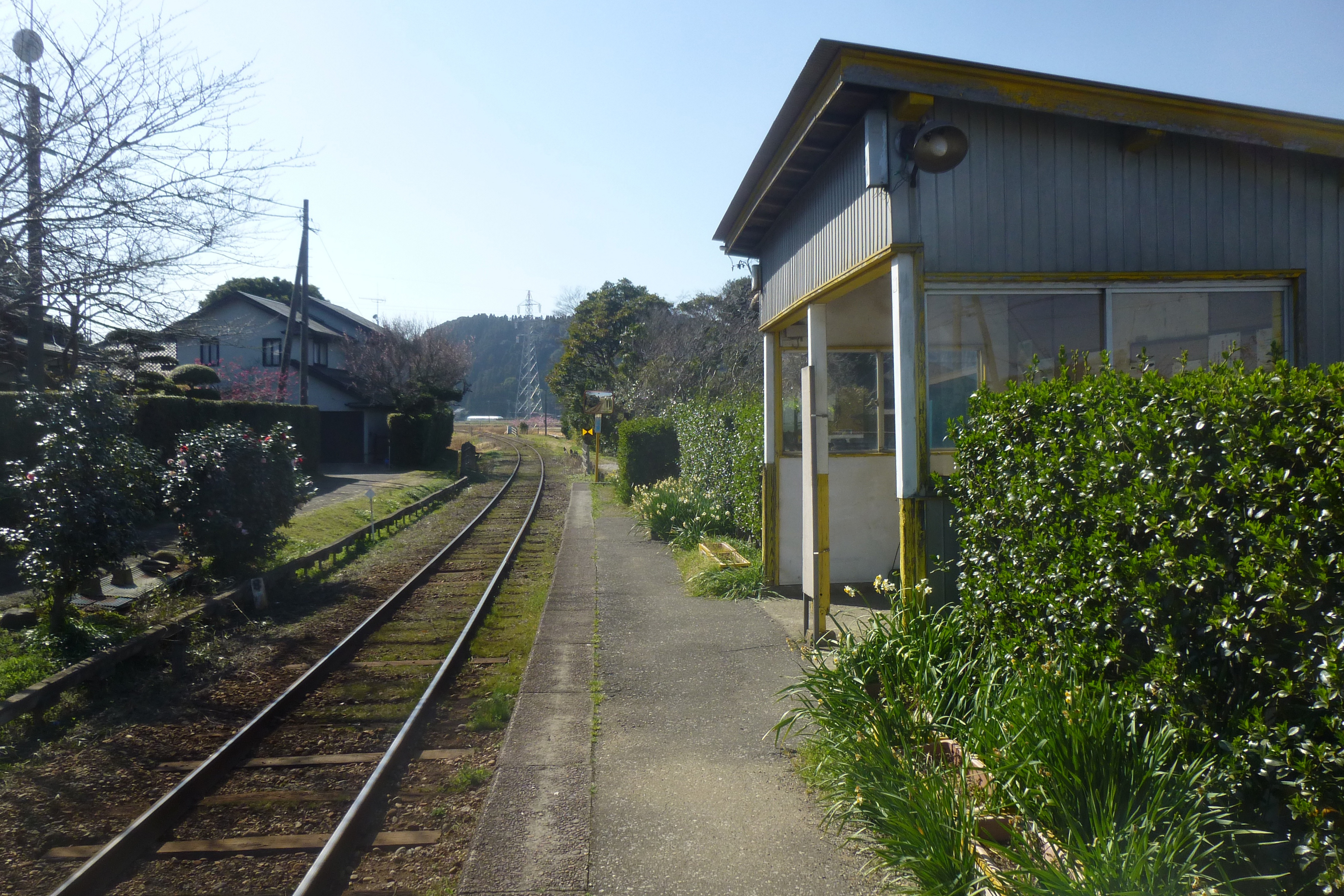
- Nishi-Ōhara Station in March 2013

General information
- Location: 3559 Nitta, Isumi-shi, Chiba-ken 298-0005; Japan
- Coordinates: 35°15′37.84″N 140°22′40.39″E
- Operator: Isumi Railway
- Line: ■ Isumi Line
- Distance: 1.7 km from Ōhara
- Platforms: 1 side platform

Other information
- Status: Unstaffed
- Website: Official website

History
- Opened: June 20, 1960

Passengers
- FY2018: 13

Services
| Preceding station | Isumi Railway | Following station |
|---|---|---|
| Kazusa-Azuma towards Kazusa-Nakano | Isumi Line Local | Ōhara Terminus |
Location
- Location within Chiba Prefecture Location within Japan

Nishi-Ōhara Station (西大原駅, Nishi-Ōhara-eki) is a passenger railway station in the city of Isumi, Chiba Prefecture, Japan, operated by the third-sector railway operator Isumi Railway.

== Lines ==
Nishi-Ōhara Station is served by the Isumi Line, and lies 1.7 kilometers from the eastern terminus of the line at Ōhara.

== Station layout ==
The station consists of a simple side platform serving a bidirectional single-track line, with a three-sided rain shelter built onto the platform. The station is unattended.

=== Platforms ===
| 1 | ■ Isumi Line | for Ōhara and Kazusa-Nakano |

== History ==
Nishi-Ōhara Station opened on June 20, 1960, as a station on the Japanese National Railways (JNR) Kihara Line. With the division and privatization of JNR on April 1, 1987, the station came under control of East Japan Railway Company (JR East). On March 24, 1988, operation of the Kihara Line was transferred to the third-sector railway operator Isumi Railway, with the line renamed the Isumi Line.

== Passenger statistics ==
In fiscal 2018, the station was used by an average of 13 passengers daily.

== Surrounding area ==
- Isumi Municipal Tōkai Elementary School
- National Route 465

== See also ==
- List of railway stations in Japan
