= Isumi Line =

Railway line in Chiba prefecture, Japan

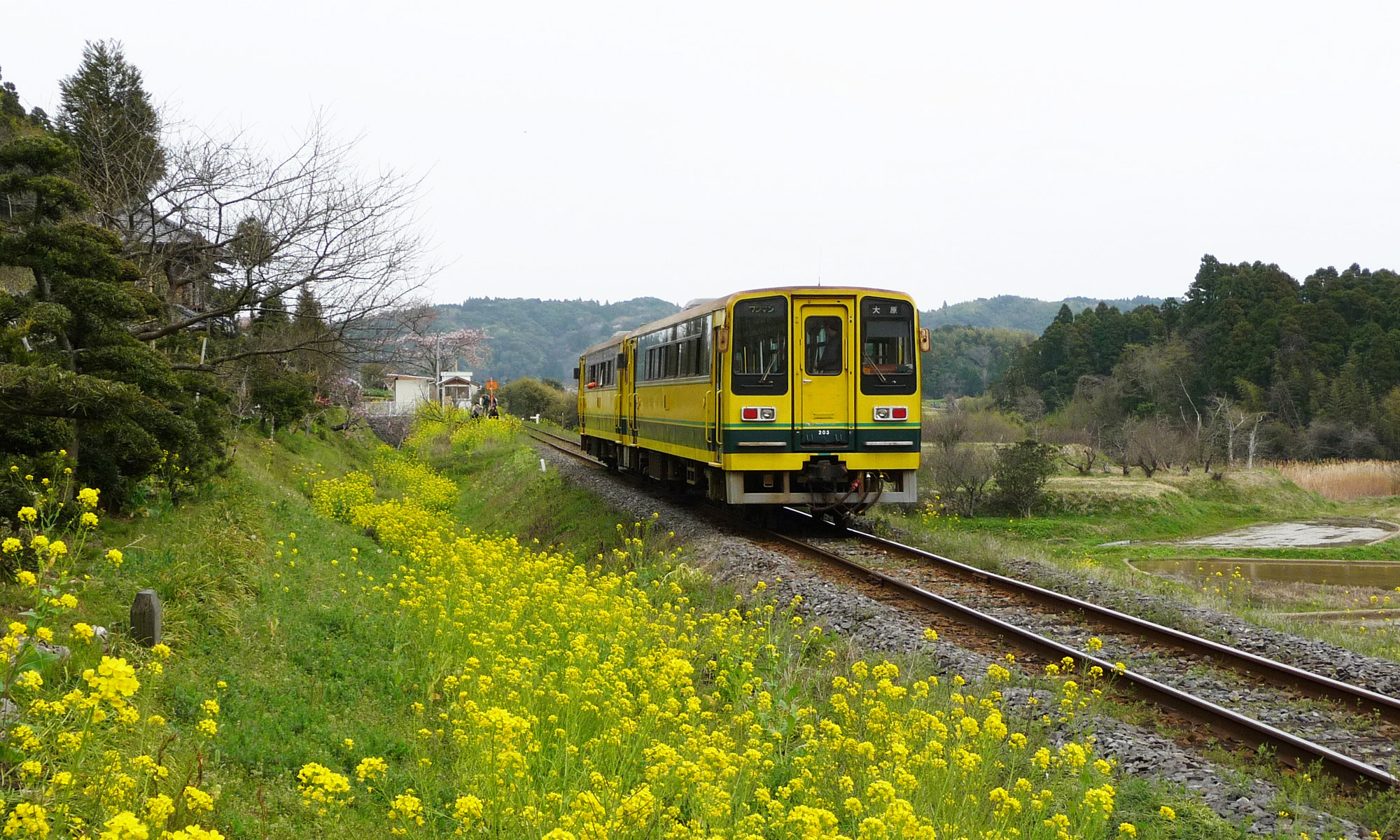
- An Isumi Class 200 diesel car near Higashi-Fusamoto Station in April 2009

Overview
- Native name: いすみ線
- Status: In operation
- Owner: Isumi Railway Company
- Locale: Chiba Prefecture
- Termini: Ōhara; Kazusa-Nakano
- Stations: 14

Service
- Operator: Isumi Railway Company
- Depot: Ōtaki
- Rolling stock: Isumi 200 series DMU, Isumi 300 series DMU, Isumi 350 series DMU, KiHa 52 series DMU, KiHa 28 series DMU

History
- Opened: 1930

Technical
- Line length: 26.8 km (16.7 mi)
- Number of tracks: Entire line single tracked
- Character: Rural
- Track gauge: 1,067 mm (3 ft 6 in)
- Minimum radius: 200 m
- Electrification: None
- Operating speed: 65 km/h (40 mph)

The Isumi Line (いすみ線, Isumi-sen) is a railway line in Chiba Prefecture, Japan, operated by the third-sector railway operating company Isumi Railway Company. It extends through the central eastern section of the Bōsō Peninsula, linking Ōhara Station in the city of Isumi, where it connects with the Sotobō Line, to Kazusa-Nakano Station in the town of Ōtaki, where it connects with the Kominato Line.

The Isumi Line has been suspended since October 2024 due to a derailment accident between Kuniyoshi Station and Kazusa-Nakagawa Station. Service on the line is expected to resume around autumn 2027.

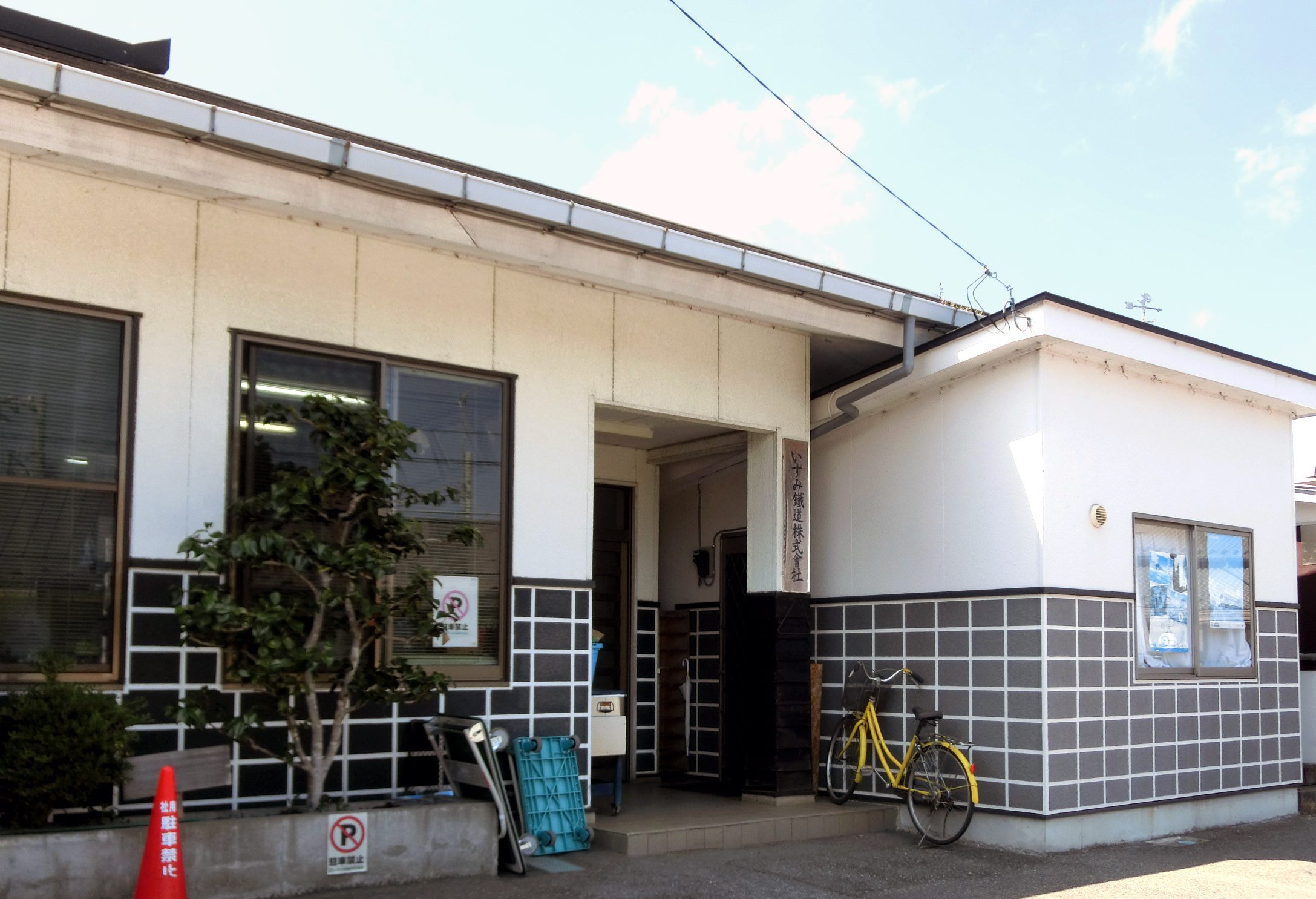
The head office next to Otaki Station

== Station list ==
- The Isumi Line only operates Local services on weekdays.
- The Holiday Express runs only on holidays. This train service requires the additional purchase of an Express Ticket, in addition to fares. The Express Service begins and ends at Ōtaki or Kazusa-Nakano. The train between Ōtaki Station and Kazusa-Nakano Station can be boarded without an Express Ticket as the Holiday Express runs parallel to the Local service in this section of the route.
- Stations marked "●" are served by all Express services.

Station name	Japanese	Distance (km)	Express	Transfers	Location
Ōhara	大原	0.0	●	Sotobō Line	Isumi
Nishi-Ōhara	西大原	1.7	↕		Isumi
Kazusa-Azuma	上総東	5.2	●		Isumi
Nittano	新田野	7.4	↕		Isumi
Kuniyoshi	国吉	8.8	●		Isumi
Kazusa-Nakagawa	上総中川	11.9	↕		Isumi
Shiromigaoka	城見ヶ丘	14.7	●		Ōtaki; Isumi District
Ōtaki	大多喜	15.8	●		Ōtaki; Isumi District
Koyamatsu	小谷松	18.2			Ōtaki; Isumi District
Higashi-Fusamoto	東総元	19.6			Ōtaki; Isumi District
Kugahara	久我原	20.8			Ōtaki; Isumi District
Fusamoto	総元	22.2			Ōtaki; Isumi District
Nishihata	西畑	25.1			Ōtaki; Isumi District
Kazusa-Nakano	上総中野	26.8		Kominato Line	Ōtaki; Isumi District

== Rolling stock ==
(video) The outside and inside of an Isumi Class 300 train in March 2013

- Isumi Class 200 single-car DMUs
- Isumi Class 300 single-car DMUs, numbers 301 to 302 (since March 2012)
- Isumi Class 350 single-car DMU, number 351 (since 2013)
- KiHa 28 DMU car KiHa 28 2346 (from JR West)
- KiHa 30 DMU car Kiha 30 62 (from JR East)
- KiHa 52 DMU car KiHa 52-125 (from JR West)
- KiHa 20 single-car DMU, number KiHa 20 1303, since September 2015
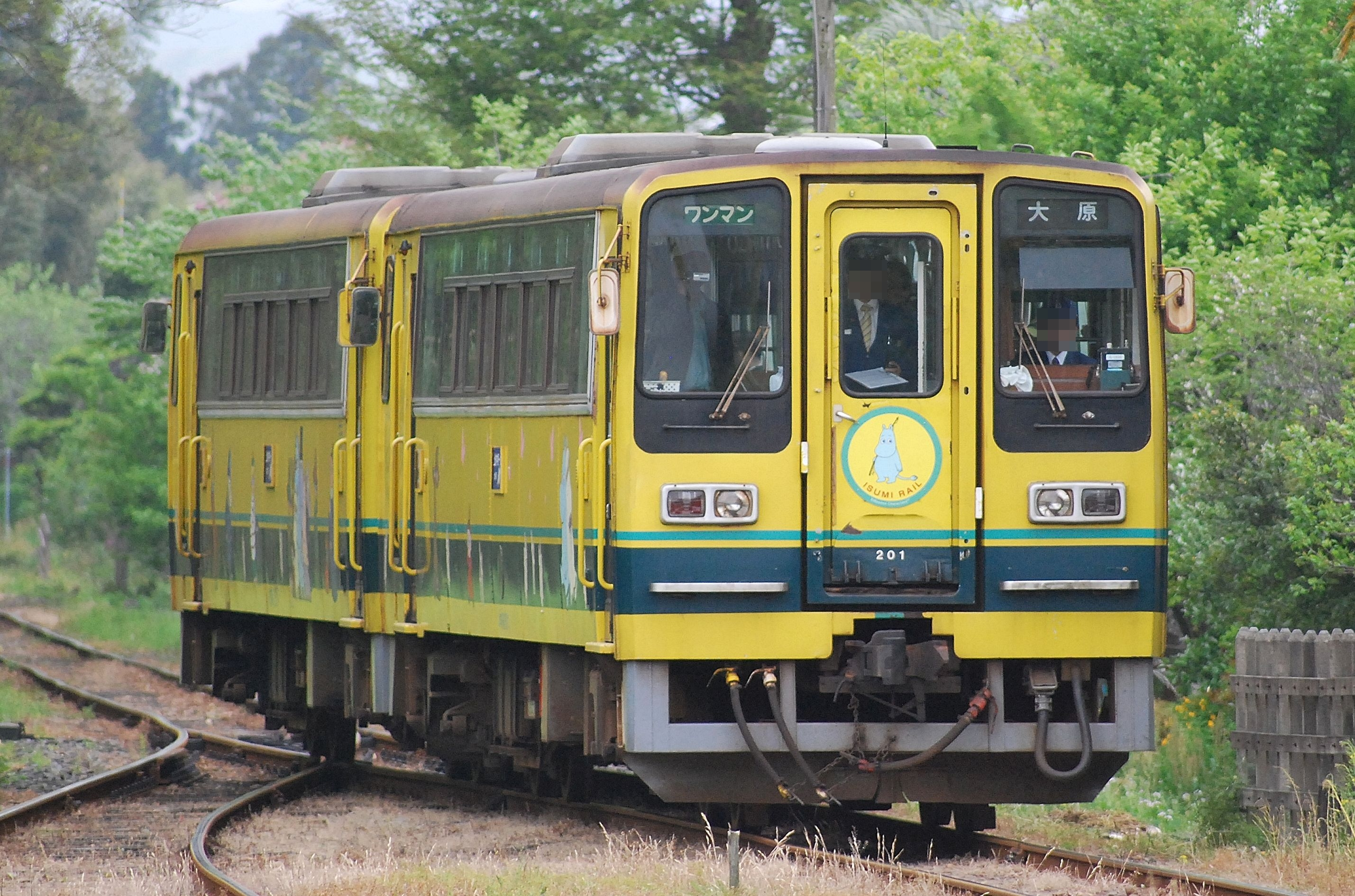
Isumi Class 200 DMU cars in May 2011

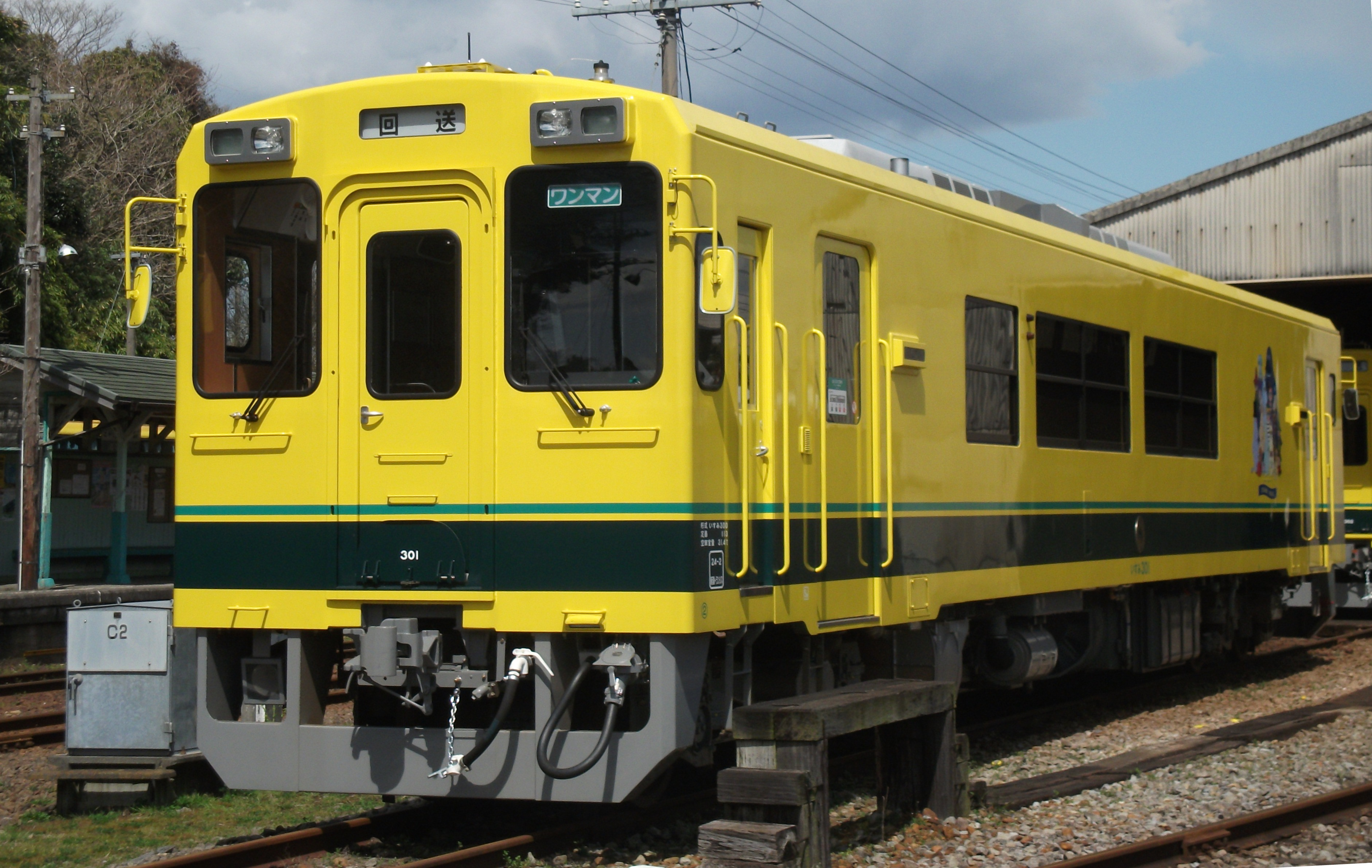
Isumi Class 300 DMU car 301 in March 2012

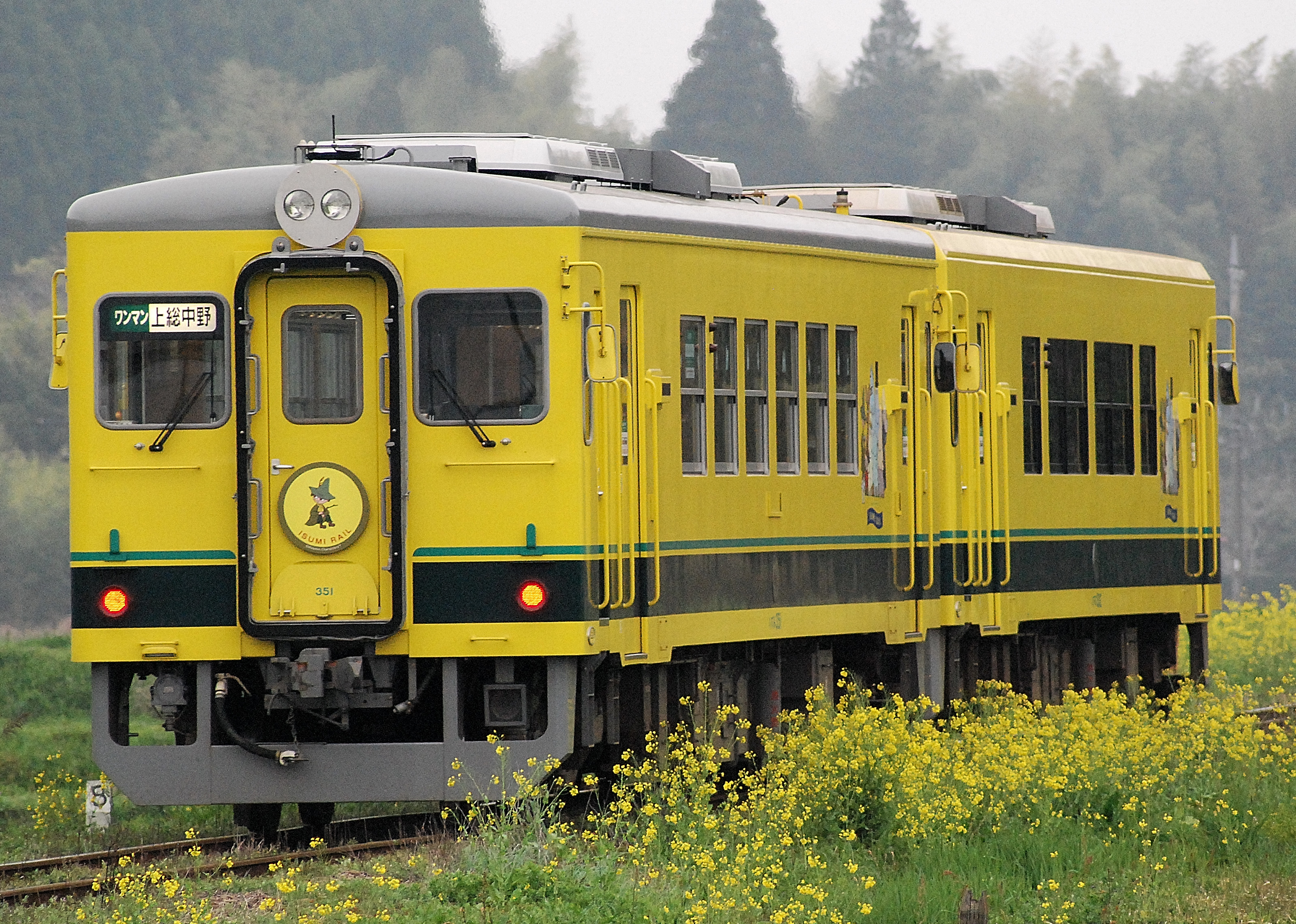
Isumi Class 350 DMU car 351 in March 2013

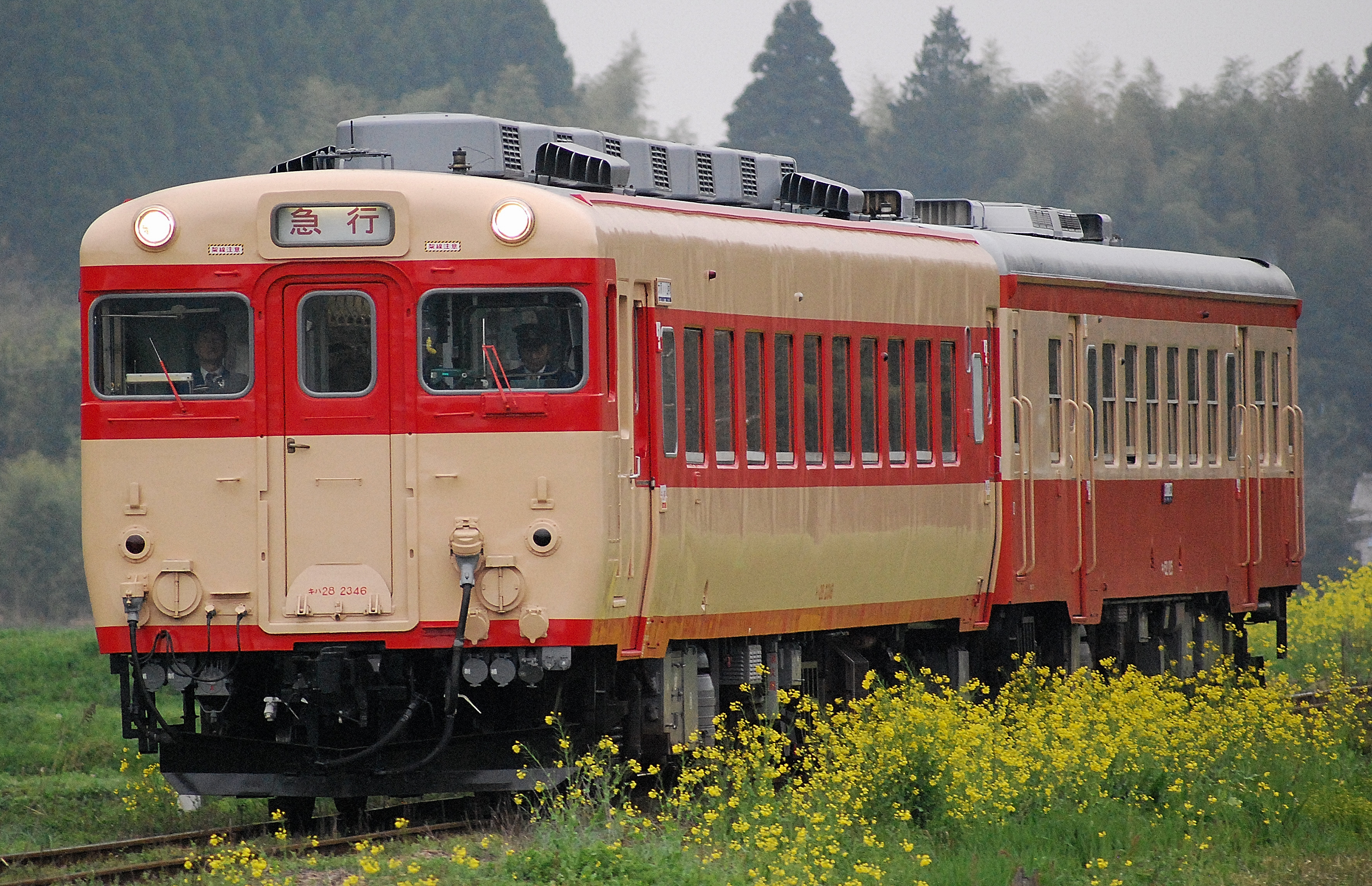
KiHa 28 2346 in March 2013

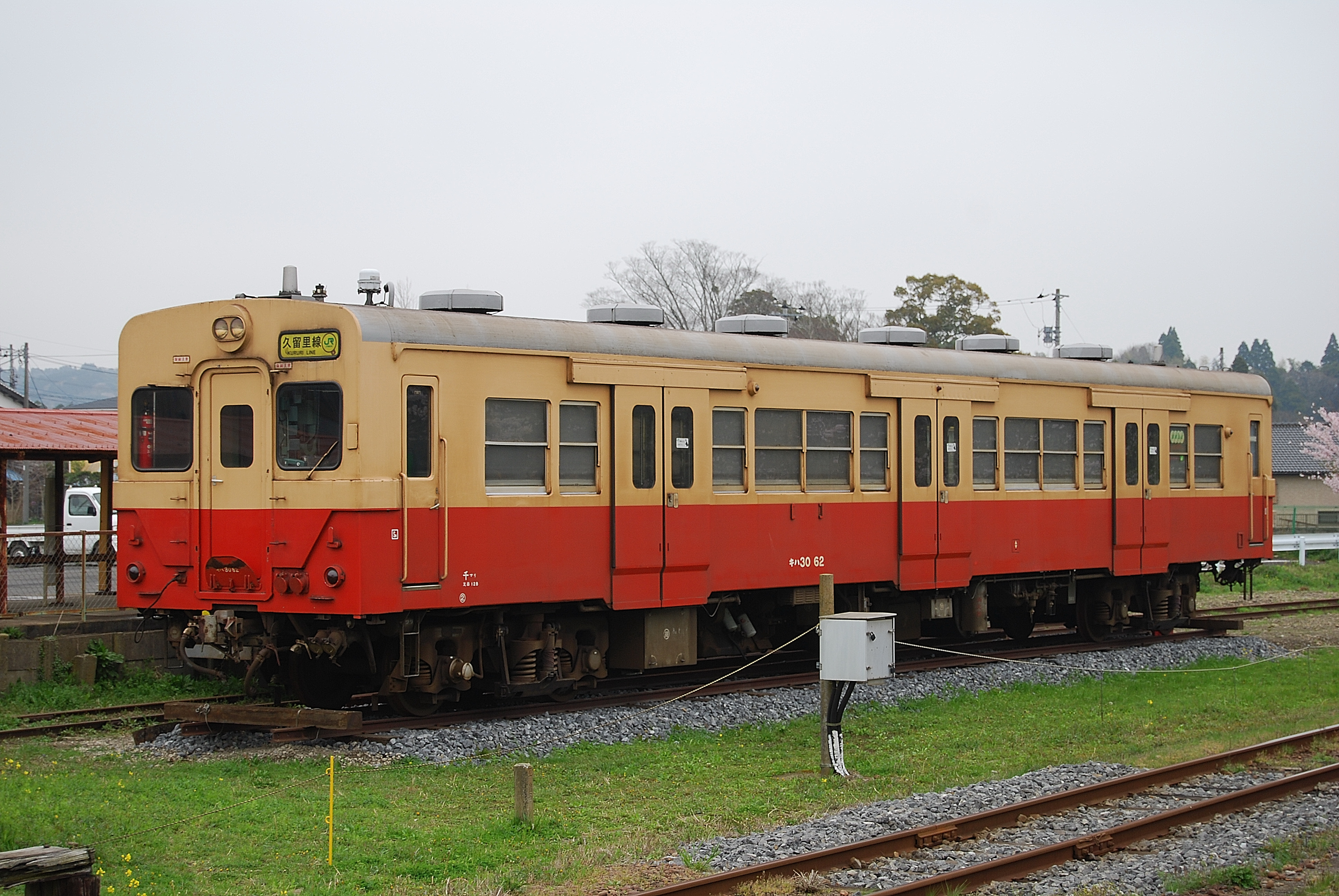
KiHa 30 62 in March 2013

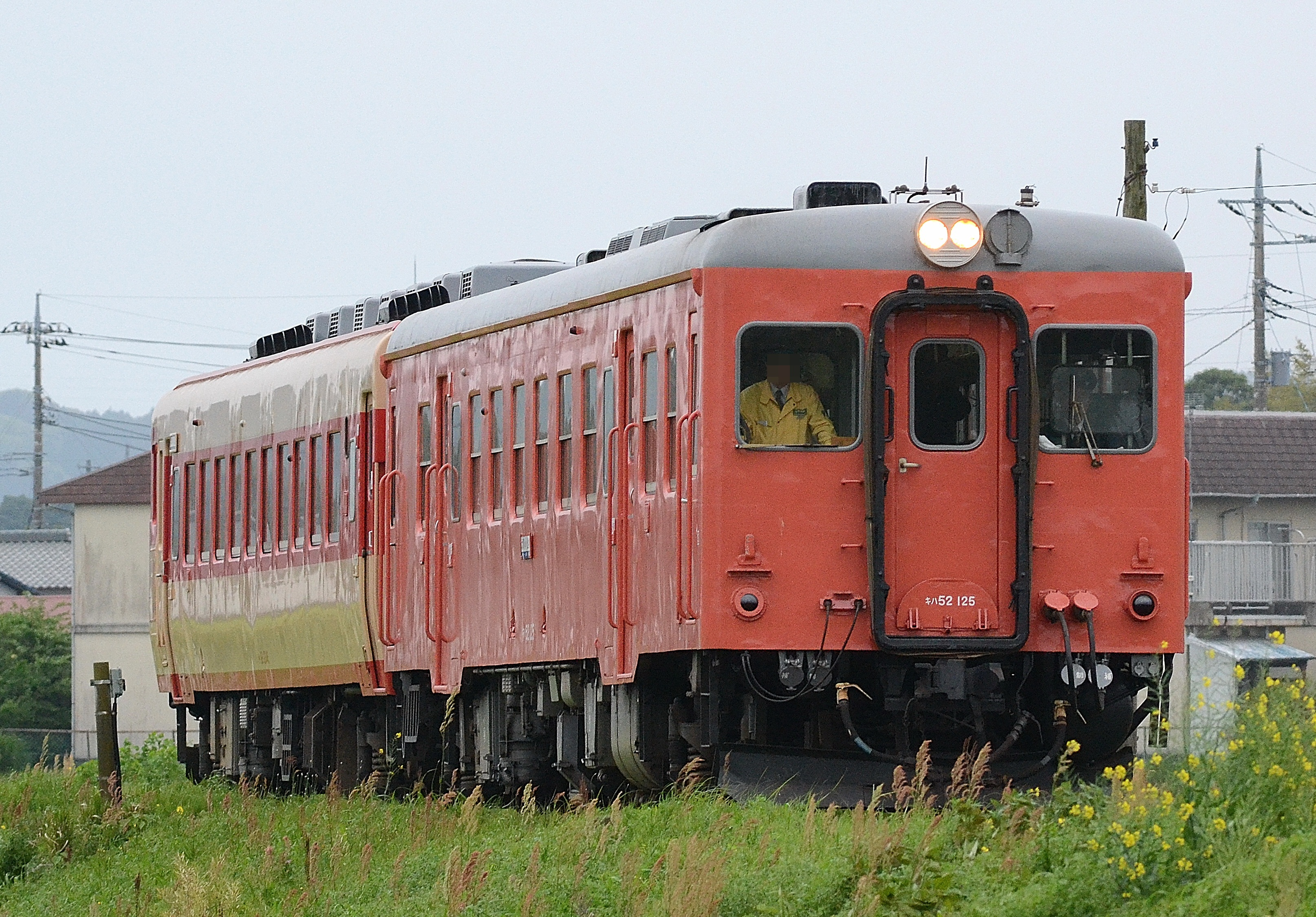
KiHa 52-125 in May 2014

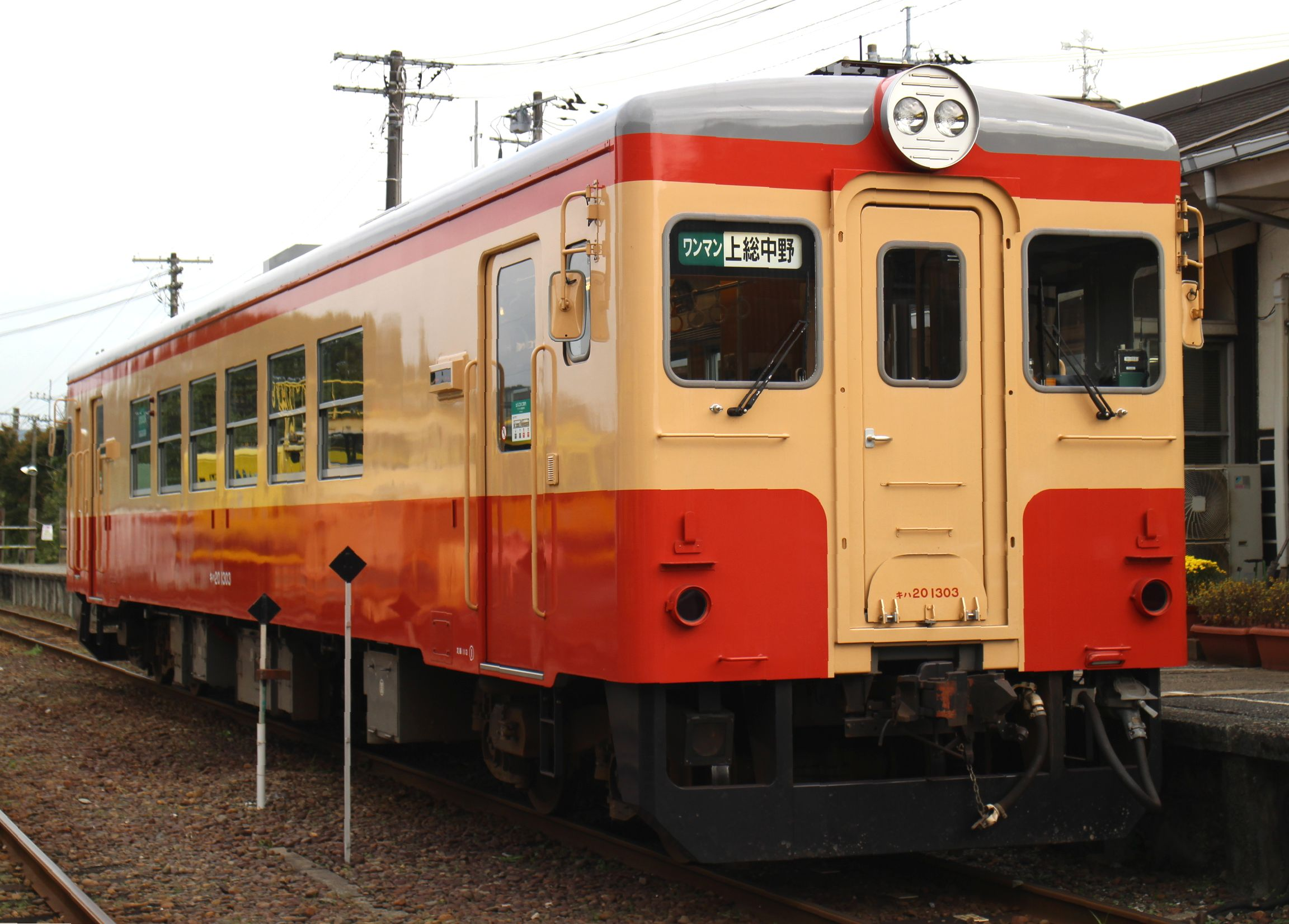
KiHa 20 1303 in October 2015

The line uses a fleet of LE-Car II series diesel railcars classified "Isumi Class 200".

In December 2010, former JR West KiHa 52 diesel car KiHa 52-125, formerly used on the Ōito Line was purchased by the Isumi Railway. This was repainted into JNR standard red and cream livery before entering revenue service.

From March 2012, two new Isumi Class 300 diesel cars entered service on the line. Built by Niigata Transys, these feature transverse seating and toilets.

On 11 October 2012, a former JR West KiHa 28 DMU car, KiHa 28 2346, was delivered to the line. This is used in conjunction with the KiHa 52 125 car.

In January 2013, a JR East KiHa 30 DMU car, KiHa 30 62, previously used on the Kururi Line was delivered to the line.

In 2013, a new Isumi Class 350 diesel car was delivered. Built by Niigata Transys, this car is based on the Isumi Class 300 design, but has longitudinal seating and no toilet. Designed to resemble the former JNR KiHa 20 DMU, the car is finished in the standard Isumi Railway livery of yellow with green bodyside stipes.

In June 2015, a new KiHa 20 diesel car, numbered KiHa 20 1303, was delivered. Built by Niigata Transys, mechanically it is similar to the Class 300 design, and has the same style interior with transverse seating and a toilet, but externally it was built to resemble the JNR KiHa 20 design, like the Class 350 diesel car. The livery is JNR-style red and cream rather than the standard Isumi Railway yellow used on the Class 300 and 350 cars. This unit entered service in September 2015.

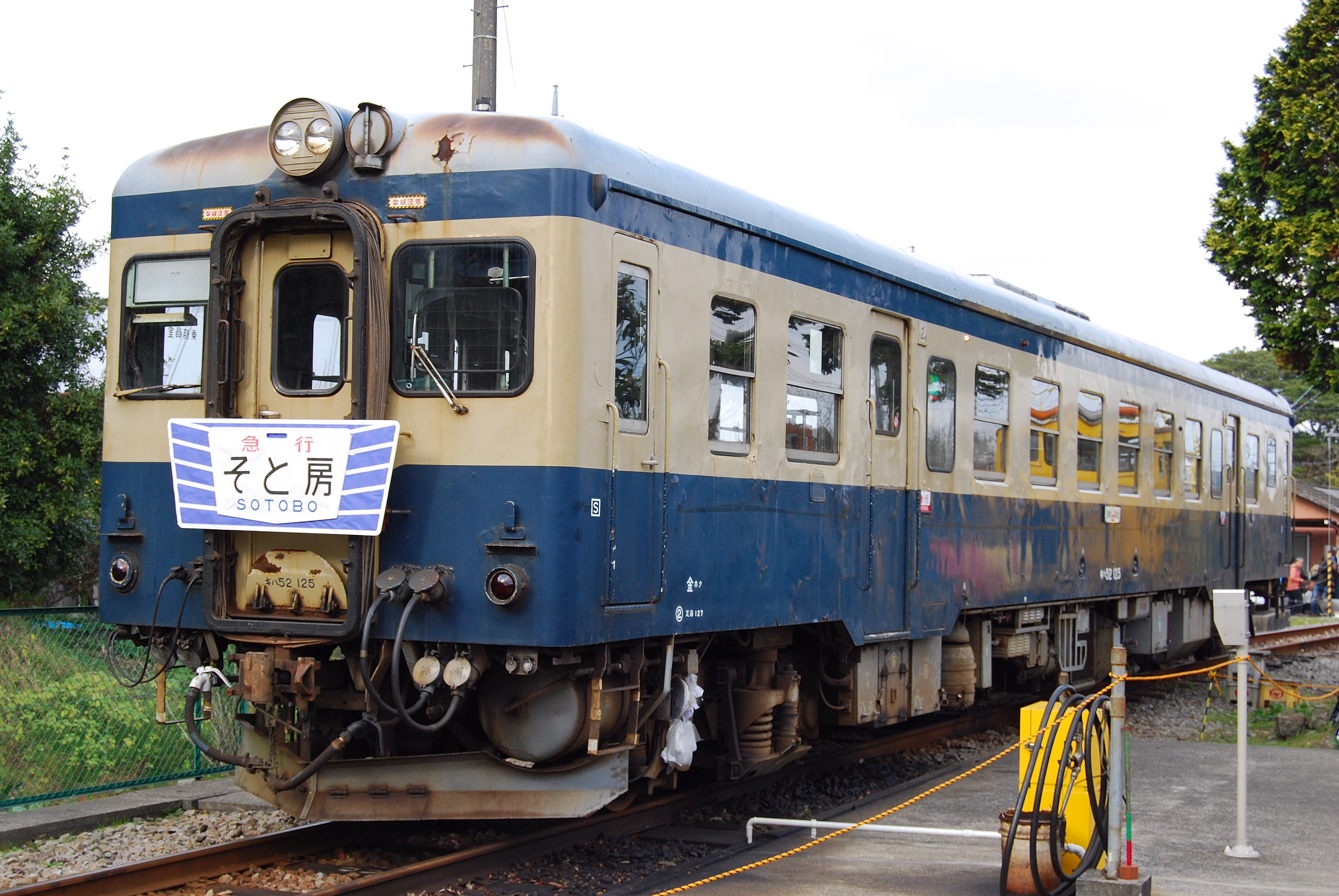
KiHa 52 125 still in blue and beige livery, December 2010

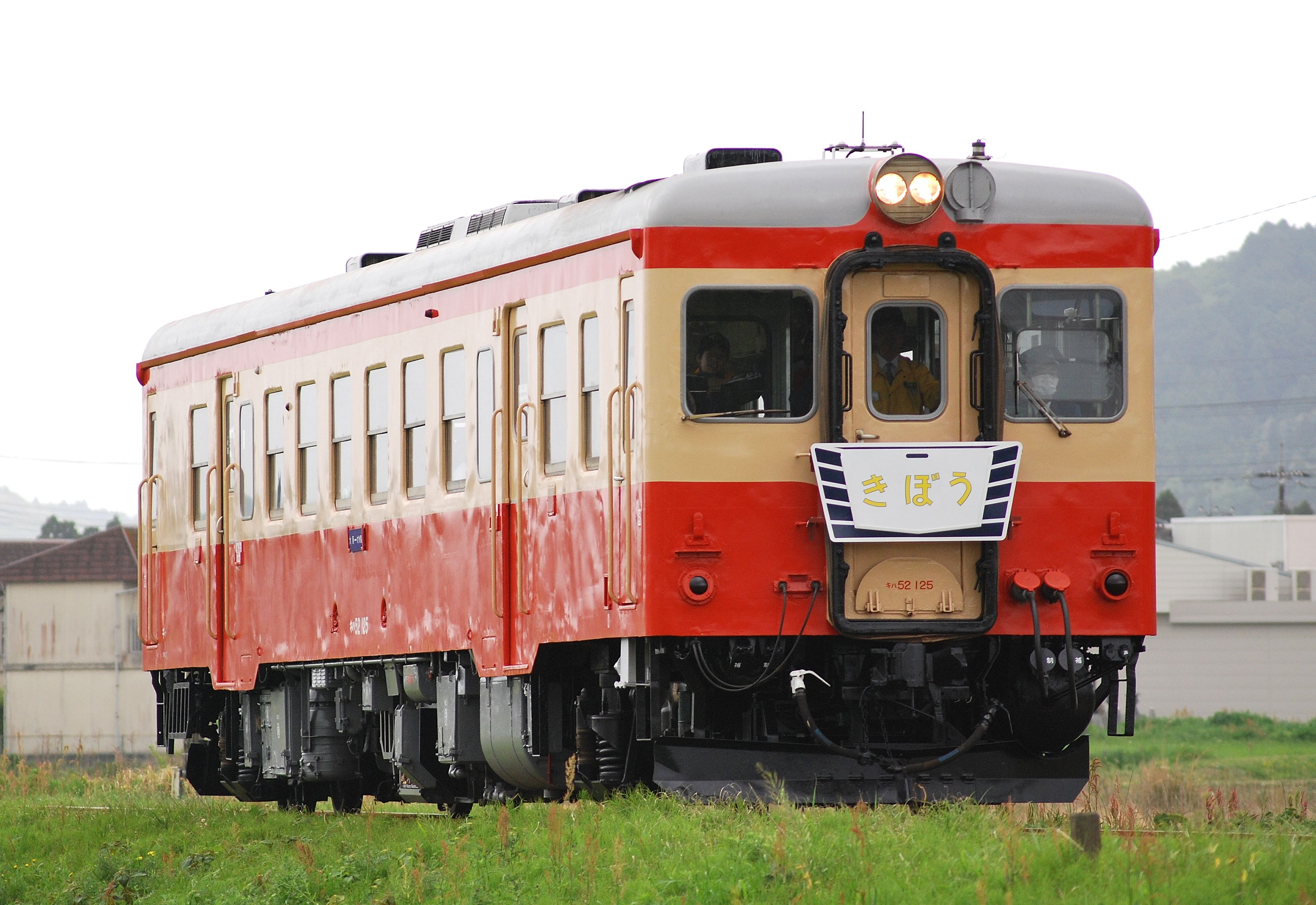
KiHa 52-125 in JNR livery, May 2011

== History ==
Plans for the Isumi Line were drafted by the Railway Ministry under Railway Construction Act in 1922. However, the route already had an existing 609 mm (2 ft) gauge human-powered tramway, which had been opened by the Chiba Prefectural government on 15 December 1912 to connect Ōhara and Ōtaki. Local opposition and the deficit situation of the existing line delayed construction, which did not begin until 1925. The tramway was bought out by the Japanese Government Railways in 1927, and the first section of the new Kihara Line (木原線) was opened on 1 April 1930. The line was extended to Fusamoto by 25 August 1933 and to its present terminus at Kazusa-Nakano on 26 August 1934. As its name implies, the Kihara line was originally intended to connect Ōhara with Kisarazu. However, it was never extended further than Kazusa-Nakano.

In 1954, the first JNR diesel railbus, the KiHa 10000, was introduced on the Kihara Line. Four additional stations were added on 20 June 1960 (Nishi-Ōhara, Nittano, Koyamatsu, and Kugahara). However, on 4 September 1968 the line was listed as one of 83 money-losing local lines recommended for closure. The line problems were compounded in the summer of 1970, when heavy rains washed out a portion of the track, causing a suspension of operations from 1 July through 1 October. Scheduled freight operations were suspended from 1 October 1974. On 18 September 1981, the line was again recommended for closure.

After the breakup and privatization of the JNR on 1 April 1987, the line came under the control of the JR East.

The Isumi Line came into being on 24 March 1988 following the transfer of the assets of the former Kihara Line to the newly formed third-sector railway operator Isumi Railway Company.

The Isumi Railway has attempted to increase revenues by selling naming rights to stations to local industries, leading to some confusion on the correct station names.

The Isumi Line has been suspended since October 2024 due to a derailment caused by poor maintenance of the railway. The line is expected to reopen in late 2027.
