= Ōtaki Station (Chiba) =

Railway station in Ōtaki, Chiba Prefecture, Japan

Coordinates: 35°17′10.98″N 140°14′38.18″E

Ōtaki Station 大多喜駅
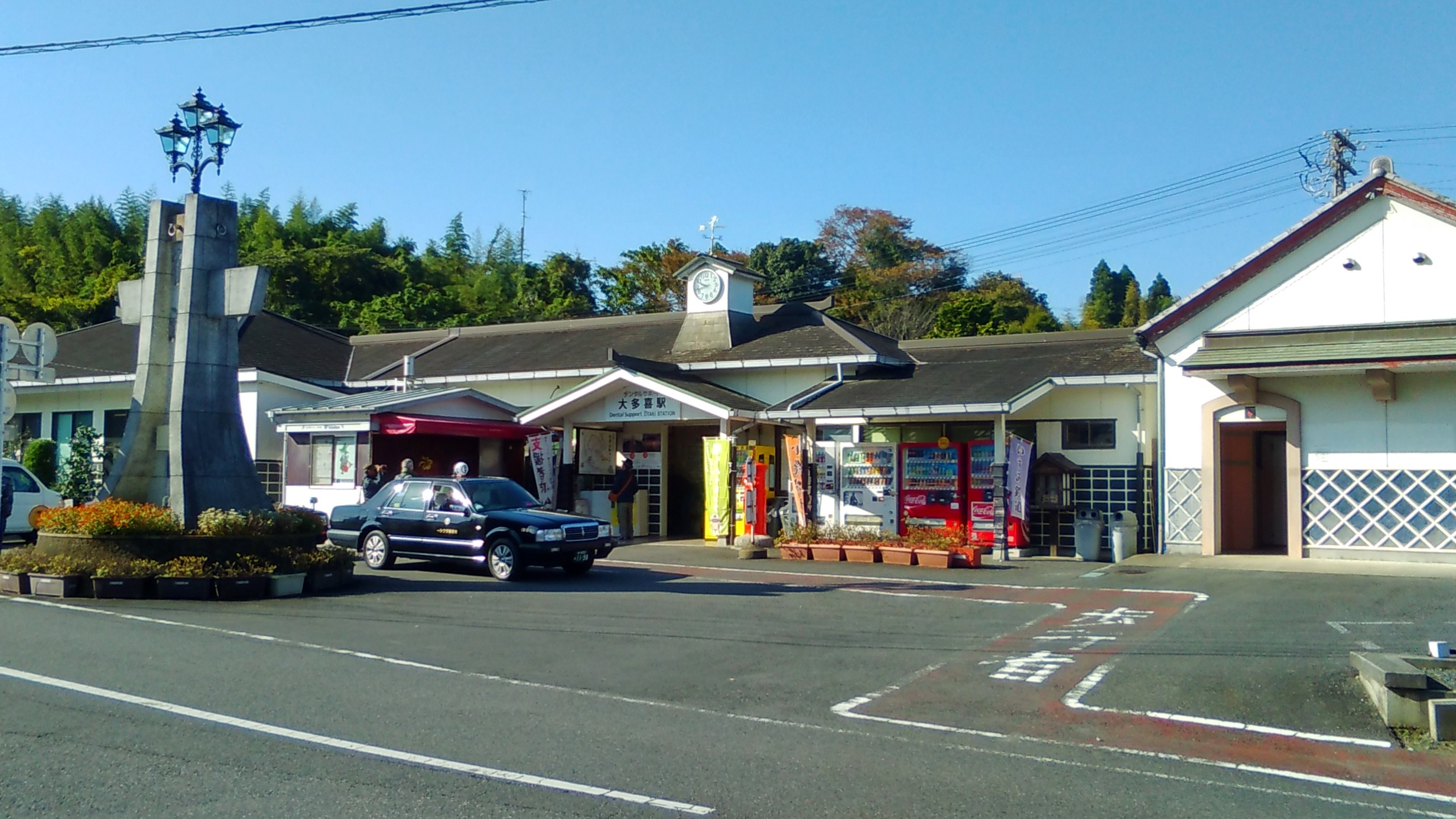
- Otaki Station in November 2016

General information
- Location: 264 Ōtaki, Ōtaki-machi, Isumi-gun, Chiba-ken; Japan
- Operator: Isumi Railway
- Line: Isumi Line
- Distance: 15.9 km from Ōhara
- Platforms: 1 side platforms

History
- Opened: 1 April 1930

Passengers
- 2011: 380 daily

Services
Preceding station	Isumi Railway	Following station
Terminus	Isumi Line Express	Shiromigaoka towards Ōhara
Koyamatsu towards Kazusa-Nakano	Isumi Line Local	Shiromigaoka towards Ōhara
Location
- Location within Japan

Ōtaki Station (大多喜駅, Ōtaki-eki) is a railway station on the Isumi Line in Ōtaki, Chiba Prefecture, Japan, operated by the third-sector railway operating company Isumi Railway.

== Lines ==
Ōtaki Station is served by the 26.8 km Isumi Line, and lies 15.9 km from the eastern terminus of the line at Ōhara.

== Station layout ==
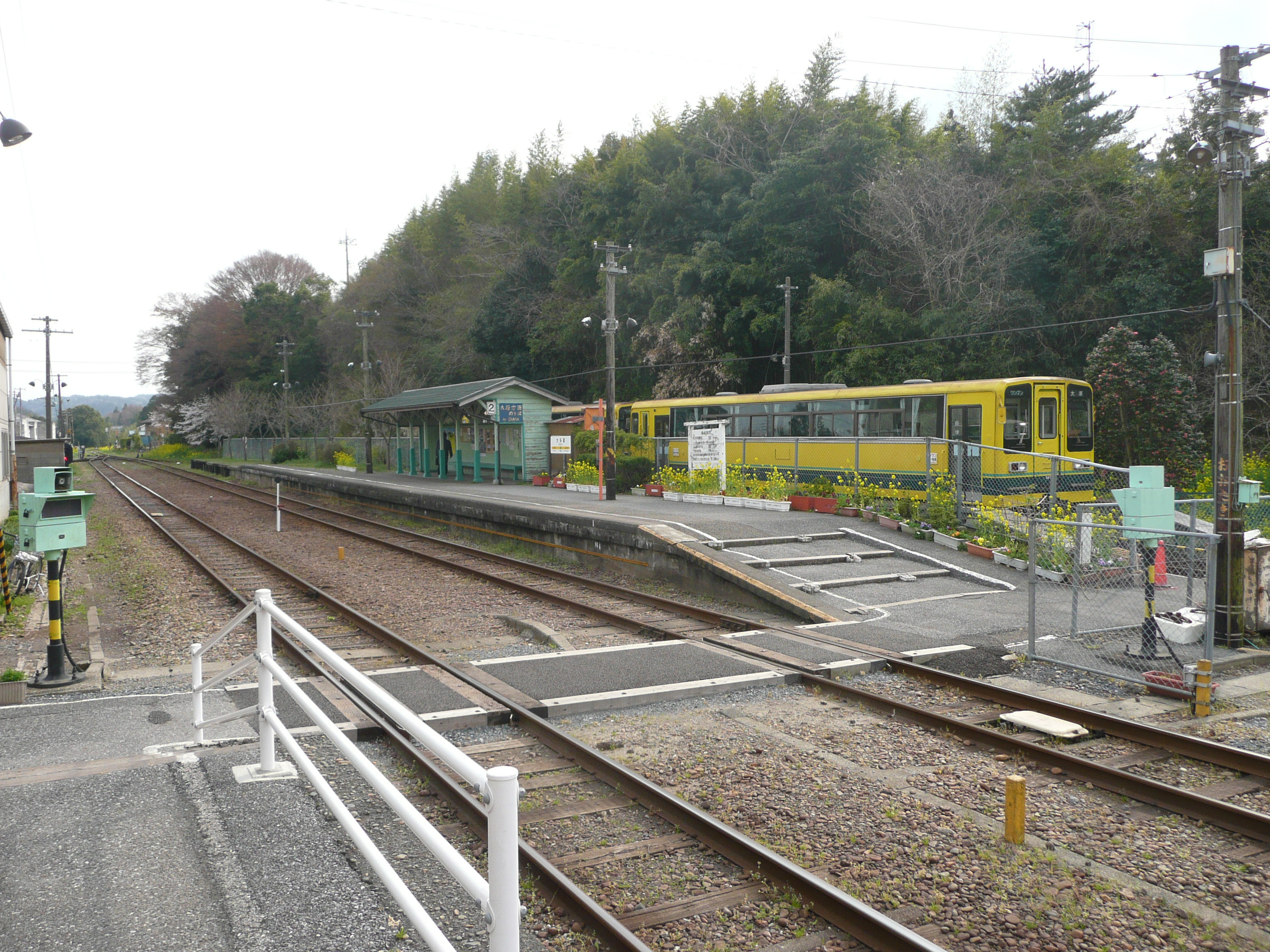
The platform at Ōtaki Station

Ōtaki Station has a two opposed side platforms, with the station building connected to Platform 1.

=== Platforms ===
1	■ Isumi Line	for Kazusa-Nakano
2	■ Isumi Line	for Ōhara

== History ==
Ōtaki Station opened on April 1, 1930, as the initial terminal station on the Japanese Government Railway (JGR) Kihara Line. The line was extended on to Fusamoto by August 25, 1933. After World War II, the JGR became the Japanese National Railways (JNR). Scheduled freight operations were discontinued from October 1, 1974. With the division and privatization of the Japan National Railways on April 1, 1987, the station was acquired by the East Japan Railway Company (JR East). On March 24, 1988, the Kihara Line became the Isumi Railway Isumi Line.

From September 1, 2009, the station's signage was changed to reflect its new unofficial name of Dental-Support Ōtaki Station (デンタルサポート大多喜駅, Dentaru-suppōto Ōtaki-eki).

== Passenger statistics ==
In fiscal 2011, the station was used by an average of 380 passengers daily, making it the busiest station on the line.

== See also ==
- List of railway stations in Japan
