= Ōhara Station (Chiba) =

Railway station in Isumi, Chiba Prefecture, Japan

Ōhara Station 大原駅
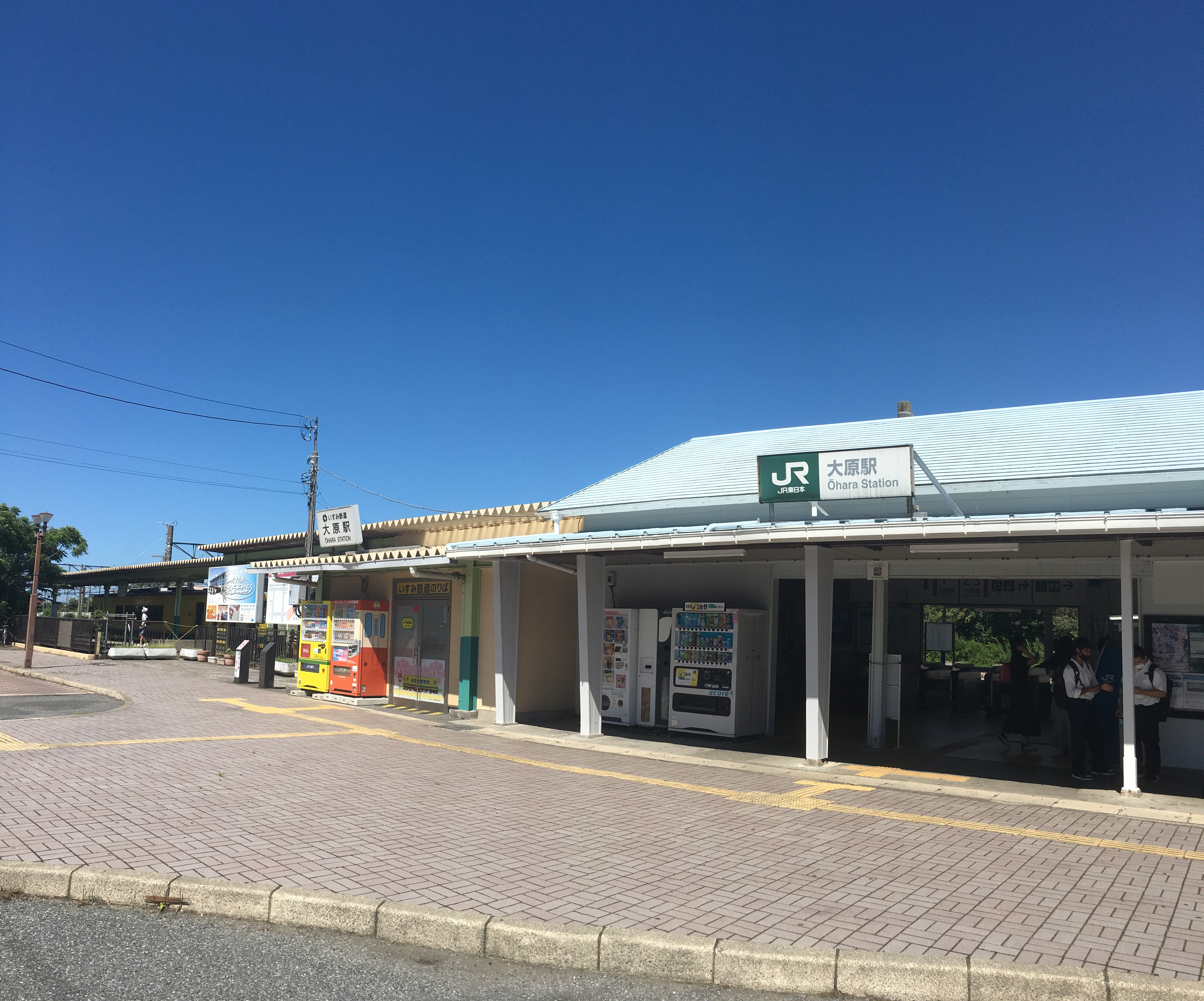
- The JR East station entrance (right) and the Isumi Railway entrance (left) in August 2021

General information
- Location: 8701 Ōhara, Isumi-shi, Chiba-ken 298-0004; Japan
- Coordinates: 35°15′3.5″N 140°23′27.1″E
- Operator: JR East; Isumi Railway
- Lines: ■ Sotobo Line; ■ Isumi Line
- Distance: 57.2 km from Chiba
- Platforms: 1 island + 1 side + 1 bay platform

Other information
- Status: Staffed (Midori no Madoguchi )
- Website: Official website

History
- Opened: 13 December 1899; 126 years ago

Passengers
- 1402 (JR FY2019); 324 (Isumi FY2018)

Services
Preceding station	JR East	Following station
Kazusa-Ichinomiya towards Tokyo	Wakashio	Onjuku towards Awa-Kamogawa
Mikado towards Soga	Sotobō Line Keiyō Rapid	Namihana towards Katsuura
Mikado towards Soga or Chiba	Sotobō Line Local	Namihana towards Awa-Kamogawa
Preceding station	Isumi Railway	Following station
Kazusa-Azuma towards Ōtaki	Isumi Line Express	Terminus
Nishi-Ōhara towards Kazusa-Nakano	Isumi Line Local	Terminus
Location
- Location within Chiba Prefecture Location within Japan

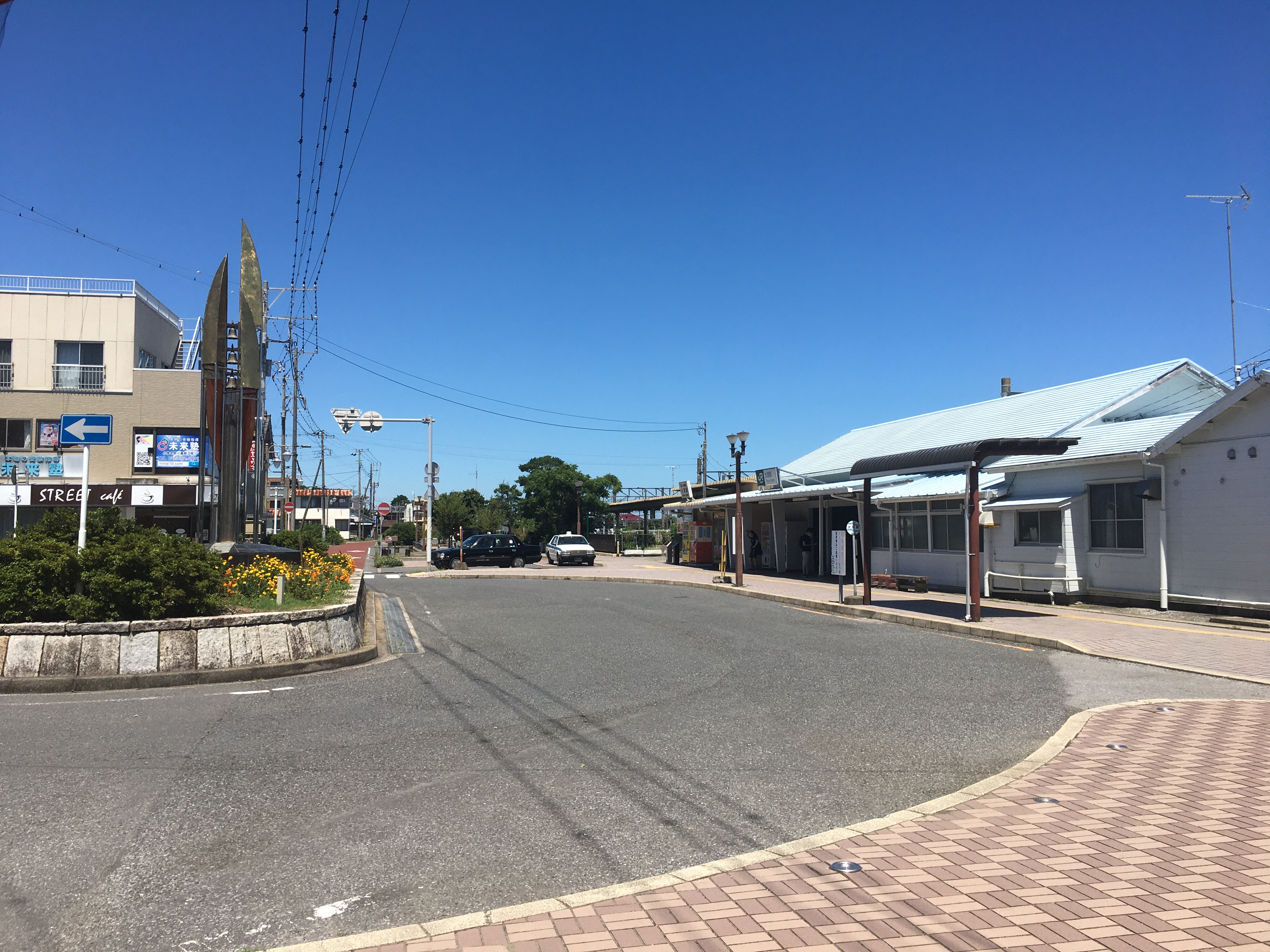
The station forecourt in August 2021

Ōhara Station (大原駅, Ōhara-eki) is a junction passenger railway station in the city of Isumi, Chiba, Japan, operated by the East Japan Railway Company (JR East) and the third-sector railway operator Isumi Railway.

== Lines ==
Ōhara Station is served by the JR East Sotobō Line and the Isumi Railway Company Isumi Line. Limited express Wakashio services from Tokyo to Awa-Kamogawa stop at this station. It is located 57.2 km (35.5 mi) from the starting point of the Sotobō Line at Chiba Station, and forms the eastern terminus of the 26.8-kilometer (16.7 mi) Isumi Line.

== Station layout ==
The JR East station consists of one side platform and an island platform serving three tracks. The station has a Midori no Madoguchi staffed ticket office. The Isumi Railway has a single bay platform serving two tracks. The two station buildings are adjacent and are connected together.

=== JR East platforms ===
1	■ Sotobo Line	for Kazusa-Ichinomiya, Chiba, and Tokyo for Katsuura and Awa-Kamogawa
2	■ Sotobo Line	for Kazusa-Ichinomiya, Chiba, and Tokyo
3	■ Sotobo Line	for Katsuura and Awa-Kamogawa

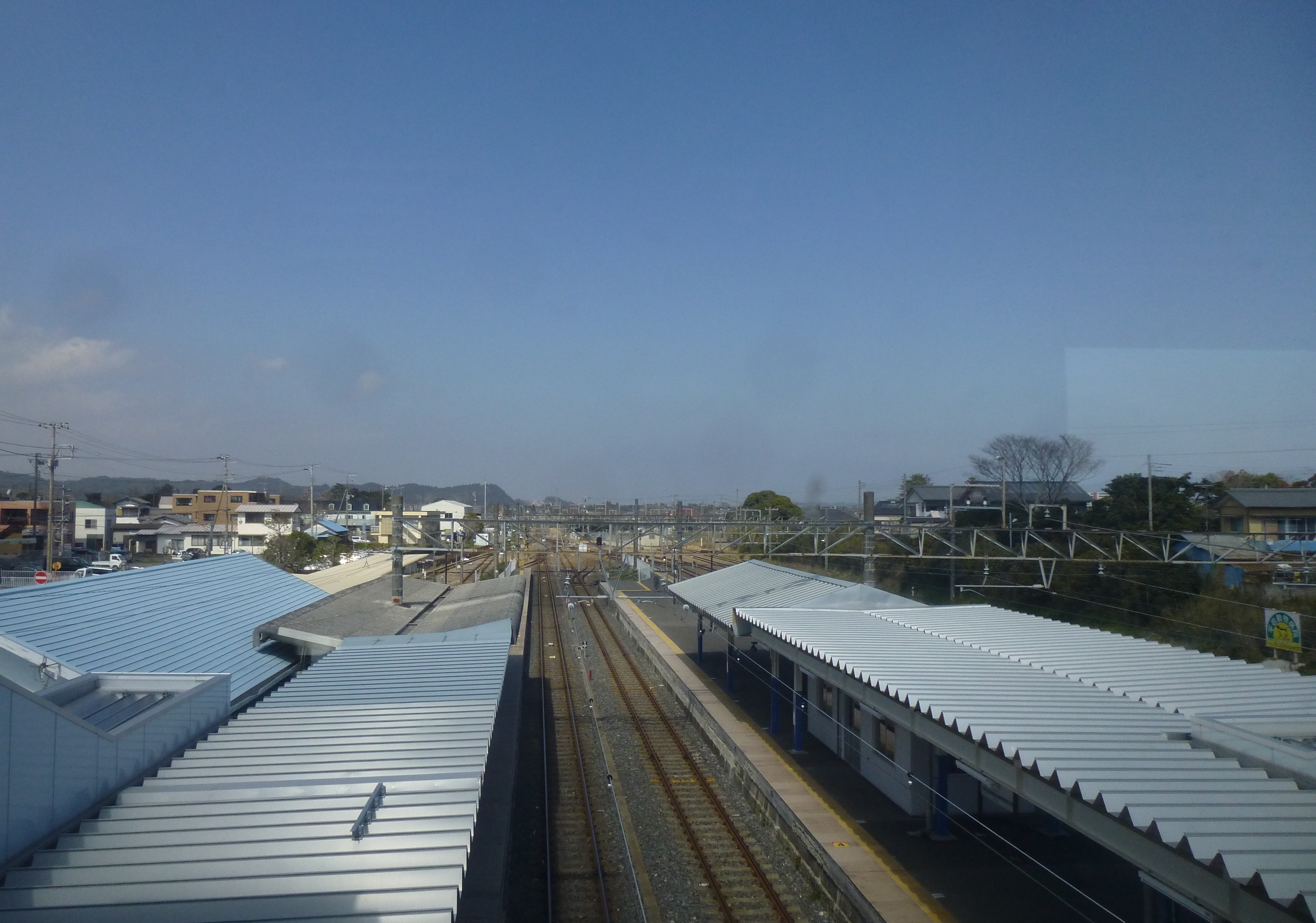
The JR East platforms in May 2013

=== Isumi Line platforms ===
1-2	■ Isumi Line	for Ōtaki and Kazusa-Nakano

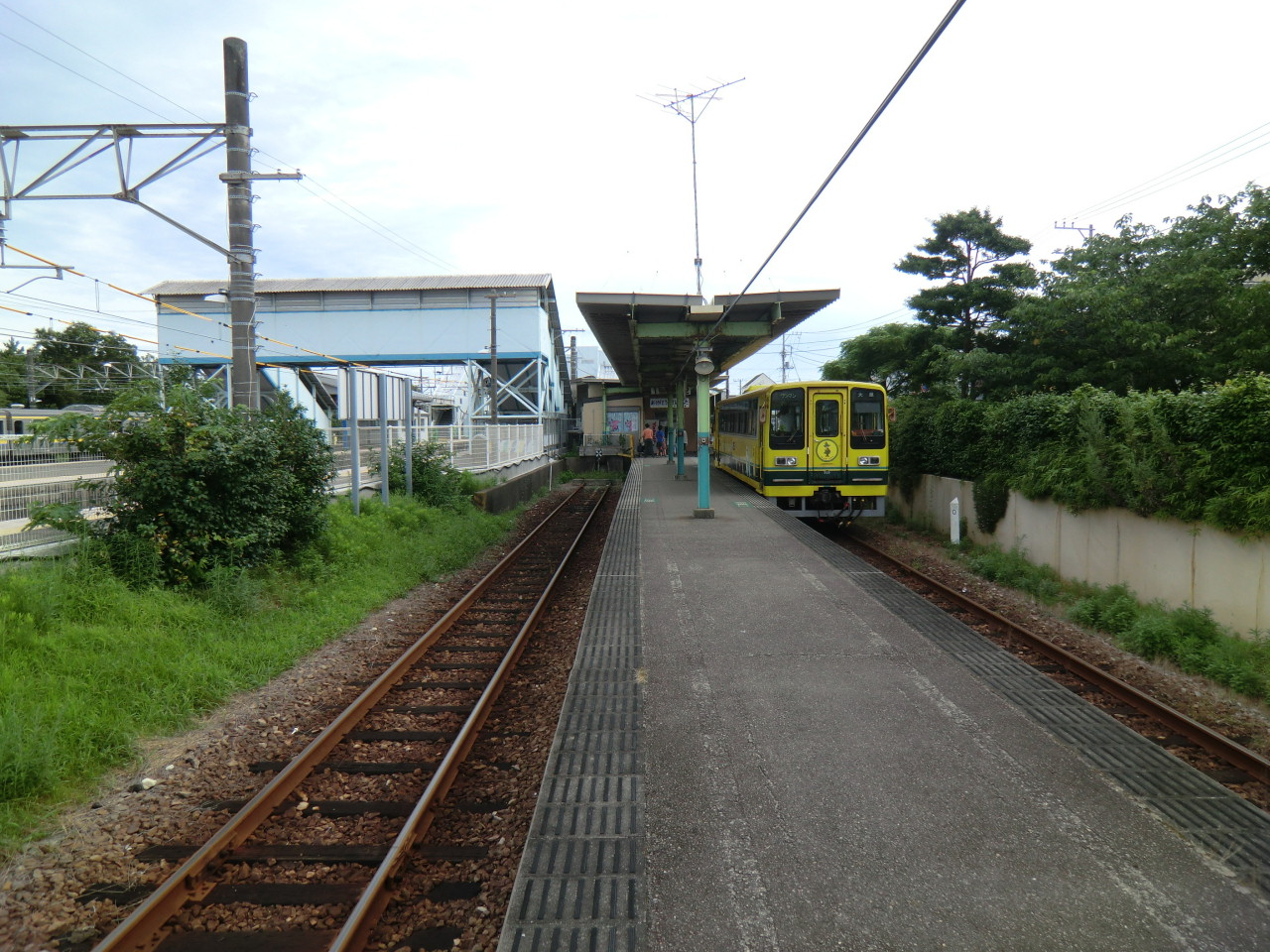
The Isumi Railway platform in July 2011

== History ==
Ōhara Station opened on 13 December 1899, as the terminal station of the Bōsō Railway. On 1 September 1907, the Bōsō Railway was nationalized and became part of the Japanese Government Railways, which became the Japanese National Railways (JNR) after World War II.

Freight operations were discontinued from 1 February 1984. The station was absorbed into the JR East network upon the privatization of JNR on 1 April 1987. On 24 March 1988, the Kihara Line was split off from the JR East network to be operated by the third-sector Isumi Railway.

== Passenger statistics ==
In fiscal 2019, JR East's Ōhara Station was used by an average of 1,402 passengers daily (boarding passengers only). In fiscal 2018, the Izumi Railway portion of the station was used by an average of 324 passengers daily.

== Surrounding area ==
- Isumi City Office
- Ōhara Fishing Port
- Ōhara High School
- National Route 128
- National Route 465

== See also ==
- List of railway stations in Japan
