= Ōtaki Castle =

Ōtaki Castle may refer to:

- Ōtaki Castle (Chiba) - a Japanese castle located in Ōtaki, Chiba
- Ōtaki Castle (Fukui) - a Japanese castle located in Echizen, Fukui
