= Kazusa Kokubun-ji =

Buddhist temple in Ichihara, Chiba, Japan

- 上総国分寺
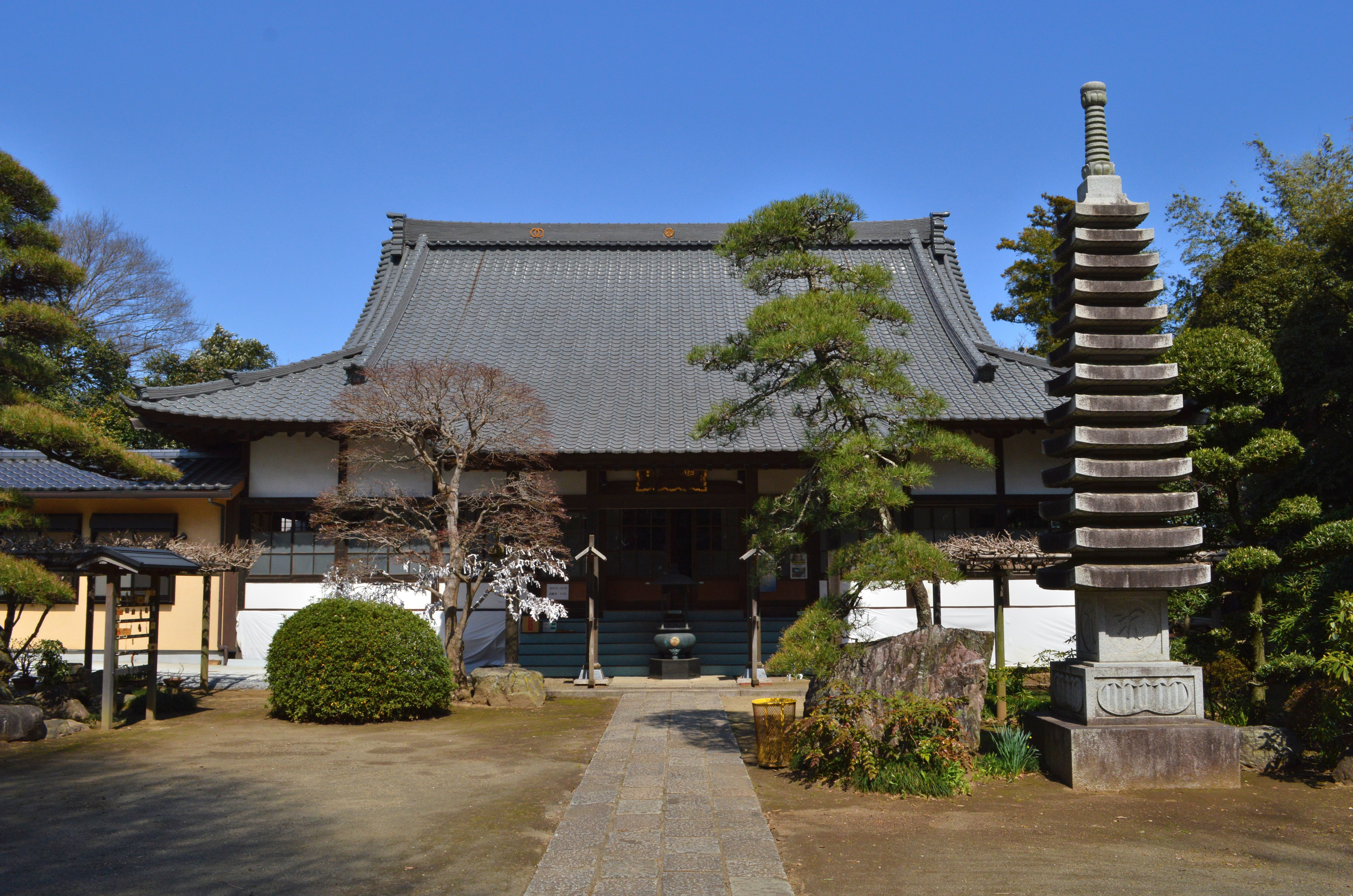
- Kazusa Kokubun-ji Hondō

- Kazusa Kokubun-ji Kazusa Kokubun-ji (Japan)

Religion
- Affiliation: Buddhist
- Deity: Yakushi Nyorai
- Rite: Shingon-shu Buzan-ha
- Status: active

Location
- Location: 1-7-23 Soja, Ichihara-shi, Chiba-ken
- Country: Japan
- Interactive map of Kazusa Kokubun-ji
- Coordinates: 35°29′47″N 140°06′41″E

Architecture
- Founder: Emperor Shōmu
- Completed: 741AD
- National Historic Site of Japan

Kazusa Kokubun-ji (上総国分寺) is a Buddhist temple located in the city of Ichihara, Chiba, Japan. It belongs to the Shingon-shu Buzan-ha sect, and its honzon is a statue of Yakushi Nyōrai. It is the provincial temple ("kokubunji") of former Kazusa Province. The present temple is of uncertain foundation, but claims to be the direct descendant of the original Nara period kokubunji temple which fell into ruins sometime in the Muromachi period. The Nara-period temple ruins were designated a National Historic Site in 1929, with the area under protection expanded in 1979 due to additional archaeological finds.

== Kazusa Kokubun-ji ==
The Shoku Nihongi records that in 741 AD, as the country recovered from a major smallpox epidemic, Emperor Shōmu ordered that a monastery and nunnery be established in every province, the kokubunji (国分寺). These temples had the purpose of promoting Buddhism as the national religion of Japan and standardizing control of imperial rule over the provinces.

The Kazusa Kokubun-ji was located on the northern bank of the Yōrō River, in an area with a high concentration of kofun burial mounds and other ancient sites, including the site of the Kazusa Kokubun-niji provincial nunnery to the northeast. The details of the foundation of the Kazusa Kokubun-ji are unclear. It appears in historical records only in the Ōei era (1394-1427), but appears to have fallen into ruin soon after. It was revived during the Edo period during the Genroku era (1688-1704), and the current main hall, a Yakushi-dō, was built in 1716 on the site of the old temple. The temple's Niōmon also dates from the Edo period, but one of the statues within is a survivor from the Nanboku-chō period.

The site of the temple was located in 1929 with the discovery of large number of roof tiles inscribed "kokubun-ji". An archaeological excavation in 1966 confirmed the foundation stones for the Kondō, and Lecture Hall, and the middle gate as well as that of a pagoda. From the size of the foundations for the pagoda, it is estimated that the completed structure was a seven-story building with a height of around 60-meters. The remains of a group of kilns for producing roof tiles were located in a survey conducted in 1974 to the west of the main temple complex. The temple area for is not square because there are valleys and burial mounds around it. Roughly, it is trapezoidal, measuring 478 meters north-to-south by between 254 meters and 345 meters from east-to-west, for a total area of 139,000 square meters. The inner compound containing the main buildings of the temple was 219 meters north-to-south by 194 meters east-to-west, and unlike other kokubunji temples, did not adhere to the standardized layout based on the template of Tōdai-ji, but was patterned instead after the temple of Daikandai-ji in Asuka. This indicates that it may have been a pre-existing temple repurposed into a kokubunji. A model of what the temple would look like is on display at the Chiba Prefectural Museum and Information Center, and a model of the pagoda is on display at Ichihara City Hall.

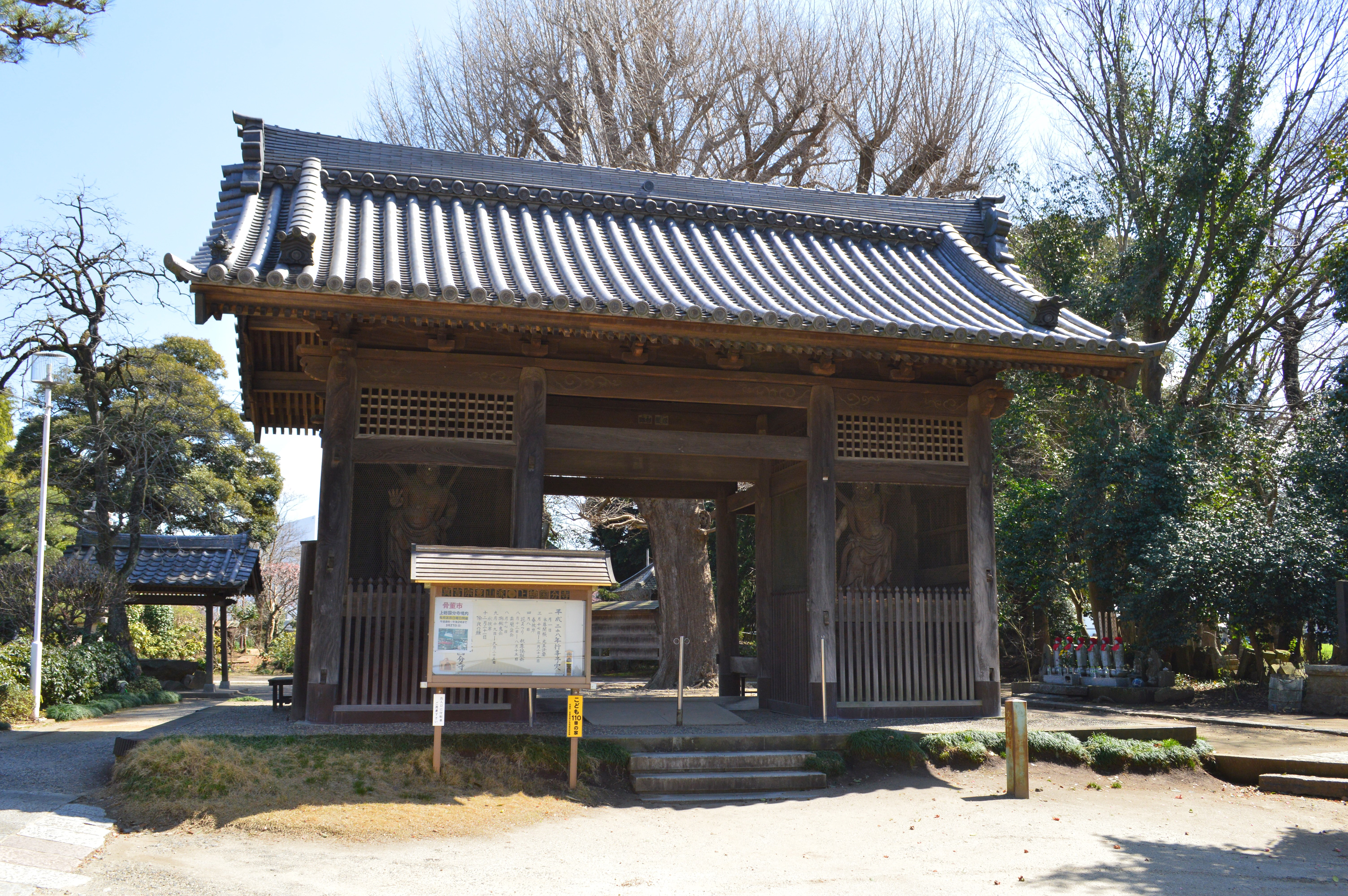
Niōmon

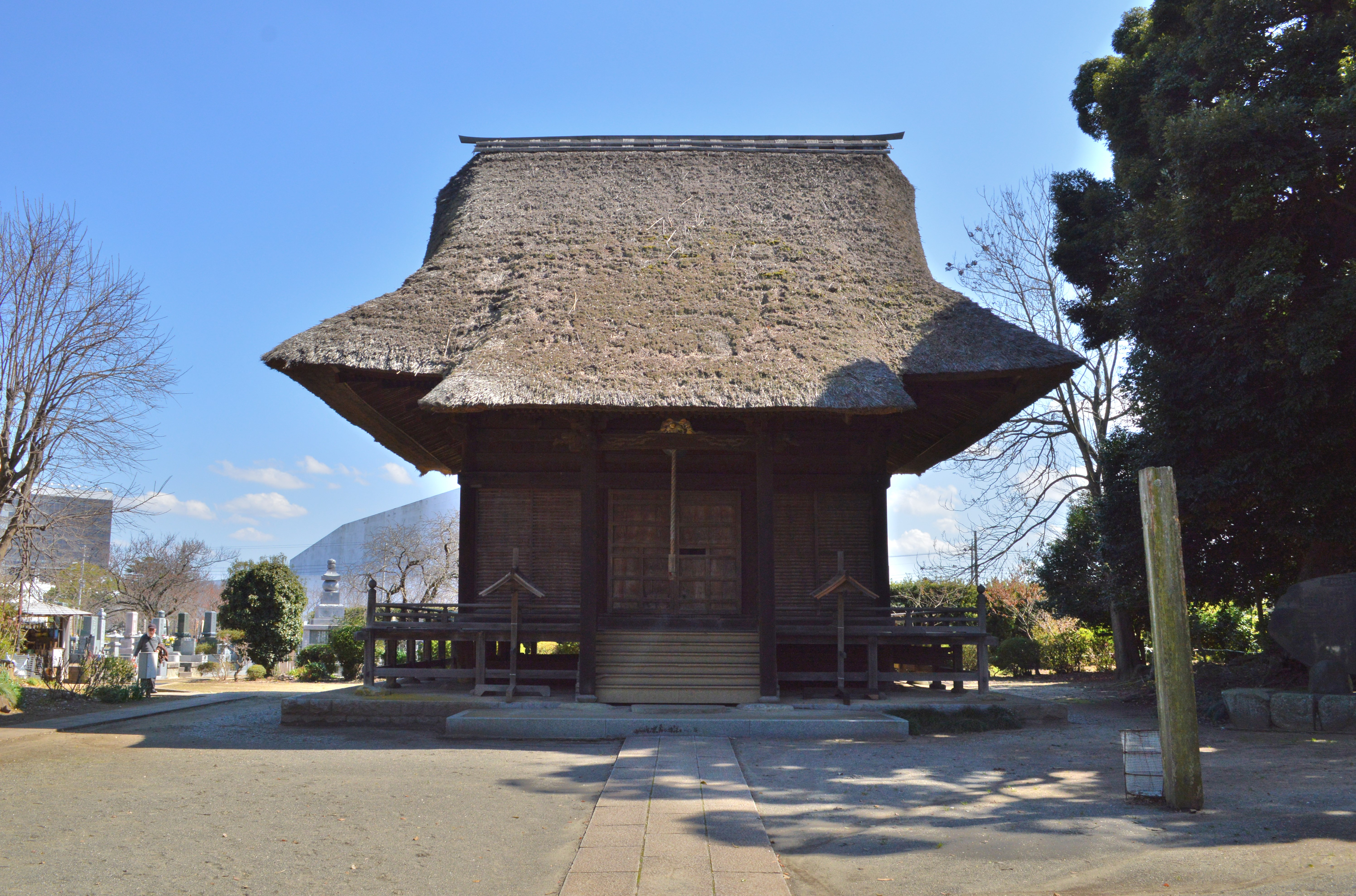
Yakushi-dō

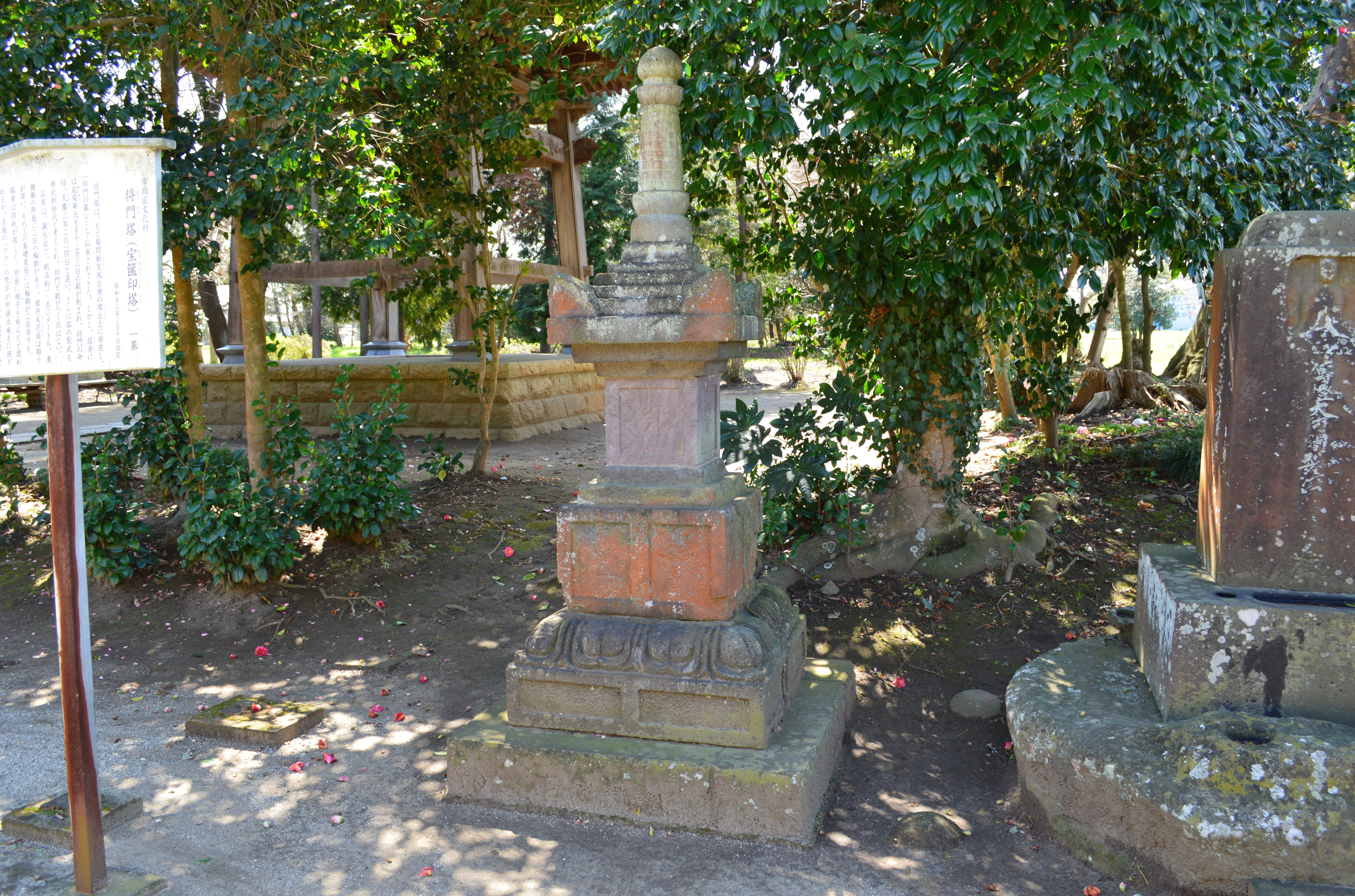
Memorial stupa to Taira no Masakado

The remains of original kokubunji overlap with the current temple precincts. The temple's Yakushi-dō, the two Niō statues in its Niōmon, and a stone memorial monument to Taira no Masakado are all designated as Tangible Cultural Properties of Ichihara city. The temple is located a 15-minute walk from Kazusa-Murakami Station on the Kominato Railway Kominato Line.

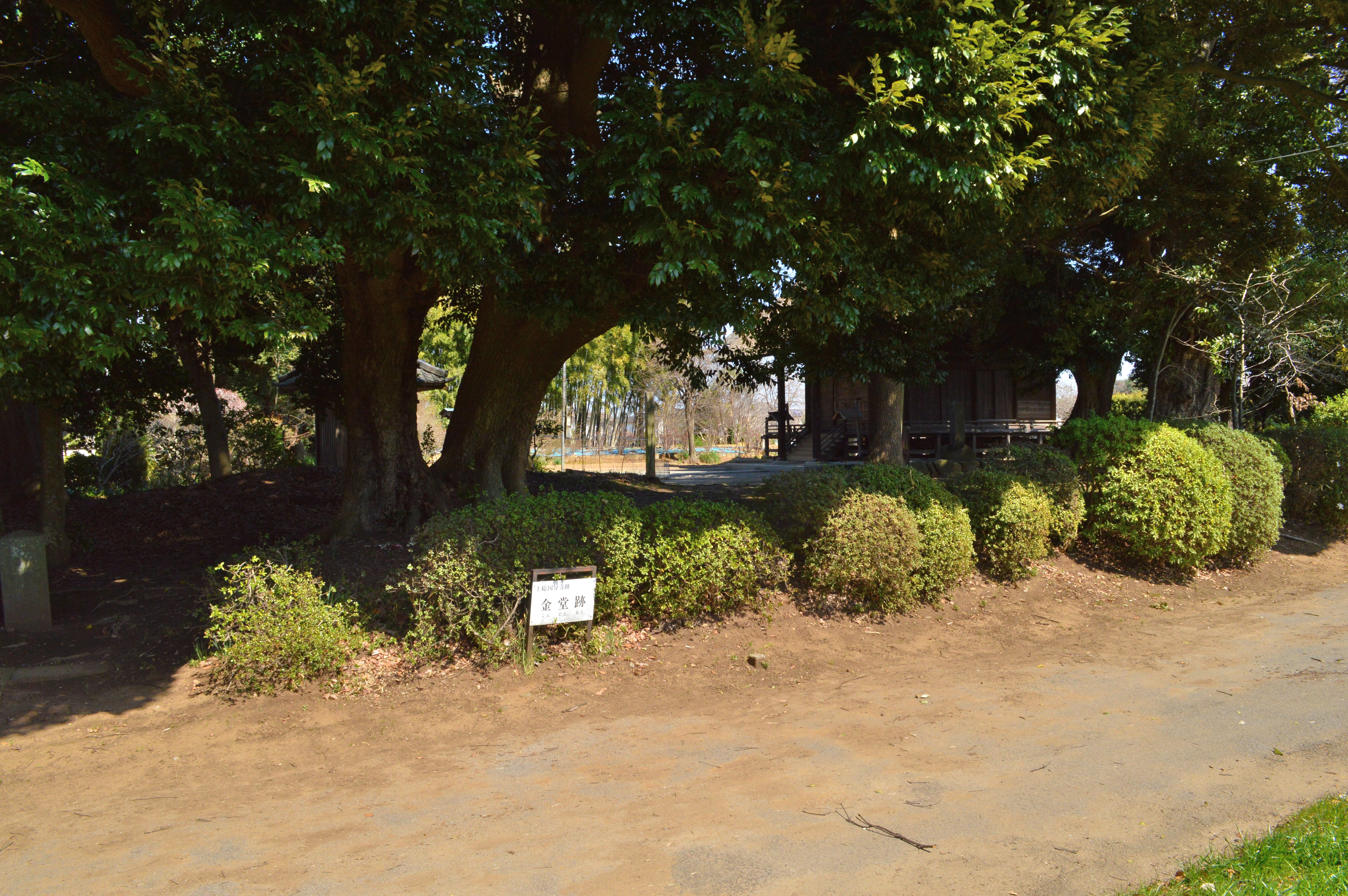
Site of Kondō

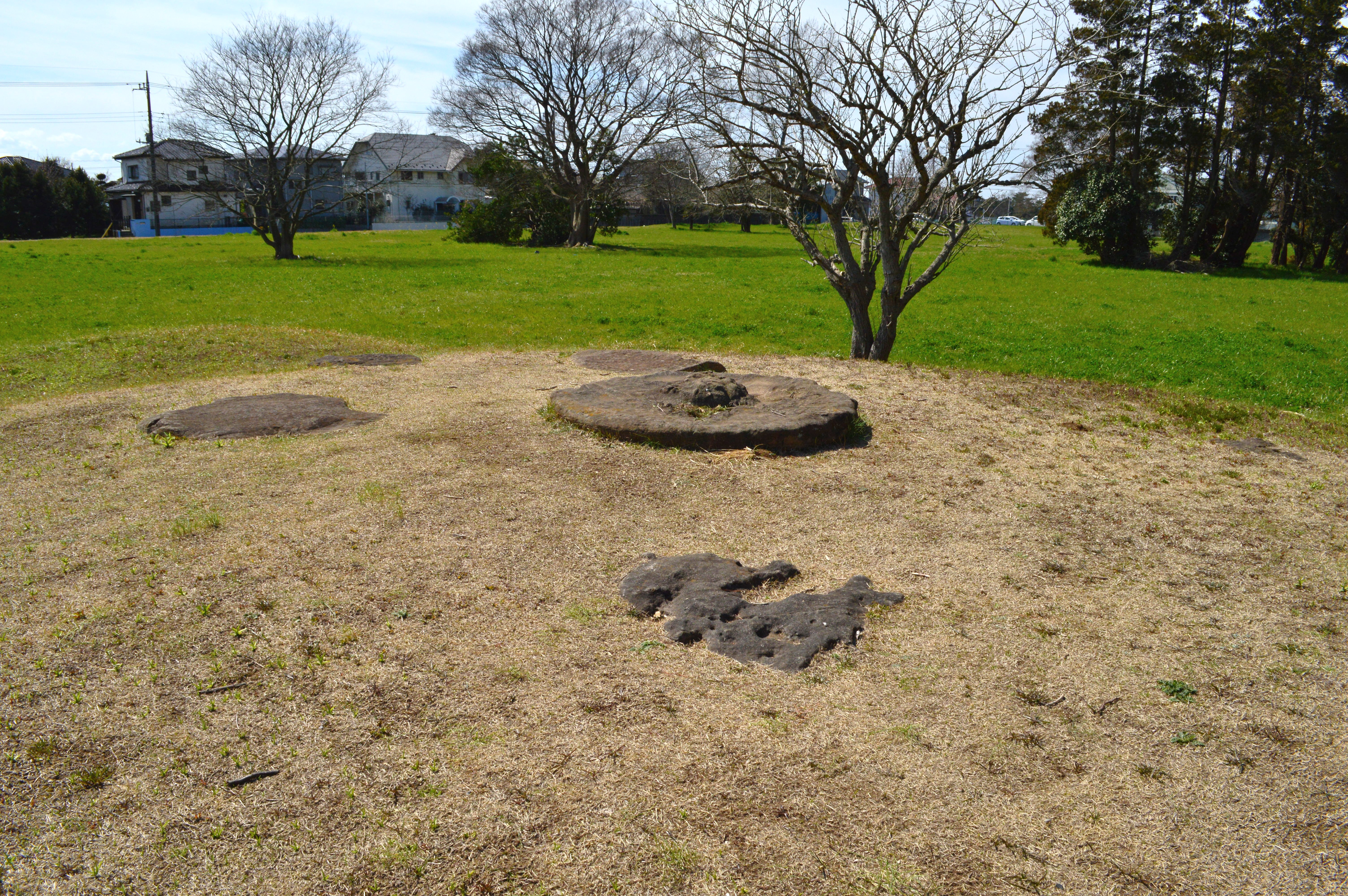
Site of the Pagoda

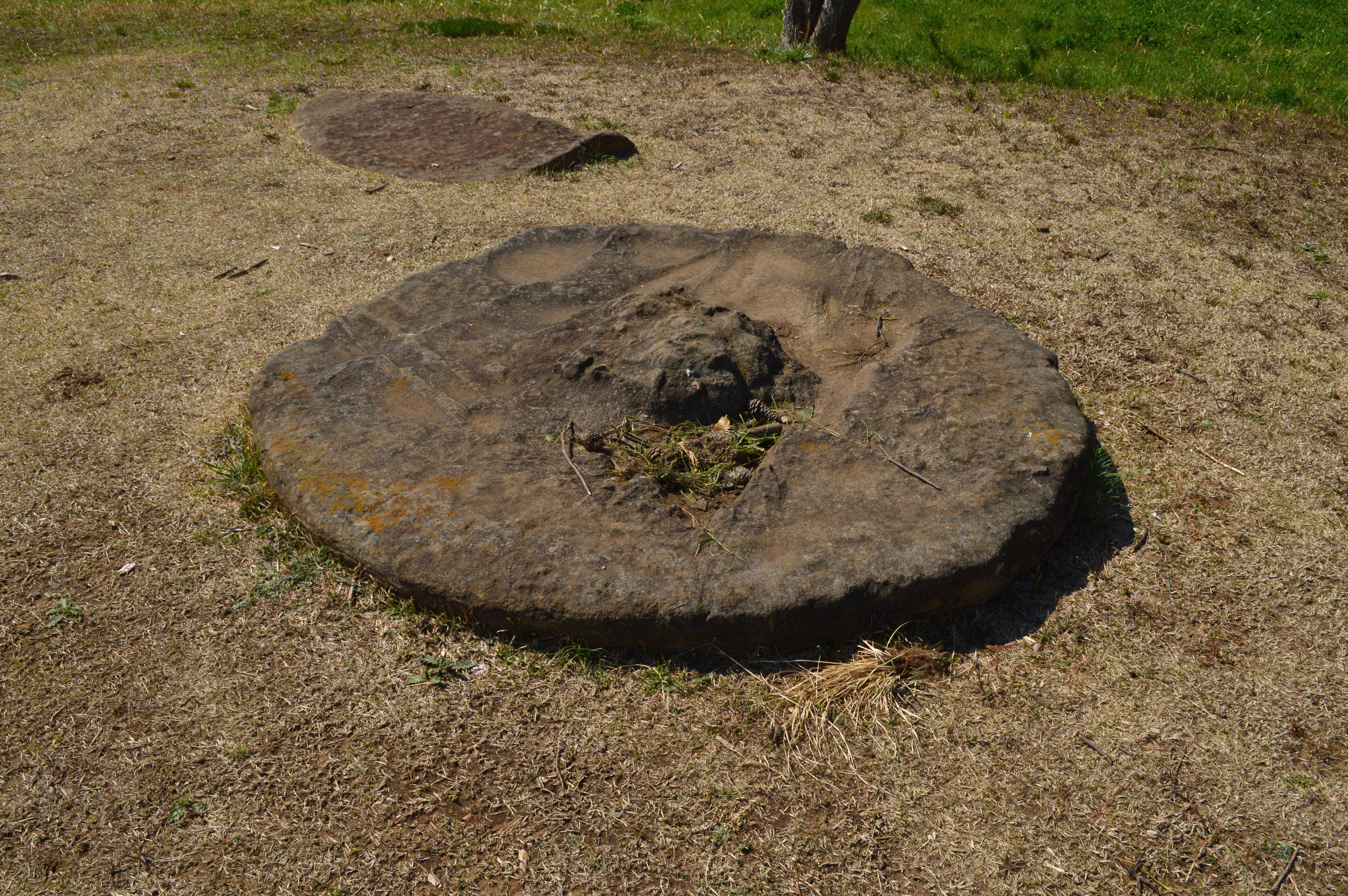
Foundation stone of pagoda

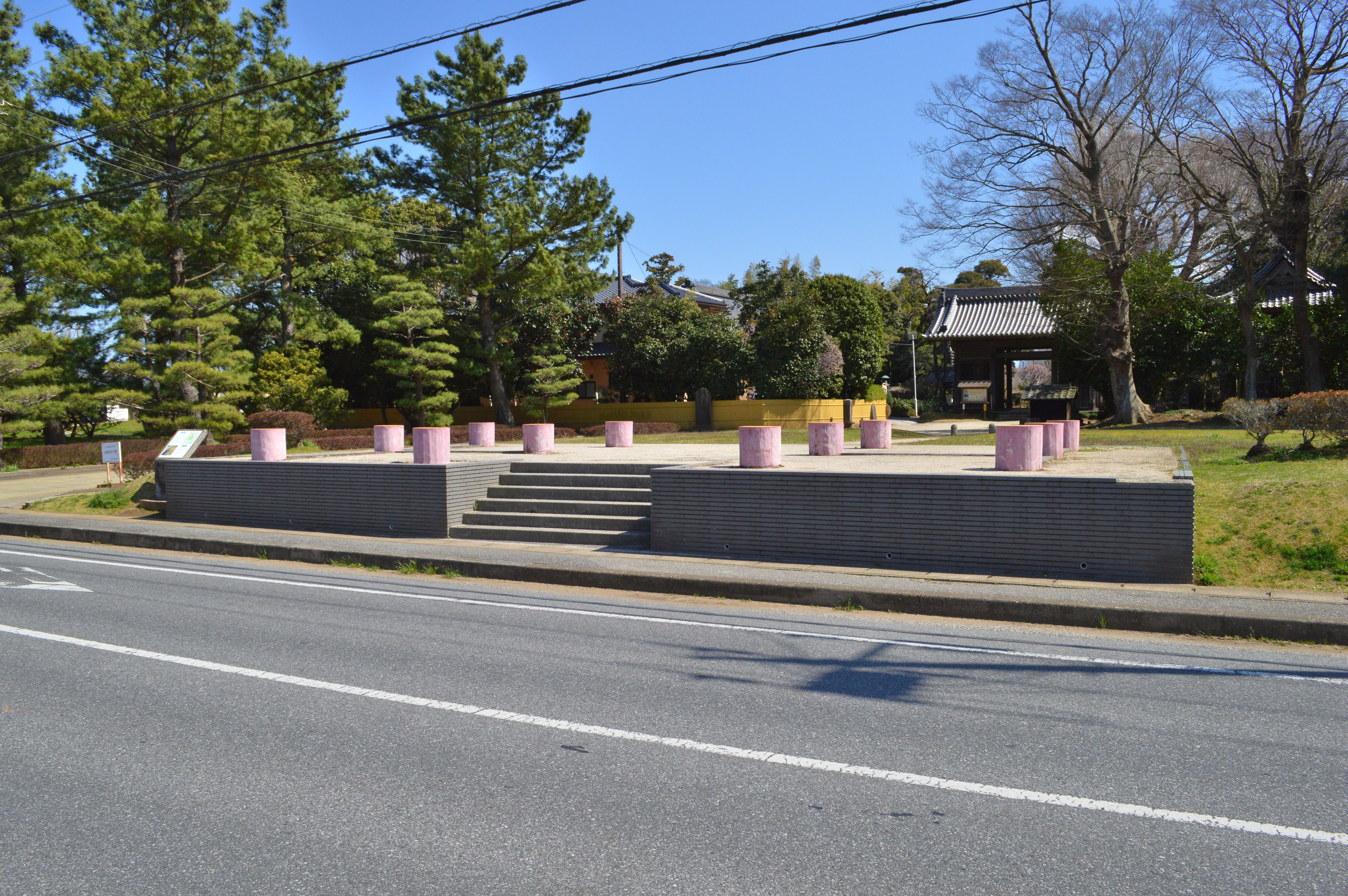
Site of West Gate

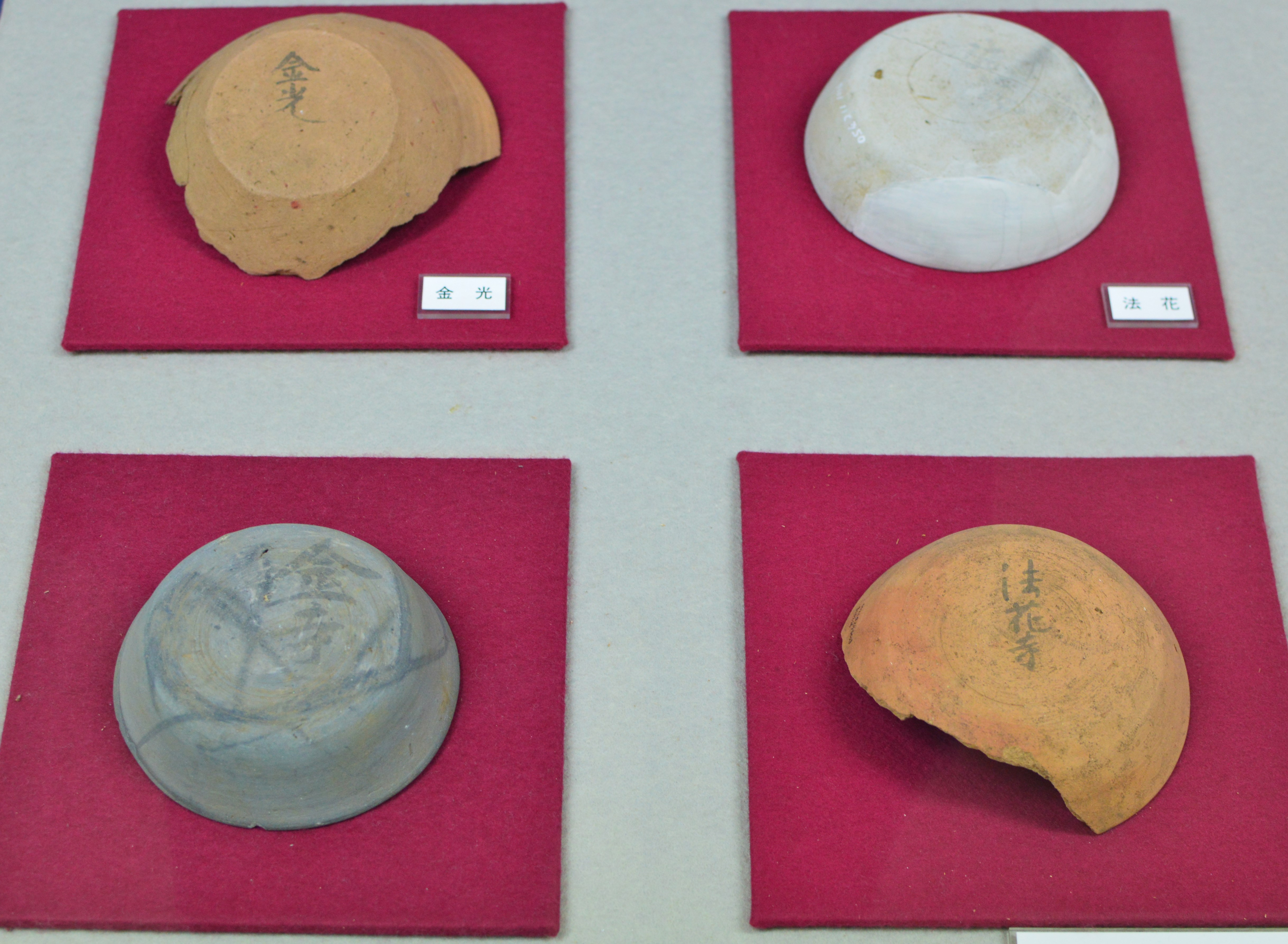
Inscribed pottery shards

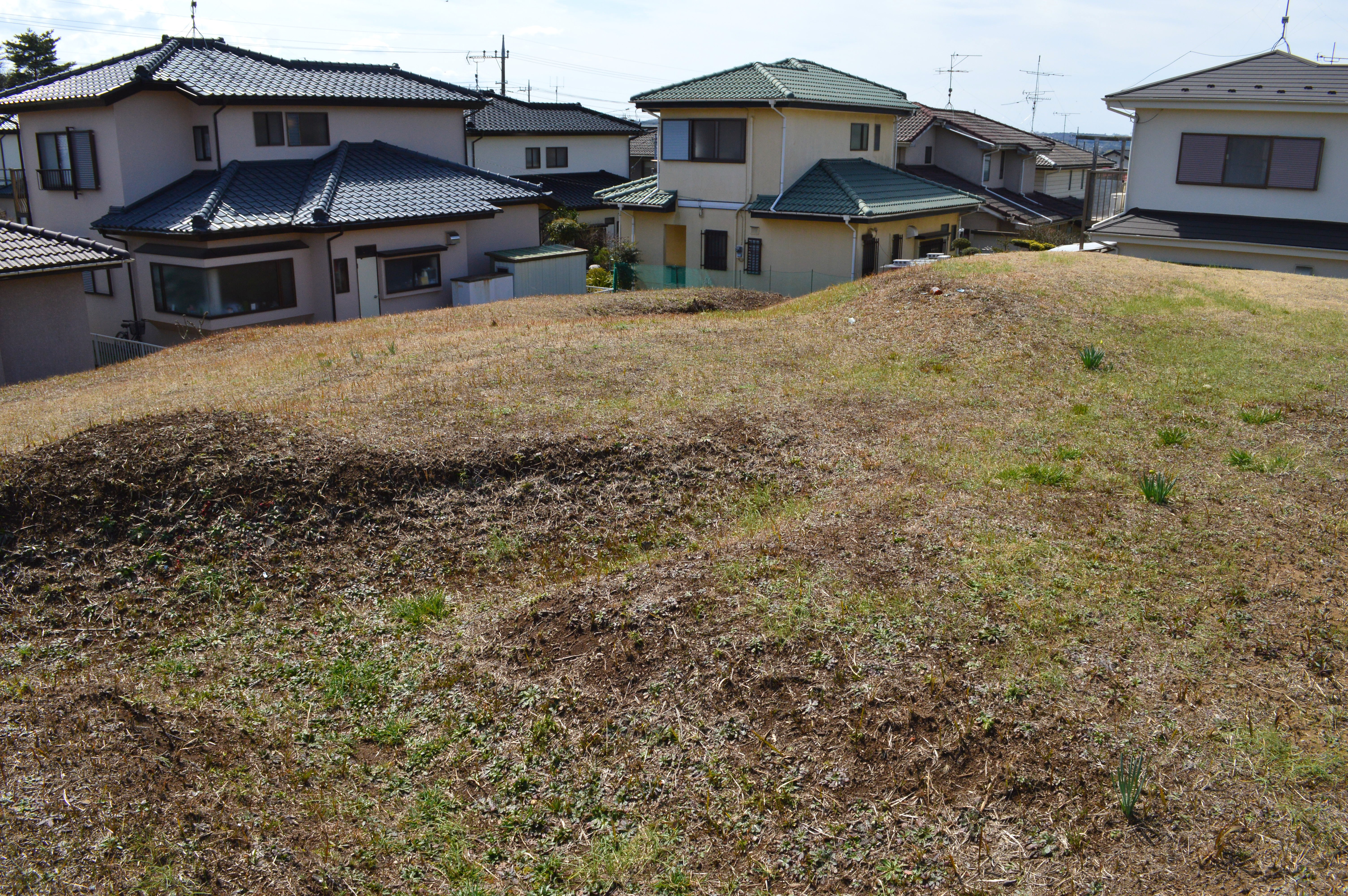
Site of tile kilns

== See also ==
- Provincial temple
- List of Historic Sites of Japan (Chiba)
- Kazusa Kokubun-niji
