= Bōsō Chiran-Ki =

The Bōsō Chiran-Ki (房総治乱記), or "Chronicle of Bōsō at War and Peace", is a minor Japanese medieval text of unknown authorship that chronicles events of the southern part of Kazusa Province of the Bōsō Peninsula in present-day Chiba Prefecture in the late 16th and early 17th centuries.

== Authorship ==
The chronicle has no identifiable author, was probably composed by multiple authors and editors from a variety of sources, and frequently revised over a period of several centuries. The chronicle was, however, probably written by someone with an intimate knowledge of the geography the Bōsō region from the time of the chronicle into the Edo period.

== Composition ==
The chronicle is a regional example of a "gunki monogatari" (軍記物語), or war tale written primarily in the Kamakura and Muromachi periods that focus on wars and conflicts. It consists of one volume, and is arranged in chronological order by event. Its exact time of authorship is also unknown. The Bōsō Chiran-Ki is traditionally dated to the beginning of the Edo period, and was probably started between 1596 and finished as late as the 1660s. The chronicle is generally thought of to be an accurate account of regional conflicts in Kazusa Province, but the veracity of many parts of the account are uncertain. In spite of its many flaws, the document is one of the most important existing document concerning local history of a large part of Chiba Prefecture prior to the Meiji period.

The earliest manuscript of the Bōsō Chiran-Ki dates to 1668 and is now held by the National Archives of Japan. A modern printing of the chronicle was released as part of a long series of source documents of the Bōsō region by the Bōsō Sōsho Kankōkai in 1940.

== Contents ==
The Bōsō Chiran-Ki primarily details the circumstances surrounding local conflicts and the hostilities between regional commanders. It notably records the division, from approximately 1587, of traditional “fudai” fiefdoms from local leaders by the Tokugawa clan, the inevitable demise of the fiefdoms by Hideyoshi Toyotomi after the Siege of Odawara in 1590.

The chronicle especially richly details the conflict between the castle lords of Kazusa Province, specifically:

- Yoritada Masaki, Awa Masaki clan, lord of Katsuura Castle in present-day Katsuura City,
- Yoriharu Toki, Toki clan, lord of Mangi Castle in present-day Isumi City,
- Toyonobu Takeda, Takeda clan, lord of Chōnan Castle in present-day Chonan,
- Yoshiyasu Satomi, Satomi clan, lord of Ōtaki Castle in the present-day town of Ōtaki.

The chronicle also describes the devastating Kazusa earthquake of 1601. It ends with an account of Rodrigo de Vivero. Rodrigo, a Spanish noble and governor-elect to the Philippines, was shipwrecked off the Pacific Ocean coast of the Bōsō Peninsula in present-day Onjuku in 1609, visited Ōtaki Castle and the capitol Edo.
