= Kazusa Kokubunni-ji =

Buddhist nunnery ruins in Chiba, Japan

Kazusa Kokubun-niji
- 上総国分尼寺
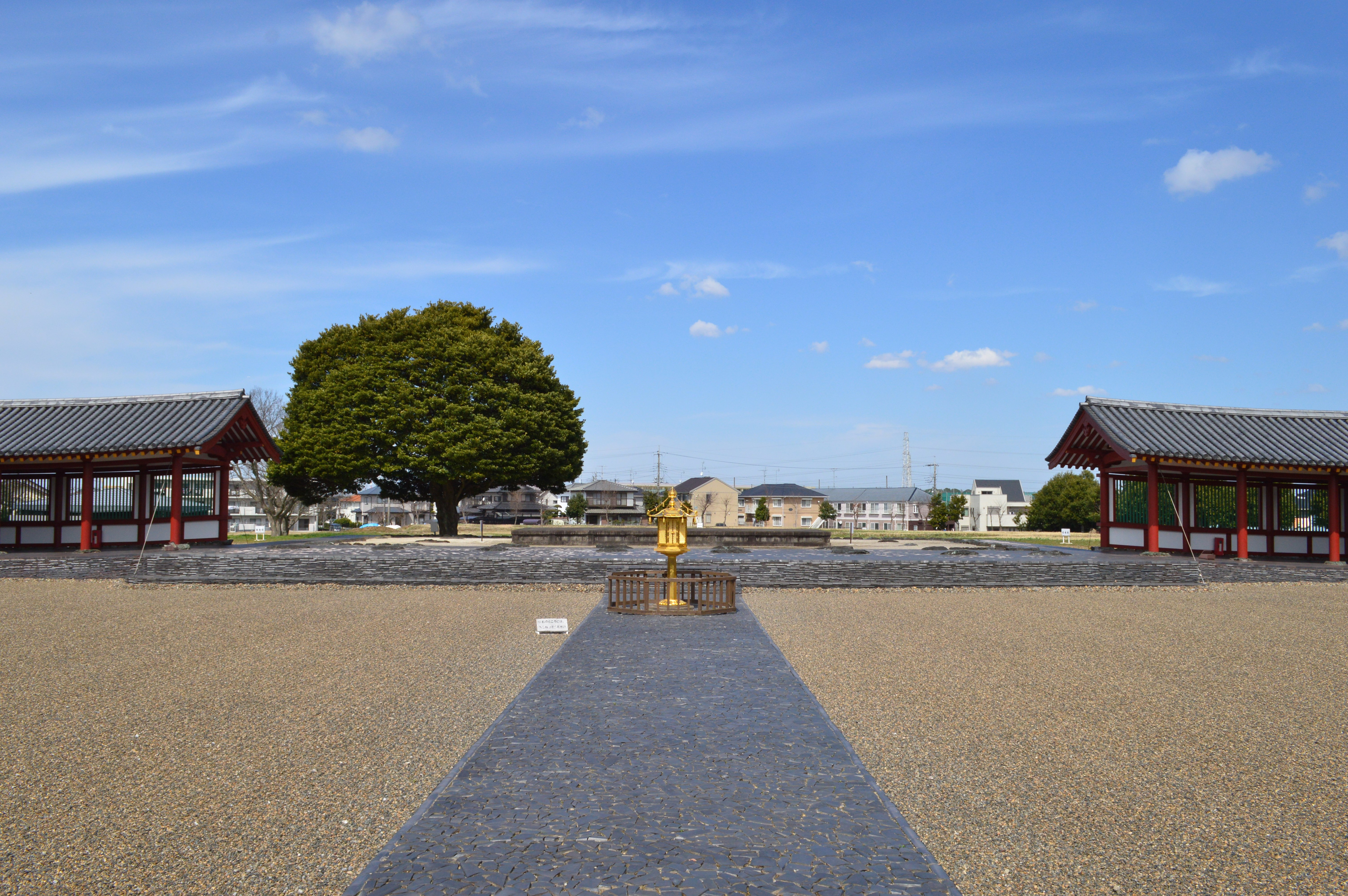
- Kazusa Kokubun-niji Kondō site

- Location within Chiba Prefecture Location within Japan

Religion
- Affiliation: Buddhist
- Status: ruins

Location
- Location: Ichihara, Chiba
- Country: Japan
- Interactive map of Kazusa Kokubun-niji
- Coordinates: 35°30′01″N 140°07′05″E

Architecture
- Founder: Emperor Shōmu
- Completed: 741AD

The Kazusa Kokubun-niji (上総国分尼寺跡) is the ruins of a Buddhist nunnery located in the city of Ichihara, Chiba, Japan, which was part of the provincial temple complex ("kokubunji") of former Kazusa Province.The temple ruins were designated a National Historic Site in 1983, with the area under protection expanded in 1985.

== Overview ==
The Shoku Nihongi records that in 741, as the country recovered from a major smallpox epidemic, Emperor Shōmu ordered that a monastery and nunnery be established in every province, the kokubunji (国分寺).

The Kazusa Kokubun-niji was located on the northern bank of the Yōrō River, in an area with a high concentration of kofun and ancient sites, and is separated from the Kazusa Kokubun-ji, which was located a short distance to the southwest, by a shallow valley. After several archaeological excavations starting in 1948, the layout of the temple was confirmed. The total area of the temple complex was 372 meters (1,220 ft) north-to-south by 285 meters (935 ft) east-to-west, for a total area of 123,000 square meters (1,320,000 sq ft), making it the largest nunnery in the kokubunji system yet discovered. The central enclosure, containing the main structures of the nunnery, measured 200 meters (660 ft) north-to-south by 170 meters (560 ft) east-to-west. The foundation stones for the South Gate, Middle Gate, Kondō, Lecture Hall, Cloisters, bell tower, sutra tower, and the residential building for the nuns have been found. In addition, there are traces of a metal workshop, medicinal plants garden and infirmary. In 1996 the Middle Gate and part of the Cloister were restored, and a museum (the Kazusa Kokubunnji Temple Ruins Exhibition Hall (上総国分尼寺跡展示館, Kazusa kokubuniji-ato tenji-kan) was built on the site to display various artifacts that have been unearthed. It also contains a large diorama showing how the temple complex may originally have looked. The site is a ten-minute walk from the Ichihara City Hall bus stop on the Kominato Railway Bus from Goi Station on the JR East Uchibo Line.

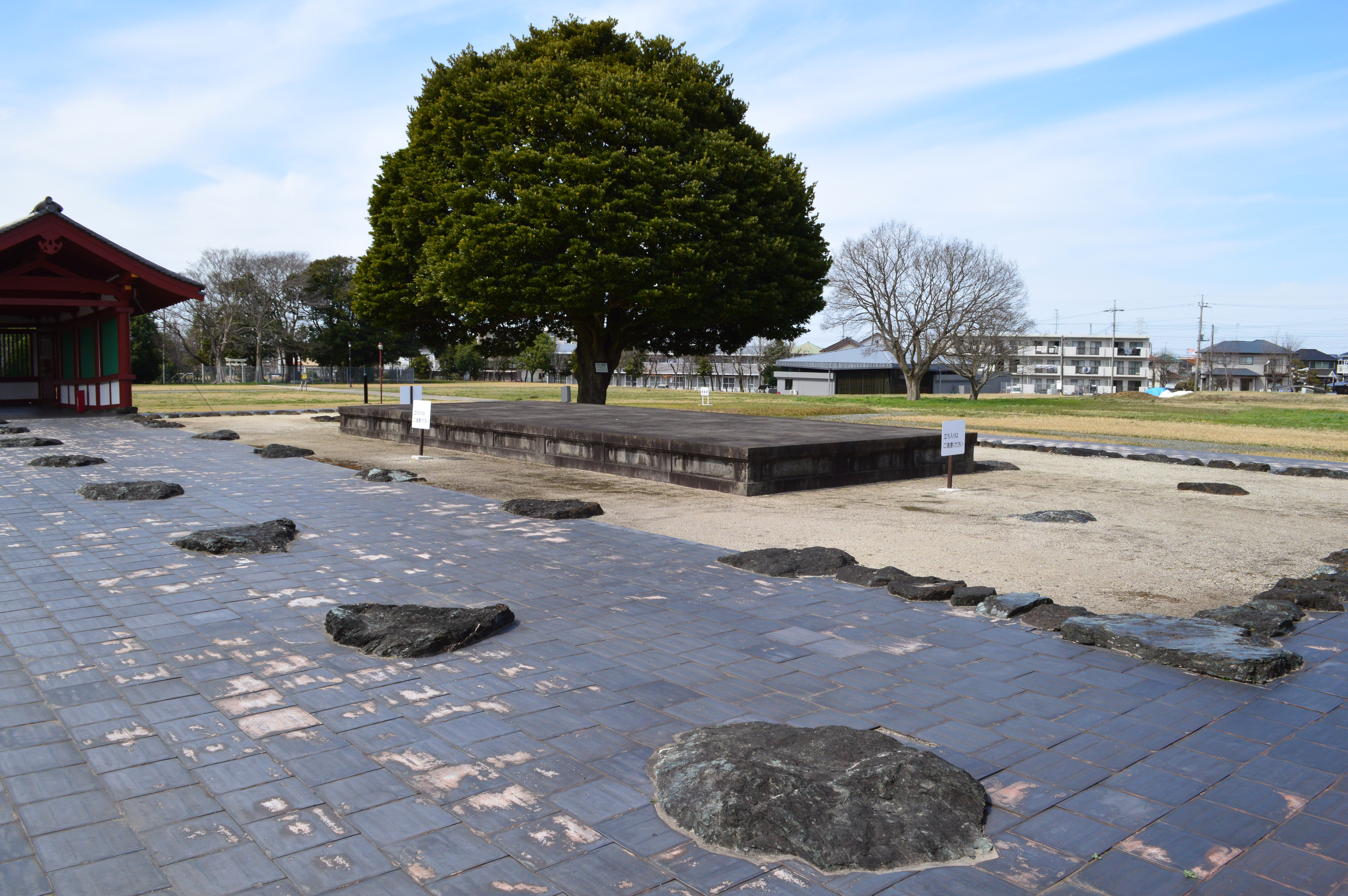
Site of Kondō

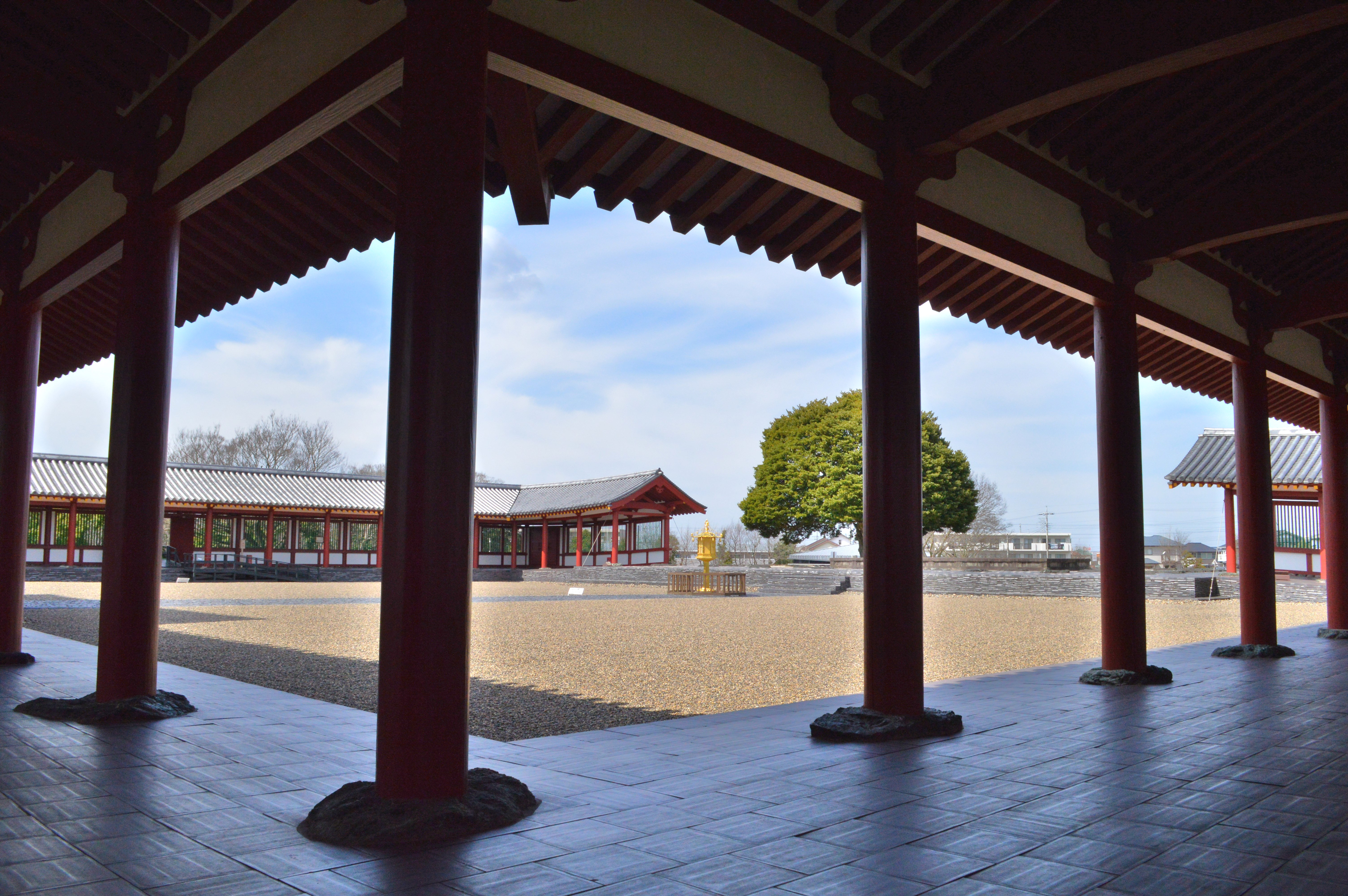
Restored Cloisters

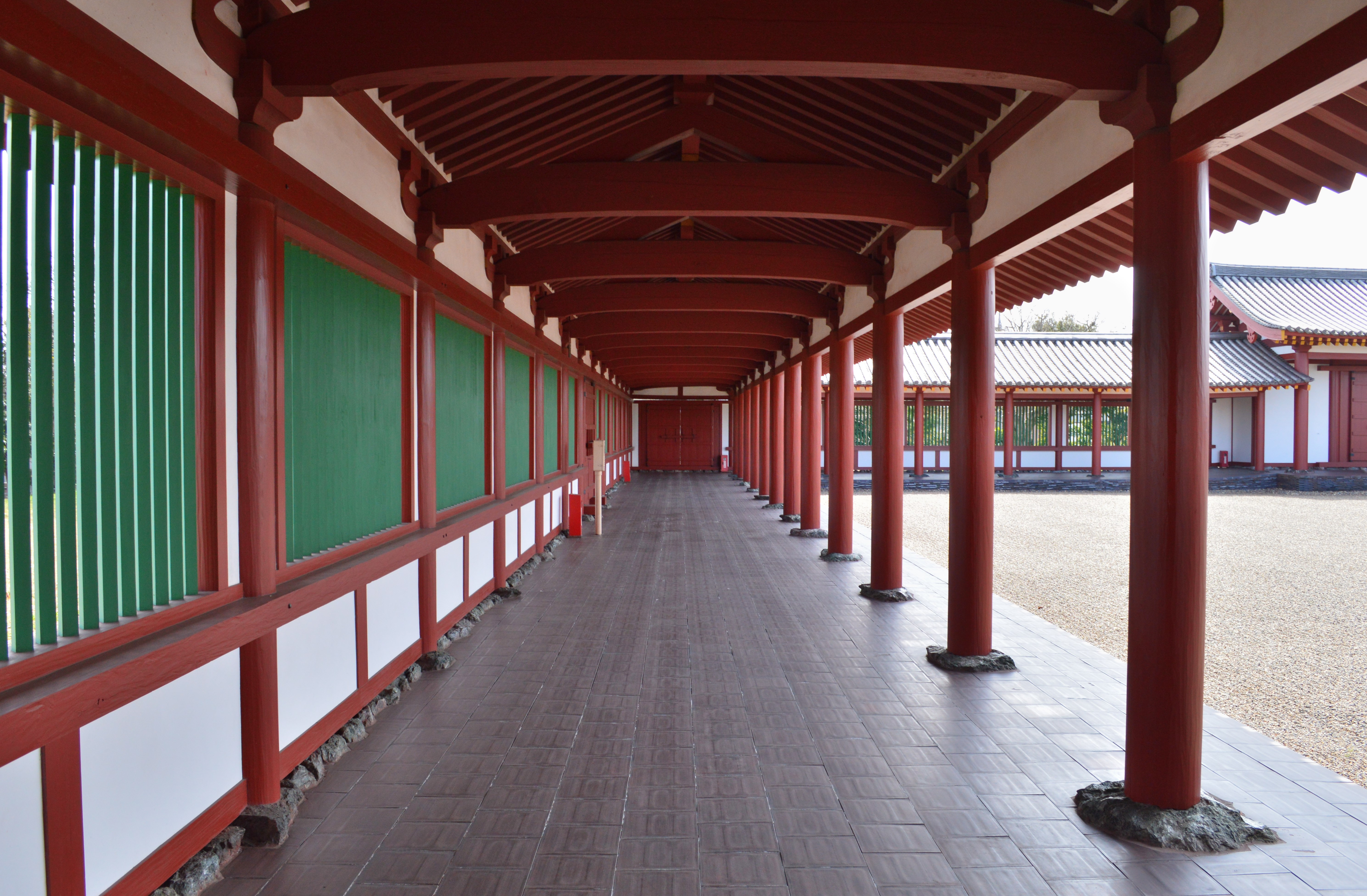
Cloisters, interior

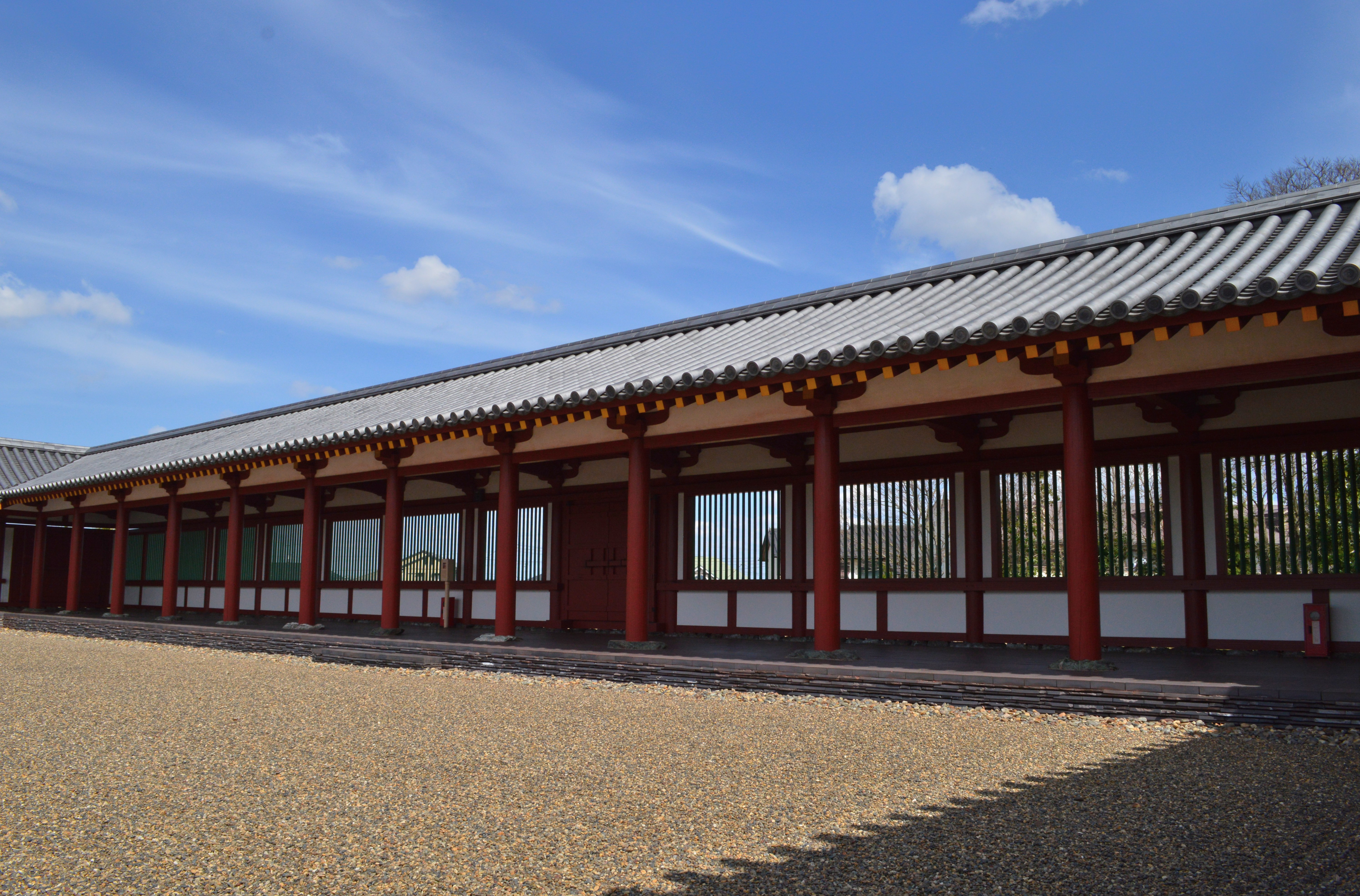
Cloisters, exterior

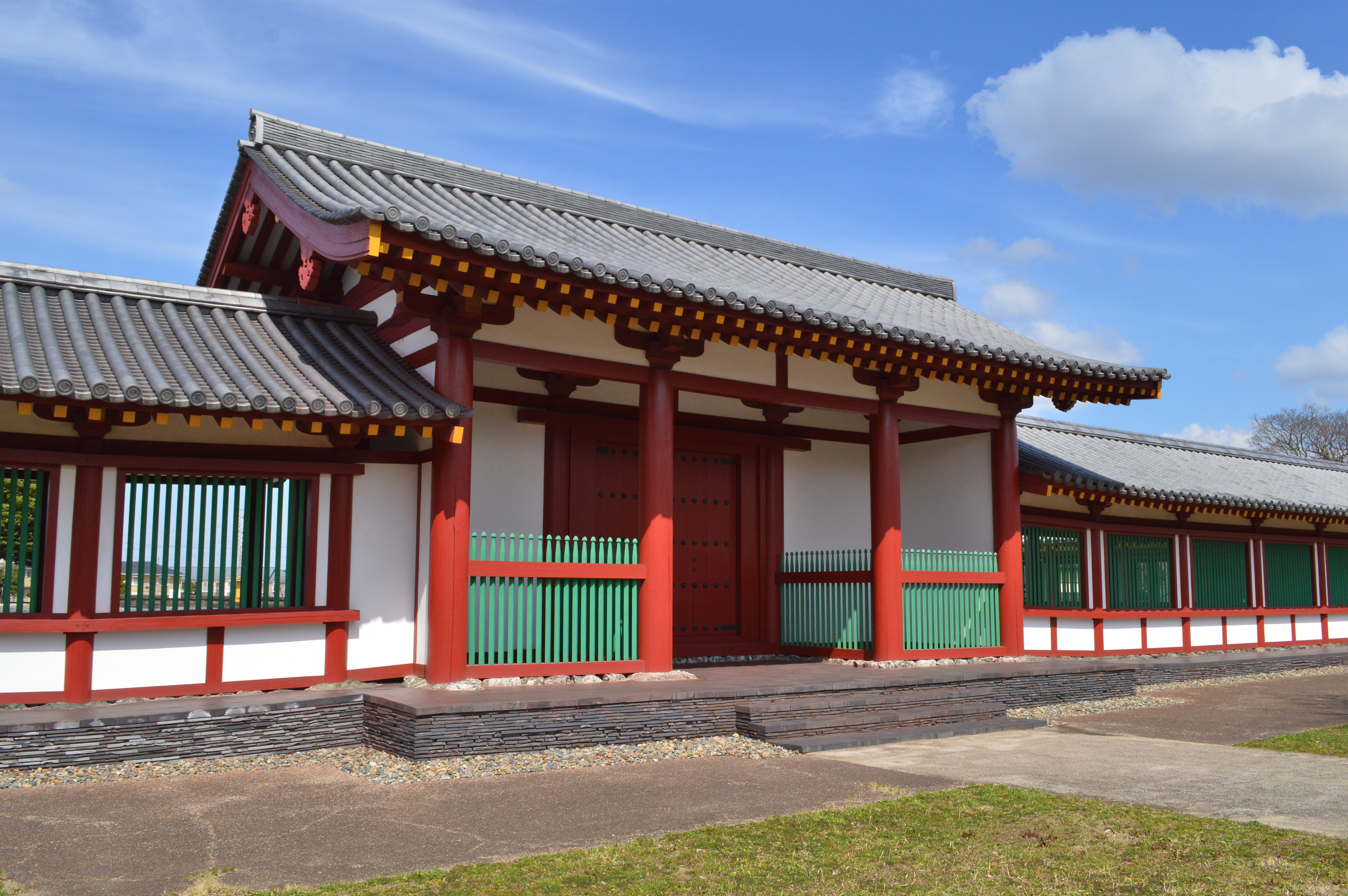
Restored Middle Gate

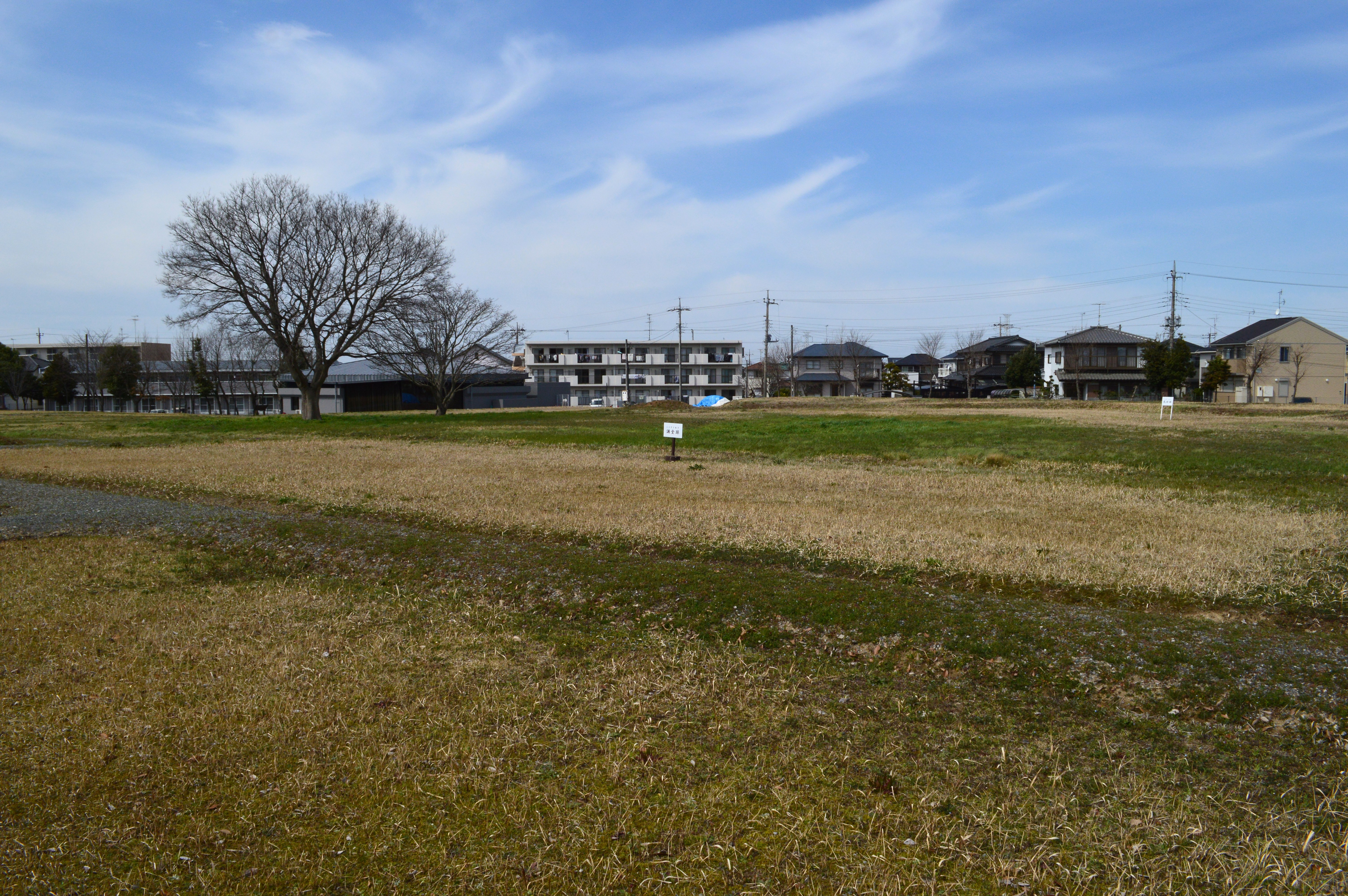
Site of Lecture Hall

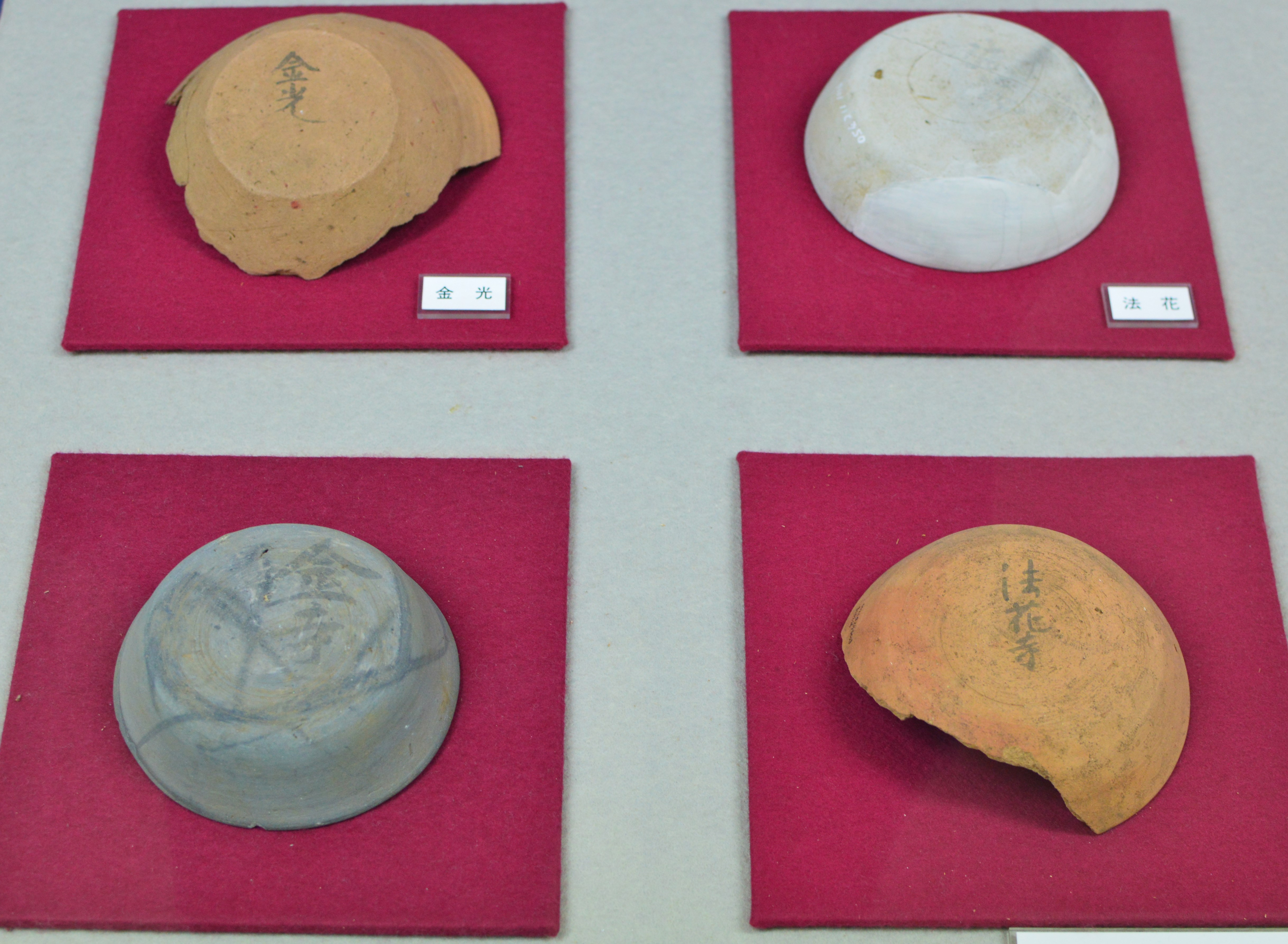
Excavated artifacts

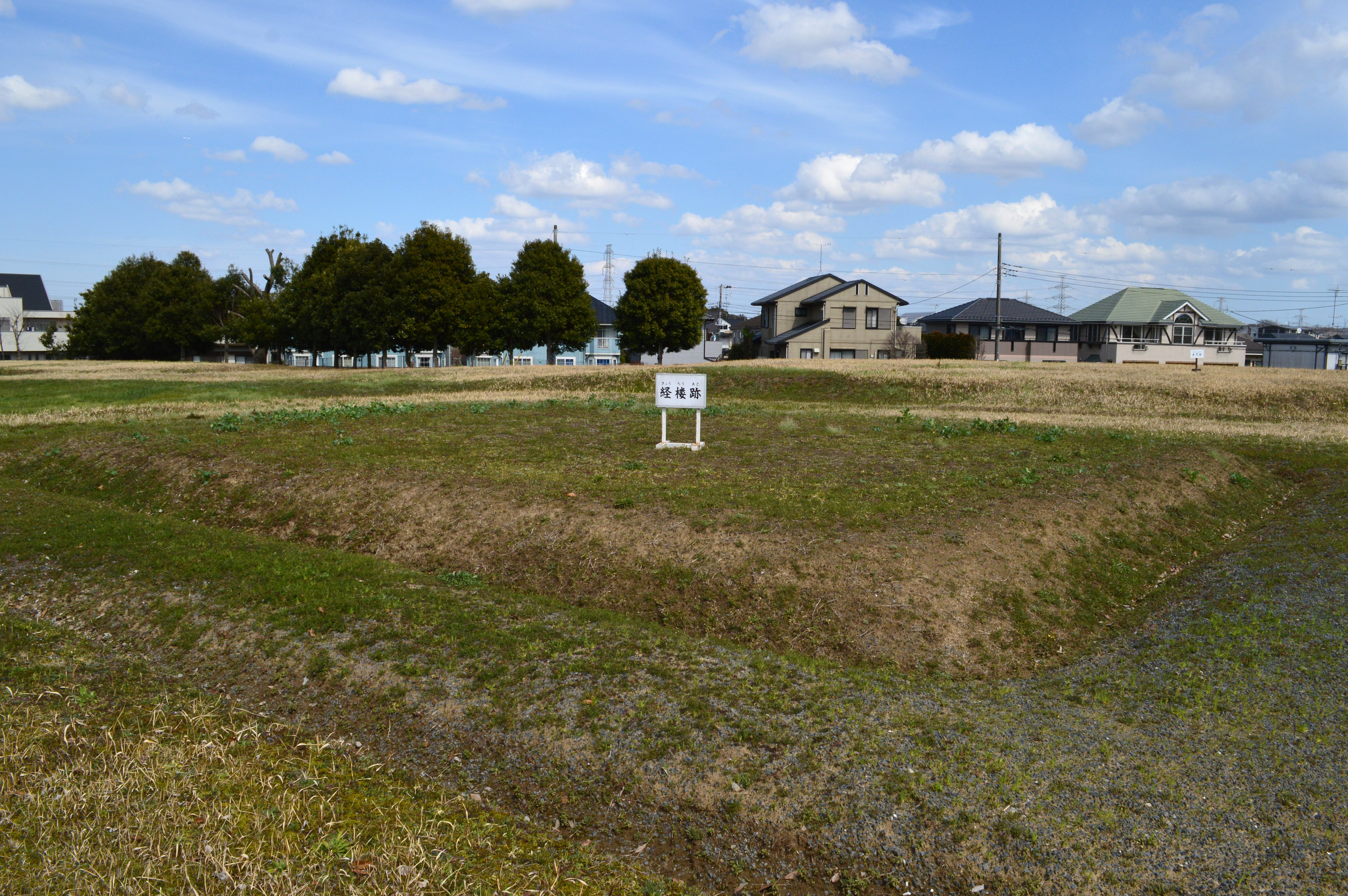
Site of Sutra Tower

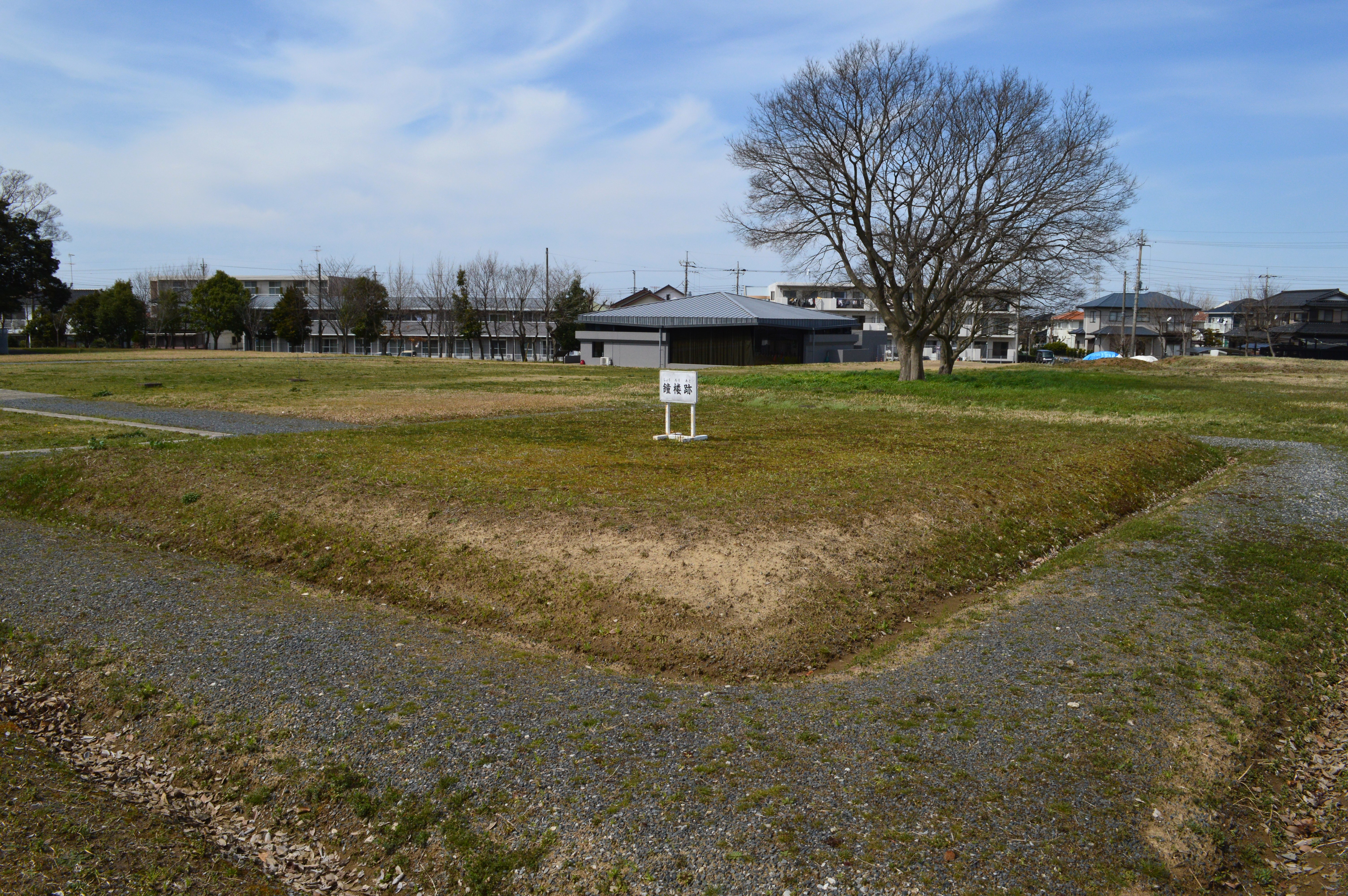
Site of Bell Tower

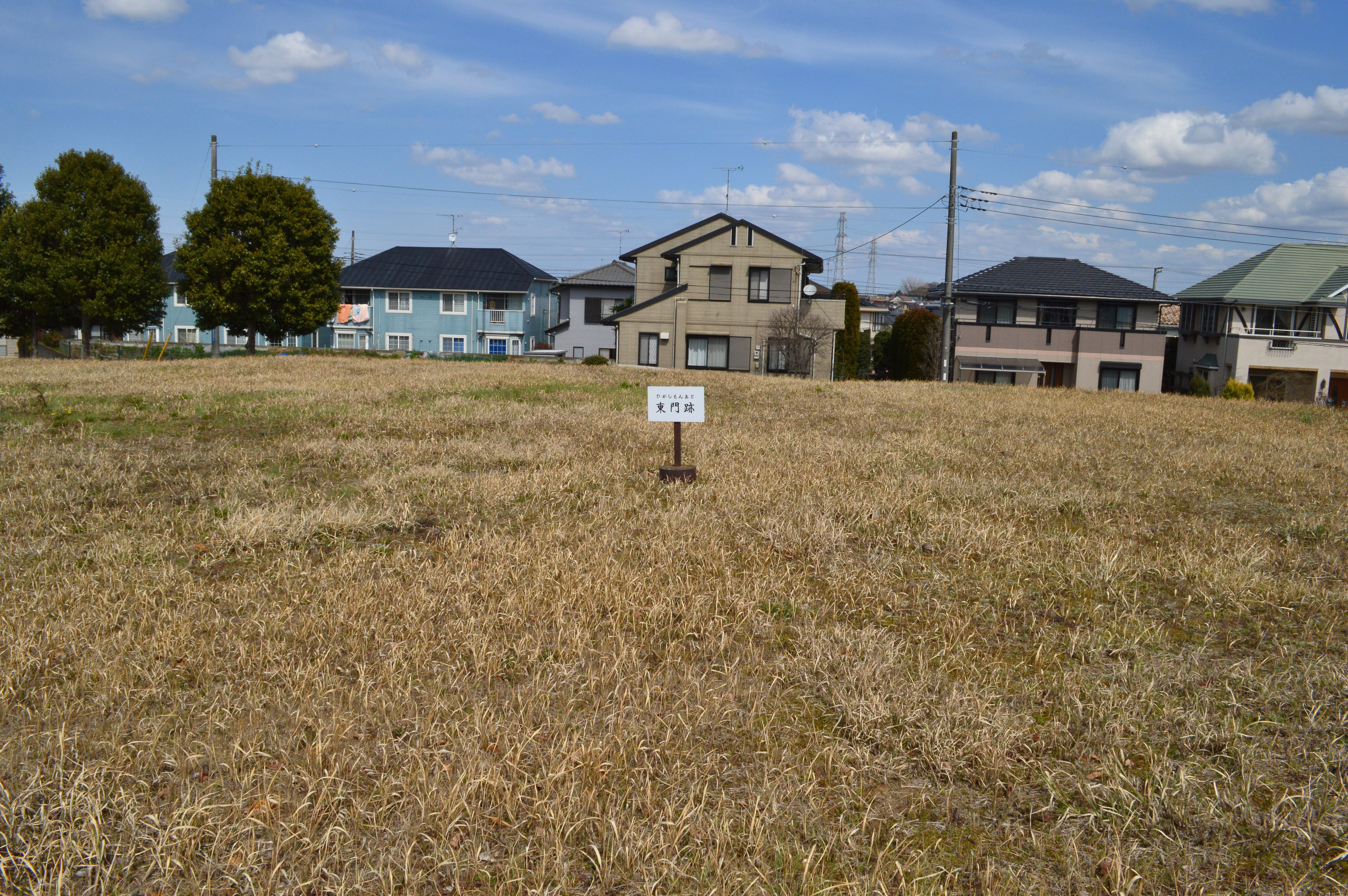
Site of East Gate

== See also ==
- Provincial temple
- List of Historic Sites of Japan (Chiba)
