= Ryōgen-ji =

Buddhist temple in Chiba Prefecture, Japan

Coordinates: 35°16′44.87″N 140°14′43.12″E

Ryōgen-ji 良玄寺
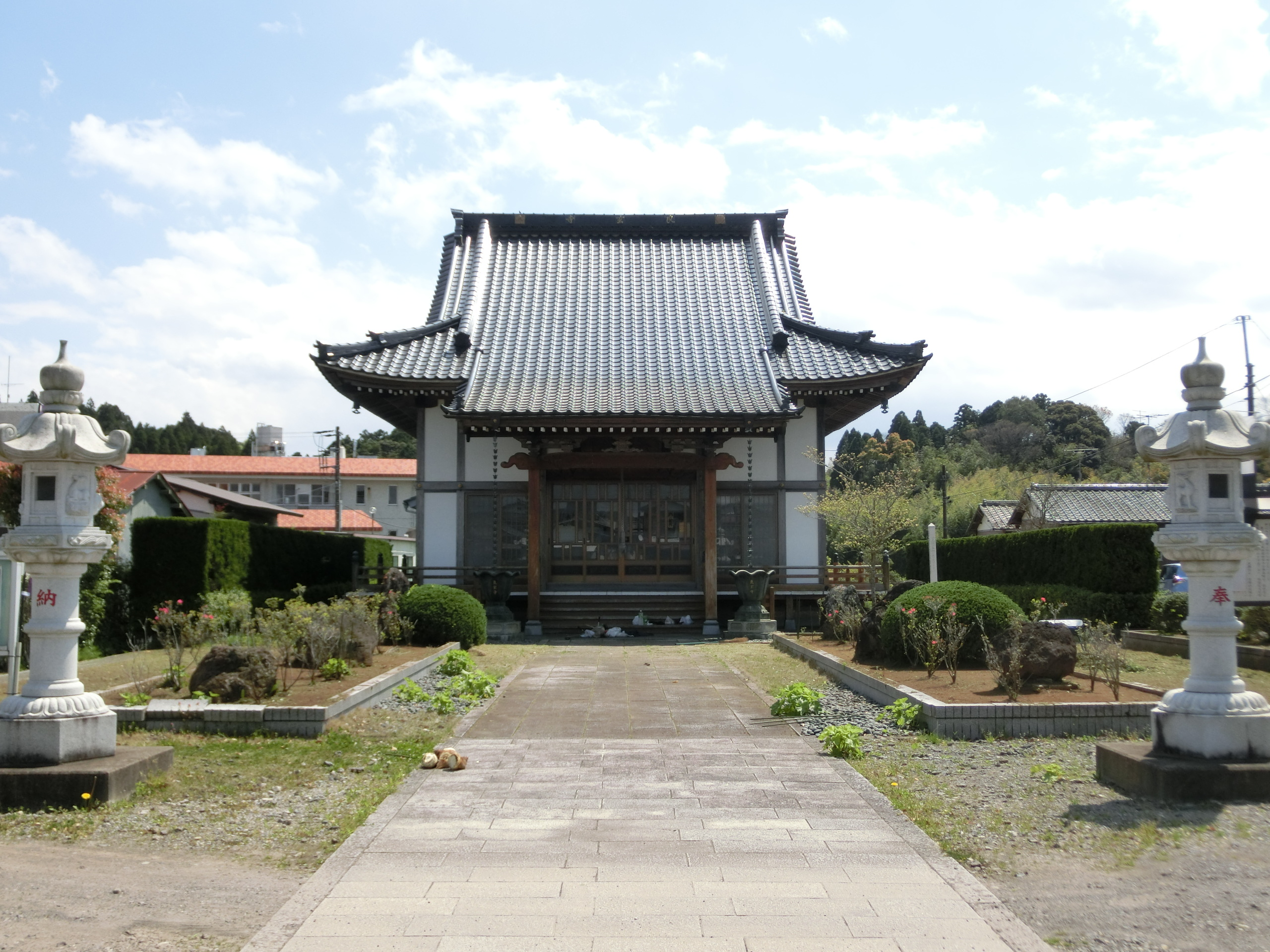

Religion
- Affiliation: Jōdo-shū
- Deity: Amida Sanzon

Location
- Location: 180 Shinmachi, Ōtaki, Isumi District, Chiba Prefecture
- Country: Japan
- Interactive map of Ryōgen-ji 良玄寺

Architecture
- Founder: Honda Tadakatsu
- Completed: 1595

Website
- Official home page (Japanese)

Ryōgen-ji (良玄寺) is a Buddhist temple located in the town of Ōtaki in Chiba Prefecture, Japan. It is closely associated with Honda Tadakatsu, a daimyō of the late Sengoku through early Edo period loyal to Tokugawa Ieyasu.

== Construction ==
The temple was built in 1595 by Tadakatsu. Ieyasu granted Honda Tadakatsu the Ōtaki Domain, and he constructed the jōkamachi, or castle town, of Ōtaki Castle. Tadakatsu placed the temple in a strategically defensive position in the Shinmachi District above the Isumi River to protect the castle town from the south. The temple was originally called Ryōshin-ji (良心寺) but was renamed Ryōgen-ji, the name by which it is known today, after the death of Honda Tadakatsu.

== Cultural objects ==
100 meters (330 ft) to the west of the Kondō, or main hall of the temple, is a grave site dedicated to Honda Tadakatsu, his wife, and younger son Honda Tadatomo. The three tombstones, in the shape of 1 meter (3 ft)-high pagodas, exist to this day: Tadakatsu's in the middle, his wife's to the right, and Tadatomo's to the left. The grave site was constructed to face due north towards a full view of Ōtaki Castle. The temple currently houses a wealth of items related to Honda Tadakatsu and the Honda clan, including his portrait, Buddhist mortuary tablet, and numerous archival documents of the period.
