= Myōhōshō-ji =

Buddhist temple in Chiba Prefecture, Japan

Coordinates: 35°10′28.6″N 140°10′00.72″E

Myōhōshō-ji 妙法生寺
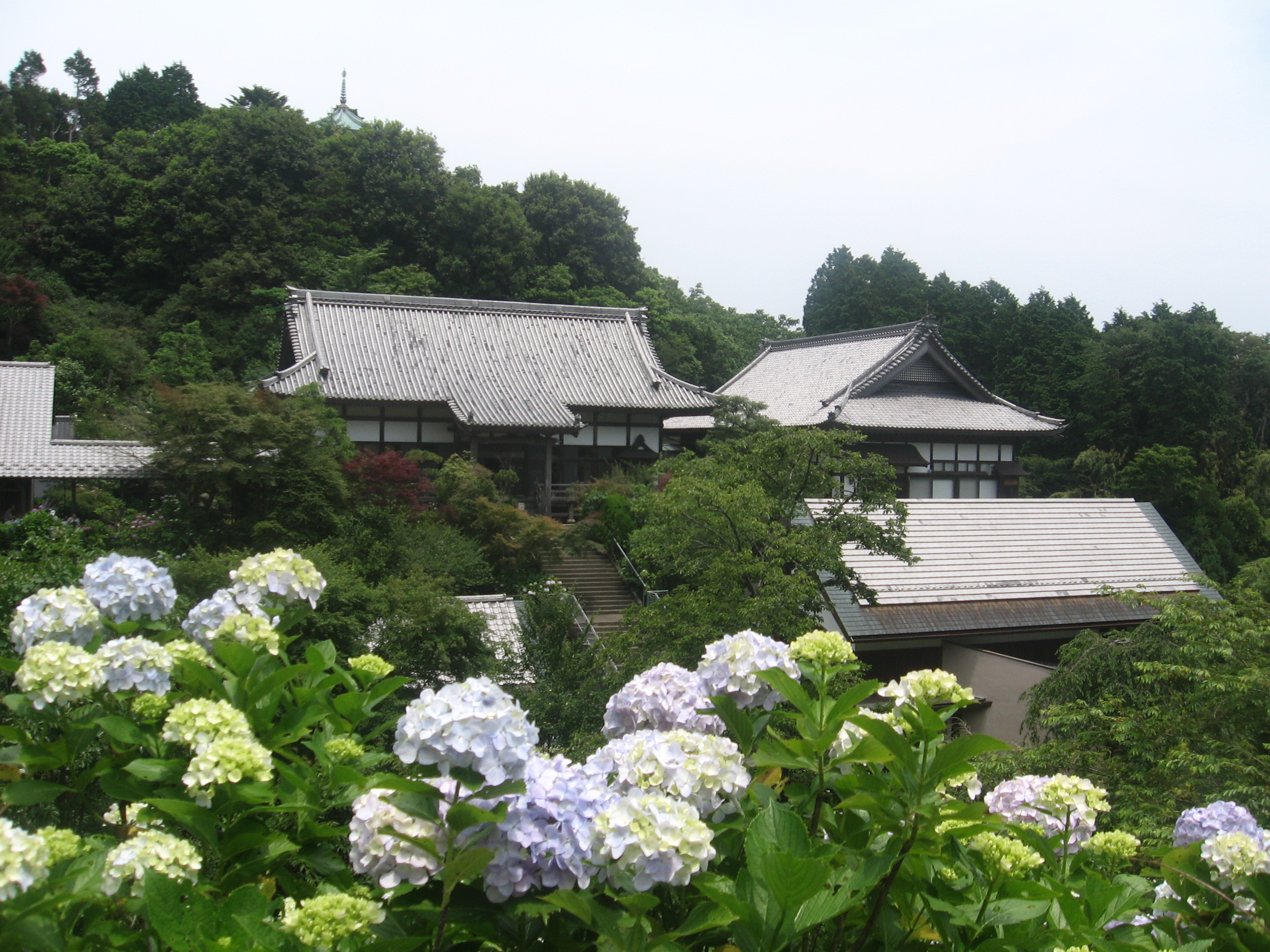
- Hydrangea of Myōhōshō-ji

Religion
- Affiliation: Nichiren Buddhism

Location
- Location: 1749 Tsutsumori, Ōtaki, Chiba Prefecture
- Country: Japan
- Interactive map of Myōhōshō-ji 妙法生寺

Myōhōshō-ji (妙法生寺) is a Buddhist temple located in the town of Ōtaki in Chiba Prefecture, and is a temple of the Nichiren sect. The temple was given its name in 1253, and is a reference to the opening line of the Lotus Sutra. Myōhōshō-ji is located deep in the Bōsō Hill Range in the center of the Bōsō Peninsula. The temple had fallen into nearly complete ruin by 1904, but was slowly rebuilt starting in 1931 by Nichiren Buddhists.

== Hydrangea plantings ==
Myōhōshō-ji is a popular tourist destination as a result of being an "ajisai-dera", or hydrangea temples. Since 1951 the temple has planted and maintained 20,000 hydrangea bushes as part of a prayer garden, which are in blossom during the month of August. The garden is also well known for its himeharu cicadia population. Myōhōshō-ji is a popular destination to watch the first sunrise on New Year's Day.

== Transportation ==
Myōhōshō-ji is not accessible by public transportation, but is located an hour's drive from Japan National Route 297 between Tateyama and Ichihara.
