= Saniku Gakuin College =

Private university in Japan

Coordinates: 35°14′30″N 140°15′48″E

- 三育学院大学
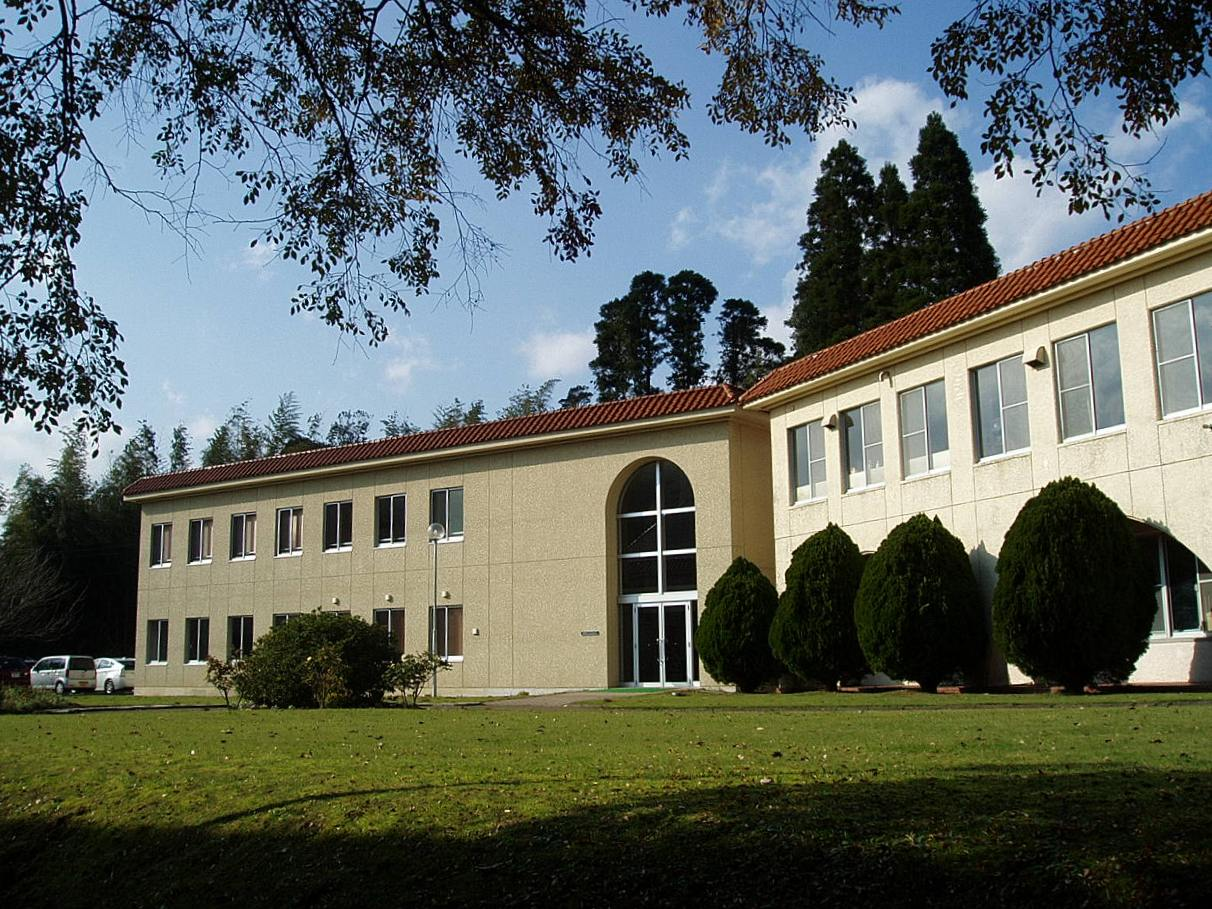
- Motto: To Make People Whole Through Christ's Love
- Type: Private
- Established: Founded 1898; Chartered 2008
- President: Katsumi Higashide
- Academic staff: 40 (May 2012)
- Administrative staff: 22 (May 2012)
- Students: 210 (May 2012)
- Location: Ōtaki, Chiba Prefecture, Japan
- Campus: Suburb
- Website: www.saniku.ac.jp

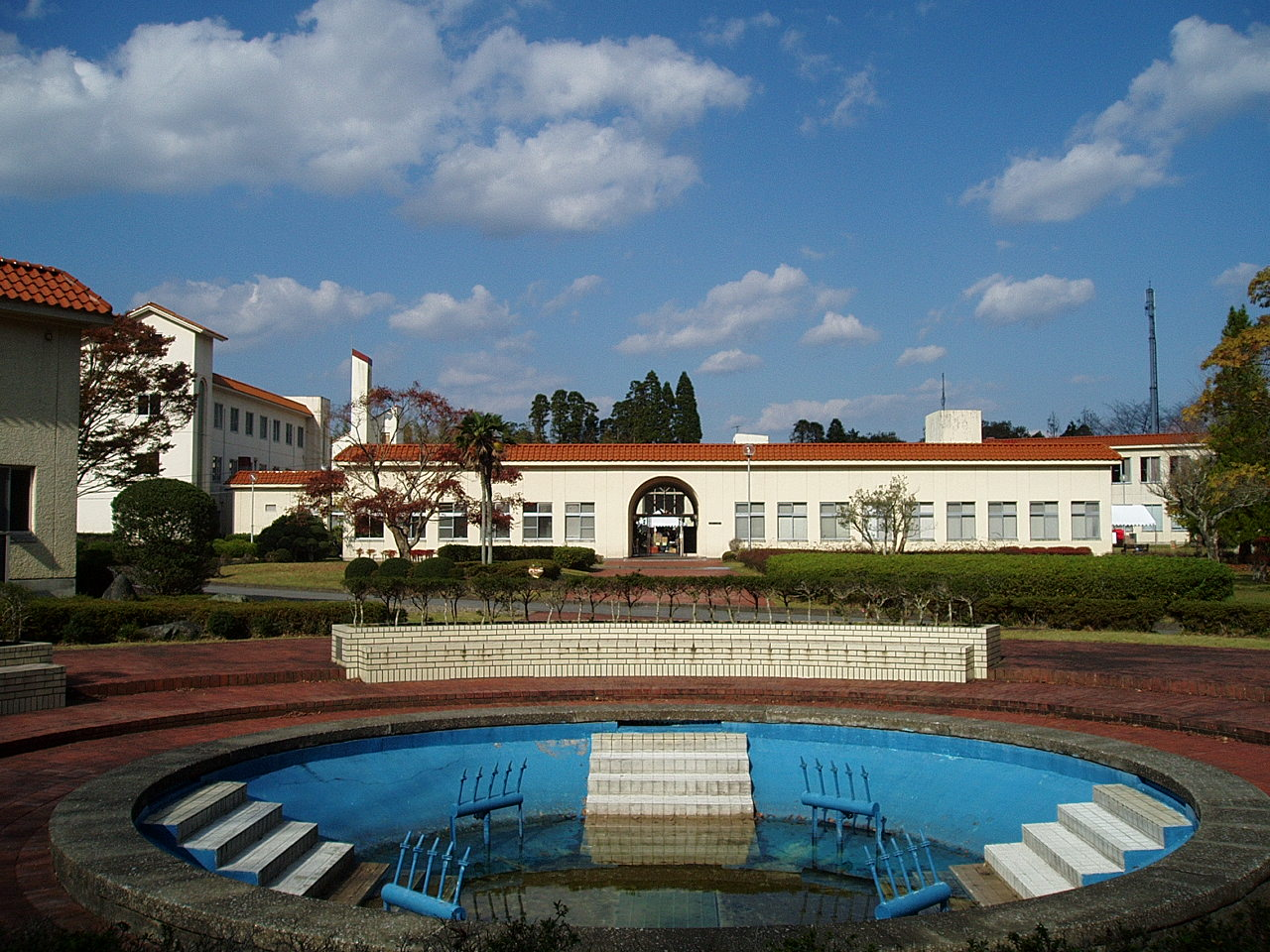
Main buildings and the baptismal pool at Otaki campus

Saniku Gakuin College (三育学院大学, San'iku gakuin daigaku) is a co-educational, Christian, private university in Japan. The main campus is located in Ōtaki, Chiba, Japan. The college is a part of the world-wide network of Seventh-day Adventist Church (SDA) institutions of higher education, the world's second largest Christian school system.

== History ==
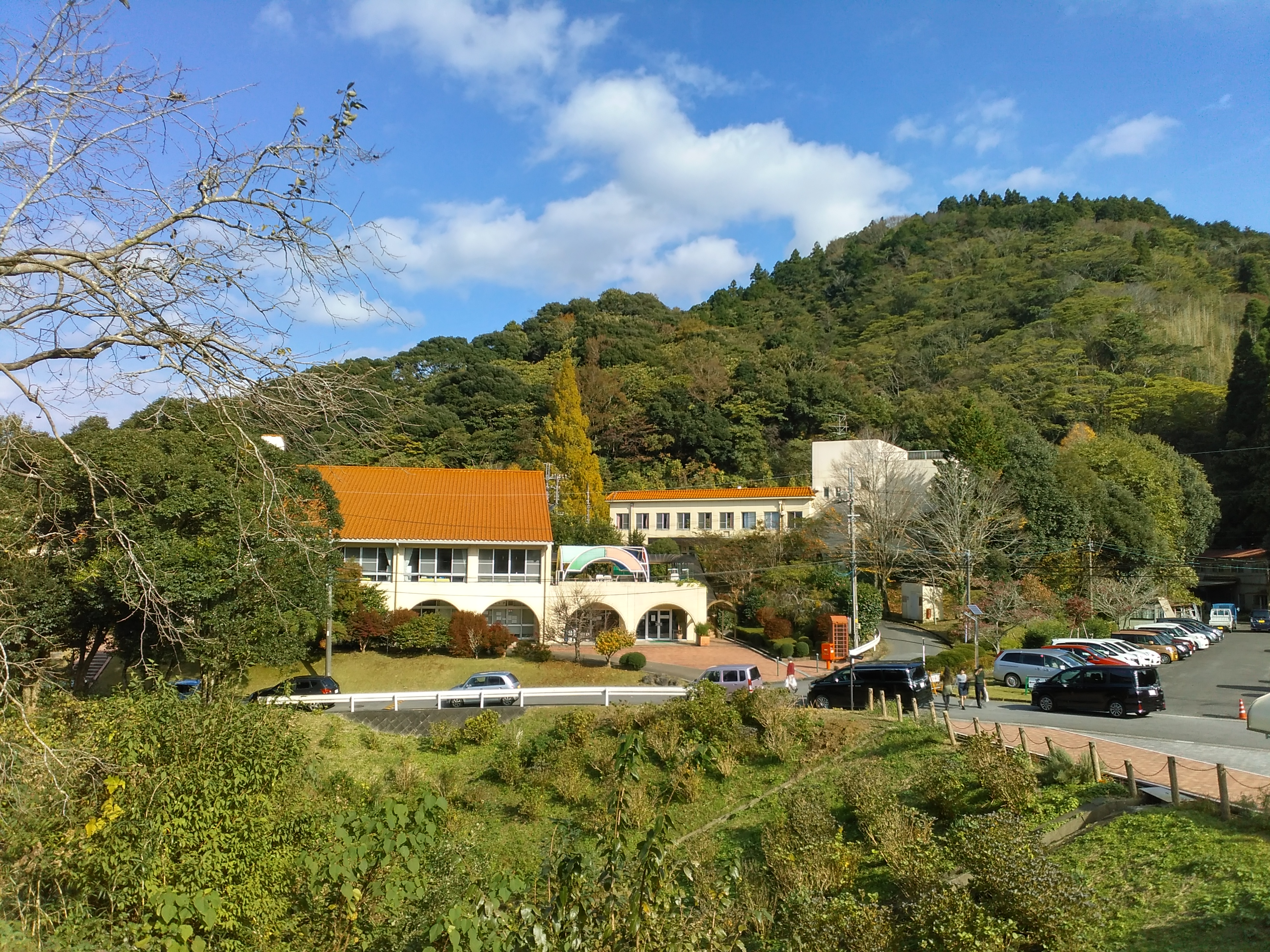
Cafeteria

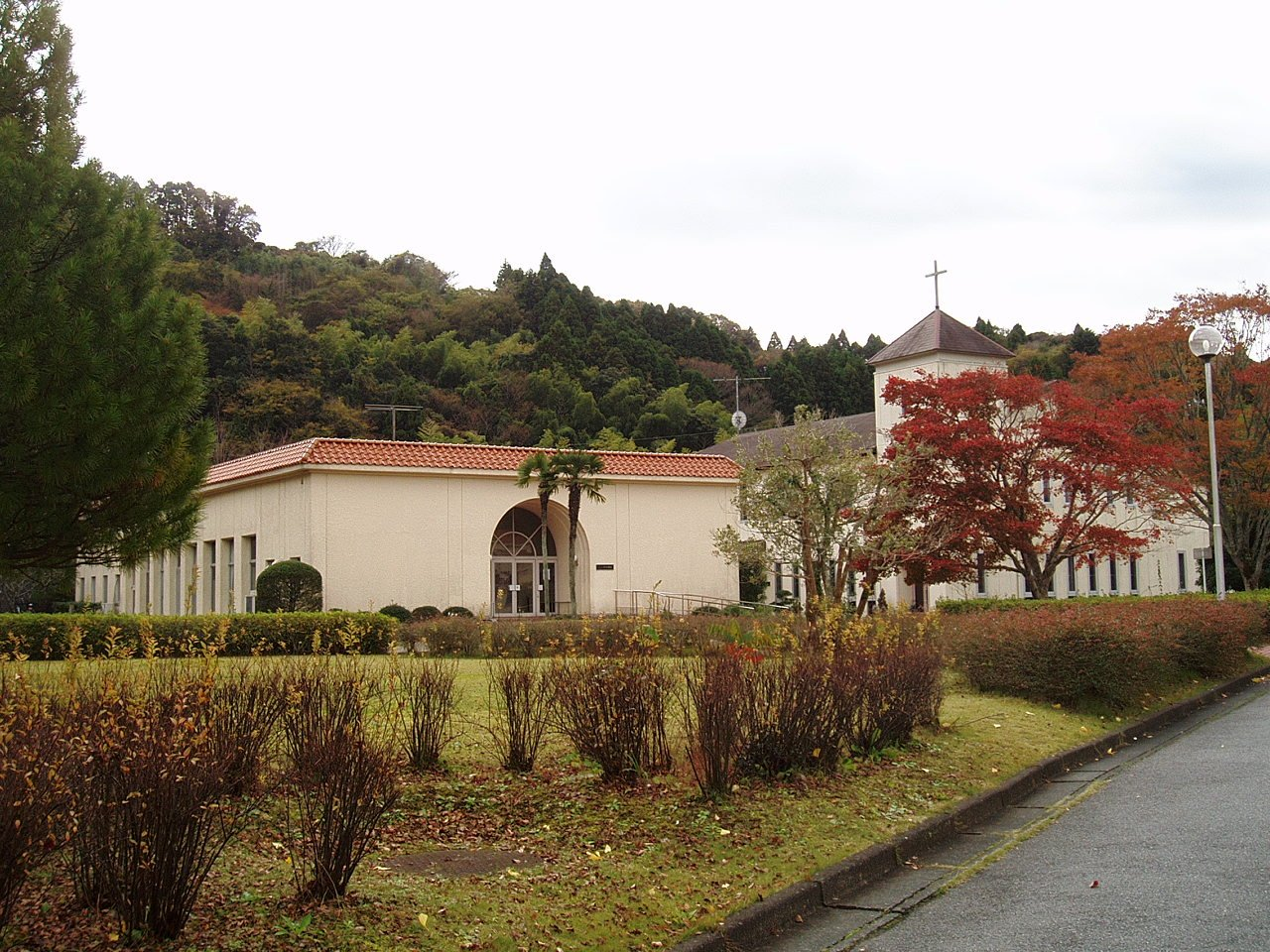
Grainger Memorial Auditorium (left) & Teruhiko Okohira Memorial Hall (right)

The history of the college began in 1898 when William C. Grainger, an SDA missionary, founded Shiba Bible School (芝和英聖書学校, Shiba waei seisho gakkō) in Azabu, Tokyo. In 1914 the school was moved to Suginami and renamed Amanuma Gakuin. In 1926 the school was moved to Sodegaura, Chiba and renamed Nihon San’iku Gakuin. The name San’iku (三育), combination of 三 (san, 'three') and 育 (iku, 'to nourish, to bring up'), means 'to make people whole' in physical (corpus), intellectual (mens) and spiritual (spiritus) attributes.

In 1943, during World War II, the school was forcibly closed. The school was resumed in 1947 after the war. In 1971 the school foundation established Saniku Gakuin Junior College with one department (Department of English Language). In 1978 the college was moved to the present Otaki Campus. In 1987 the college added the Department of Nursing, which became a four-year college in 2008.

== Organization ==
As of April 2012, the university has no graduate schools.

=== Undergraduate schools ===
- Faculty of Nursing

The students study at Otaki Campus during their first 2.5 years, then move to the Tokyo Campus next to the Tokyo Adventist Hospital in Suginami. After a one-year clinical study in Tokyo, they move to Otaki Campus again.

=== Affiliated schools ===
- Saniku Gakuin Junior College
  - Department of English Communications
- Saniku Gakuin College (technical college)
  - Department of Theology
  - Department of Christian Education

== See also ==
- List of Seventh-day Adventist colleges and universities
- Seventh-day Adventist education
