= Ōtaki, Chiba =

Ōtaki 大多喜町
- Town
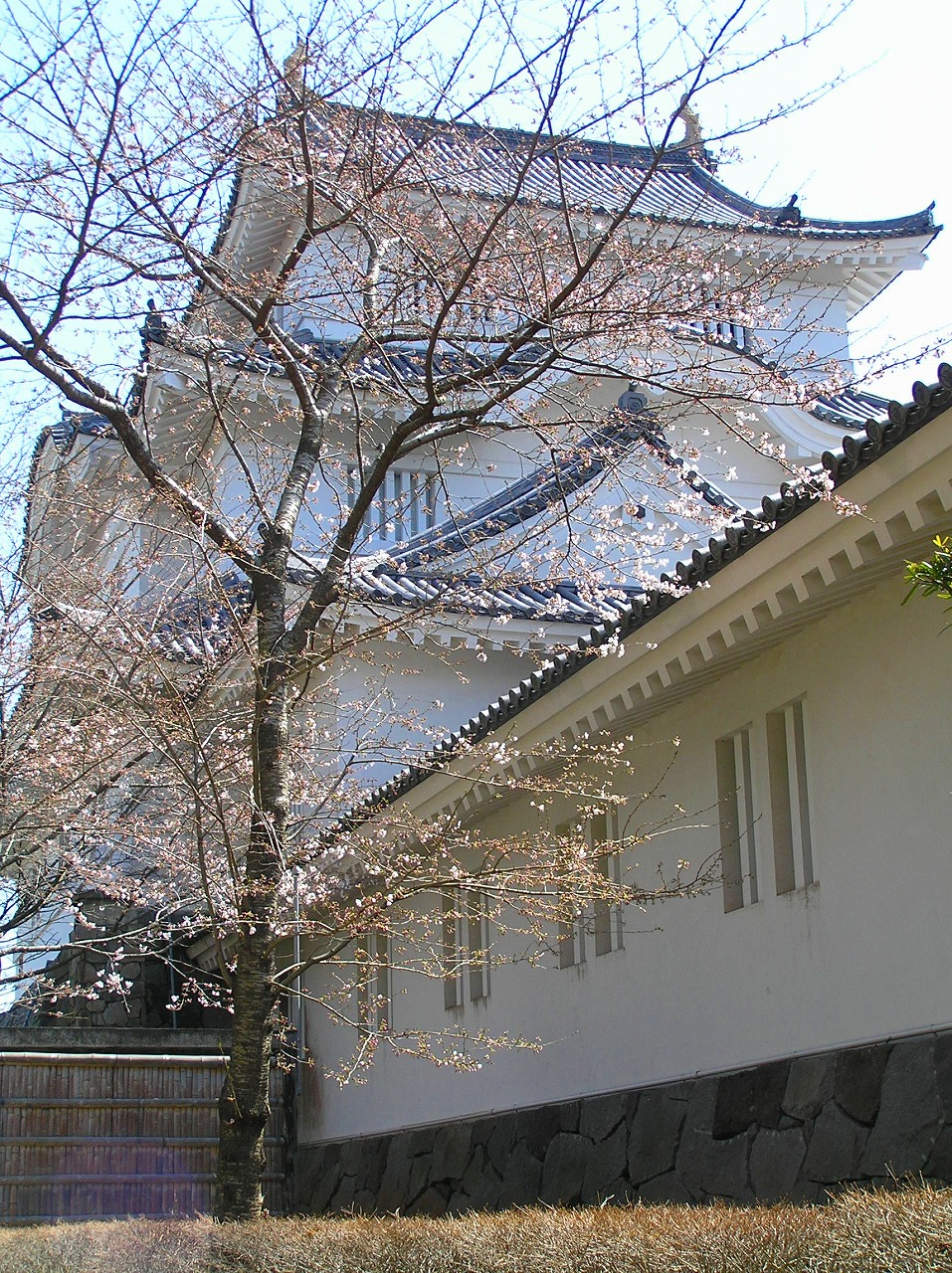
- Ōtaki Castle

- Flag Emblem

- Location of Ōtaki in Chiba Prefecture

- Coordinates: 35°17′6.6″N 140°14′43.5″E
- Country: Japan
- Region: Kantō
- Prefecture: Chiba
- District: Isumi

Area
  - Total: 129.87 km^{2} (50.14 sq mi)

Population (January 1, 2019)
  - Total: 8,982
  - Density: 69.16/km^{2} (179.1/sq mi)
- Time zone: UTC+9 (Japan Standard Time)
- Tree: Sakura
- Phone number: 0470-82-2111
- Address: 93 Ōtaki, Ōtaki-machi, Chiba-ken 298-0292
- Website: Official website

Ōtaki (大多喜町, Ōtaki-machi) is a Japanese town in Chiba Prefecture, Japan. The town is known for its association with Edo period general Honda Tadakatsu, and its castle. As of 1 January 2019, the town had an estimated population of 8,982 in 3820 households and a population density of 69 persons per km^{2}. The total area of the town is 129.87 square kilometres (50.14 sq mi), making it the largest of Chiba Prefecture's towns and villages.

== Etymology ==
The name of the town of Ōtaki in the Japanese language is composed of three kanji characters: the first, ō (大), meaning "large", the second, ta (多), meaning "many", and the third, ki (喜), meaning "happiness".

== Geography ==
Ōtaki is a landlocked town in the center of the Bōsō Peninsula, about 35 kilometers from the prefectural capital at Chiba and 60 to 70 kilometers from central Tokyo. The southwest area of Ōtaki is mountainous, with elevations gradually lowering towards the northeast of the town. Approximately 70% of Ōtaki is covered by forest. The Isumi River flows through the town to the northeast, and in the western part of the town the Yōrō River flows to the north. The town extends for about 12 kilometers east to west by about 19 kilometers north to south.

=== Surrounding municipalities ===
Chiba Prefecture

- Chōnan
- Ichihara
- Isumi
- Kamogawa
- Katsuura
- Kimitsu
- Mutsuzawa

=== Climate ===
Ōtaki has a humid subtropical climate (Köppen Cfa) characterized by warm summers and cool winters with light to no snowfall. The average annual temperature in Ōtaki is 14.9 °C. The average annual rainfall is 1828 mm with September as the wettest month. The temperatures are highest on average in August, at around 25.5 °C, and lowest in January, at around 5.3 °C.

== Demographics ==
Per Japanese census data, the population of Ōtaki has been decreasing over the past 70 years and is now less than it was a century ago.

Historical population
| Year | Pop. | ±% |
|---|---|---|
| 1920 | 15,451 | — |
| 1930 | 15,601 | +1.0% |
| 1940 | 16,140 | +3.5% |
| 1950 | 19,668 | +21.9% |
| 1960 | 17,247 | −12.3% |
| 1970 | 14,620 | −15.2% |
| 1980 | 13,612 | −6.9% |
| 1990 | 13,218 | −2.9% |
| 2000 | 12,121 | −8.3% |
| 2010 | 10,671 | −12.0% |
| 2020 | 8,885 | −16.7% |

== History ==
=== Early history ===
Ōtaki was settled in prehistoric times, as evidenced by the Jōmon period remains in Oikawa. In the Asuka period the Ōtaki region became part of Kazusa Province at the western end of the Tōkaidō region, which was formed as a result of the Taika Reform of 654. In the Sengoku period Ōtaki was established as a castle town, which successively controlled by different regional clans, most notably the Takeda clan and the Toki clan. The Ōtaki region ultimately came under the control of the powerful Awa Province-based Satomi clan in 1544.

=== Edo Period ===
In 1590 Tokugawa Ieyasu took control of all of Kazusa Province. Ieyasu granted Ōtaki to his famed general Honda Tadakatsu, and established the Ōtaki Domain as a 100,000 koku feudal domain. Tadakatsu built Ōtaki Castle on the site of the earlier castle and laid out a large-scale castle town. Honda Tadakatsu's placement at Ōtaki was a strong buffer against the military power of the Satomi clan to the south. The ownership of the castle changed hands many times after Honda Tadakatsu's control, but from 1703 the Matsudaira clan held the castle for nine generations. Despite the Matsudaira clan's control of the castle, the majority of the Ōtaki region was controlled as tenryō territory by hatamoto in direct service to the Tokugawa shogunate. In 1609 a Spanish galleon, the San Francisco, ran aground near Ōtaki . The survivors were housed in Ōtaki Castle, and later, the sailors were given a ship by the shogunate to return to Mexico. One of the survivors was Governor General of the Philippines Rodrigo de Vivero, who was subsequently granted an audience with shōgun Tokugawa Ieyasu.

=== Modern Period ===
After the Meiji Restoration the administrative structure of the region changed frequently. Ōtaki was successively part of Ōtaki Prefecture, then Kisarazu Prefecture, before becoming part of the present-day Chiba Prefecture. On April 1, 1889, under the same administrative reforms, the four villages of Oikawa, Nishihata, Fusamoto, Kamitaki and the town of Ōtaki were formed. The five were brought together to become present-day town of Ōtaki on October 5, 1954.

== Government ==
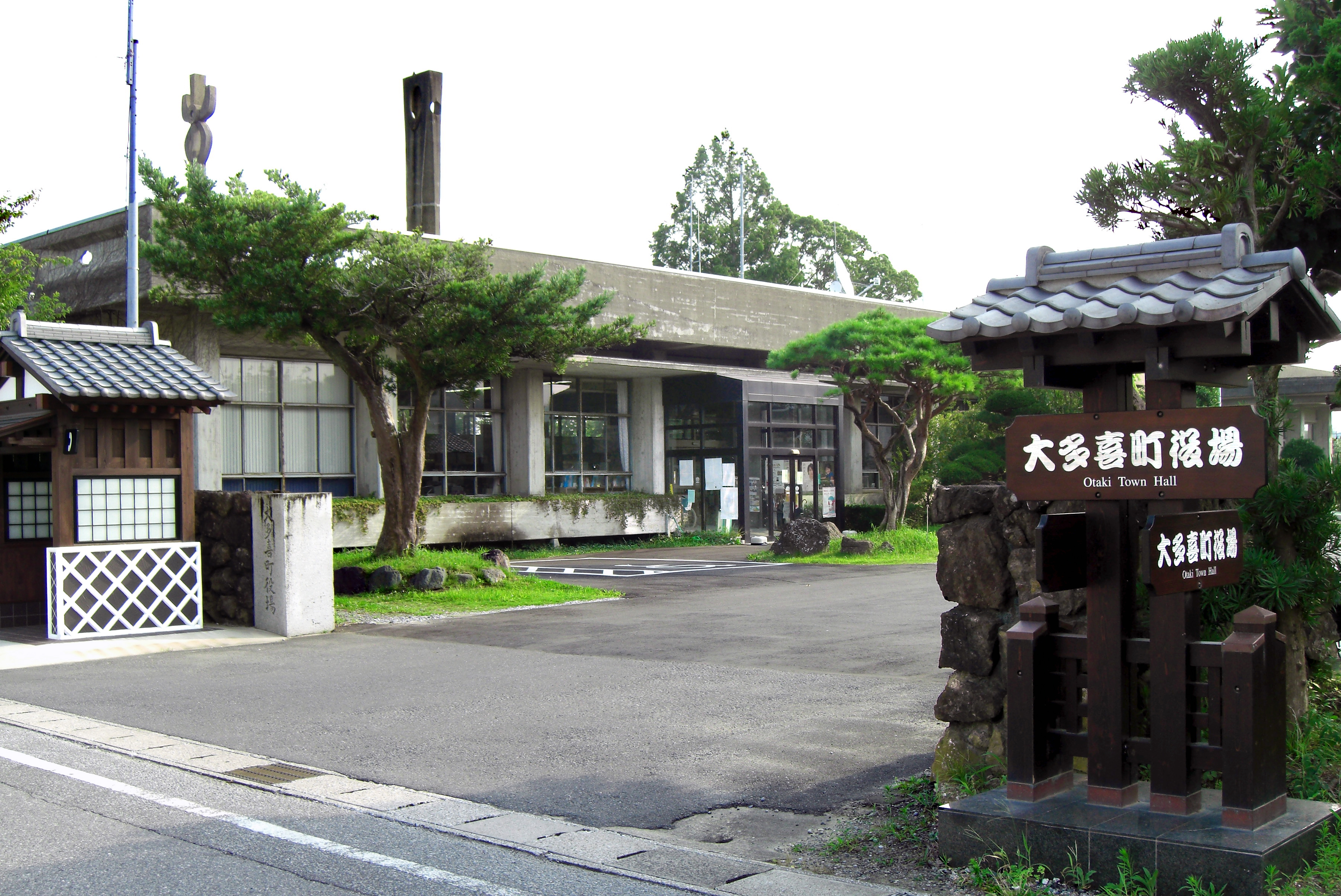
Ōtaki Town Hall

Ōtaki has a mayor-council form of government with a directly elected mayor and a unicameral town council of 12 members. Ōtaki, together with the city of Katsuura, contributes one member to the Chiba Prefectural Assembly. In terms of national politics, the town is part of Chiba 11th district of the lower house of the Diet of Japan.

== Economy ==
The economy of Ōtaki was based largely on rice production, forestry, and traditional charcoal production, but after World War II all three industries have declined. The town produces shiitake mushrooms and bamboo shoots as special agricultural products. Tourism has increased as a result of visits to Ōtaki Castle, the Ōtaki Prefectural Forest, and various scenic spots. Golf courses were developed in Ōtaki, but have caused problems with flooding and deforestation.

== Education ==
Local schools include Saniku Gakuin College.

== Notable sites ==
- Myōhōshō-ji
- Ōtaki Castle, built in 1521 and demolished in 1871. The stone base of the structure is the base of the original castle's tenshu, the building itself is a reproduction of the original castle tower. It houses the Ōtaki Branch of the Chiba Prefectural Museum.
- Ryōgen-ji

== Sister citiy ==
- Otaki has been twinned with Cuernavaca, Mexico, since August 3, 1978.
