= Ōtaki Castle (Chiba) =

Coordinates: 35°17′9.18″N 140°14′21.63″E

Ōtaki Castle 大多喜城
- Ōtaki, Chiba Prefecture, Japan
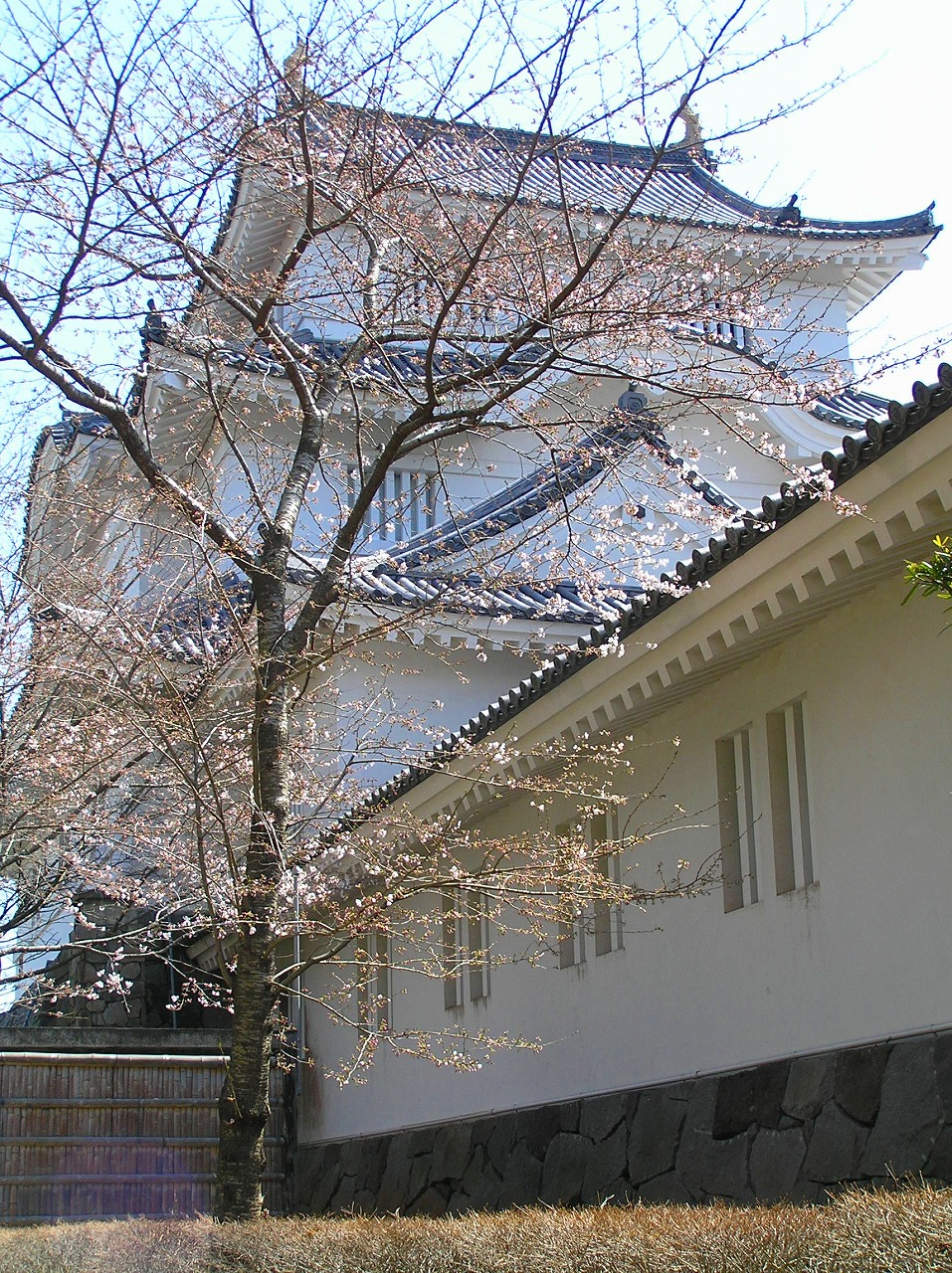
- Reconstructed Main Keep of Ōtaki Castle

Site information
- Type: flatland-style Japanese castle
- Owner: reconstructed 1975
- Open to the public: yes

Location

Site history
- Built: 1590
- Built by: Honda Tadakatsu
- In use: Edo period
- Demolished: 1871

Garrison information
- Past commanders: Honda Tadakatsu

Ōtaki Castle (大多喜城, Ōtaki-jō) is a Japanese castle located in Ōtaki, southeast Chiba Prefecture, Japan. In the Edo period, Ōtaki Castle was given to Honda Tadakatsu. The castle was also known as "Odaki-jō" (小田喜城).

== History ==
=== Construction of the Castle ===
The Satomi clan, virtually independent rulers of all of the Bōsō Peninsula during the Sengoku period, erected the original Ōtaki Castle in the early 1500s to guard the northern approaches to their domains, but fell into ruins by the end of the 16th century. This period of local hostilities, and the exploits of the Satomi clan, is richly described in the Bōsō Chiran-Ki.

=== Edo Period ===
In 1590, after Tokugawa Ieyasu was resettled in Edo, by order of Toyotomi Hideyoshi, he assigned Honda Tadakatsu to erect a new fortification to help contain the power of the Satomi in Tateyama Domain. The Satomi were destroyed by the Tokugawa shogunate in 1614, but the Honda continued to rule as daimyō of the 100,000 koku Ōtaki Domain for the following three generations. Control of Ōtaki Domain subsequently passed to daimyōs from the Abe, Aoyama, and Inagaki clans before being assigned to Matsudaira Masahisa, whose descendants continued to rule from Ōtaki Castle until the Meiji Restoration. However, during this history, Ōtaki Domain was reduced from 100,000 koku to 16,000 koku.

=== Disrepair and Ruin ===
In December 1672, an application was made to the Tokugawa shogunate for permission to rebuild the castle, stating that there was not even a single functional gate and that the 4-story donjon had fallen into ruins. The reconstructed donjon burned down in 1842 and was not rebuilt.

=== Reconstruction ===
The current donjon was reconstructed in 1975 to boost local tourism and to function as an annex to the local Chiba Prefectural Sonan Museum containing historical artifacts including a small collection of Japanese armor and swords. As there are no surviving records indicating the appearance of the original donjon, the current structure is a mock structure modeled after 1832 sketches of its last known appearance.

An Ōtaki Castle Festival is held in late September each year. The main event is a parade of people wearing samurai armor and costumes reflecting the Edo period.

The Castle was listed as one of the Continued Top 100 Japanese Castles in 2017.

== Literature ==
- De Lange, William (2021). An Encyclopedia of Japanese Castles. Groningen: Toyo Press. pp. 600 pages. ISBN 978-9492722300.
- Schmorleitz, Morton S. (1974). Castles in Japan. Tokyo: Charles E. Tuttle Co. pp. 144–145. ISBN 0-8048-1102-4.
- Motoo, Hinago (1986). Japanese Castles. Tokyo: Kodansha. p. 200 pages. ISBN 0-87011-766-1.
- Mitchelhill, Jennifer (2004). Castles of the Samurai: Power and Beauty. Tokyo: Kodansha. p. 112 pages. ISBN 4-7700-2954-3.
- Turnbull, Stephen (2003). Japanese Castles 1540–1640. Osprey Publishing. p. 64 pages. ISBN 1-84176-429-9.
