= Yōrō River =

Yōrō River 養老川
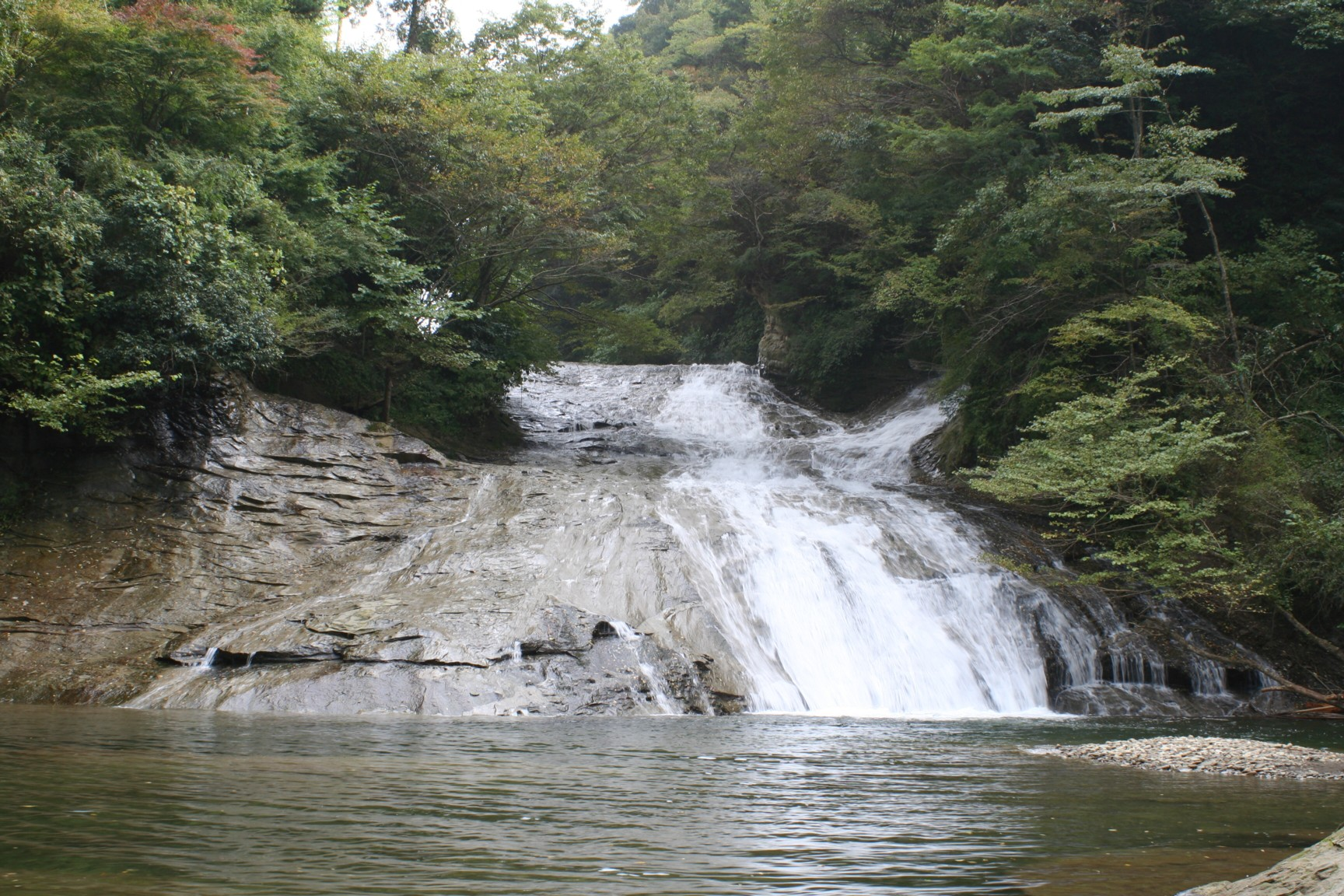
- Taka Falls, Yōrō River

Location
- Country: Japan

Physical characteristics
- Source
  - location: Ōtaki and Kamogawa, Chiba Prefecture
  - elevation: 260 m (850 ft)
- Mouth: Tokyo Bay
  - location: Ichihara
  - coordinates: 35°32′28″N 140°04′07″E
  - elevation: 0 m (0 ft)
- Length: 73.4 km (45.6 mi)
- Basin size: 245.9 km^{2} (94.9 sq mi)

The Yōrō River (養老川, Yōrōgawa) is a river in Chiba Prefecture, Japan. It is 73.4 kilometers (45.6 mi) in length and has a drainage area of 260 square kilometers (100 sq mi). Under the Rivers Act of 1906 the Yōrō is designated as a Class 2 River. The Yōrō originates near Mount Kiyosumi on the border of Amatsukominato area of Kamogawa and Ōtaki, and then passes through Ōtaki and Ichihara. The Yōrō Ravine and Awamata Falls are located in the upper part of the Yōrō, and it meets the Koshikiya River, the Heizō River, and the Uchida River at its midpoint. Land around the middle and lower parts of the Yōrō have been developed for rice production. The river flows through significant parts of the Bōsō Hill Range before it empties into Tokyo Bay in the Goi and Iwazaki districts of Ichihara. Land reclamation at the mouth of the Yōrō is a component of the Keiyō Industrial Zone. The Kominato Line of the Kominato Railway roughly follows the path of the Yōrō and provides access to many of the tourist destinations along the river, including mountains, waterfalls, and an onsen hot spring.

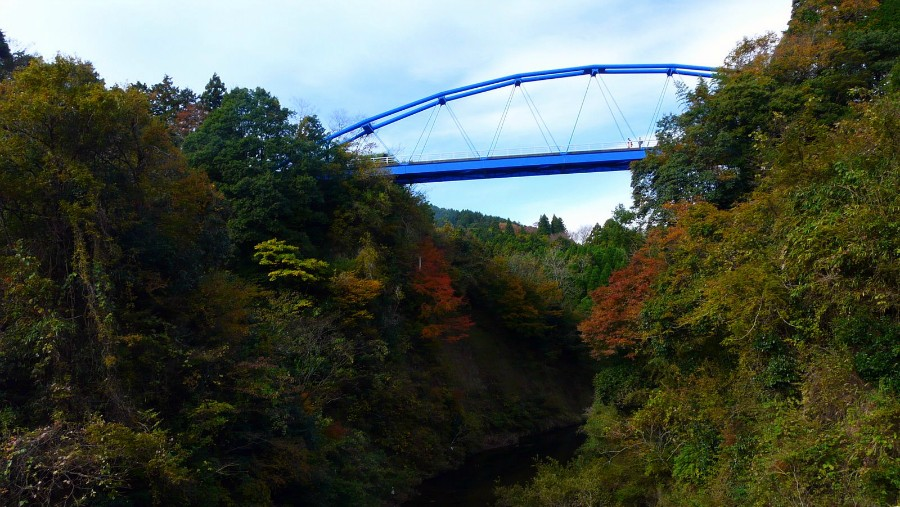
View of Yōrō River from the Hōei Bridge, Ichihara, Chiba
