= Awa-Amatsu Station =

Railway station in Kamogawa, Chiba Prefecture, Japan

Awa-Amatsu Station 安房天津駅
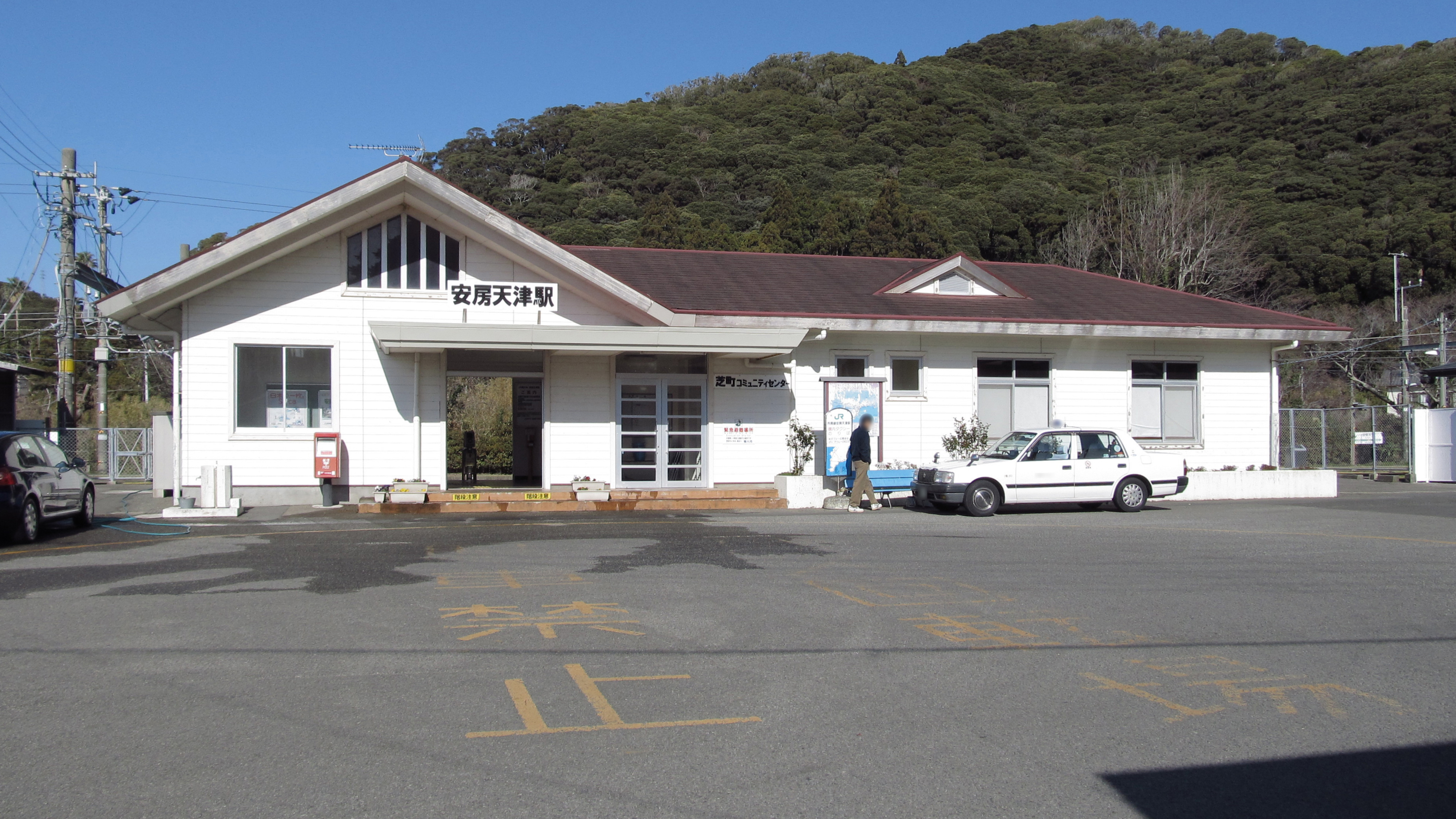
- Awa-Amatsu Station in January 2014

General information
- Location: Amatsu, Kamogawa-shi, Chiba-ken 299-5503; Japan
- Coordinates: 35.1257°N 140.1544°E
- Operator: JR East
- Line: ■ Sotobo Line
- Distance: 87.8 km from Chiba
- Platforms: 2 side platforms
- Tracks: 2
- Connections: Bus stop

Other information
- Status: Unstaffed
- Website: Official website

History
- Opened: 15 April 1929; 97 years ago

Passengers
- FY2016: 133 daily

Services
Preceding station	JR East	Following station
Awa-Kominato towards Soga or Chiba	Sotobō Line Local	Awa-Kamogawa Terminus
Location
- Location within Chiba Prefecture Location within Japan

Awa-Amatsu Station (安房天津駅, Awa-Amatsu-eki) is a passenger railway station in the city of Kamogawa, Chiba Prefecture, Japan, operated by East Japan Railway Company (JR East).

== Lines ==
Awa-Amatsu Station is served by the Sotobo Line, and lies 87.8 km (54.6 mi) from the starting point of the line at Chiba Station.

== Station layout ==
The station consists of two opposed side platforms connected by a footbridge. The station is unattended.

=== Platform ===
1	■ Sotobo Line	for Awa-Kamogawa
2	■ Sotobo Line	for Katsuura, Ōhara, Chiba, and Tokyo

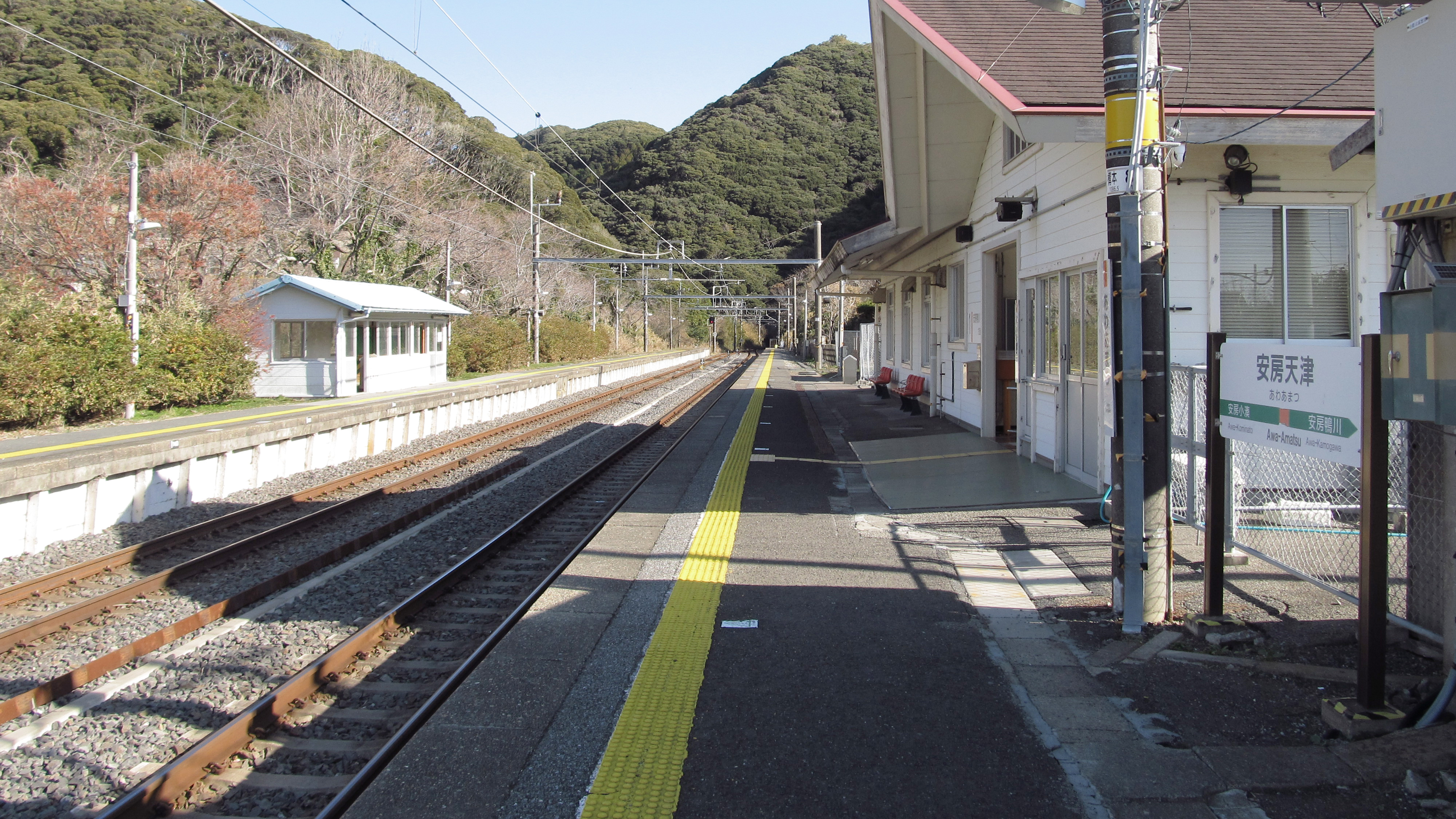
The platforms in January 2014

== History ==
Awa-Amatsu Station opened on 15 April 1929. The station was absorbed into the JR East network upon the privatization of Japanese National Railways (JNR) on 1 April 1987.

== Passenger statistics ==
In fiscal 2018, the station was used by an average of 132 passengers daily (boarding passengers only).

== Surrounding area ==
- National Route 128

== Bus terminal ==
There is in front of the station and also has waiting room.

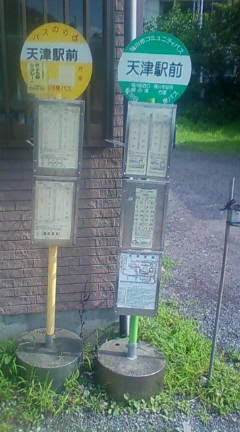
Bus stop

- Nitto Kotsu
  - For Awa-Kamogawa Station
  - For Kazusa-Okitsu Station
- Kamogawa City Community Bus
  - For Seichoji or Okuseicho

== See also ==
- List of railway stations in Japan
