= Namihana Station =

Railway station in Isumi, Chiba Prefecture, Japan

Namihana Station 浪花駅
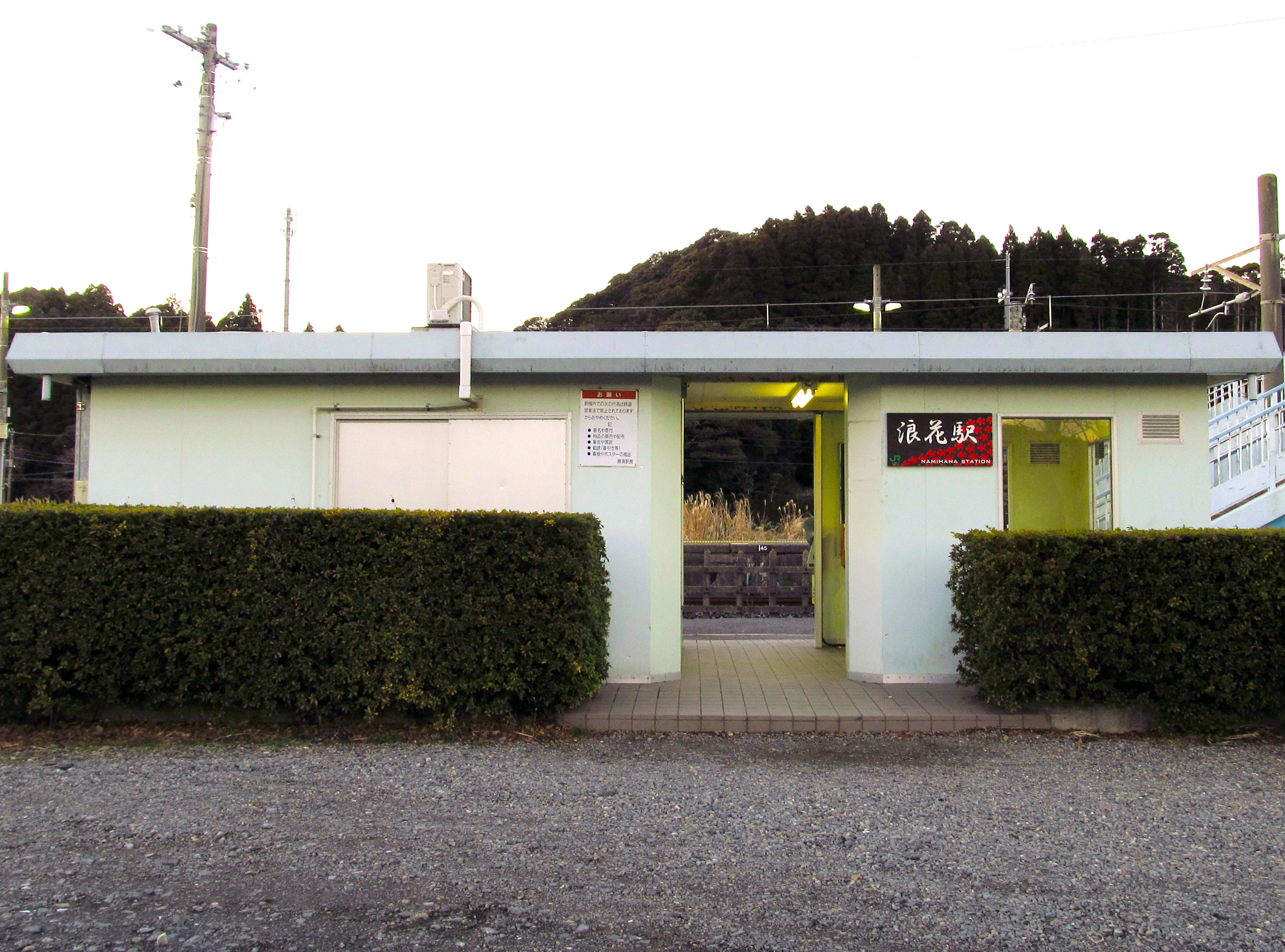
- Namihana Station in January 2014

General information
- Location: Ozawa 1456, Isumi-shi, Chiba-ken 298-0012; Japan
- Coordinates: 35.2225°N 140.3794°E
- Operator: JR East
- Line: ■ Sotobō Line
- Distance: 60.5 km from Chiba
- Platforms: 1 island platform

Other information
- Status: Unstaffed
- Website: Official website

History
- Opened: 20 June 1913; 113 years ago

Passengers
- FY2006: 96

Services
| Preceding station | JR East | Following station |
|---|---|---|
| Ōhara towards Soga | Sotobō Line Keiyō Rapid | Onjuku towards Katsuura |
| Ōhara towards Soga or Chiba | Sotobō Line Local | Onjuku towards Awa-Kamogawa |
Location
- Location within Chiba Prefecture Location within Japan

Namihana Station (浪花駅, Namihana-eki) is a passenger railway station located in the city of Isumi, Chiba Prefecture Japan, operated by the East Japan Railway Company (JR East).

== Lines ==
Namihana Station is served by the Sotobō Line, and is located 60.5 km (37.6 mi) from the official starting point of the line at Chiba Station.

== Station layout ==
Namihana Station has a single island platform connected to a white-washed station building. The station is unattended.

=== Platforms ===
| 1 | ■ Sotobō Line | Katsuura, Awa-Kamogawa |
| 2 | ■ Sotobō Line | For Kazusa-Ichinomiya, Mobara, Soga, Chiba |

== History ==
Namihana Station was opened on 20 June 1913. The current station building dates from 1980. The station was absorbed into the JR East network upon the privatization of the Japan National Railways (JNR) on 1 April 1987.

== Passenger statistics ==
In fiscal 2006, the station was used by an average of 96 passengers daily.

== Surrounding area ==
- National Route 128
- Namihana post office

== See also ==
- List of railway stations in Japan
