= International Budo University =

Private university in Chiba, Japan

Coordinates: 35°09′37.07″N 140°19′15.75″E

- 国際武道大学; Kokusai Budō Daigaku
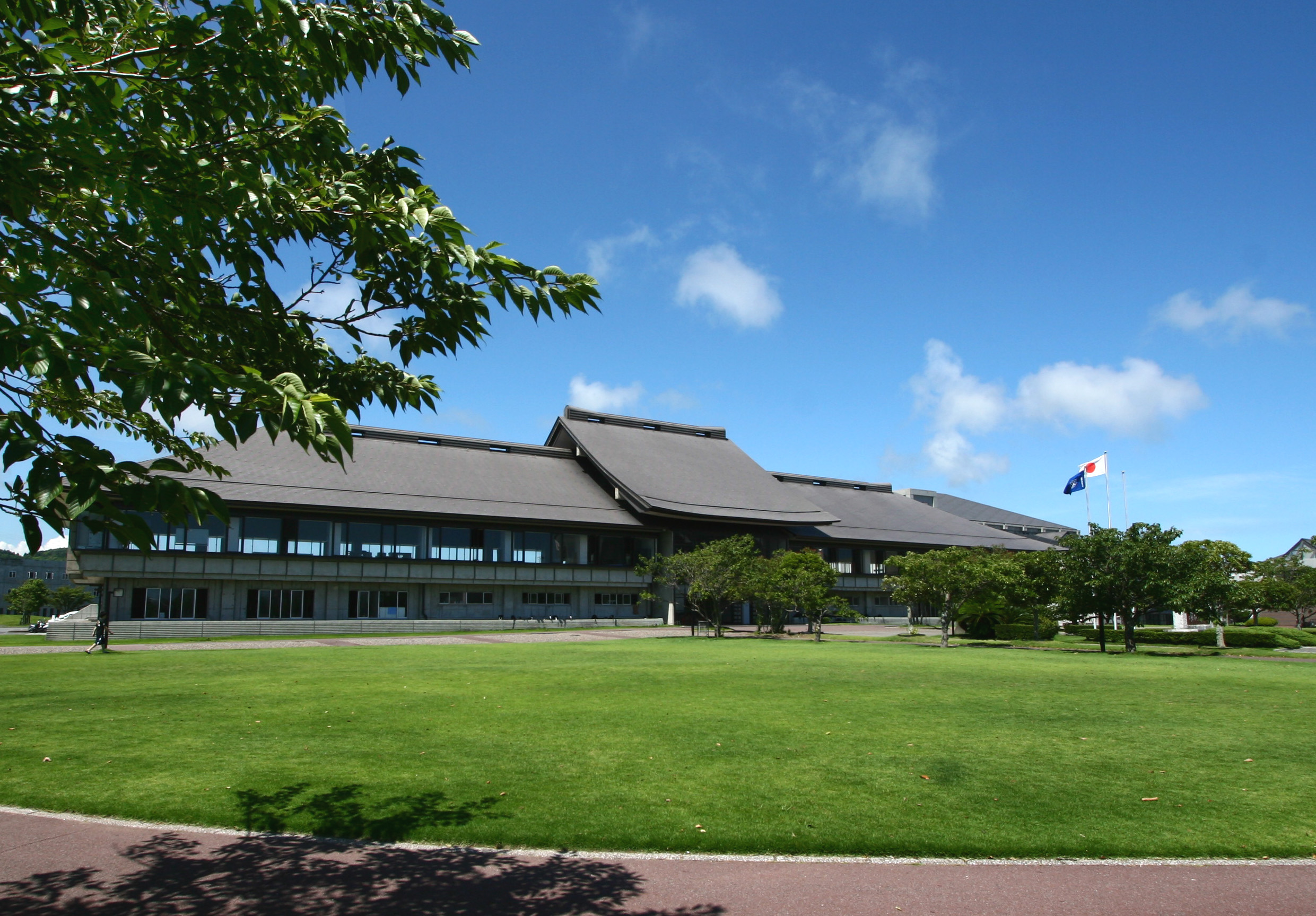
- Type: Private
- Established: 1984
- Location: Katsuura, Chiba, Japan
- Website: www.budo-u.ac.jp

International Budo University (国際武道大学, Kokusai Budō Daigaku) (IBU) is a private university in Katsuura, Chiba, Chiba Prefecture, Japan, established in 1984. The university has a specialized curriculum in physical education, specifically the budō Japanese martial arts, sports, and physical culture. In addition to martial arts training, the university also offer theoretical classes of various subjects and especially budō history.

== History ==
- International Budo University was established in 1984.
- Graduate school in International Budo University was established in 1996.

== Organization ==
=== Faculties ===
- Department of Physical Education
- Department of Budo, includes:
  - judo
  - kendo
  - kyūdō
  - naginata
  - karate
  - shorinji kempo
  - aikido
- Department of Athletic Training
- Department of International Sport Culture

=== Graduate schools ===
- Martial arts and physical culture of sports
- Sports medicine
- Coaching science
- Exercise and health

=== Special course ===
IBU hosts a year-long program in budo for foreign students called the Budo Specialization Program (別科武道専修課程, Bekka Budō Senshū Katei). The program, inaugurated in 1984, is limited to 20 students. The program follows the Japanese academic school year, which begins in April and ends in March. The Budo Specialization Program curriculum focuses primarily on the advanced study of judō or kendō study, and secondarily on the study of Japanese culture and the Japanese language. Students from non-English speaking countries can elect to study English in the second semester. Students can elect to live at the Matsumae Memorial International Exchange Hall, which is located on the campus in Katsuura.

=== Seminar ===
IBU hosts the International Seminar of Budo Culture (国際武道文化セミナー, Kokusai Budō Bunka Seminā) annually in March. The multi-day seminar is held for non-Japanese budō practitioners who reside in Japan, and is intended "to deepen the understanding of historical philosophic and scientific aspects of budo to increase our mutual friendship and internationalize our traditional culture". The seminar is conducted by Nippon Budokan, headquartered in Tokyo.

== International relationships ==
IBU maintains international exchange programs on various levels with seven universities, including:

- Yong In University (South Korea)
- Moscow State University (Russia)
- Concordia University (Oregon) (United States)
- Far Eastern Federal University (Russia)
- Tianjin Institute of Physical Education (China)
- Hawaii Tokai International College (United States)
- National Taiwan College of Physical Education (Taiwan)

== Transportation ==
=== Rail ===
IBU is accessible from Katsuura Station, which is served by the JR East Sotobō Line.

Katsuura Station can be reached from Tokyo Station:

- 1.5 hours by direct express train Wakashio, or
- 2.5 hours by local train with a transfer at Soga Station

The campus is a 15-minute walk from the station.

=== Highway ===
IBU is accessible by highway via:

- Japan National Route 128
- Japan National Route 297
