= Namegawa Island Station =

Railway station in Katsuura, Chiba Prefecture, Japan

Namegawa Island Station 行川アイランド駅
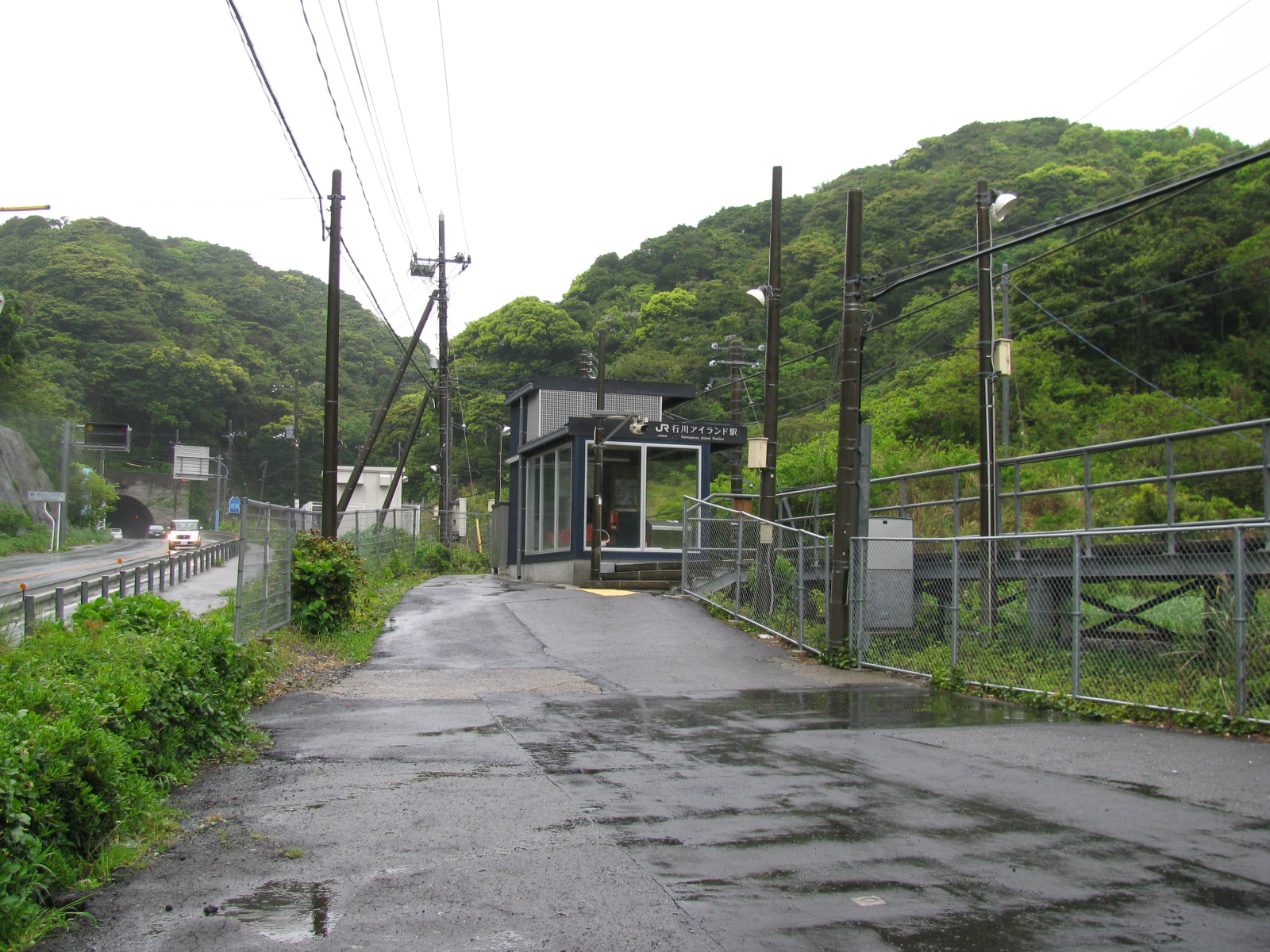
- Namegawa Island Station

General information
- Location: Hamanamegawa 606, Katsuura-shi, Chiba-ken 299-5255; Japan
- Coordinates: 35.1181°N 140.2272°E
- Operator: JR East
- Line: ■ Sotobō Line
- Distance: 80.5 km from Soga
- Platforms: 1 side platform

Other information
- Status: Unstaffed
- Website: Official website

History
- Opened: 2 July 1970; 56 years ago

Passengers
- FY2006: 19

Services
Preceding station	JR East	Following station
Kazusa-Okitsu towards Soga or Chiba	Sotobō Line Local	Awa-Kominato towards Awa-Kamogawa
Location
- Location within Chiba Prefecture Location within Japan

Namegawa Island Station (行川アイランド駅, Namegawa-Airando-eki) is a passenger railway station located in the city of Katsuura, Chiba Prefecture, Japan operated by the East Japan Railway Company (JR East).

== Lines ==
Namegawa Island Station is served by the Sotobō Line, and is located 80.5 km (50.0 mi) from the official starting point of the line at Chiba Station.

== Station layout ==
The station consists of a single side platforms serving bidirectional traffic. The station is unattended.

== History ==
Namegawa Island Station was opened as a seasonal station on 2 July 1970 to cater to the summer tourist traffic to the nearby Namegawa Island Amusement Park. A number of express trains began stopping at the station from 18 July 1970. The station was upgraded to a year-around station from 1 April 1987, and was made unattended at the same time. The station was absorbed into the JR East network upon the privatization of the Japan National Railways (JNR) on 1 April 1987. The station became a kan'i itaku station in 1990. With the closure of the Namekawa Island Amusement Park on 31 August 2001, the station was again unattended, and express trains services were discontinued. The station building was remodeled in January 2008.

== Passenger statistics ==
In fiscal 2006, the station was used by an average of 19 passengers daily (boarding passengers only).

== Surrounding area ==
- National Route 128

== See also ==
- List of railway stations in Japan
