= Ubara Station =

Railway station in Katsuura, Chiba Prefecture, Japan

Ubara Station 鵜原駅
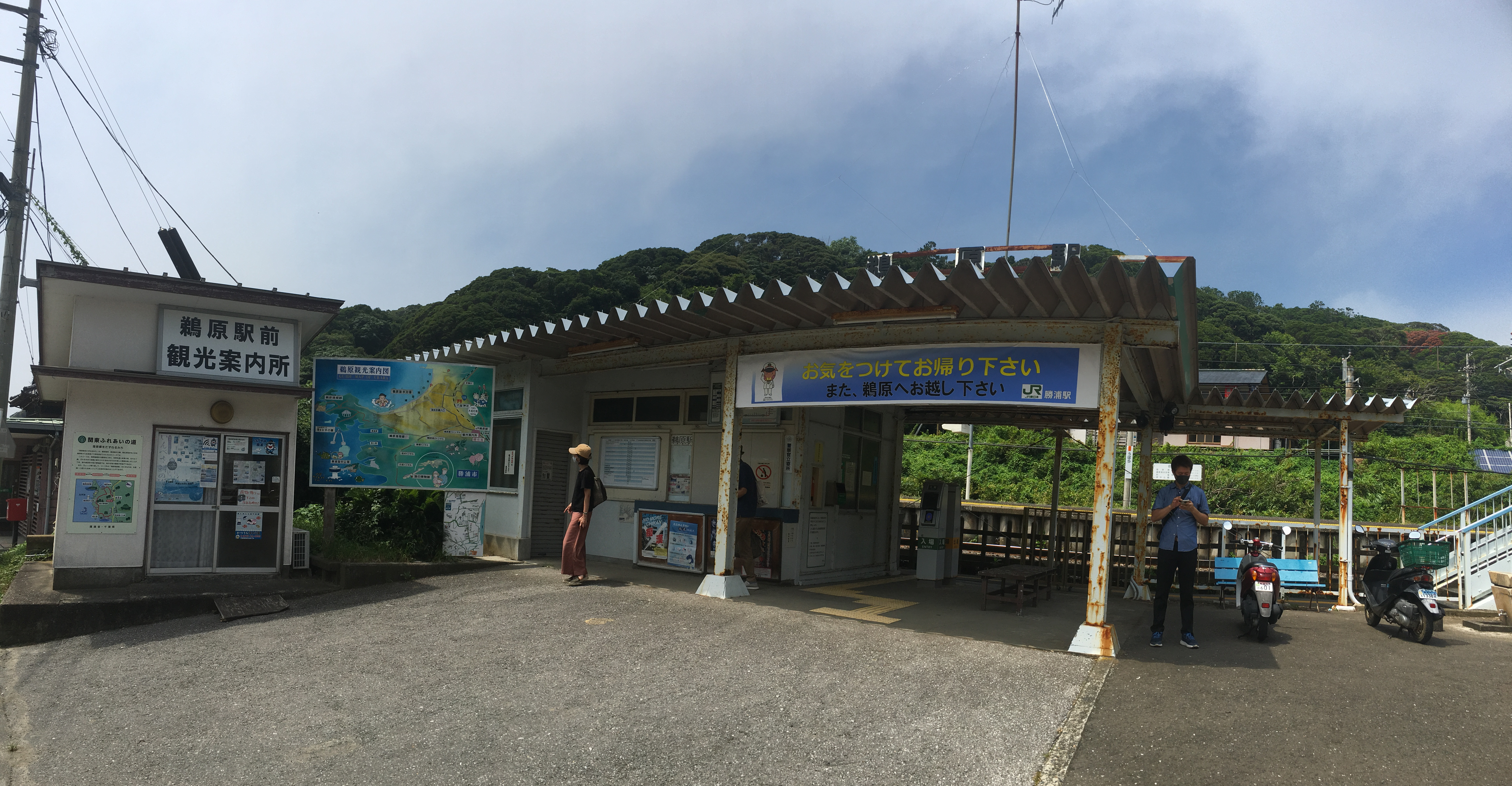
- Ubara Station, 2020

General information
- Location: Ubara 1664, Katsuura-shi, Chiba-ken 299-5243; Japan
- Coordinates: 35.1406°N 140.2786°E
- Operator: JR East
- Line: ■ Sotobō Line
- Distance: 74.5 km from Soga
- Platforms: 1 island platform

Other information
- Status: Unstaffed
- Website: Official website

History
- Opened: 15 April 1927; 99 years ago

Passengers
- FY2015: 84

Services
Preceding station	JR East	Following station
Katsuura towards Soga or Chiba	Sotobō Line Local	Kazusa-Okitsu towards Awa-Kamogawa
Location
- Location within Chiba Prefecture Location within Japan

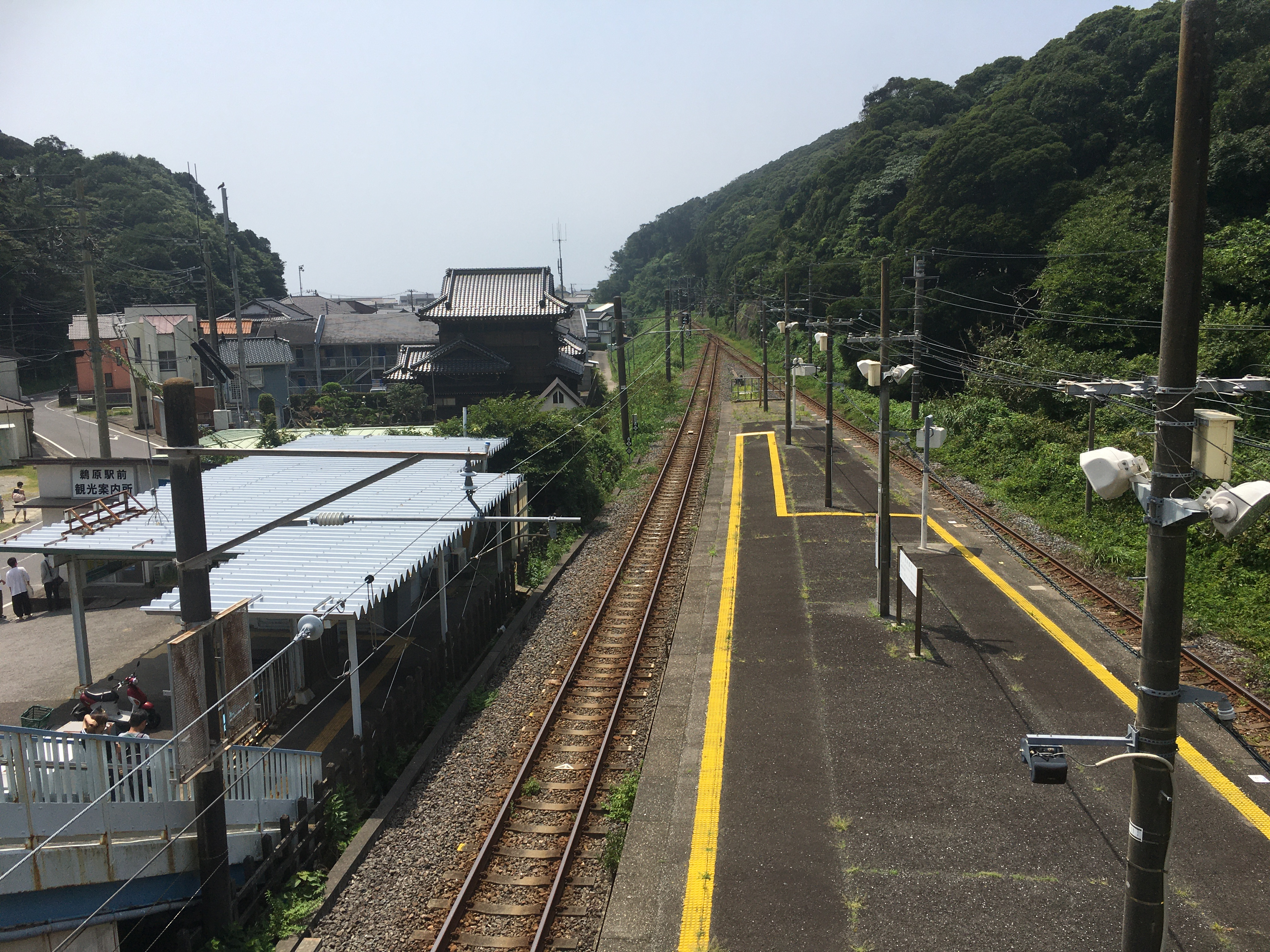
Station platforms, 2020

Ubara Station (鵜原駅, Ubara-eki) is a passenger railway station located in the city of Katsuura, Chiba Prefecture, Japan operated by the East Japan Railway Company (JR East).

== Lines ==
Ubara Station is served by the Sotobō Line, and is located 74.5 km (46.3 mi) from the official starting point of the line at Chiba Station.

== Station Layout ==
Ubara Station has a single island platform connected to a wooden station building by a footbridge. The station is unattended.

=== Platform ===
1	■ Sotobō Line	Awa-Kamogawa
2	■ Sotobō Line	For Katsuura, Mobara, Soga, Chiba

== History ==
Ubara Station was opened on 15 April 1927. It was absorbed into the JR East network upon the privatization of the Japan National Railways (JNR) on 1 April 1987. The station became a kan'i itaku station in 1990. From 2017, the station became unstaffed.

== Passenger statistics ==
In fiscal 2015, the station was used by an average of 84 passengers daily (boarding passengers only).

== Surrounding area ==
- National Route 128
- Ubara Port

== See also ==
- List of railway stations in Japan
