= Awa-Kominato Station =

Railway station in Kamogawa, Chiba Prefecture, Japan

Awa-Kominato Station 安房小湊駅
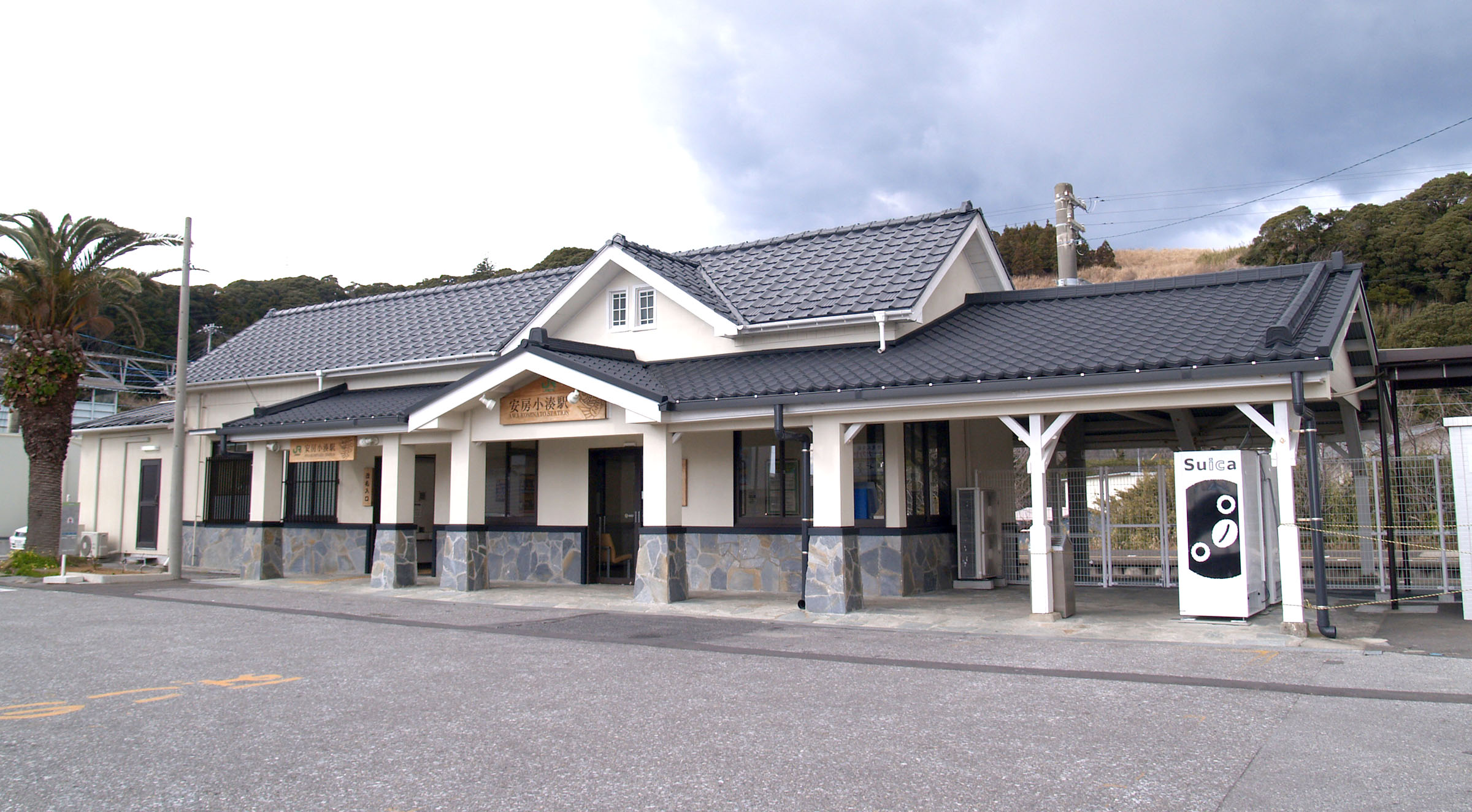
- Awa-Kominato Station

General information
- Location: Uchiura 403, Kamogawa-shi, Chiba-ken 299-5502; Japan
- Coordinates: 35.1287°N 140.1891°E
- Operator: JR East
- Line: ■ Sotobō Line
- Distance: 111.4 km from Soga
- Platforms: 1 island + 1 side platform

Other information
- Status: Staffed
- Website: Official website

History
- Opened: 15 April 1929; 97 years ago

Passengers
- FY2019: 172

Services
Preceding station	JR East	Following station
Kazusa-Okitsu towards Tokyo	Wakashio	Awa-Kamogawa Terminus
Namegawa Island towards Soga or Chiba	Sotobō Line Local	Awa-Amatsu towards Awa-Kamogawa
Location
- Location within Chiba Prefecture Location within Japan

Awa-Kominato Station (安房小湊駅, Awa-Kominato-eki) is a passenger railway station located in the city of Kamogawa, Chiba Prefecture, Japan operated by the East Japan Railway Company (JR East).

== Lines ==
Awa-Kominato Station is served by the Sotobō Line, and is located 84.3 km (52.4 mi) from the official starting point of the line at Chiba Station.

== Station layout ==
The station consists of one island platform and one side platform serving three tracks, connected to the station building by a footbridge. The station is a Kan'i itaku station operated by the Kamogawa municipal authority, with point-of-sales terminal installed.

=== Platform ===
1	■ Sotobō Line	Awa-Kamogawa
2	■ Sotobō Line	For Katsuura, Mobara, Soga, Chiba
3	■ Sotobō Line	auxiliary platform

== History ==
Amatsu-Kominato Station was opened on 15 April 1929. The station was absorbed into the JR East network upon the privatization of the Japan National Railways (JNR) on 1 April 1987.

== Passenger statistics ==
In fiscal 2019, the station was used by an average of 172 passengers daily (boarding passengers only).

== Surrounding area ==
- Kominato Elementary School
- National Route 128

== See also ==
- List of railway stations in Japan
