= Kazusa-Okitsu Station =

Railway station in Katsuura, Chiba Prefecture, Japan

Kazusa-Okitsu Station 上総興津駅
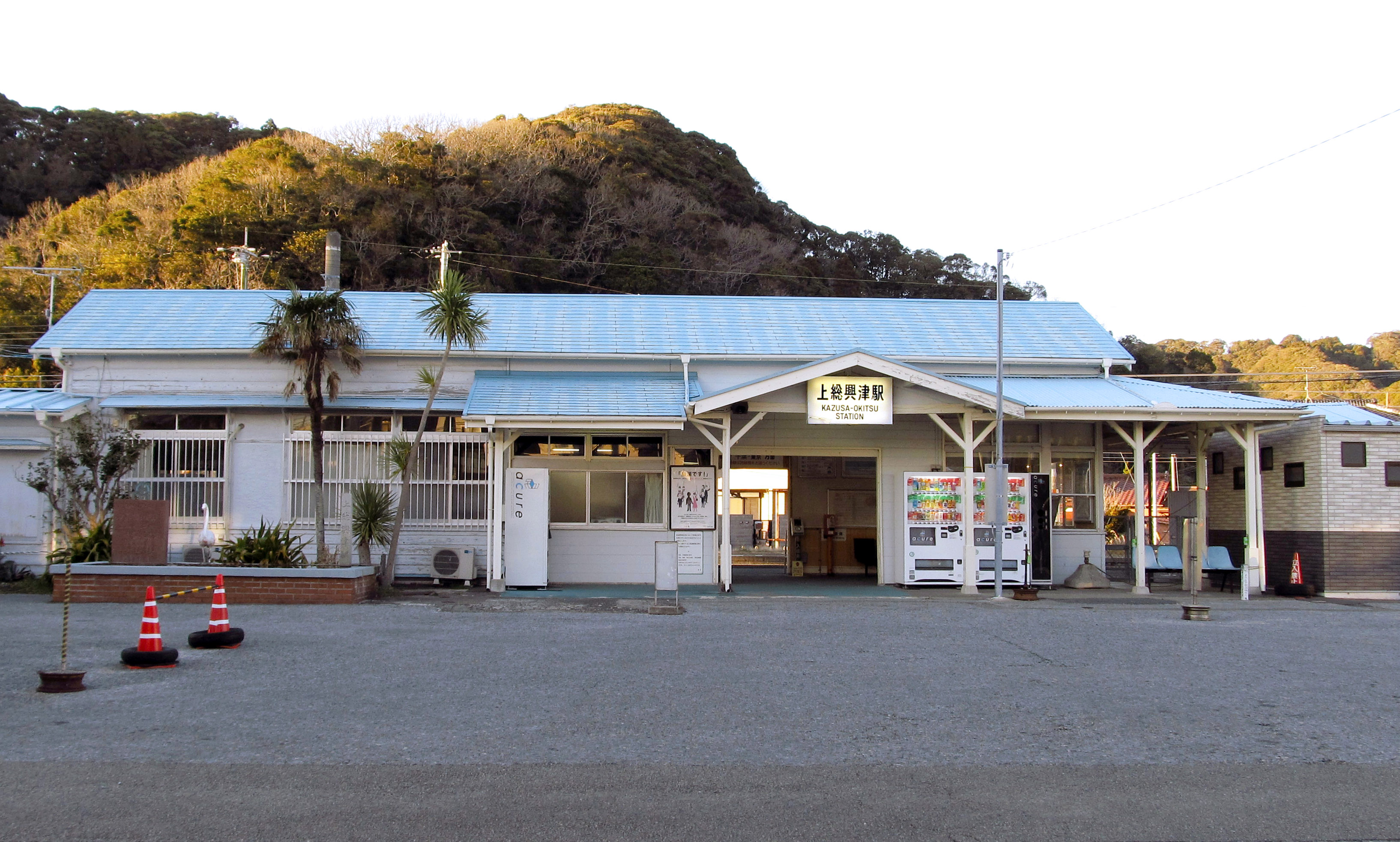
- Kazusa-Okitsu Station, January 2014

General information
- Location: Okitsu 307, Katsuura-shi, Chiba-ken 299-5245; Japan
- Coordinates: 35.1372°N 140.2507°E
- Operator: JR East
- Line: ■ Sotobō Line
- Distance: 77.2 km from Soga
- Platforms: 2 side platforms

Other information
- Status: Staffed
- Website: Official website

History
- Opened: 1 April 1927; 99 years ago

Passengers
- FY2019: 182

Services
Preceding station	JR East	Following station
Katsuura towards Tokyo	Wakashio	Awa-Kominato towards Awa-Kamogawa
Ubara towards Soga or Chiba	Sotobō Line Local	Namegawa-Island towards Awa-Kamogawa
Location
- Location within Chiba Prefecture Location within Japan

Kazusa-Okitsu Station (上総興津駅, Kazusa-Okitsu-eki) is a passenger railway station located in the city of Katsuura, Chiba Prefecture, Japan operated by the East Japan Railway Company (JR East).

== Lines ==
Kazusa-Okitsu Station is served by the Sotobō Line, and is located 77.2 km (48.0 mi) from the official starting point of the line at Chiba Station.

== Station layout ==
Kazusa-Okitsu Station has two opposed side platforms connected to a wooden station building by a footbridge. The station is staffed.

=== Platform ===
1	■ Sotobō Line	Awa-Kamogawa
2	■ Sotobō Line	For Katsuura, Mobara, Soga, Chiba

== History ==
Kazusa-Okitsu Station was opened on 1 April 1927. It was absorbed into the JR East network upon the privatization of the Japan National Railways (JNR) on 1 April 1987.

== Passenger statistics ==
In fiscal 2019, the station was used by an average of 182 passengers daily (boarding passengers only).

== Surrounding area ==
- National Route 128
- Okitsu Port

== See also ==
- List of railway stations in Japan
