= Katsuura, Chiba =

Katsuura 勝浦市
- City
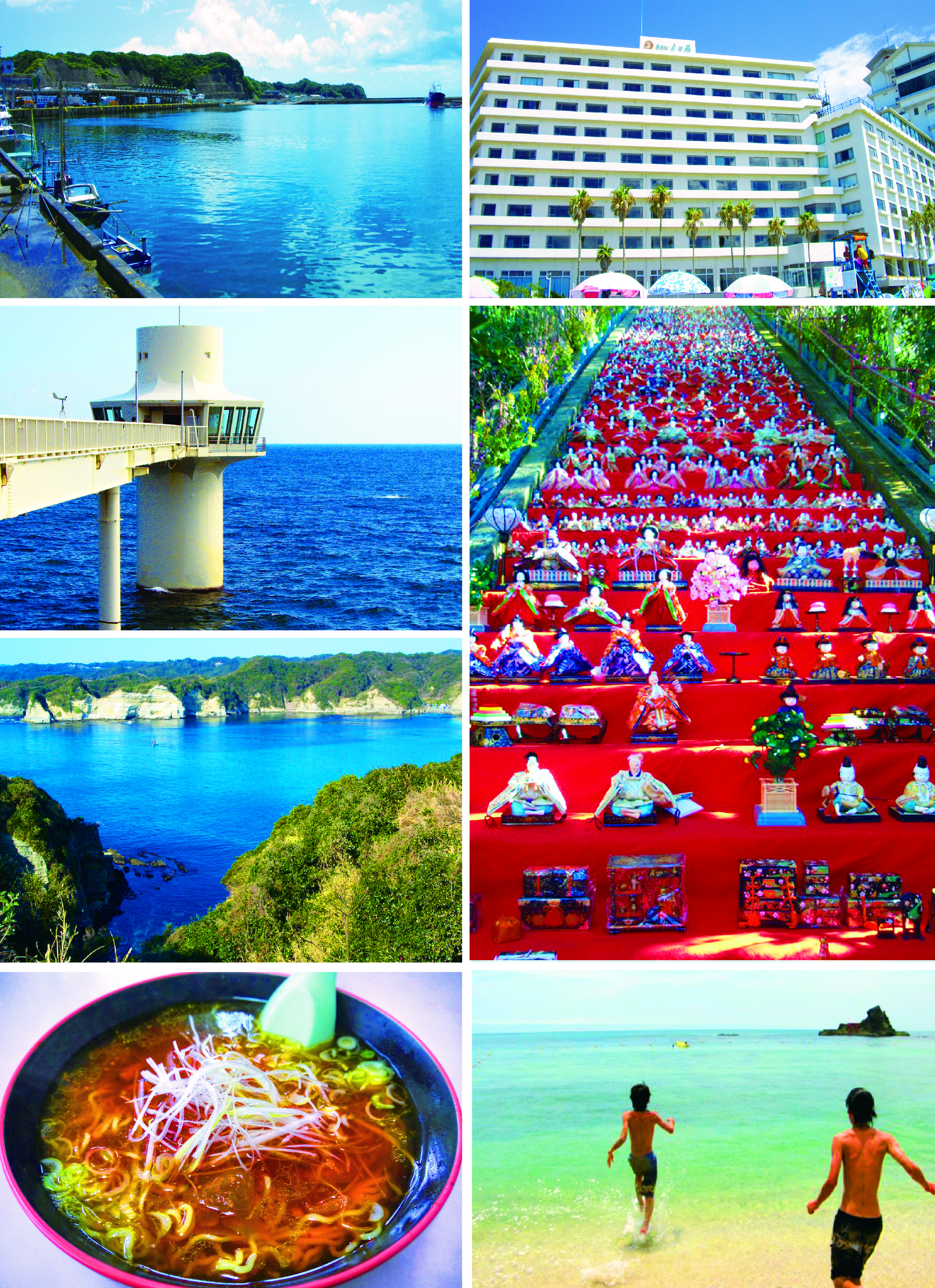
| Katsuura Fishing Port | Hotel Mikatsuki |
| Katsuura Undersea Park | Katsuura Hinamatsuri |
| Ubarai Bay | Katsuura Hinamatsuri |
| Katsuura ramen | Moriya Swimming Beach |
- Flag Emblem

- Location of Katsuura in Chiba Prefecture

- Coordinates: 35°09′N 140°19′E
- Country: Japan
- Region: Kantō
- Prefecture: Chiba

Government
  - Mayor: Masanori Isono (磯野典正) - from August 2026

Area
  - Total: 94.20 km^{2} (36.37 sq mi)

Population (November 30, 2020)
  - Total: 16,872
  - Density: 179.1/km^{2} (463.9/sq mi)
- Time zone: UTC+9 (Japan Standard Time)
- Phone number: 0470-73-1211
- Address: Shinkan 1343-1, Katsuura-shi, Chiba-ken 299-5292
- Climate: Cfa
- Website: Official website
- Symbols
- Tree: Ajisai (Hydrangea)

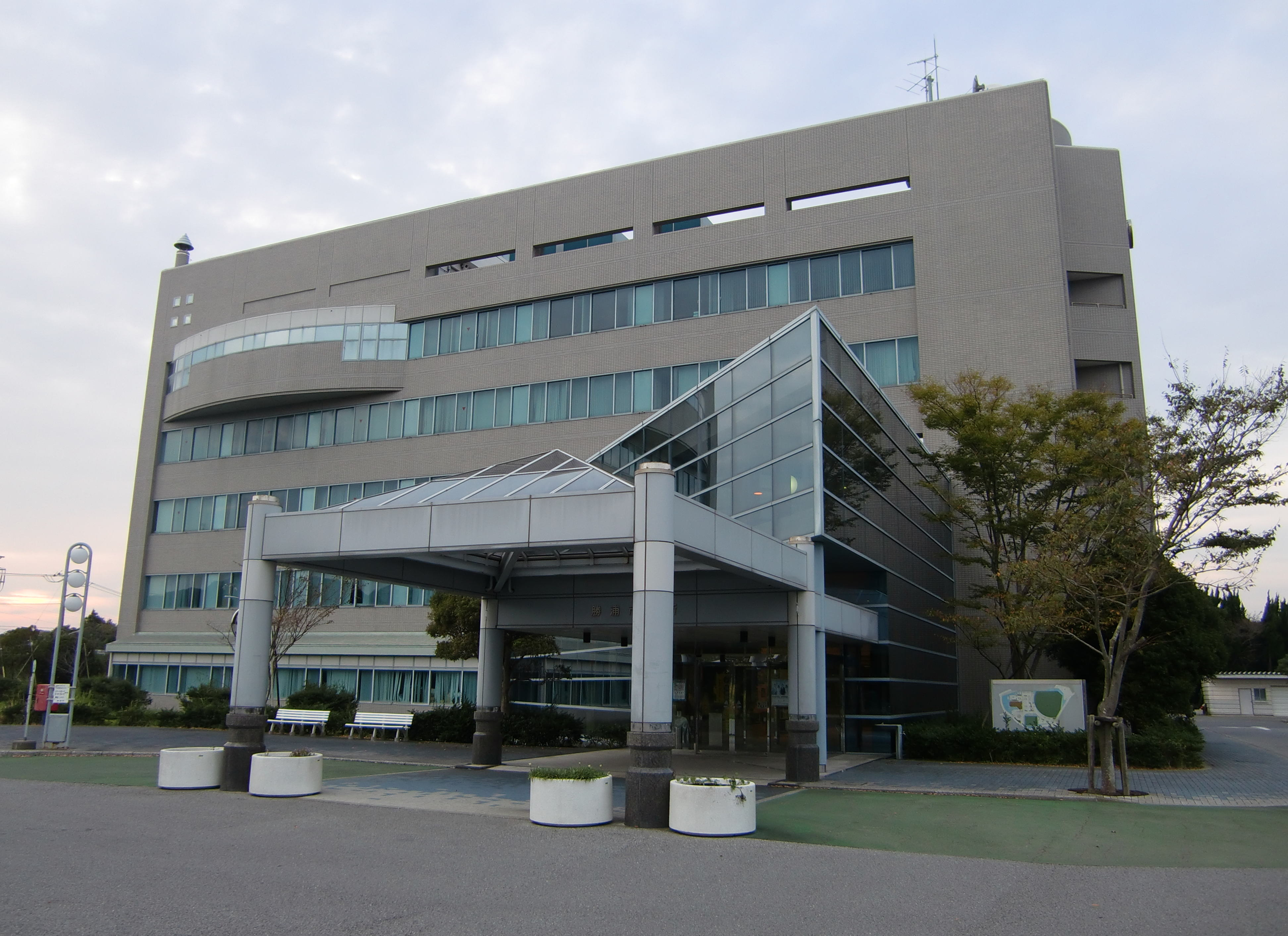
Katsuura City Hall

Katsuura (勝浦市, Katsuura-shi) is a city located in Chiba Prefecture, Japan. As of 30 November 2020, the city had an estimated population of 16,872 in 8566 households and a population density of 180 persons per km^{2}. The total area of the city is 94.20 square kilometres (36.37 sq mi). Katsuura City is famous for Katsuura Fishing Port, which features one of the top three largest morning markets in Japan.

== Geography ==
Katsuura is located on the southeast coast of Chiba Prefecture in the approximate center of the Bōsō Peninsula, approximately 55 kilometers from the prefectural capital at Chiba and within 70 to 80 kilometers of downtown Tokyo. It is bordered by the Pacific Ocean to the east. Cape Hachiman juts prominently into the Pacific Ocean and features lush sub-tropical vegetation. Two-thirds of the city is mountainous and the rolling peaks of the Bōsō Hill Range give way to sandy hills closer to the coast. Parts of the city are within the Minami Bōsō Quasi-National Park.

=== Surrounding municipalities ===
Chiba Prefecture

- Isumi
- Kamogawa
- Onjuku
- Ōtaki

=== Climate ===
Katsuura features a humid subtropical climate (Köppen climate classification Cfa) due to its proximity to the Kuroshio Current. Summers and winters are relatively mild and have a narrow annual temperature range. Katsuura, along with Chōshi City, has the coolest summers in Chiba Prefecture. August is the hottest month with an average temperature of 25.9 °C (79 °F), and some days exceed 30 °C (86 °F) degrees. January is the coldest month with an average temperature of 6.8 °C (44 °F).

Climate data for Katsuura (1991−2020 normals, extremes 1906−present)
| Month | Jan | Feb | Mar | Apr | May | Jun | Jul | Aug | Sep | Oct | Nov | Dec | Year |
|---|---|---|---|---|---|---|---|---|---|---|---|---|---|
| Record high °C (°F) | 22.5 (72.5) | 21.7 (71.1) | 24.5 (76.1) | 25.7 (78.3) | 32.3 (90.1) | 32.9 (91.2) | 34.6 (94.3) | 34.9 (94.8) | 34.6 (94.3) | 29.9 (85.8) | 25.9 (78.6) | 22.9 (73.2) | 34.9 (94.8) |
| Mean maximum °C (°F) | 17.1 (62.8) | 17.6 (63.7) | 19.5 (67.1) | 22.0 (71.6) | 24.9 (76.8) | 27.9 (82.2) | 30.5 (86.9) | 31.7 (89.1) | 30.9 (87.6) | 27.0 (80.6) | 23.0 (73.4) | 19.9 (67.8) | 32.4 (90.3) |
| Mean daily maximum °C (°F) | 11.1 (52.0) | 11.4 (52.5) | 13.9 (57.0) | 17.7 (63.9) | 21.2 (70.2) | 23.8 (74.8) | 26.7 (80.1) | 29.0 (84.2) | 26.7 (80.1) | 22.3 (72.1) | 18.1 (64.6) | 13.5 (56.3) | 19.6 (67.3) |
| Daily mean °C (°F) | 6.8 (44.2) | 7.2 (45.0) | 10.0 (50.0) | 14.2 (57.6) | 18.0 (64.4) | 20.8 (69.4) | 23.9 (75.0) | 25.9 (78.6) | 23.5 (74.3) | 18.8 (65.8) | 14.2 (57.6) | 9.3 (48.7) | 16.1 (60.9) |
| Mean daily minimum °C (°F) | 2.9 (37.2) | 3.1 (37.6) | 6.1 (43.0) | 10.5 (50.9) | 14.9 (58.8) | 18.4 (65.1) | 21.7 (71.1) | 23.5 (74.3) | 20.9 (69.6) | 15.8 (60.4) | 10.6 (51.1) | 5.5 (41.9) | 12.8 (55.1) |
| Mean minimum °C (°F) | −1.1 (30.0) | −1.2 (29.8) | 0.9 (33.6) | 3.7 (38.7) | 9.8 (49.6) | 14.2 (57.6) | 18.4 (65.1) | 19.9 (67.8) | 15.9 (60.6) | 10.9 (51.6) | 5.3 (41.5) | 0.8 (33.4) | −1.7 (28.9) |
| Record low °C (°F) | −7.0 (19.4) | −5.5 (22.1) | −4.8 (23.4) | −0.8 (30.6) | 4.3 (39.7) | 8.9 (48.0) | 12.4 (54.3) | 16.0 (60.8) | 12.0 (53.6) | 5.1 (41.2) | −1.5 (29.3) | −4.7 (23.5) | −7.0 (19.4) |
| Average precipitation mm (inches) | 103.9 (4.09) | 103.9 (4.09) | 180.2 (7.09) | 157.5 (6.20) | 164.7 (6.48) | 222.2 (8.75) | 166.3 (6.55) | 107.7 (4.24) | 245.6 (9.67) | 295.2 (11.62) | 165.5 (6.52) | 89.8 (3.54) | 1,998.9 (78.70) |
| Average snowfall cm (inches) | 1 (0.4) | 1 (0.4) | trace | 0 (0) | 0 (0) | 0 (0) | 0 (0) | 0 (0) | 0 (0) | 0 (0) | 0 (0) | 0 (0) | 1 (0.4) |
| Average precipitation days (≥ 1.0 mm) | 6.9 | 7.9 | 11.5 | 10.9 | 10.0 | 11.8 | 9.3 | 6.1 | 11.2 | 11.8 | 9.6 | 7.3 | 114.3 |
| Average snowy days (≥ 1 cm) | 0.2 | 0.3 | 0.1 | 0 | 0 | 0 | 0 | 0 | 0 | 0 | 0 | 0 | 0.6 |
| Average relative humidity (%) | 59 | 62 | 68 | 74 | 80 | 86 | 88 | 85 | 82 | 77 | 71 | 63 | 75 |
| Mean monthly sunshine hours | 174.7 | 152.4 | 161.1 | 176.7 | 181.9 | 132.1 | 158.9 | 217.5 | 156.1 | 136.5 | 140.6 | 161.9 | 1,943.1 |
Source: Japan Meteorological Agency

Due to how cool Katsuura is in the summer, it has been nicknamed as “the city without harsh heat [of 35°C or hotter] for 100 years” (100年猛暑日知らずの街).

== Demographics ==
Per Japanese census data, the population of Katsuura has been gradually decreasing over the past 70 years and is now less than it was a century ago.

Historical population
| Year | Pop. | ±% |
|---|---|---|
| 1920 | 24,369 | — |
| 1930 | 24,850 | +2.0% |
| 1940 | 25,884 | +4.2% |
| 1950 | 33,067 | +27.8% |
| 1960 | 31,141 | −5.8% |
| 1970 | 28,065 | −9.9% |
| 1980 | 25,462 | −9.3% |
| 1990 | 25,334 | −0.5% |
| 2000 | 23,235 | −8.3% |
| 2010 | 20,788 | −10.5% |
| 2020 | 16,927 | −18.6% |

== History ==
The area around Katsuura was part of Isumi District of former Kazusa Province. During the Edo period, most of the area was tenryō under direct control of the Tokugawa shogunate and administered by hatamoto retainers. Katsuura Village was founded on April 1, 1889 with the establishment of the modern municipalities system. The name originated from a location of the same name in the Kii Peninsula. Katsuura was elevated to town status on March 12, 1890. On April 1, 1937, it expanded through annexation of neighboring Toyohama Village. On February 11, 1955, it expanded further through merger with the neighboring town of Okitsu, and the villages of Ueno and Sono. Katsuura was elevated to city status on October 1, 1958.

In August 1931 the English aviator Francis Chichester crashed his seaplane at Katsuura, hitting cables while doing a demonstration flight for the populace. A local crowd pulled him from the wreckage, and he was healed of serious injuries at a nearby hospital.

== Government ==
Katsuura has a mayor-council form of government with a directly elected mayor and a unicameral city council of 14 members. Katsuura contributes one member to the Chiba Prefectural Assembly. In terms of national politics, the city is part of Chiba 11th district of the lower house of the Diet of Japan.

== Economy ==
Katsuura is historically known as a fishing port, and currently has the second largest catch in Chiba Prefecture after Chōshi City. There are nine active fishing ports in Katsuura, with the Port of Katsuura being the largest. The catch of katsuo bonito in 1990 was the largest ever recorded in Japan. Tourism is also important to the economy, and the town has facilities for public beaches, golfing and other leisure activities. Katsuura is home to small-scale sake production, and koshihikari rice, blueberries, kiwifruit, and shiitake mushrooms are also produced in the area.

== Education ==
=== University ===
- International Budo University

=== Primary and secondary schools ===
Katsuura has five public elementary schools and one public middle school operated by the city government. The city does not have a high school.

== Transportation ==
=== Railroad ===
JR East – Sotobō Line

- Katsuura - Ubara - Kazusa-Okitsu - Namegawa Island

=== Highway ===
- National Route 128
- National Route 297

== Sister cities ==
- Nishitokyo, Tokyo, Japan
- (Japan) Nachikatsuura, Wakayama
- (Japan) Katsuura, Tokushima

== Noted people from Katsuura ==
- Yoshihiro Maru, baseball player
- Eisuke Mori, politician
- Hitomi Takagaki, writer

== Gallery ==
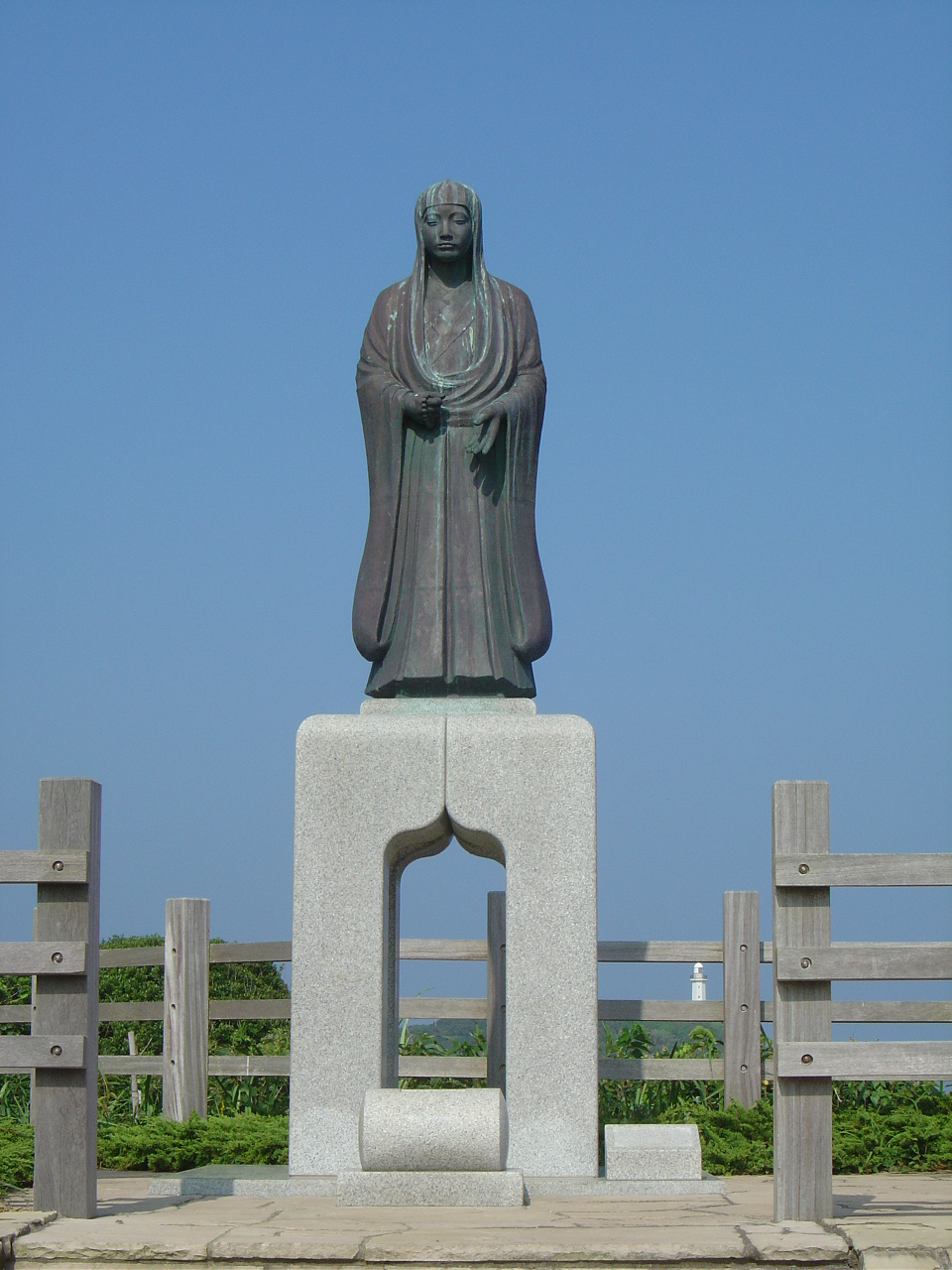
Bronze statue of Youjuin in Cape Hachiman.

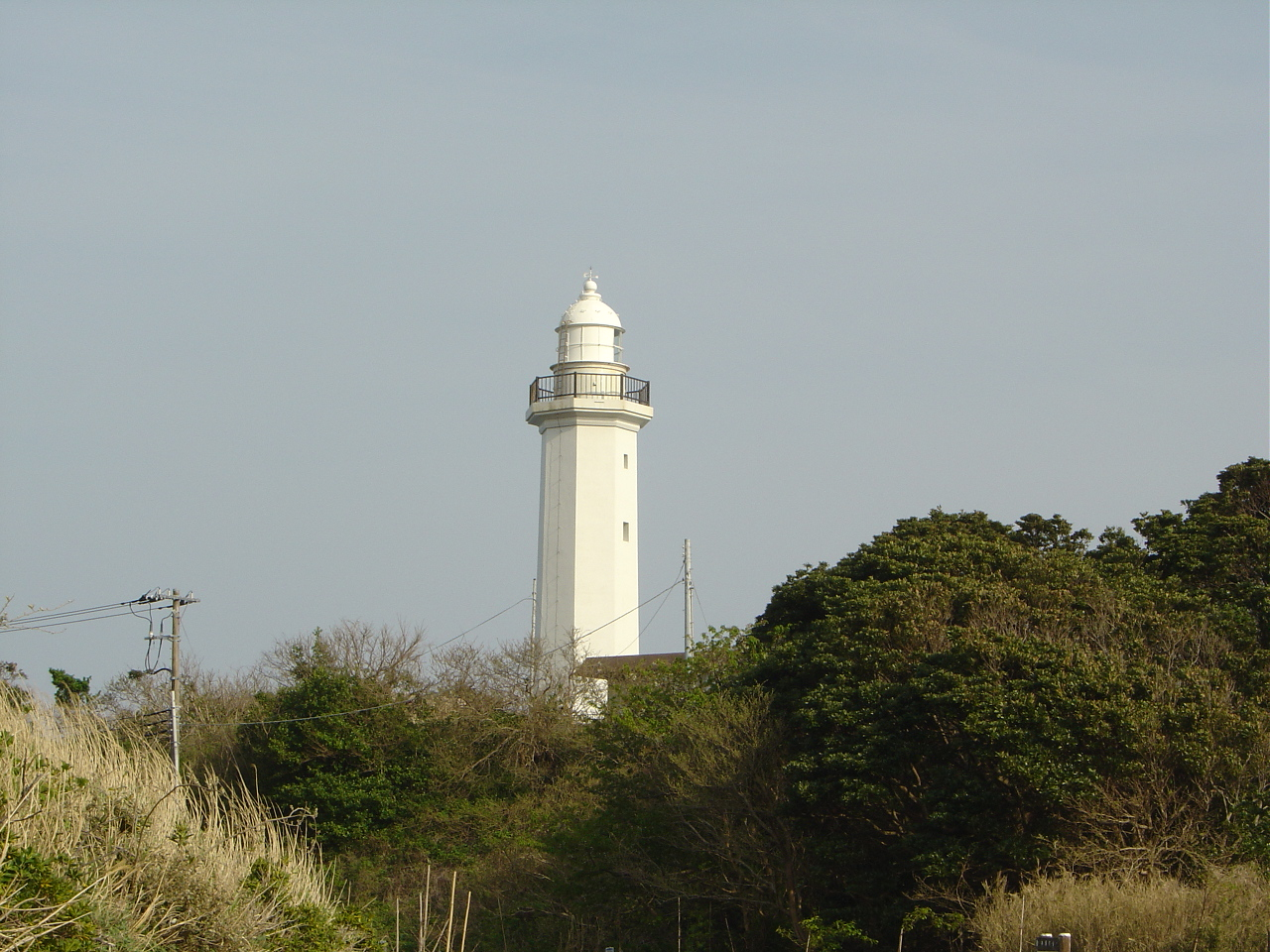
Katsuura lighthouse

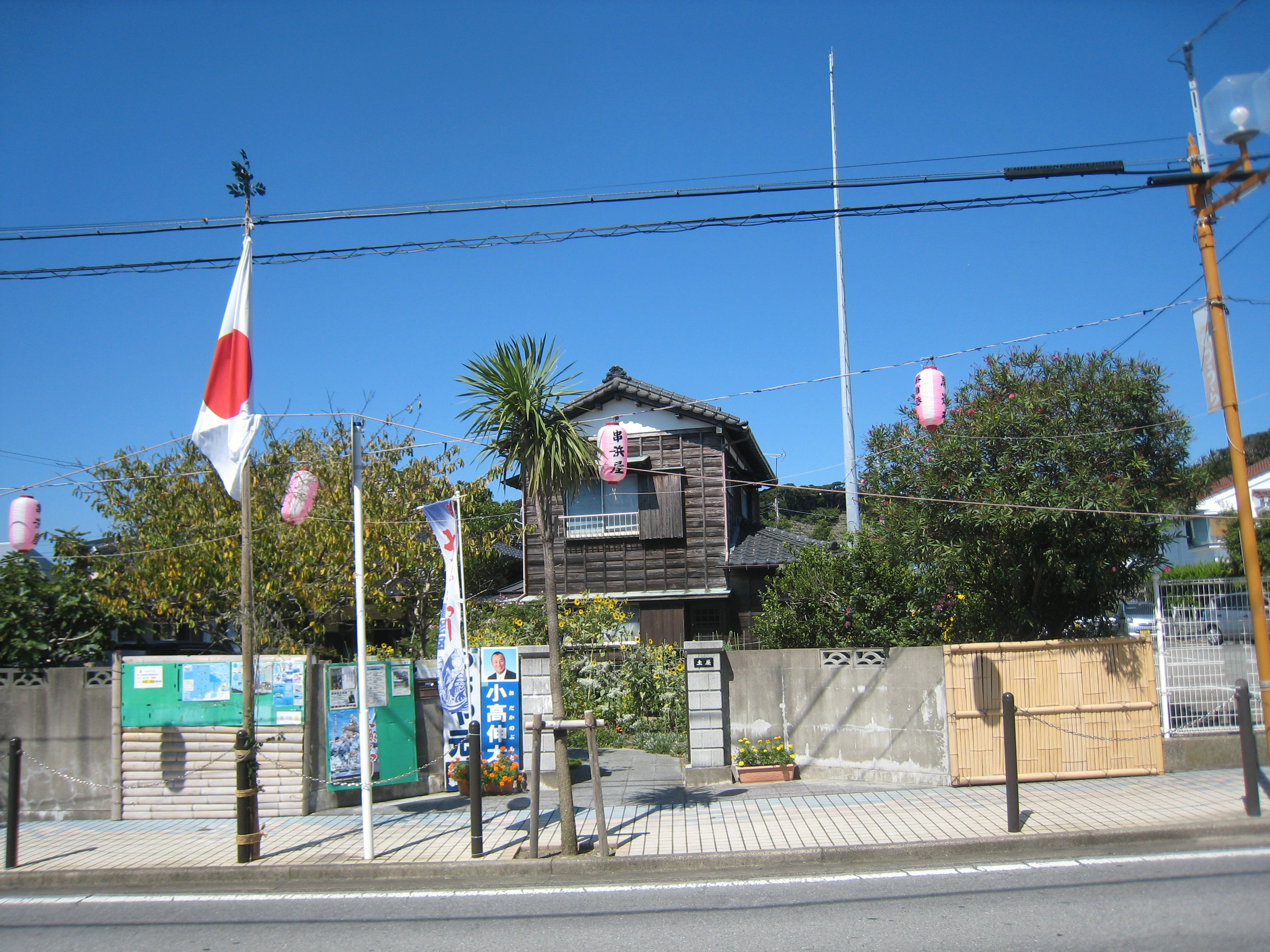
A street in Katsuura

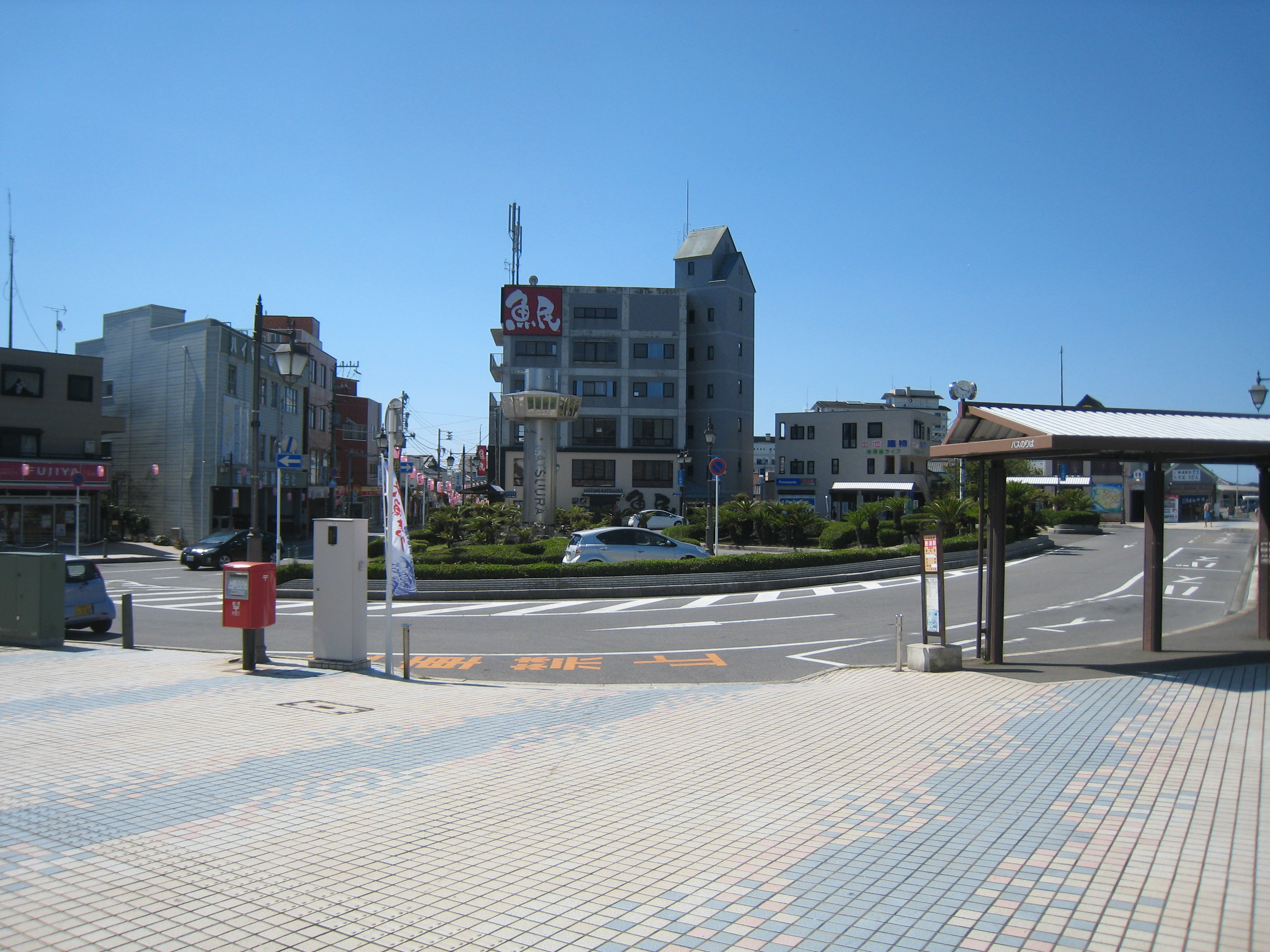
A street in Katsuura

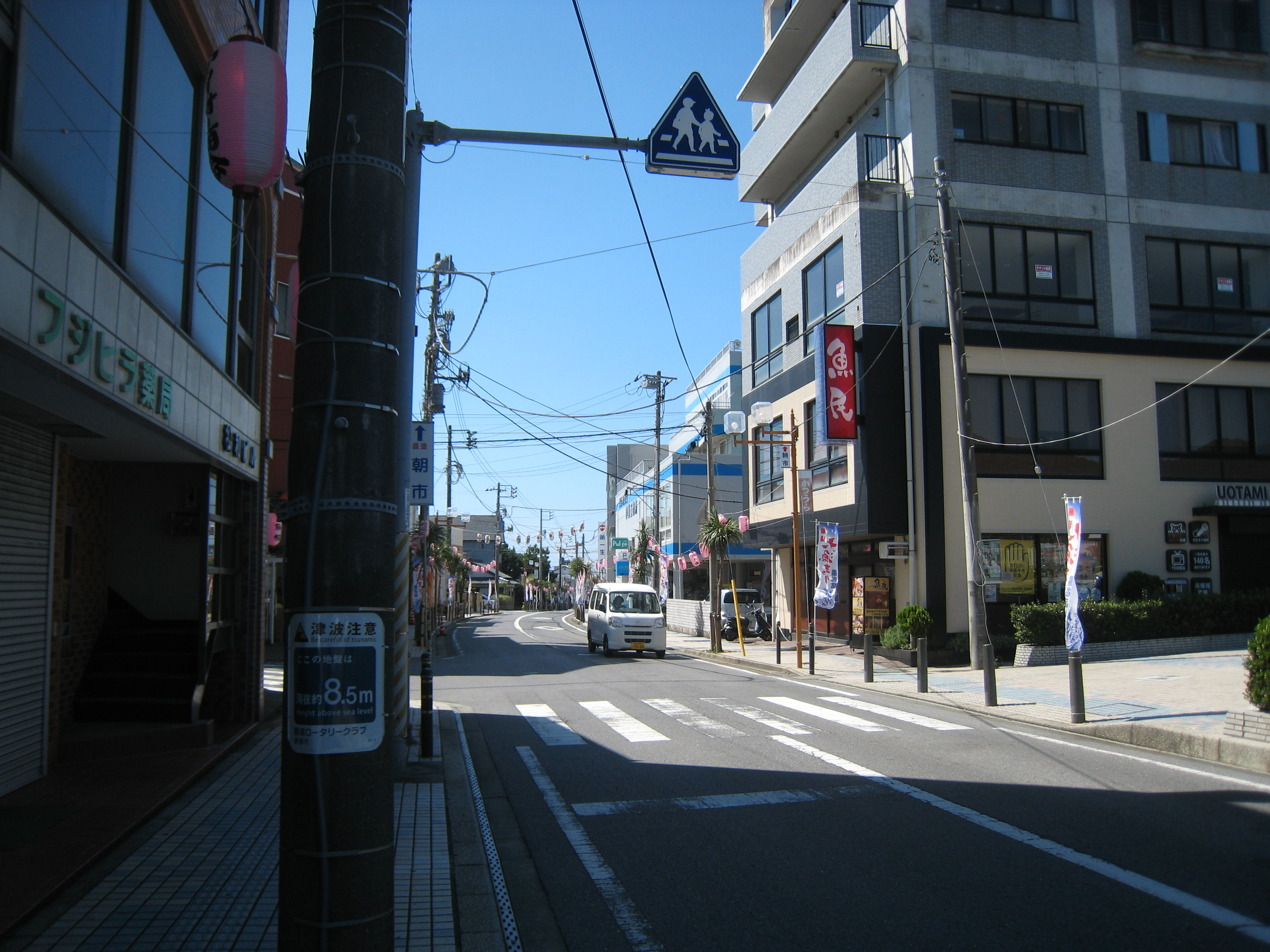
A street in Katsuura

== Katsuura Beach ==
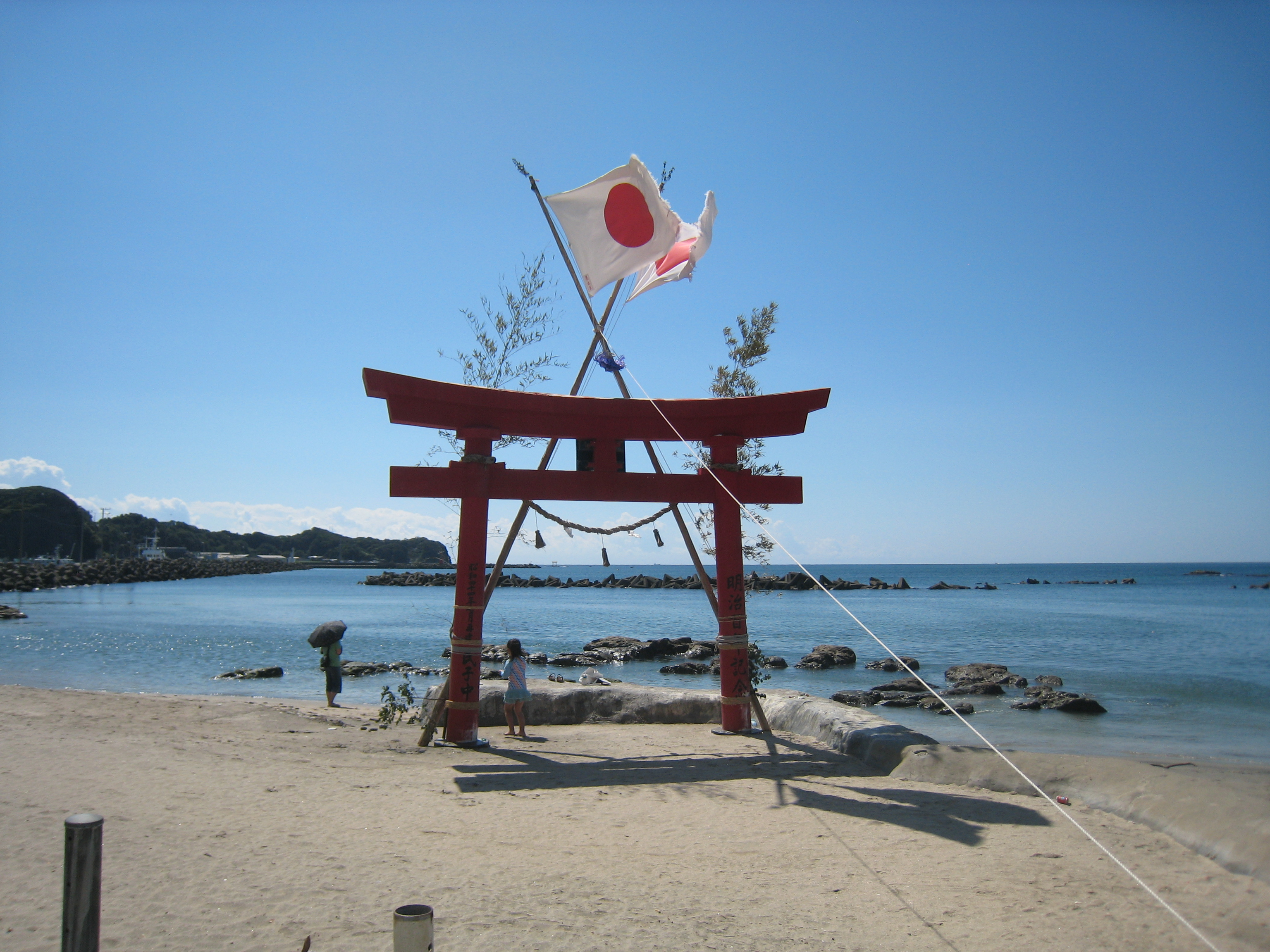
Shinto shrine on Katsuura beach

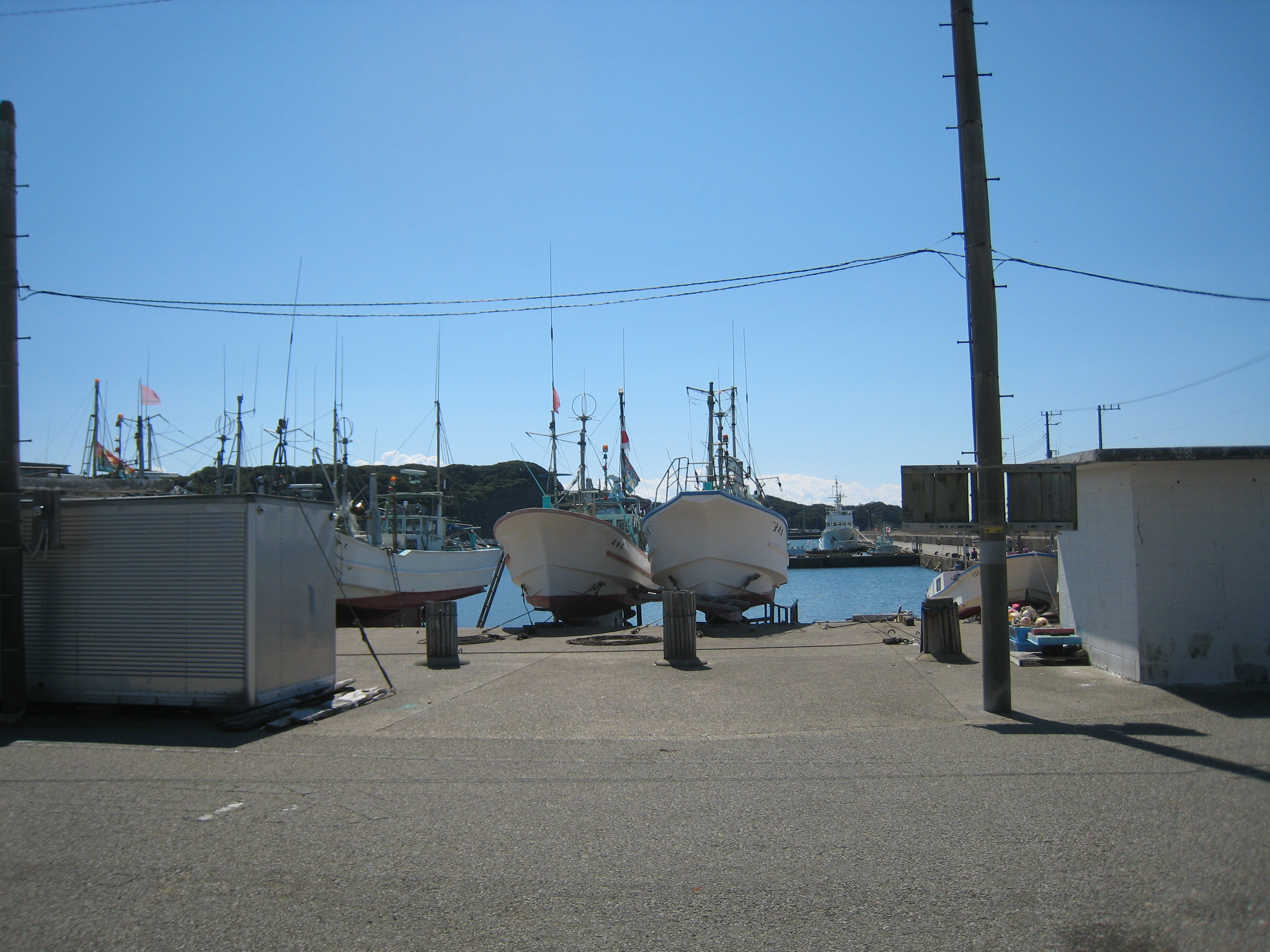
Katsuura shipyard

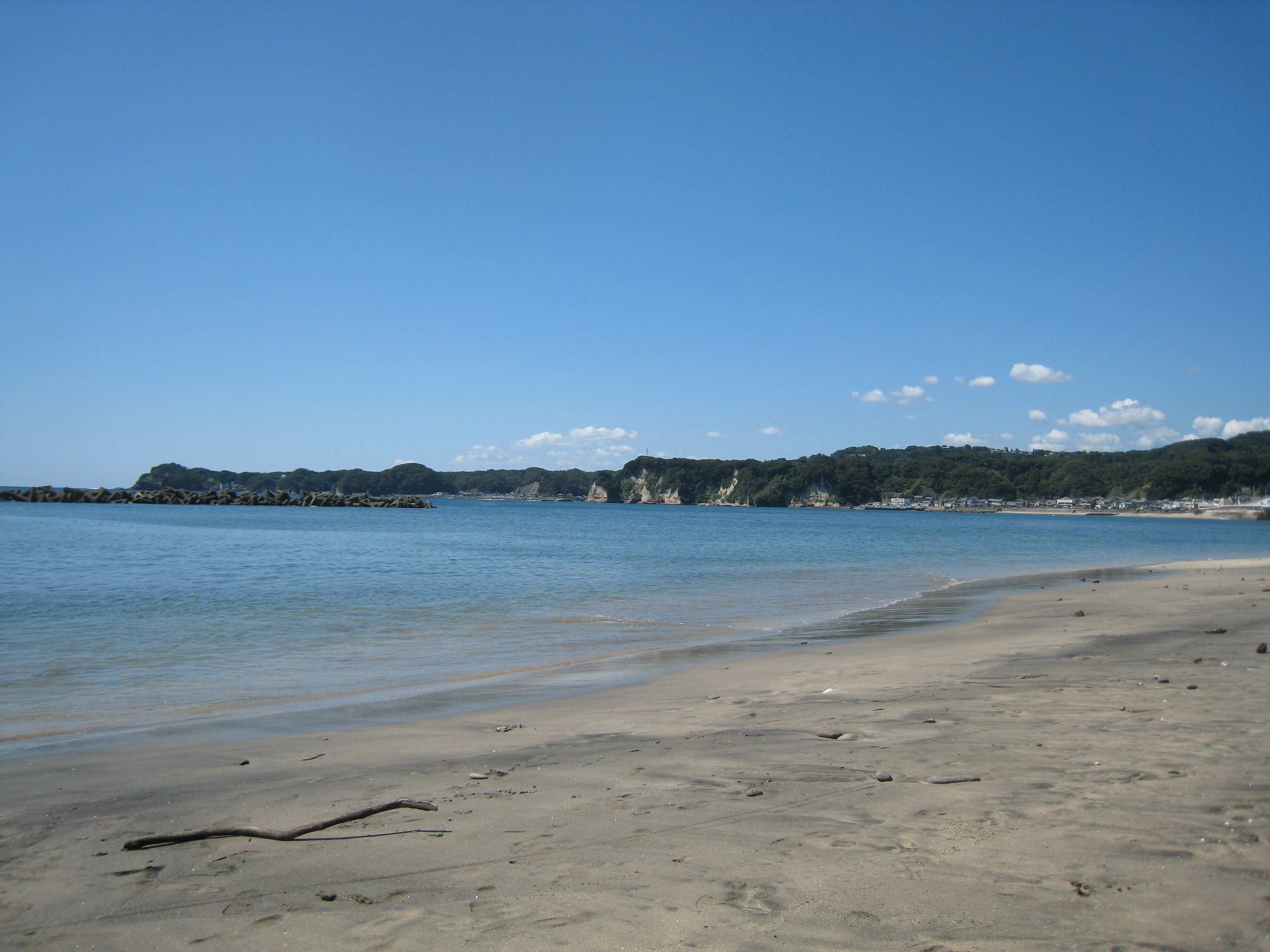
Katsuura beach

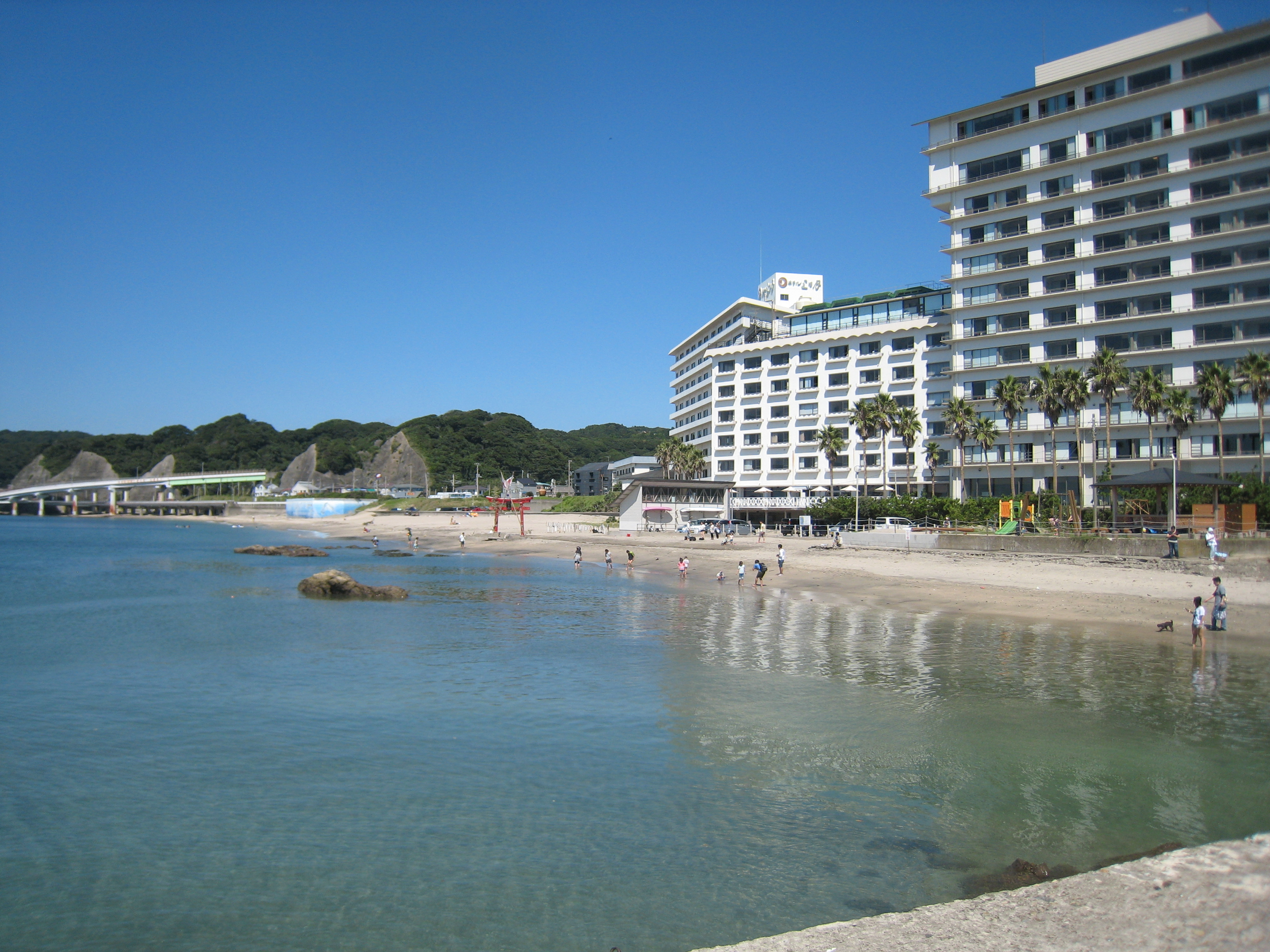
Katsuura beach
