= Wakashio =

Japanese limited express train service

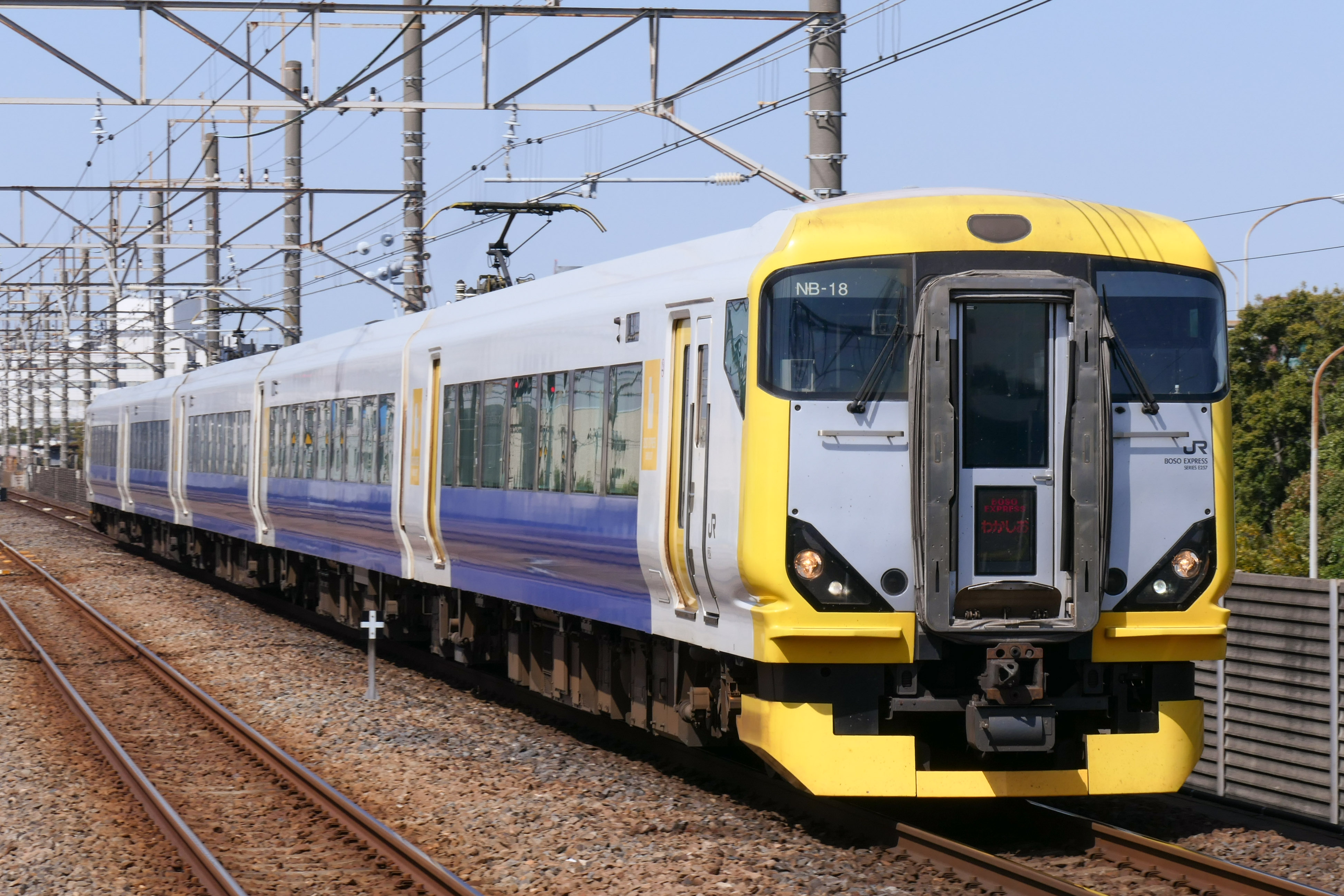
- An E257-500 series unit on a Keiyo Line Wakashio service

Overview
- Service type: Limited express
- Locale: Chiba Prefecture
- First service: 15 July 1972
- Current operator: JR East
- Former operator: JNR

Route
- Termini: Tokyo; Awa-Kamogawa
- Distance travelled: 132.5 km (82.3 mi)
- Service frequency: 12 return trips daily
- Lines used: Keiyo Line, Sotobo Line, Chūō Line, Sōbu Line

On-board services
- Catering facilities: Trolley service

Technical
- Rolling stock: E257-500 series EMU
- Track gauge: 1,067 mm (3 ft 6 in)
- Electrification: 1,500 V DC overhead
- Operating speed: 120 km/h (75 mph)

The Wakashio (わかしお) is a limited express train service in Japan operated by the East Japan Railway Company (JR East). It runs from Tokyo to Kazusa-Ichinomiya and Awa-Kamogawa on the Bōsō Peninsula in Chiba Prefecture.

== Station stops ==
Wakashio services operate via the Keiyo Line and Sotobo Line, between Tokyo and Awa-Kamogawa. Some services terminate at Kazusa-Ichinomiya, and some services operate as "Local" all-stations services between Katsuura and Awa-Kamogawa. As of March 2018, all trains pass through Ubara and Awa-Amatsu stations. Trains currently stop at the following stations:

Tokyo - Kaihimmakuhari※ - Soga - Toke※ - Ōami - Mobara - Kazusa-Ichinomiya - Ōhara - Onjuku - Katsuura - Kazusa-Okitsu※ - Awa-Kominato - Awa-Kamogawa
※:Some trains pass through these stations.

Shinjuku Wakashio services operate to/from Shinjuku instead of Tokyo. These services operate over the Chūō Line and Sōbu Line on weekends "when there is heavy use". As of March 2024, trains no longer stop at Akihabara or Tsudanuma. Trains currently stop at the following stations:

Shinjuku - Kinshichō - Funabashi - Chiba - Soga ... Awa-Kamogawa

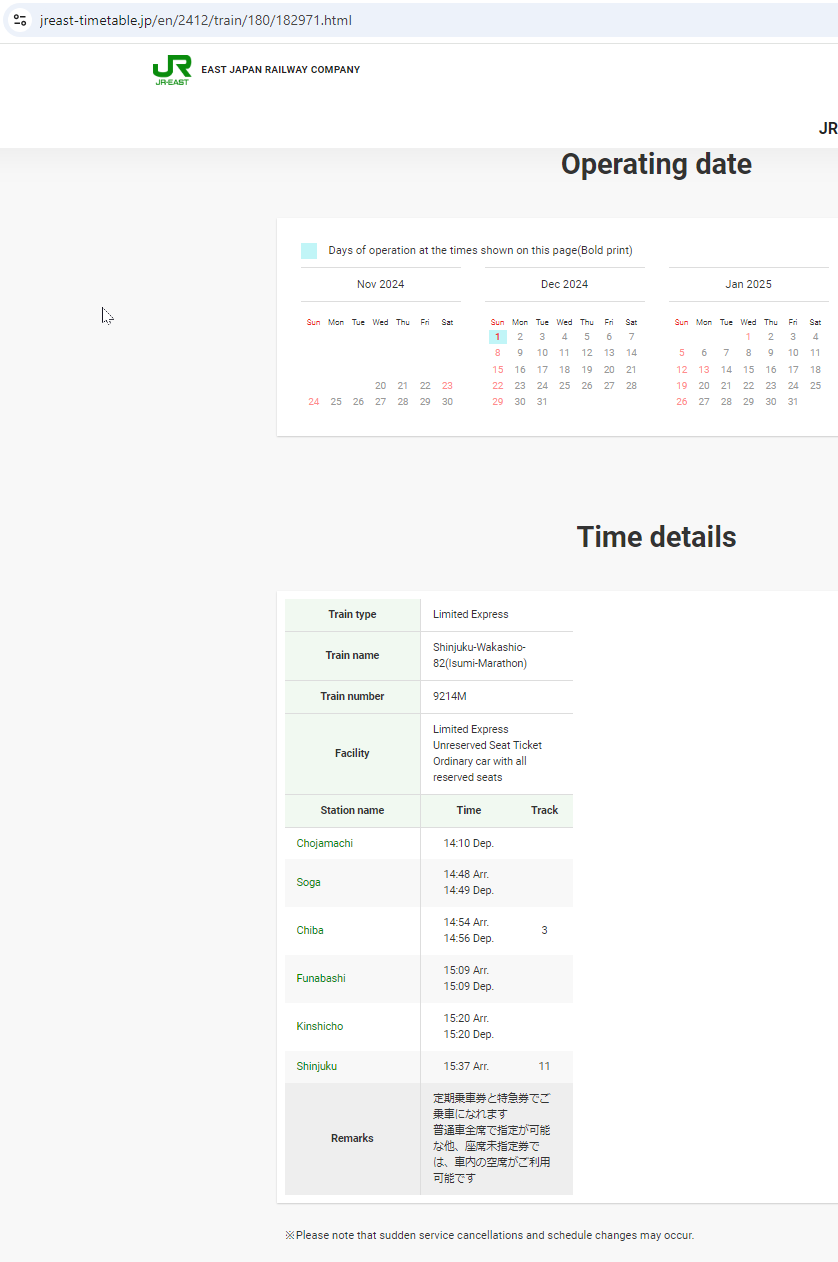

From April 2016 until March 2024, Shinjuku Wakashio services, operating mainly on weekends, stopped at the following stations between Shinjuku and Soga.

Shinjuku - Akihabara - Kinshichō - Funabashi - Tsudanuma - Chiba - Soga ... Awa-Kamogawa

== Rolling stock ==
- E257-500 series 5-car EMUs (since 16 October 2004)

Wakashio services are operated using Makuhari-based 5-car E257-500 series EMU formations. The E257-500 series formations have no Green (business class) cars.

=== Past ===
- 183 series 9-car EMUs (15 July 1972 – October 2004)
- 255 series 9-car EMUs (2 July 1993 – 15 March 2024)
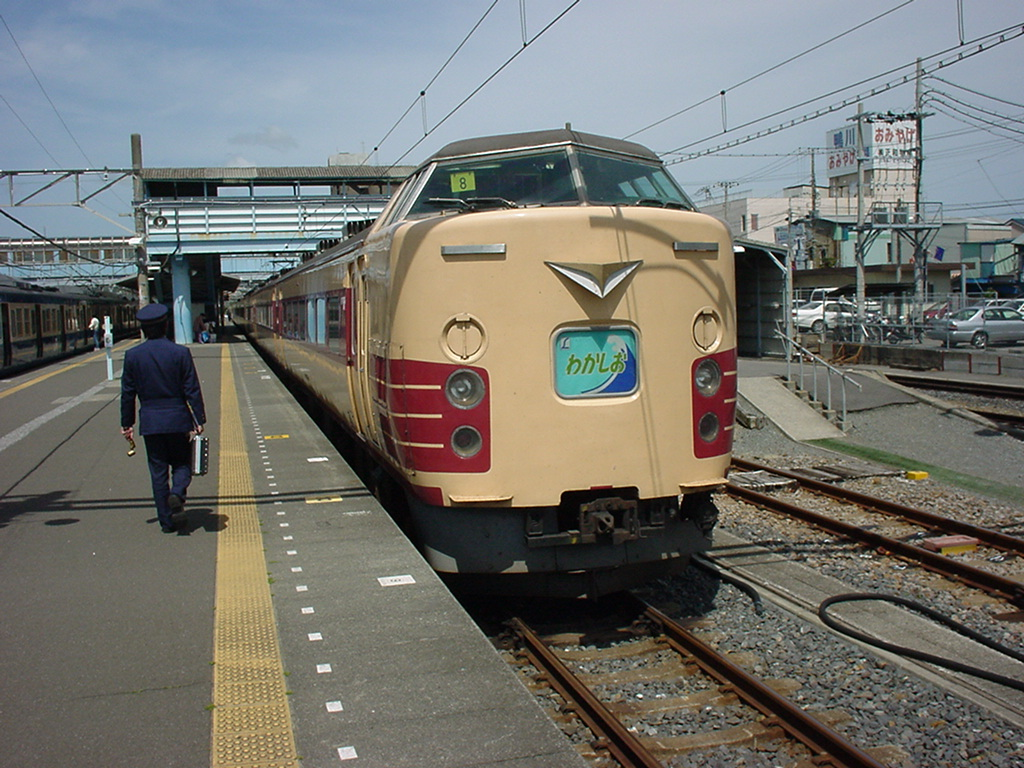
A 183 series EMU in May 2002

== Formations ==
Trains are formed as shown below, with car 1 at the Tokyo end.

=== 5-car E257 series ===
| Car No. | 1 | 2 | 3 | 4 | 5 |
|---|---|---|---|---|---|
| Numbering | KuHa E257-500 | MoHa E257-1500 | MoHa E257-500 | MoHa E257-500 | KuHa E257-500 |
| Accommodation | Reserved | Reserved | Reserved | Reserved | Reserved |

== Past formations ==
Trains were originally formed of 9-car 183 series and 255 series EMUs and 10-car E257-500 series EMU with formed as shown below, including one Green car, as shown below.

=== 9-car 183 series ===
| Car No. | 1 | 2 | 3 | 4 | 5 | 6 | 7 | 8 | 9 |
|---|---|---|---|---|---|---|---|---|---|
| Accommodation | Reserved | Reserved | Reserved | Green | Non-reserved | Non-reserved | Non-reserved | Non-reserved | Non-reserved |

- All cars except the Green car were non-reserved for Ohayo Wakashio and Hometown Wakashio services.

=== 9-car 255 series ===
| Car No. | 1 | 2 | 3 | 4 | 5 | 6 | 7 | 8 | 9 |
|---|---|---|---|---|---|---|---|---|---|
| Numbering | KuHa 254 | MoHa 254 | MoHa 255 | SaRo 255 | SaHa 254 | SaHa 255 | MoHa 254 | MoHa 255 | KuHa 255 |
| Accommodation | Reserved | Reserved | Reserved | Green | Reserved | Non-reserved | Non-reserved | Non-reserved | Non-reserved |

=== 5+5-car E257 series ===
| Car No. | 1 | 2 | 3 | 4 | 5 | 6 | 7 | 8 | 9 | 10 |
|---|---|---|---|---|---|---|---|---|---|---|
| Numbering | KuHa E256-500 | MoHa E257-1500 | MoHa E256-500 | MoHa E257-500 | KuHa E257-500 | KuHa E256-500 | MoHa E257-1500 | MoHa E256-500 | MoHa E257-500 | KuHa E257-500 |
| Accommodation | Non-reserved | Non-reserved | Non-reserved | Reserved | Reserved | Reserved | Reserved | Reserved | Non-reserved | Non-reserved |

== History ==
The Wakashio service commenced on 15 July 1972, using 183 series EMUs. Evening Hometown Wakashio services for commuters were introduced from 16 March 1991, operating from Tokyo to Kazusa-Ichinomiya. New 255 series EMUs were introduced from 2 July 1993, initially branded as View Wakashio. Morning Oyaho Wakashio services for commuters were introduced from 3 December 1994, operating from Kazusa-Ichinomiya to Tokyo. New E257-500 series EMUs were introduced from 16 October 2004, displacing the remaining 183 series trainsets. From the start of the revised timetable on 10 December 2005, Wakashio services were made entirely no-smoking.

The opening of the Tokyo Bay Aqua-Line road across the Tokyo Bay in 1997 saw increased competition from long-distance bus services offering cheaper fares, resulting in decreasing ridership figures on the Wakashio services. From the start of the 15 March 2014 timetable revision, the number of services was reduced from 15 to 13 return workings daily.

With the timetable revision on 16 March 2024, the number of Wakashio services is scheduled to reduce again and all remaining regular services will only operate as 5-car formations using E257 series trains. As a result, 9- and 10-car trainsets will cease to run on these services. In addition, services to/from Shinjuku will only operate on selected Saturdays and holidays.

== See also ==
- List of named passenger trains of Japan
