= Sotobō Line =

Railway line in Chiba prefecture, Japan

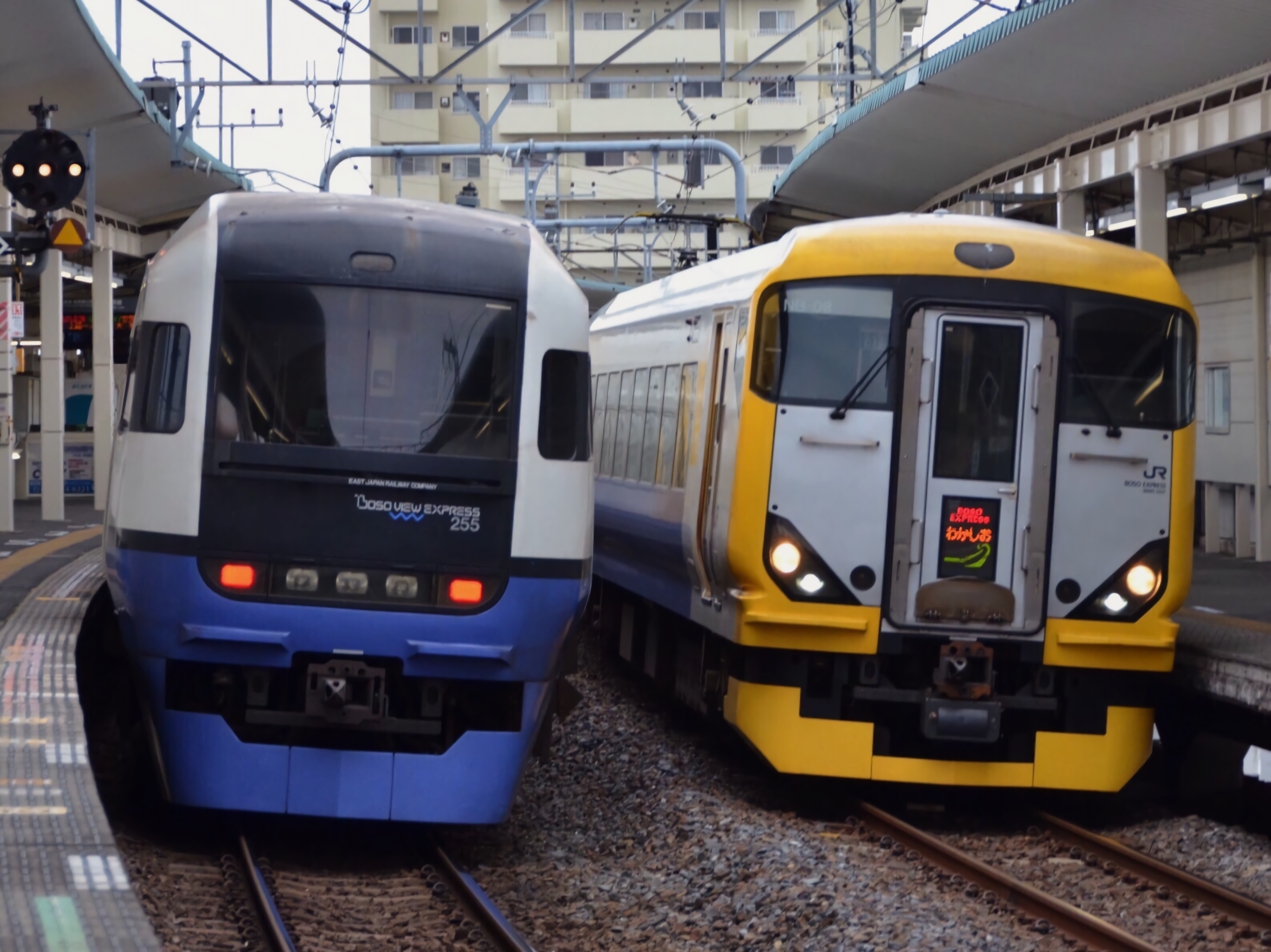
- Sotobō Line Wakashio limited express service, November 2017

Overview
- Locale: Chiba Prefecture
- Termini: Chiba; Awa-Kamogawa
- Stations: 27

Service
- Type: Heavy rail
- Operator: JR East
- Depot: Chiba

History
- Opened: 20 January 1896; 130 years ago

Technical
- Line length: 93.3 km (58.0 mi)
- Track gauge: 1,067 mm (3 ft 6 in)
- Operating speed: 110 km/h (70 mph)
Route map

The Sotobō Line (外房線, Sotobō-sen) is a railway line in Japan operated by the East Japan Railway Company (JR East) adjacent to the Pacific Ocean, on the eastern (i.e., outer) side of the Bōsō Peninsula. It connects Chiba Station in Chiba to Awa-Kamogawa Station in Kamogawa, passing through Ōamishirasato, Mobara, Chōsei, Ichinomiya, Isumi, Onjuku, and Katsuura. The line is connected to the Uchibō Line at both ends. South of Kazusa-Ichinomiya is single track, and north of Kazusa-Ichinomiya is double track.

== Services ==
In addition to local services, limited express and Rapid services run on this line.

- Limited Express Wakashio

Tokyo – (Keiyō Line) – Soga – Awa-Kamogawa
(some operate as all-stations "Local" services between Katsuura and Awa-Kamogawa

- Rapid
  - Kurihama – (Yokosuka Line) – Tokyo – (Sōbu Line (Rapid)) – Soga – Kazusa-Ichinomiya
  - Tokyo – (Keiyō Line) – Soga – Ōami – Kazusa-Ichinomiya (some to/from Katsuura, or Narutō on the Tōgane Line)
    - Commuter Rapid services through to/from the Keiyō Line also used to operate, but they have been discontinued as of 16 March 2024.

== Station list ==
Legend

- ● : All trains stop
- (●) : Some trains stop
- | : All trains pass

Notes

- Local trains stop at every station.

Station	Japanese	Distance (km)	to/from Keiyō Line		to/from Sōbu Line (Rapid) and Yokosuka Line		Transfers	Location (in Chiba)
Station	Japanese	Distance (km)	Keiyō Line Rapid	Limited express Wakashio	Sōbu Line Rapid	Limited express Shinjuku Wakashio (Weekends only)	Transfers	Location (in Chiba)
Chiba	千葉	0.0			●	●	Sōbu Line (Rapid) (JO28) (some through services) Chūō-Sōbu Line (JB39) ■ Sōbu Main Line ■ Narita Line ■ Uchibō Line Chiba Urban Monorail Line 1, Line 2 Keisei Chiba Line (Keisei Chiba: KS59)	Chūō-ku, Chiba
Hon-Chiba	本千葉	1.4			●	|	■ Uchibō Line	Chūō-ku, Chiba
Soga	蘇我	3.8	●	●	●	●	Keiyō Line (some through services) ■ Uchibō Line	Chūō-ku, Chiba
Kamatori	鎌取	8.8	●	|	●	|		Midori-ku, Chiba
Honda	誉田	12.6	●	|	●	|		Midori-ku, Chiba
Toke	土気	18.1	●	(●)	●	|		Midori-ku, Chiba
Ōami	大網	22.9	●	●	●	●	■ Togane Line	Ōamishirasato
Nagata	永田	25.3	(●)	|	|	|		Ōamishirasato
Honnō	本納	27.7	(●)	|	|	|		Mobara
Shin-Mobara	新茂原	31.4	(●)	|	|	|		Mobara
Mobara	茂原	34.3	●	●	●	●		Mobara
Yatsumi	八積	38.9	(●)	|	|	|		Chōsei
Kazusa-Ichinomiya	上総一ノ宮	43.0	●	●	●	●		Ichinomiya
Torami	東浪見	46.2	●	|		|		Ichinomiya
Taitō	太東	49.3	●	|		|		Isumi
Chōjamachi	長者町	52.1	●	|		|		Isumi
Mikado	三門	53.7	●	|		|		Isumi
Ōhara	大原	57.2	●	●		●	■ Isumi Line	Isumi
Namihana	浪花	60.5	●	|		|		Isumi
Onjuku	御宿	65.4	●	●		●		Onjuku
Katsuura	勝浦	70.9	●	●		●		Katsuura
Ubara	鵜原	74.5		|		|		Katsuura
Kazusa-Okitsu	上総興津	77.2		(●)		●		Katsuura
Namegawa-Island	行川アイランド	80.5		|		|		Katsuura
Awa-Kominato	安房小湊	84.3		●		●		Kamogawa
Awa-Amatsu	安房天津	87.7		|		|		Kamogawa
Awa-Kamogawa	安房鴨川	93.3		●		●	■ Uchibō Line (some through services)	Kamogawa

== Rolling stock ==
Local service

- E131 series 2-car EMUs (since 13 March 2021)
- 209-2000/2100 series 4/6-car EMUs

Keiyō Line through service

Between Soga and Katsuura:

- 209-500 series 10-car EMUs
- E233-5000 series 6+4-car and 10-car EMUs

Sōbu Line (Rapid) through service

Between Chiba and Kazusa-Ichinomiya:

- E235-1000 series 11+4-car EMUs (since 21 December 2020)

Wakashio and Shinjuku Wakashio Limited Express

- E257-500 series 5-car EMUs

=== Former rolling stock ===
- 113 series EMUs (Sotobō Line local services, until 2011)
- 211-3000 series 5-car EMUs (Sotobō Line local services from 21 October 2006 to spring 2013)
- E217 series 11+4-car EMUs (until 15 March 2025)

== History ==
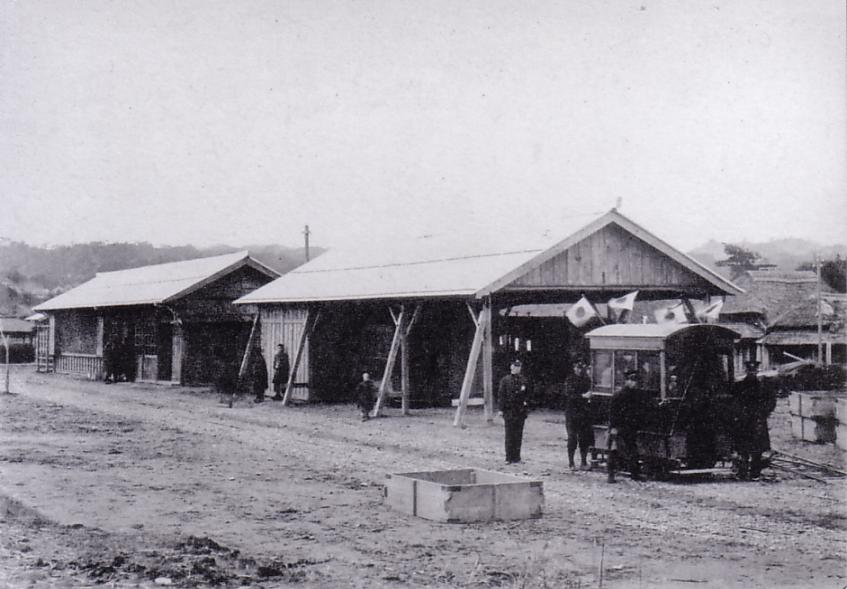
Mobara handcar line

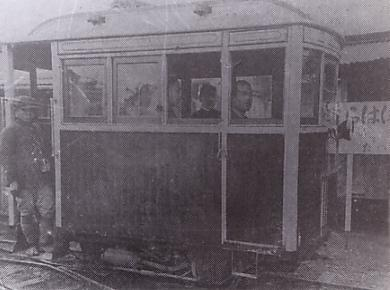
A former handcar converted with a petrol engine at Ohara

The Boso Railway opened the Chiba to Oami section in 1896, extending the line to Kazusa-Ichinomiya the following year and to Ohara in 1899. The company was nationalised in 1907. The extension to Katsuura opened in 1913, to Kazusa-Okitsu in 1927, and Awa-Kamogawa in 1929.

A new tunnel and associated deviation was opened at Toke in 1954 to improve the loading gauge of the line. The Chiba to Soga section was double-tracked between 1960 and 1963, extended to Nagata between 1972 and 1974, with CTC signalling being commissioned between Soga and Awa-Kamogawa in 1974. The line to Kazusa-Ichinomiya was double-tracked between 1980 and 1986, with the Onjuku to Katsuura section double-tracked in 1995, and the Torami to Chojamachi section the following year. The entire line was electrified in 1968, and freight services ceased between 1982 and 1987.

=== Former connecting lines ===
- Mobara Station: The Mobara Town Council operated a 9 km (5.6 mi), 610 mm (2 ft) gauge handcar line to Tai Muko between 1909 and 1924. The council then decided to build a railway to connect to the Kominato Line. 12 km (7.5 mi) of 1,067 mm (3 ft 6 in) gauge line was opened as far as Okuno between 1930 and 1933, the first 6 km (3.7 mi) following the handcar line alignment. Poor patronage and economic circumstances led to the line being closed in 1939.
- Ohara Station: The Chiba Prefectural Government opened a 16 km (9.9 mi), 610 mm (2 ft) gauge handcar line to Otaki in 1912. A railcar was converted to petrol engine power in 1922. The line closed in 1927 to allow for the construction of the Isumi Line, which opened on the same alignment in 1930.

== Accidents ==
On 8 May 2020, at 3:55 pm, the front carriage of a local service derailed between Awa-Kamogawa and Awa-Amatsu stations. Around 20 passengers and crew were on board the train (a 209 Series) when it derailed. One person was taken to a hospital.
