= Katsuura Station =

Railway station in Katsuura, Chiba Prefecture, Japan

Katsuura Station 勝浦駅
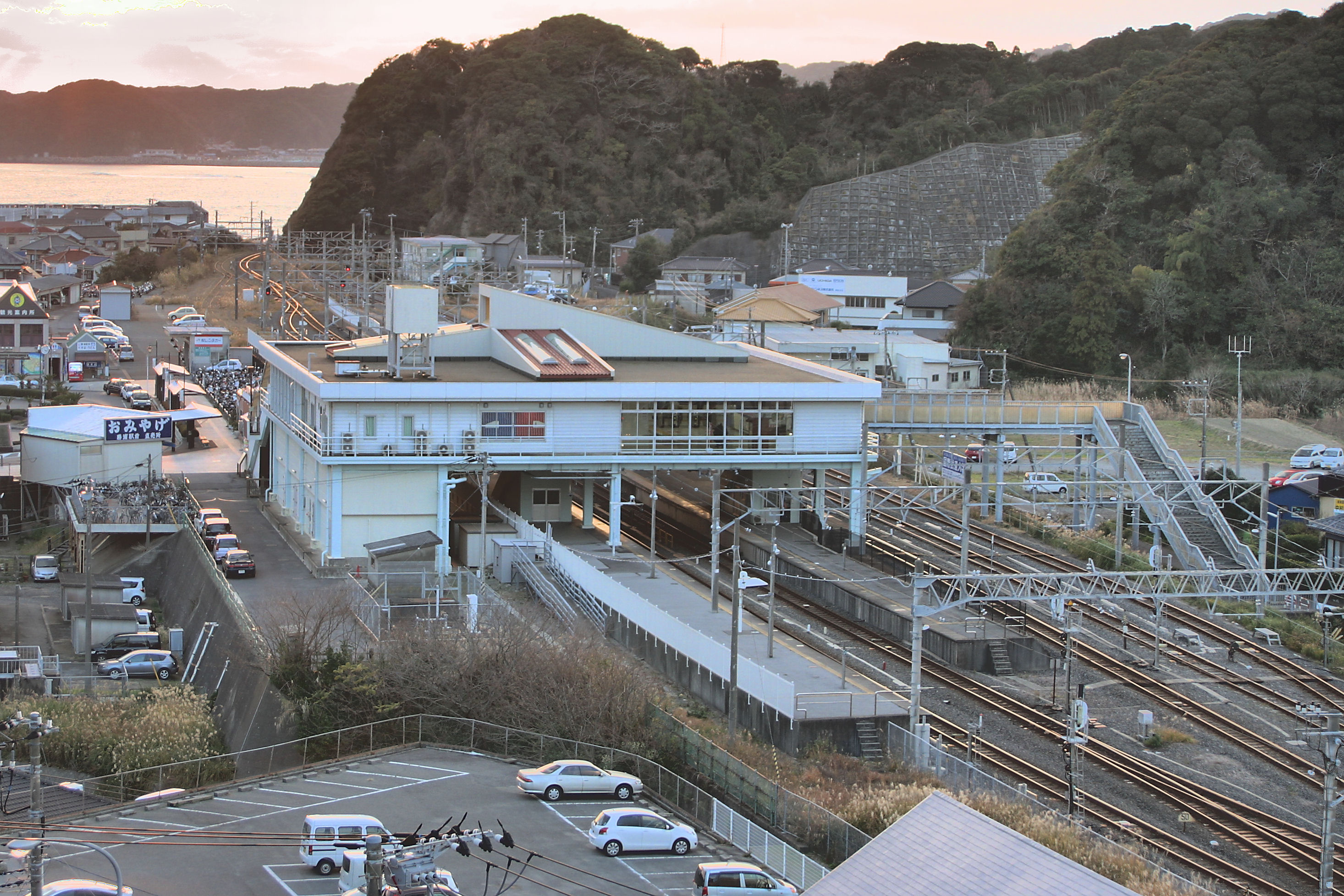
- Katsuura Station in December 2011

General information
- Location: Tona 254, Katsuura-shi, Chiba-ken 299-5225; Japan
- Coordinates: 35.1529°N 140.3120°E
- Operator: JR East
- Line: ■ Sotobō Line
- Distance: 70.9 km from Soga
- Platforms: 2 island platforms

Other information
- Status: Staffed ( Midori no Madoguchi)
- Website: Official website

History
- Opened: 20 June 1913; 113 years ago

Passengers
- FY2019: 946

Services
Preceding station	JR East	Following station
Onjuku towards Tokyo	Wakashio	Kazusa-Okitsu towards Awa-Kamogawa
Onjuku towards Soga	Sotobō Line Keiyō Rapid	Terminus
Onjuku towards Soga or Chiba	Sotobō Line Local	Ubara towards Awa-Kamogawa
Location
- Location within Chiba Prefecture Location within Japan

Katsuura Station (勝浦駅, Katsuura-eki) is a passenger railway station located in the city of Katsuura, Chiba Prefecture, Japan operated by the East Japan Railway Company (JR East).

== Lines ==
Katsuura Station is served by the Sotobō Line, and is located 70.9 km (44.1 mi) from the official starting point of the line at Chiba Station.

== Station Layout ==
Katsuura Station consists of two island platforms serving three tracks. Track 1 is used for bidirectional traffic. The station has a Midori no Madoguchi staffed ticket office.

=== Platform ===
1	■ Sotobō Line	For Awa-Kamogawa, Tokyo, Chiba
2	■ Sotobō Line	For Awa-Kamogawa, Awa-Kominato, Tokyo, Chiba
3	■ Sotobō Line	For Mobara, Soga, Chiba

== History ==
Katsuura Station was opened on 20 June 1913. The current elevated station building was completed on 1 July 1982. Katsuura Station was absorbed into the JR East network upon the privatization of the Japan National Railways (JNR) on 1 April 1987.

== Passenger statistics ==
In fiscal 2019, the station was used by an average of 946 passengers daily (boarding passengers only).

== Surrounding area ==
- Morning market (朝市)
- Katsuura fishing port
- International Budo University
- National Route 128
- National Route 297

== See also ==
- List of railway stations in Japan
