= Awa-Kamogawa Station =

Railway station in Kamogawa, Chiba Prefecture, Japan

Awa-Kamogawa Station 安房鴨川駅
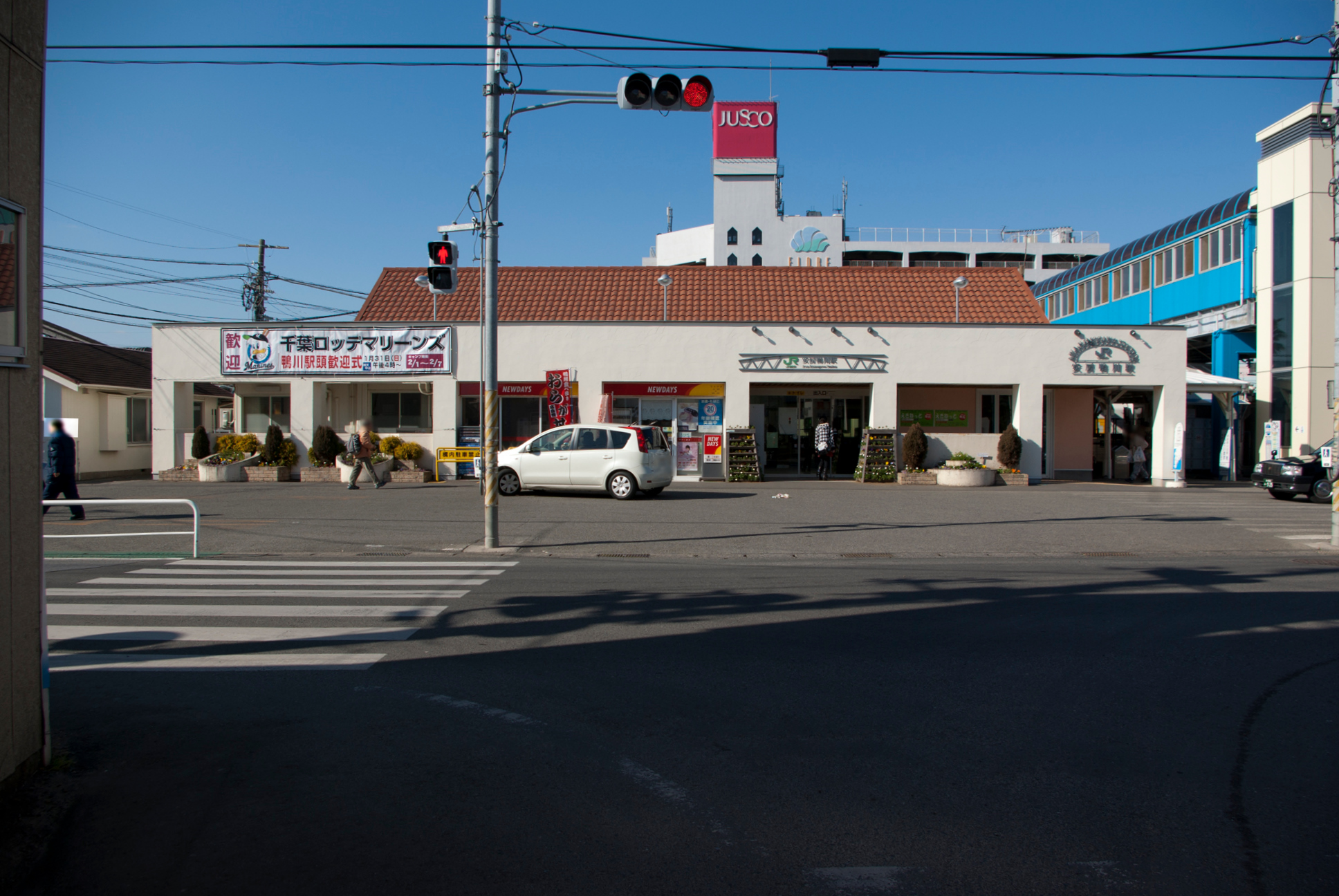
- Awa-Kamogawa Station

General information
- Location: Yokosuka, Kamogawa-shi, Chiba-ken 296-0001; Japan
- Coordinates: 35°6′27.42″N 140°6′13.44″E
- Operator: JR East
- Lines: ■ Sotobō Line; ■ Uchibō Line
- Distance: 119.4 km from Soga
- Platforms: 2 side platforms

Other information
- Status: Staffed (Midori no Madoguchi )
- Website: Official website

History
- Opened: 11 July 1925; 101 years ago

Passengers
- FY2019: 1290

Services
Preceding station	JR East	Following station
Futomi towards Soga or Chiba	Uchibō Line Local	Terminus
Awa-Kominato towards Tokyo	Wakashio	Terminus
Awa-Amatsu towards Soga or Chiba	Sotobō Line Local	Terminus
Location
- Location within Chiba Prefecture Location within Japan

Awa-Kamogawa Station (安房鴨川駅, Awa-Kamogawa-eki) is a junction passenger railway station in the city of Kamogawa, Chiba Prefecture Japan, operated by the East Japan Railway Company (JR East).

== Lines ==
Awa-Kamogawa Station is served by the Sotobō Line and Uchibō Line, and forms the terminating point of both lines. It is located 97.3 km (60.5 mi) from the northern terminus of the Sotobō Line at Chiba Station and 119.4 km (74.2 mi) from the northern terminus of the Uchibō Line at Soga Station.

== Station layout ==
The station consists of one island platform serving two tracks for the Sotobō Line, and one side platform serving the Uchibō Line. The station shares the distinction with Kamaishi Station and Kagoshima Station of being one of only three stations in Japan serving as the terminus of two lines, with only up traffic. The station building is on the east side. There is also a west exit near to Aeon and Kamogawa City Hall connected to east one with a bridge.

=== Platforms ===
1/2	■ Sotobō Line	for Katsuura, Kazusa-Ichinomiya, Chiba, and Tokyo
1/2	■ Limited express Wakashio	for Kaihimmakuhari and Tokyo
1/2	■ Limited express Shinjuku Wakashio	for Kinshichō and Shinjuku
3	■ Uchibō Line	for Tateyama, Kazusa-Minato, Kisarazu, and Tokyo

== History ==
Awa-Kamogawa Station opened on 11 July 1925, as a station on the Hōjō Line. The Hōjō Line was merged into the Bōsō Line in 1929, and the Bōsō Line itself was divided into the Bōsō-East and Bōsō-West Lines on 1 April 1933. These lines were renamed on 15 July 1972, to the Sotobō Line and Uchibō Line. The station was absorbed into the JR East network upon the privatization of the Japan National Railways (JNR) on 1 April 1987. A new station building was completed in August 2006.

== Passenger statistics ==
In fiscal 2018, the station was used by an average of 1290 passengers daily (boarding passengers only).

== Surrounding area ==
- Kamogawa city Hall
- National Route 128

== See also ==
- List of railway stations in Japan
