= Soga Station =

Railway station in Chiba, Japan

Soga Station 蘇我駅
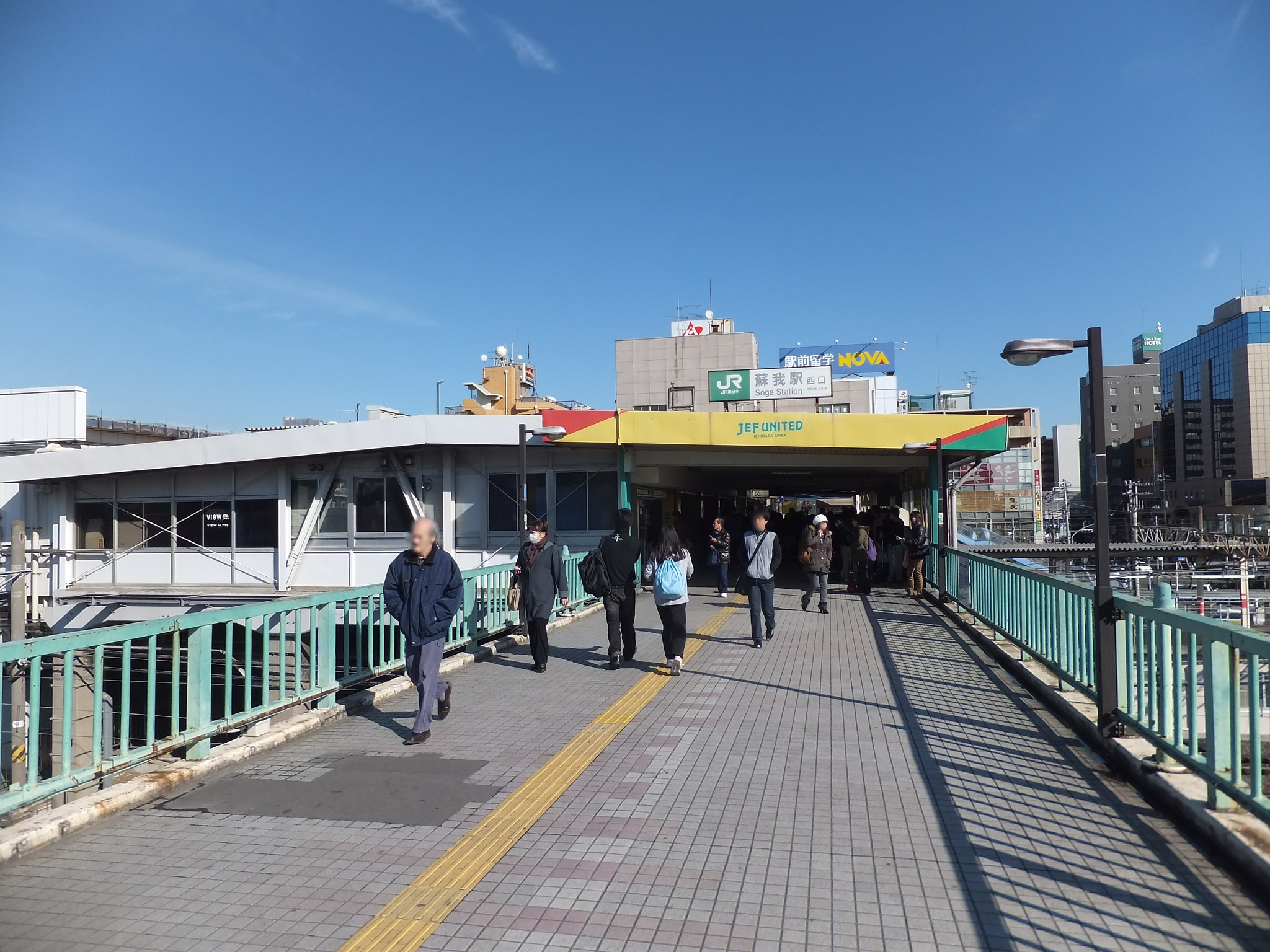
- West exit, December 2011

General information
- Location: 2 Imai, Chuo-ku, Chiba-shi, Chiba-ken, 260-0834; Japan
- Coordinates: 35°34′53.33″N 140°07′52.10″E
- Operator: JR East; JR Freight; Keiyō Rinkai Railway Company
- Lines: ■ Uchibō Line; ■ Sotobō Line; Keiyō Line
- Distance: 43.0 km from Tokyo
- Platforms: 3 island platforms
- Connections: Bus stop

Other information
- Status: Staffed (Midori no Madoguchi)
- Website: Official website

History
- Opened: 20 January 1896; 130 years ago

Passengers
- FY2019: 34,189
Services
Preceding station	JR East	Following station
Chibaminato JE17 towards Tokyo	Keiyō Line Rapid Local	through to Sotobō Line and Uchibō Line
Tokyo Terminus	Sazanami	Goi towards Kimitsu
through to Keiyō Line	Uchibō Line Keiyō Rapid	Hamano towards Kazusa-Minato
Hon-Chiba towards Chiba	Uchibō Line Sobū Rapid	Hamano towards Kimitsu
through to Keiyō Line	Uchibō Line Local	Hamano towards Awa-Kamogawa
Hon-Chiba towards Chiba	Uchibō Line Local	Hamano towards Awa-Kamogawa
Kaihimmakuhari JE14 (limited service) towards Tokyo	Wakashio	Toke (limited service) towards Awa-Kamogawa
through to Keiyō Line	Sotobō Line Keiyō Rapid	Kamatori towards Katsuura
Hon-Chiba towards Chiba	Sotobō Line Sobū Rapid	Kamatori towards Kazusa-Ichinomiya
through to Keiyō Line	Sotobō Line Local	Kamatori towards Awa-Kamogawa
Hon-Chiba towards Chiba	Sotobō Line Local	Kamatori towards Awa-Kamogawa
Location
- Location within Tokyo Keiyo area Location within Chiba Prefecture Location within Japan

Soga Station (蘇我駅, Soga-eki) is a junction railway station located in Chūō-ku, Chiba, Chiba Prefecture, Japan, operated by the East Japan Railway Company (JR East). It is also a freight depot for the Japan Freight Railway Company (JR Freight) and the all-freight Keiyō Rinkai Railway Company.

== Lines ==
Soga Station is the northern terminal station for the Uchibō Line and is 3.8 km (2.4 mi) from the northern terminus of the Sotobō Line at Chiba Station. It is 43.0 km (26.7 mi) from the terminus of the Keiyō Line at Tokyo Station. The station is also the starting point of the Keiyō Rinkai Railway's Rinkai Main Line.

== Station layout ==
Soga is an elevated station with an elevated station building, three island platforms and a total of six tracks. Freight tracks are located to the side of the first platform, and the Keiyō Rinkai Railway office is located to the side of these. The station is staffed with personnel from both companies. It includes a Midori no Madoguchi staffed ticket office and automatic ticket gates.

=== Platforms ===
Track layout

1, 2	■ Uchibō Line	for Chiba, Tokyo
1, 2	■ Sotobō Line	for Chiba, Tokyo
1, 2	■ Keiyō Line	for Kaihimmakuhari, Minami-Funabashi, Maihama, Shin-Kiba, and Tokyo
3, 4	■ Keiyō Line	for Kaihimmakuhari, Minami-Funabashi, Maihama, Shin-Kiba, and Tokyo
5, 6	■ Uchibō Line	for Goi, Kisarazu
5, 6	■ Sotobō Line	for Ōami, Togane, Narutō, Mobara

- Trains at tracks 3 and 4 terminate at this station.
- During the morning rush hour and certain other times, two different trains bound for Tokyo, namely the train connecting to the Sōbu Line Rapid via the Sotobō Line, and the Keiyō Line trains (via Kaihimmakuhari and Shin-Kiba) leave from the same platform (platform 2).

== History ==
Soga Station opened on 20 January 1896. The station became part of JR East on the division and privatization of JNR on 1 April 1987. The Keiyō Line opened on 1 December 1988.

== Passenger statistics ==
In fiscal 2019, the station was used by an average of 34,189 passengers daily (boarding passengers only).

== Surroundings ==
- Chibadera Station
- Soga Sports Park
- Fukuda Denshi Arena (Soga Stadium) --JEF United Ichihara / Chiba Home Stadium.
- JFE Gymnasium
- Shukutoku University (Chiba Campus, Chiba 2nd Campus)
- Ueno Law Business College

== Bus routes ==
- Chiba Chuo Bus
- Kominato Tetsudō Bus
- Askabus
- Keikyu Bus (Haneda Airport Limousine Bus (same direction as the Kominato Tetsudo Bus))

== See also ==
- List of railway stations in Japan
