= Minami Bōsō Quasi-National Park =

Quasi-National Park in Japan

- 南房総国定公園
- IUCN category V (protected landscape/seascape)
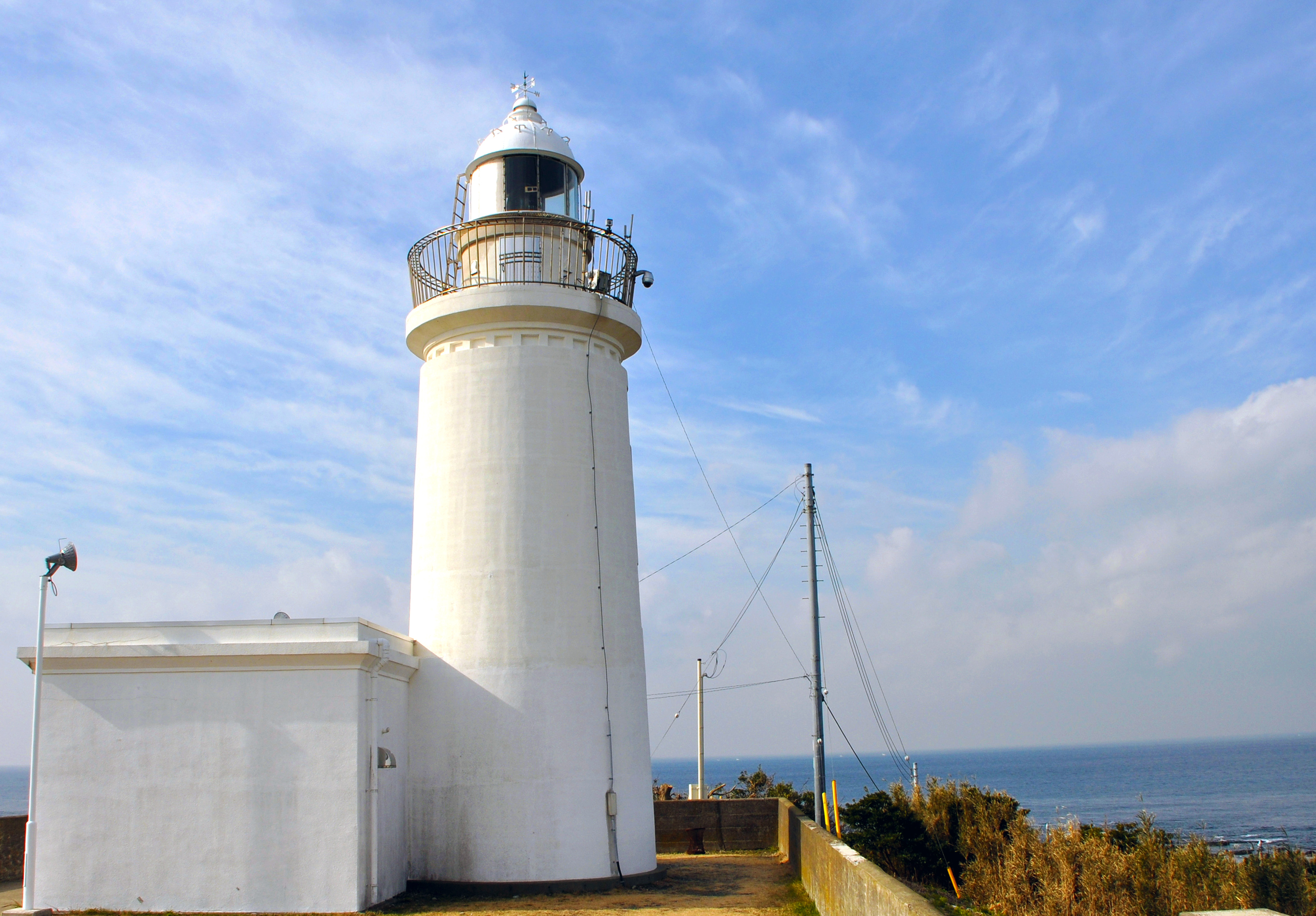
- Sunosaki Lighthouse

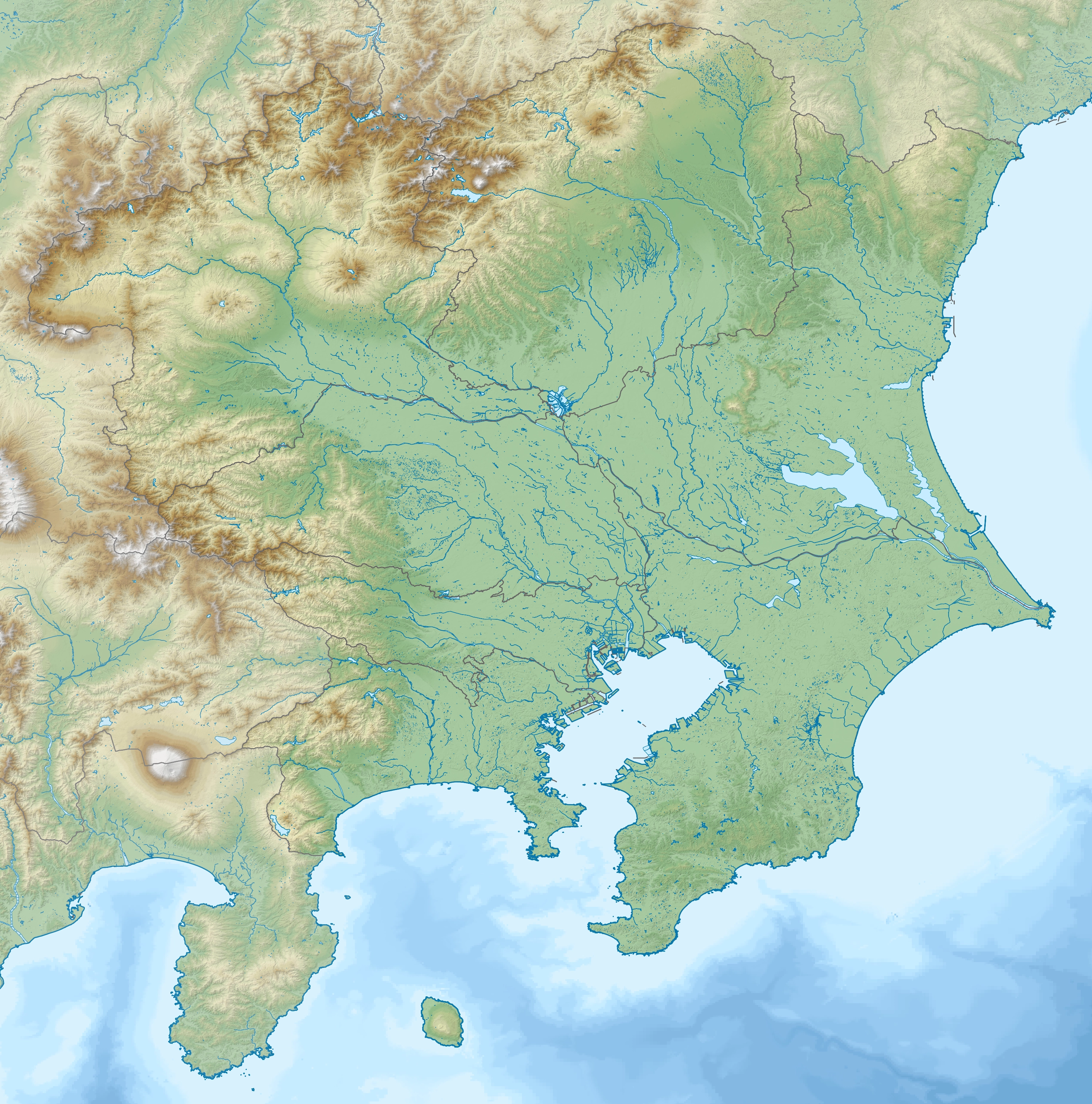
- Location within Kanto Area Location within Japan
- Location: Honshū, Japan
- Coordinates: 35°7′45″N 140°7′46″E
- Area: 56.90 km^{2} (21.97 sq mi)
- Established: August 1, 1958
- Governing body: Chiba Prefecture

Minami Bōsō Quasi-National Park (南房総国定公園, Minami-Bōsō Kokutei Kōen) is a quasi-national park in the Kantō region of Honshū in Japan. It is rated a protected landscape (category V) according to the IUCN. The park includes numerous widely separated portions of the coastal areas of southern Bōsō Peninsula, ranging from Cape Futtsu on Tokyo Bay to the west, to Cape Inubō facing the Pacific Ocean in the east. A portion of the park, located offshore the city of Katsuura has been designated as an underwater marine park since June 7, 1974. With the location of the park near to the Tokyo Metropolis, and its mild climate, the area attracts many visitors for water sports, camping, and flower viewing.

Like all Quasi-National Parks in Japan, the park is managed by local prefectural governments.

== Jurisdictions ==
Minami Bōsō Quasi-National Park includes parts of nine jurisdictions in Chiba Prefecture.

- Futtsu
- Kimitsu
- Minamibōsō
- Tateyama
- Kamogawa
- Katsuura
- Isumi
- Kyonan
- Onjuku

== Notable places ==
=== Bays and harbors ===
- Bay of Tateyama

=== Capes ===
- Cape Myōgane
- Cape Taitō
- Cape Hachiman, Isumi
- Cape Hachiman, Katsuura

=== Mountains ===
- Mount Tomi
- Mount Nokogiri

=== Lighthouses ===
- Nojimazaki Lighthouse

=== Castle remains ===
- Katsuura Castle, Katsuura
- Sanuki Castle, Futtsu

== See also ==
- List of national parks of Japan
