= Cape Hachiman =

Cape Hachiman may refer to:

- Cape Hachiman (Isumi, Chiba)
- Cape Hachiman (Katsuura, Chiba)
