= Chōjamachi Station =

Railway station in Isumi, Chiba Prefecture, Japan

Chōjamachi Station 長者町駅
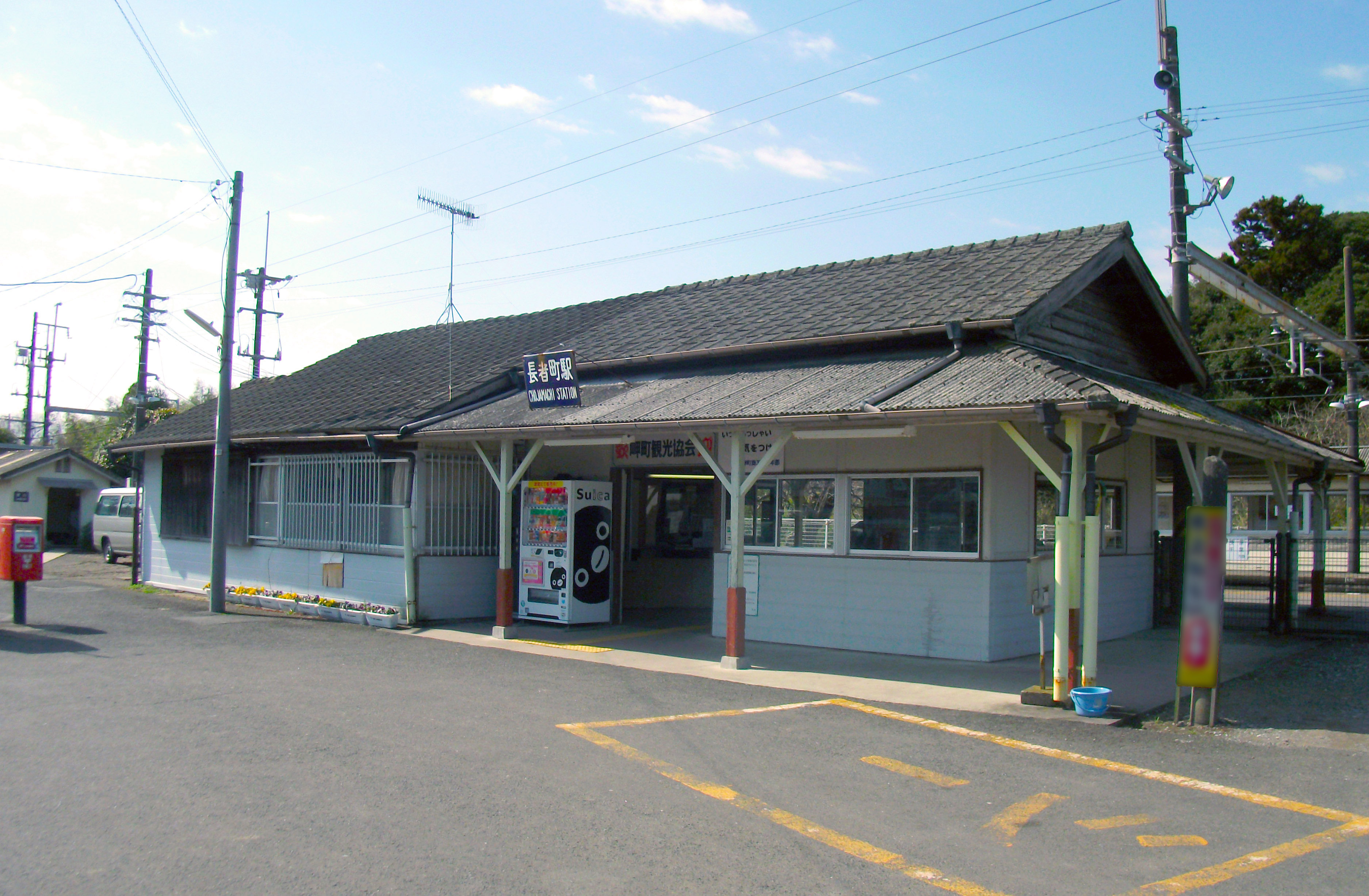
- Chōjamachi Station in March 2012

General information
- Location: Misakichō Chōja 81, Isumi-shi, Chiba-ken 299-4616; Japan
- Coordinates: 35.2964°N 140.3843°E
- Operator: JR East
- Line: ■ Sotobō Line
- Distance: 52.1 km from Chiba
- Platforms: 1 island platform

Other information
- Status: Staffed
- Website: Official website

History
- Opened: 13 December 1899; 126 years ago

Passengers
- FY2019: 334

Services
Preceding station	JR East	Following station
Taitō towards Soga	Sotobō Line Keiyō Rapid	Mikado towards Katsuura
Taitō towards Soga or Chiba	Sotobō Line Local	Mikado towards Awa-Kamogawa
Location
- Location within Chiba Prefecture Location within Japan

Chōjamachi Station (長者町駅, Chōjamachi-eki) is a passenger railway station located in the city of Isumi, Chiba Prefecture Japan, operated by the East Japan Railway Company (JR East).

== Lines ==
Chōjamachi Station is served by the Sotobō Line, and is located 52.1 km (32.4 mi) from the official starting point of the line at Chiba Station.

== Station layout ==
The station consists of a single island platform connected to a white-washed station building by a footbridge. The station is staffed.

=== Platform ===
1	■ Sotobō Line	Katsuura, Awa-Kamogawa
2	■ Sotobō Line	For Kazusa-Ichinomiya, Mobara, Soga, Chiba

== History ==
Chōjamachi Station was opened on 13 December 1899 as a station on the Bōsō Railway. On 1 September 1907, the Bōsō Railway was nationalized and became part of the Japanese Government Railways, which was transformed into the Japan National Railways (JNR) after World War II. Freight operations were discontinued on 1 October 1962. The station was absorbed into the JR East network upon the privatization of the Japan National Railways on 1 April 1987.

== Passenger statistics ==
In fiscal 2019, the station was used by an average of 334 passengers daily (boarding passengers only).

== Surrounding area ==
- National Route 128
- former Misakipachi town hall

== See also ==
- List of railway stations in Japan
