= Mikado Station =

Railway station in Isumi, Chiba Prefecture, Japan

Mikado Station 三門駅
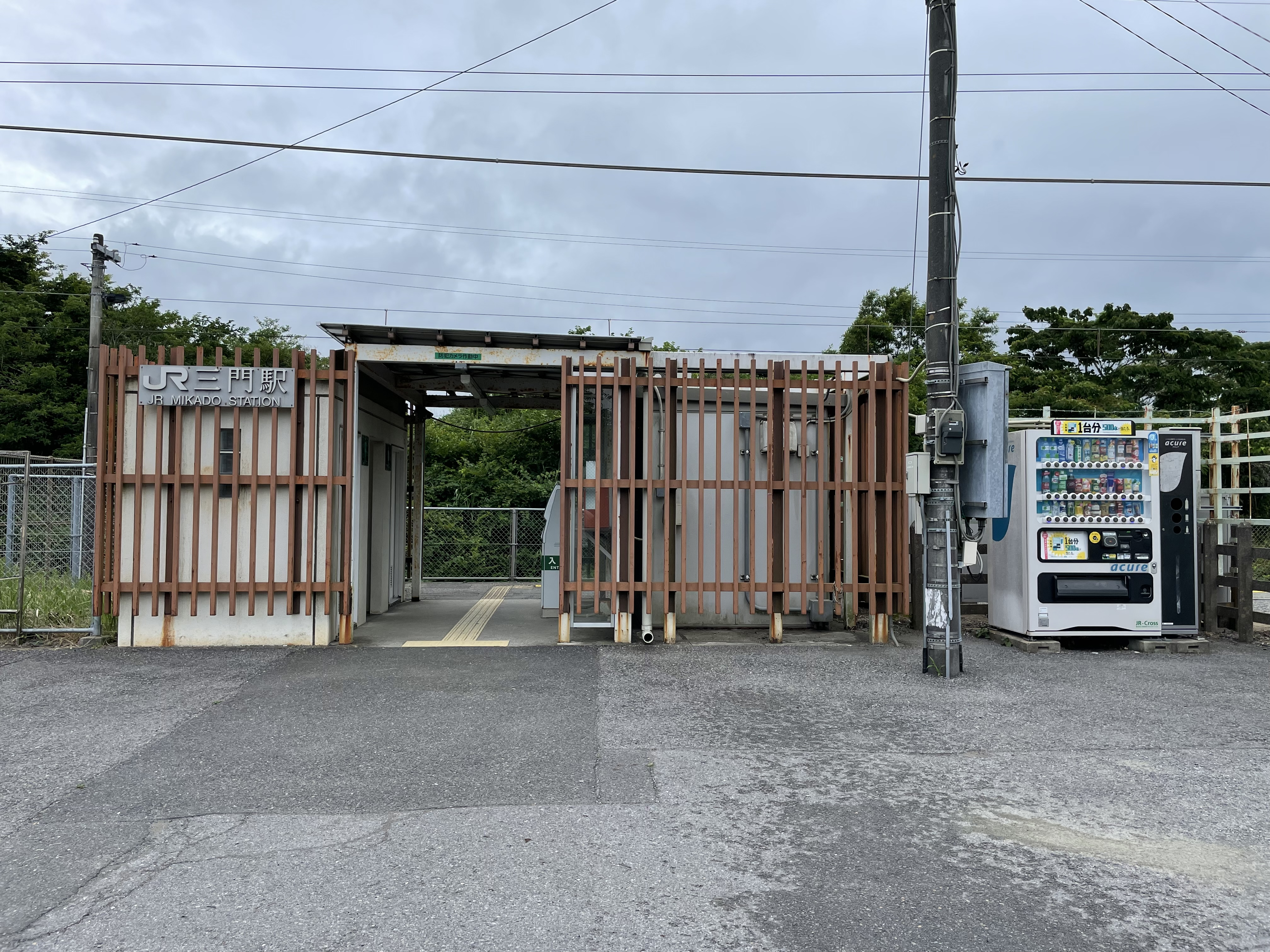
- Mikado Station in July, 2022

General information
- Location: Hiari 2445, Isumi-shi, Chiba-ken 299-4613; Japan
- Coordinates: 35.2825°N 140.3917°E
- Operator: JR East
- Line: ■ Sotobō Line
- Distance: 53.7 km from Chiba
- Platforms: 1 side platform

Other information
- Status: Unstaffed
- Website: Official website

History
- Opened: 14 January 1905; 121 years ago

Passengers
- FY2006: 123

Services
Preceding station	JR East	Following station
Chōjamachi towards Soga	Sotobō Line Keiyō Rapid	Ōhara towards Katsuura
Chōjamachi towards Soga or Chiba	Sotobō Line Local	Ōhara towards Awa-Kamogawa
Location
- Location within Chiba Prefecture Location within Japan

Mikado Station (三門駅, Mikado-eki) is a passenger railway station located in the city of Isumi, Chiba Prefecture Japan, operated by the East Japan Railway Company (JR East).

== Lines ==
Mikado Station is served by the Sotobō Line, and is located 53.7 km (33.4 mi) from the official starting point of the line at Chiba Station.

== Station layout ==
Mikado Station has a single side platform connected to a station building constructed out of two modified freight containers. The platform is short, and can handle trains with a maximum length of eight cars.

=== Platform ===
1	■ Sotobō Line	Katsuura, Awa-Kamogawa, Kazusa-Ichinomiya, Mobara, Soga, Chiba

== History ==
Mikado Station was opened on 16 August 1903 as a freight station on the Bōsō Railway. Scheduled passenger operations began from 14 January 1905. On 1 September 1907, the Bōsō Railway was nationalized and became part of the Japanese Government Railways, which was transformed into the Japan National Railways (JNR) after World War II. Freight operations were discontinued on October 1, 1962. The station has been unattended since 1 July 1972. In 1985, the station building was torn down, and replaced by a modified freight container. The station was absorbed into the JR East network upon the privatization of the Japan National Railways on 1 April 1987. The station building burned down on November 30, 2005 and was replaced by the current structure.

== Passenger statistics ==
In fiscal 2006, the station was used by an average of 123 passengers daily.

== Surrounding area ==
- National Route 128
- Kiyomizu-dera (Isumi, Chiba)

== See also ==
- List of railway stations in Japan
