= Kasuganishiki Takahiro =

Sumo wrestler

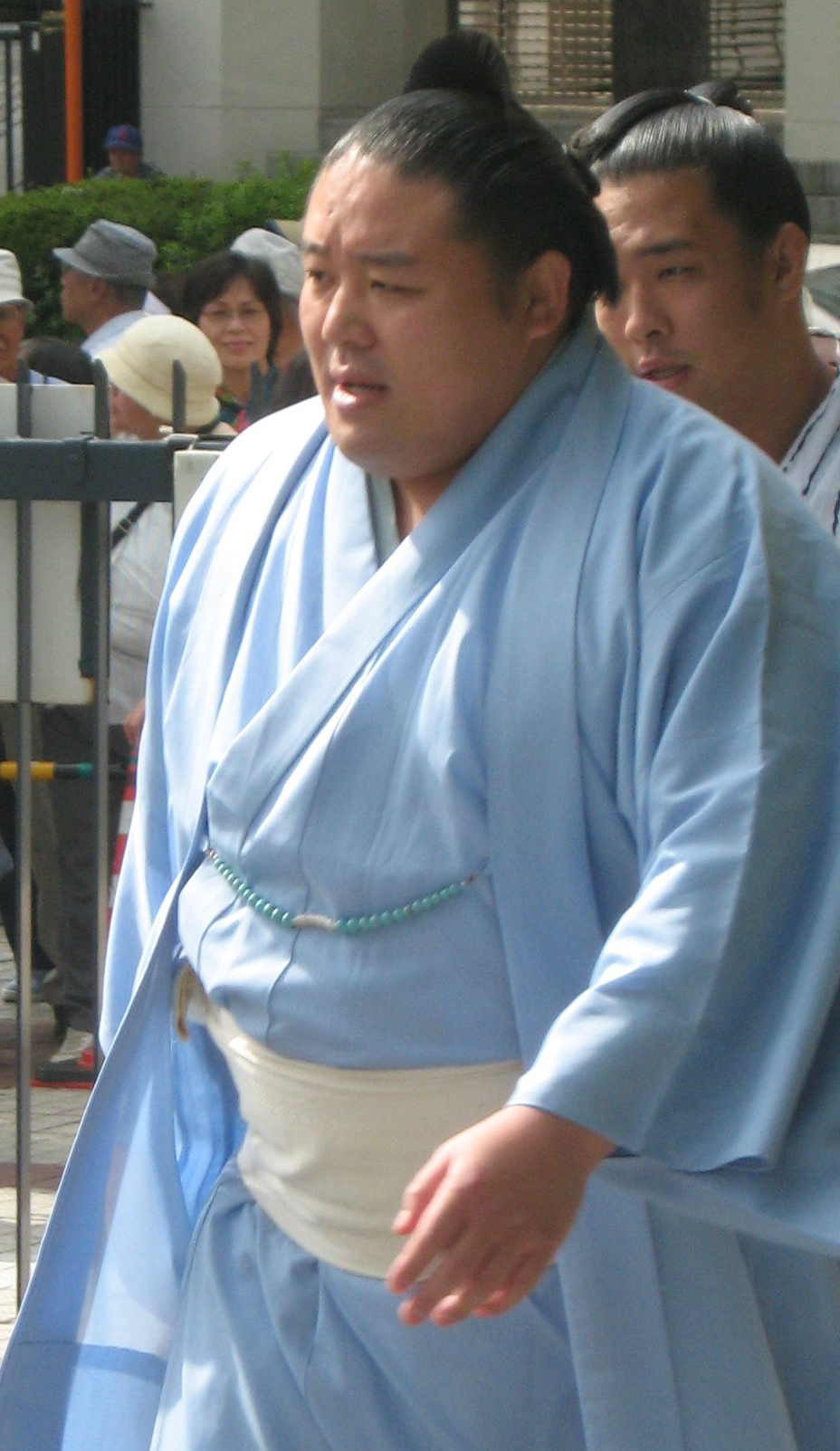

Personal information
- Native name: 春日錦 孝嘉
- Born: Takahiro Suzuki; August 22, 1975 (age 51) Chiba, Japan
- Height: 1.88 m (6 ft 2 in)
- Weight: 152 kg (335 lb)

Sport
- Sport: Sumo
- Retired: January, 2011
- Heya: Kasugano
- Record: 611-581-89
- Debut: March, 1991
- Highest rank: Maegashira 5 (September, 2003)
- Elder name: Takenawa
- Updated on June 2020

Kasuganishiki Takahiro (born August 22, 1975 as Takahiro Suzuki) is a former sumo wrestler from Misaki, Isumi District, Chiba Prefecture, Japan. He made his debut in 1991, reaching the top makuuchi division in 2002. His highest rank was maegashira 5. He retired in 2011 and became an elder of the Japan Sumo Association under the name Takenawa, but admitted involvement in match-fixing after text messages were found on his mobile phone that showed he had arranged the result of bouts with fellow wrestlers the previous year. His testimony was part of the Sumo Association's investigation into the affair which led to 22 other wrestlers being found guilty, most of whom were ordered to retire. Given a two-year suspension, he instead left sumo completely.

== Career ==
He made his professional debut in March 1991 (the same tournament as Chiyotenzan) and was immediately given the shikona or fighting name of Kasuganishiki, based on the name of his stable, Kasugano. He used the same shikona throughout his career. After eight years in the unsalaried lower divisions, he reached the jūryō division for the first time in July 1999, but could win only two matches. However, he re-established himself as a sekitori in 2001.

He had a stroke of good fortune in the May 2002 tournament, when no fewer than three of his scheduled opponents had to withdraw due to injuries, an extremely rare occurrence. Thus only six of his nine wins in that tournament came through actual fights, the rest being fusensho, or default wins. He followed up with a strong 11–4 record in the next tournament, which earned him promotion to the top makuuchi division for the first time in September 2002.

However, he suffered a number of injuries after that, having to sit out the May 2004 tournament completely due to cartilage damage in his right knee, which cost him his place in the top division. On his return in March 2005, he had to withdraw after only four days. He spent 20 tournaments in makuuchi in total, but did not have a kachi-koshi or winning score there after January 2007. He returned to the top division for November 2008, after a year's absence, following a 9–6 score at jūryō 3 and a high number of vacancies. He had to withdraw due to an injury during the Kyushu tournament and fell to the second division once again.

He is known for sociable and good-natured personality, and enjoys fishing as a hobby.

He was suspended along with over a dozen other wrestlers from the July 2010 tournament after admitting involvement in illegal betting on baseball. As a result, he fell to the makushita division in September, where he remained until announcing his retirement in January 2011.

== Retirement from sumo and match-fixing claims ==
Kasuganishiki remained in sumo as a coach at his stable under the name Takenawa Oyakata. However, in February 2011 just a few days after his retirement announcement, news broke that police had discovered text messages on his mobile phone dating from the previous year, that indicated he had arranged the result of several matches with fellow juryo wrestlers in exchange for money. Of the 46 messages under suspicion, 22 were sent by the then-Kasuganishiki and 14 were received by him, and many describe what moves the wrestlers should make and how to make the bouts look convincing. He reportedly admitted his involvement after being questioned by the Sumo Association. Takenawa still received the severance pay awarded to retired sekitori (believed to be in the region of 15 million yen) as the match-fixing scandal did not surface until after he had retired from the ring. In March the Mainichi Daily News reported that Takenawa claimed about 40 other wrestlers were involved in the match-fixing scam, and that he first became exposed to yaocho in January 2006 when a sanyaku wrestler asked him to throw a bout. He refused on that occasion, but later became involved when injuries sent him down to juryo. His stablemaster Kasugano denied the story, while Takenawa himself refused to comment.

In April, 23 wrestlers and coaches were found guilty of match-fixing. Although most were ordered to retire, Takenawa because of his admission of wrongdoing was given the lighter penalty of a two-year suspension. However, he indicated his intention to resign.

== Fighting style ==
Kasuganishiki's favourite techniques are listed on his profile at the Sumo Association as pushing and thrusting, or tsuki/oshi, but his most common winning move in his career was actually yori-kiri, or force out, using the opponent's mawashi or belt. He also regularly used oshi-dashi, the push out, and hataki-komi, the slap down.

== Career record ==
Kasuganishiki Takahiro
Year	January Hatsu basho, Tokyo	March Haru basho, Osaka	May Natsu basho, Tokyo	July Nagoya basho, Nagoya	September Aki basho, Tokyo	November Kyūshū basho, Fukuoka
1991	x	(Maezumo)	West Jonokuchi #45; 6–1	West Jonidan #100; 3–4	West Jonidan #126; 3–4	East Jonokuchi #1; 5–2
1992	West Jonidan #97; 5–2	West Jonidan #50; 2–5	East Jonidan #85; 4–3	East Jonidan #56; Sat out due to injury 0–0–7	East Jonidan #127; 6–1	East Jonidan #49; 3–3–1
1993	West Jonidan #73; 6–1	East Jonidan #6; 4–3	West Sandanme #84; 3–4	East Sandanme #98; 4–3	East Sandanme #75; 4–3	West Sandanme #56; 3–4
1994	West Sandanme #68; 3–4	East Sandanme #85; 4–2–1	East Sandanme #62; 4–3	East Sandanme #45; 4–3	West Sandanme #31; Sat out due to injury 0–0–7	West Sandanme #91; 5–2
1995	West Sandanme #55; 3–4	West Sandanme #71; 4–3	West Sandanme #52; 5–2	West Sandanme #23; 5–2	West Makushita #59; 4–3	East Makushita #49; 2–6
1996	East Sandanme #13; 7–0–P	East Makushita #11; 2–5	East Makushita #25; 4–3	West Makushita #17; 2–5	East Makushita #32; 2–5	West Makushita #50; 2–5
1997	West Sandanme #9; 5–2	East Makushita #51; 5–2	East Makushita #35; Sat out due to injury 0–0–7	East Sandanme #15; 5–2	West Makushita #51; 4–3	East Makushita #42; 6–1
1998	West Makushita #20; 3–4	West Makushita #30; 5–2	East Makushita #21; 6–1	East Makushita #8; 4–3	East Makushita #5; 3–4	East Makushita #10; Sat out due to injury 0–0–7
1999	East Makushita #10; 4–3	West Makushita #6; 5–2	West Makushita #3; 6–1	West Jūryō #12; 2–13	West Makushita #11; 1–2–4	West Makushita #29; 3–4
2000	West Makushita #35; 6–1	East Makushita #16; 6–1	West Makushita #4; 3–4	West Makushita #7; 5–2	East Makushita #2; 3–4	East Makushita #7; 6–1
2001	East Makushita #2; 5–2	West Jūryō #10; 5–10	West Makushita #1; 3–4	East Makushita #4; 5–2	West Jūryō #13; 9–6	West Jūryō #8; 7–8
2002	East Jūryō #9; 10–5	West Jūryō #3; 6–9	East Jūryō #6; 9–6	East Jūryō #4; 11–4	West Maegashira #10; 5–10	West Jūryō #1; 10–5
2003	West Maegashira #11; 7–8	East Maegashira #13; 6–9	East Jūryō #1; 9–6	East Maegashira #12; 9–6	West Maegashira #5; 5–10	East Maegashira #9; 8–7
2004	West Maegashira #5; 4–10–1	East Maegashira #10; 5–10	East Maegashira #14; Sat out due to injury 0–0–15	East Jūryō #7; 8–7	West Jūryō #4; 5–10	East Jūryō #9; 10–5
2005	East Jūryō #4; 10–5	East Maegashira #14; 1–3–11	East Jūryō #7; 7–8	East Jūryō #8; 9–6	West Jūryō #2; 9–6	East Maegashira #15; 9–6
2006	West Maegashira #5; 4–11	West Maegashira #13; 5–10	East Jūryō #2; 7–8	West Jūryō #2; 9–6	East Maegashira #15; 6–9	East Jūryō #3; 9–6
2007	East Maegashira #13; 9–6	East Maegashira #10; 4–11	West Maegashira #16; 4–11	East Jūryō #3; 8–7	East Maegashira #16; 7–8	West Maegashira #16; 7–8
2008	East Jūryō #1; 4–11	West Jūryō #8; 8–7	East Jūryō #4; 6–9	West Jūryō #6; 9–6	West Jūryō #3; 9–6	West Maegashira #12; 2–3–10
2009	East Jūryō #6; 7–8	West Jūryō #7; 7–8	East Jūryō #9; 8–7	West Jūryō #7; 9–6	West Jūryō #1; 2–10–3	East Jūryō #13; 9–6
2010	East Jūryō #10; 6–9	West Jūryō #13; 8–7	East Jūryō #9; 7–8	West Jūryō #10; Suspended; 0–0–15	West Makushita #10; 1–6	West Makushita #26; 3–4
2011	East Makushita #30; Retired; 2–5	x	x	x	x	x
Record given as wins–losses–absences Top division champion Top division runner-up Retired Lower divisions Non-participation Sanshō key: F=Fighting spirit; O=Outstanding performance; T=Technique Also shown: ★=Kinboshi; P=Playoff(s); Divisions: Makuuchi — Jūryō — Makushita — Sandanme — Jonidan — Jonokuchi Makuuchi ranks: Yokozuna — Ōzeki — Sekiwake — Komusubi — Maegashira

== See also ==
- Glossary of sumo terms
- List of past sumo wrestlers
