= Isumi District =

Isumi District 夷隅郡
- District of Chiba Prefecture
- 夷隅郡• Isumi-gun
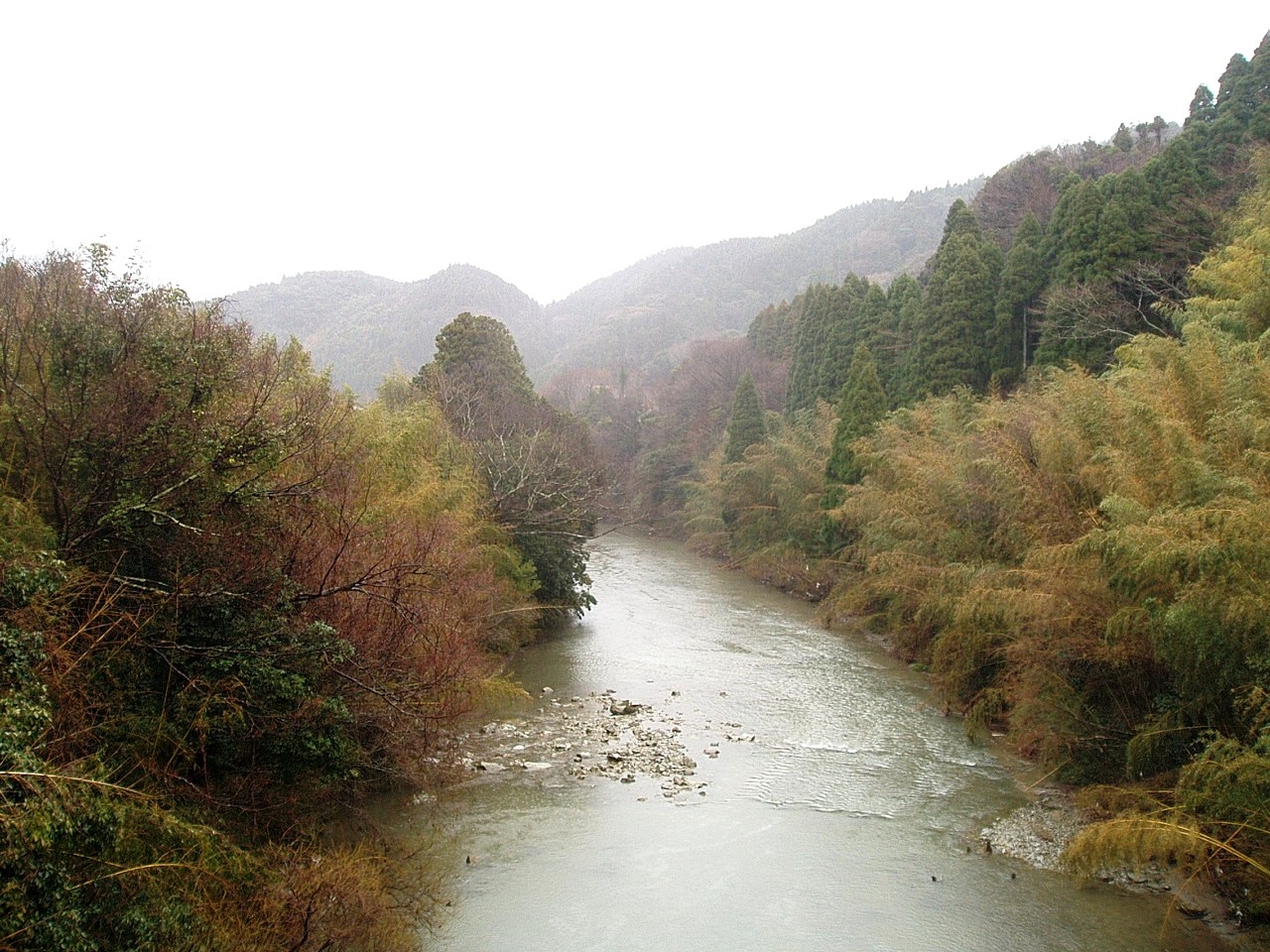
- Isumi River in Ōtaki

- Location of Isumi District in Chiba

- Coordinates: 35°13′52.2″N 140°14′1″E
- Country: Japan
- Region: Kantō
- Prefecture: Chiba

Area
  - Total: 154.76 km^{2} (59.75 sq mi)

Population (2010)
  - Total: 18,593
  - Density: 120/km^{2} (310/sq mi)
- Time zone: UTC+9 (Japan Standard Time)
- Telephone: 0470-86-6600
- Address: 88-1 Yamasa, Isumi-shi, Chiba-ken; 298-0124
- Website: Isumi County-City Joint Administration Block Office Association(in Japanese)

Isumi District (夷隅郡, Isumi-gun) is a district located in Chiba, Japan. As of 2010, the district has an estimated population of 18,593 and a density of 120 persons per km^{2}. The total area was 154.76 square kilometres (59.75 mi^{2}). The district formerly included all of the city of Katsuura, most of the city of Isumi and a portion of the town of Mutsuzawa. It has been reduced in size through mergers and consolidation to two towns. The district is located in the outer zone of Metropolitan Tokyo, roughly 70 kilometres (43 mi) from the center of the capital.

== Towns and villages ==
- Onjuku
- Ōtaki

== History ==
=== Early history ===
Isumi District was one of the ancient districts of Kazusa Province. The district was named after the Isumi River, which runs from the mountainous areas of Katsuura to the south of Kujūkuri Beach on the Pacific Ocean. The district is mentioned in Nara-period chronicles under various names, usually as Ishimi (伊志美). The Nihon Shoki records the area as Ijimi no Kuni (伊甚国), and the Kojiki as Ijimu (伊自牟). In the ancient period the district bordered Mōda and Unakami districts to the west, and Habu and Nagara districts to the north. In the Heian period (794–1185) the district was divided into two shōen estates; one to the north, and one to the south. Minamoto no Yoritomo (1147–1199) drew soldiers from both shōen estates with the assistance of the local warlord Kazusa Hirotsune (?–1184). Yoritomo went on to found the Kamakura Shogunate. Manki Castle and Ōtaki Castle were built in this period. Kuniyoshi, once a village and now part of Isumi City, became a noted market town in this period, and a rokusai-ichi, or market held six days of the month, is held to this day. By the end of the Sengoku period (1467–1573) the district had been variously controlled by the Toki, Hōjō, and Satomi clans. The Satomi ceded the area to Oda Nobunaga (1534–1582) in 1590.

=== Edo period ===
The name of Isumi District was standardized to its present kanji and pronunciation by the Edo period. Tokugawa Ieyasu (1543–1616), as part of the wider unification of Japan, entered the Kantō region in 1590 and awarded the Isumi District to a trusted general Honda Tadakatsu (1548–1610). Under the Tokugawa shogunate, the minor feudal domain of Ōtaki Domain, controlled by Honda Tadakatsu from Ōtaki Castle, controlled 18 villages within the district, with another 57 villages under the control of other domains (including one village belonging to Nitta Domain in Tosa Province). The remaining 108 villages were tenryō under direct control of the central government and administered by various hatamoto, or samurai in the direct service of the Tokugawa shogunate. The Edo period was marked by the extensive development of rice paddy land in the district.

=== Modern period ===
In the post Meiji Restoration cadastral reform, the area came under the control of Chiba Prefecture and on April 1, 1889, was divided into two towns (Ōtaki and Asahi) and 21 villages. Katsuura was elevated to town status on March 12, 1890, Kuniyoshi (future Chōjamachi) on September 22, 1893, Ōhara on December 2, 1899, Onjuku on April 1, 1914, and Okitsu on January 1, 1921. The town of Isumi was created on April 29, 1954, through the merger of Chōjamachi with neighboring villages, and the town of Taitō was created in December of the same year. Katsuura was elevated to city status on October 1, 1958. Taitō and Chōjamachi merged to form the town of Misaki on August 1, 1961, leaving the district with five towns.

On December 5, 2005, the towns of Isumi, Misaki and Ōhara merged to form the city of Isumi, leave the district with only two remaining towns.
