= Taitō Station =

Railway station in Isumi, Chiba Prefecture, Japan

Taitō Station 太東駅
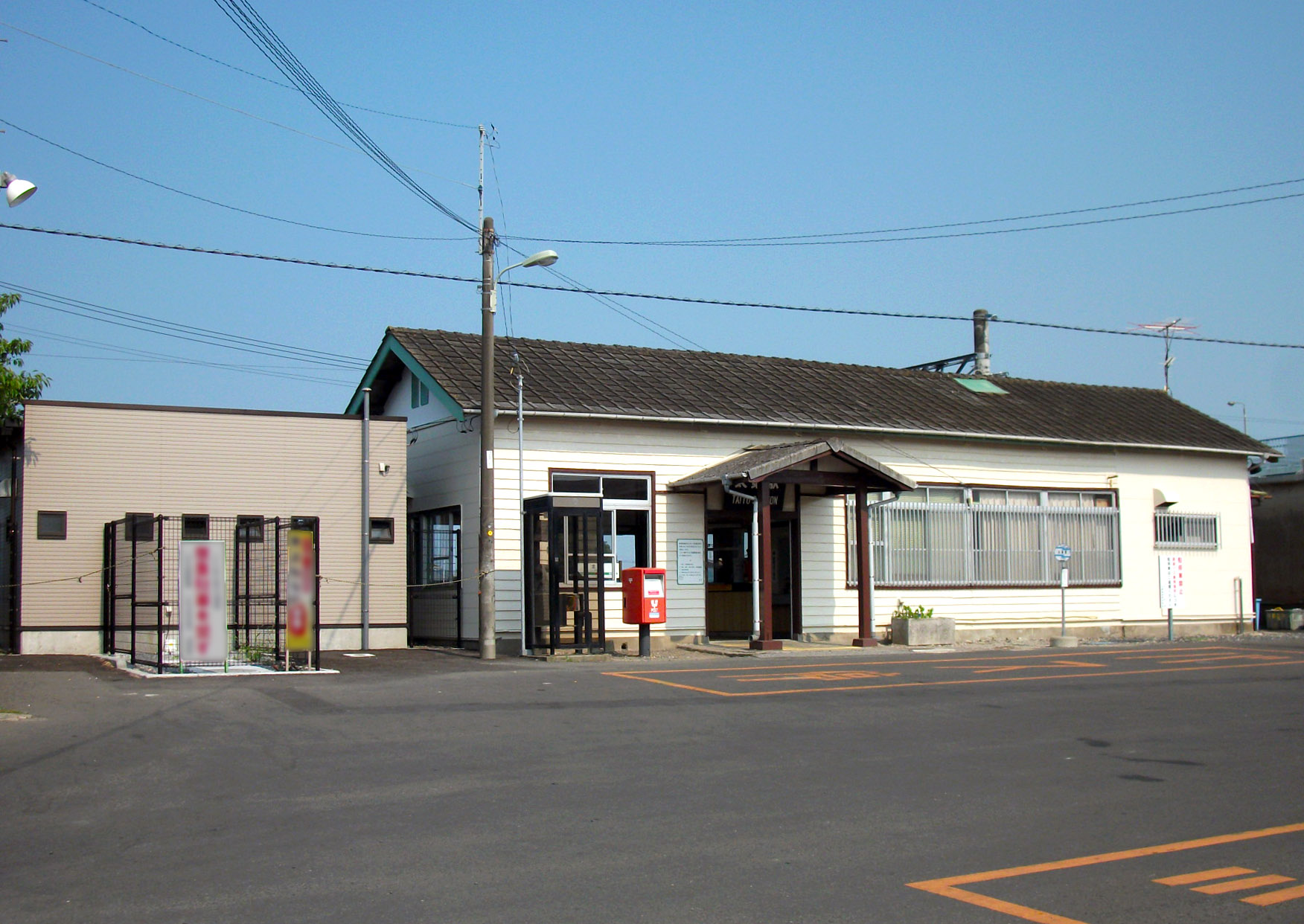
- Taitō Station in July 2010

General information
- Location: Shiigi, Isumi-shi, Chiba-ken 299-4501; Japan
- Coordinates: 35.3198°N 140.3812°E
- Operator: JR East
- Line: ■ Sotobō Line
- Distance: 49.3 km from Chiba
- Platforms: 1 island platform

Other information
- Status: Staffed
- Website: Official website

History
- Opened: 13 December 1899; 126 years ago

Passengers
- FY2019: 436

Services
Preceding station	JR East	Following station
Torami towards Soga	Sotobō Line Keiyō Rapid	Chōjamachi towards Katsuura
Torami towards Soga or Chiba	Sotobō Line Local	Chōjamachi towards Awa-Kamogawa
Location
- Location within Chiba Prefecture Location within Japan

Taitō Station (太東駅, Taitō-eki) is a passenger railway station located in the city of Isumi, Chiba Prefecture Japan, operated by the East Japan Railway Company (JR East).

== Lines ==
Taitō Station is served by the Sotobō Line, and lies 49.3 km (30.6 mi) from the starting point of the Sotobō Line at Chiba Station.

== Station layout ==
The station consists of a single island platform and a single side platform serving three tracks, connected to a white-washed station building by a footbridge. The station is staffed.

=== Platform ===
1	■ Sotobō Line	for Katsuura and Awa-Kamogawa
2	■ Sotobō Line	bi-directional traffic
3	■ Sotobō Line	for Kazusa-Ichinomiya, Mobara, Soga, and Chiba

== History ==
Taitō Station was opened on 13 December 1899 as a station on the Bōsō Railway. On 1 September 1907, the Bōsō Railway was nationalized and became part of the Japanese Government Railways, which was transformed into the Japanese National Railways (JNR) after World War II. The station was absorbed into the JR East network upon the privatization of the Japan National Railways on 1 April 1987.

== Passenger statistics ==
In fiscal 2019, the station was used by an average of 436 passengers daily (boarding passengers only).

== See also ==
- List of railway stations in Japan
