= Cape Taitō =

Cape in Isumi, Chiba Prefecture, Japan

Coordinates: 35°18′28.81″N 140°24′47.05″E

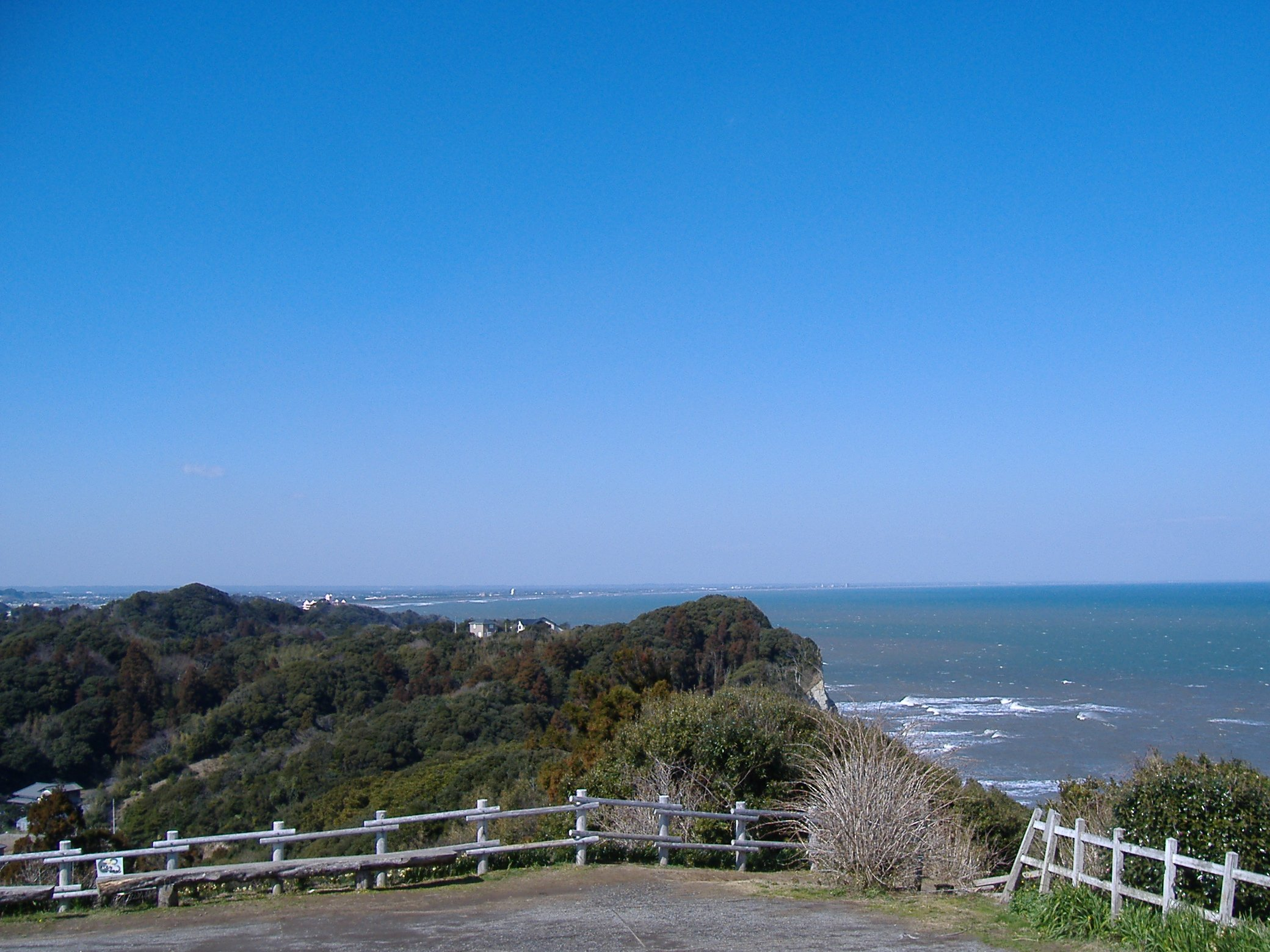
Kujūkuri Beach viewed from Cape Taitō

Cape Taitō (太東崎, Taitōsaki) is a cape on the Pacific Ocean, in the city of Isumi, Chiba Prefecture, Japan. The cape is located at the very southern point of Kujūkuri Beach on the island of Honshu.

== Geography ==
Cape Taitō is written as 太東岬 in Japanese. Cape Gyōbumi, Asahi, Chiba, is visible to the north; the mouth of the Isumi River and the streets of the city of Isumi are visible to the south. Much of the cape is open as a public park area, and it is part of Minami Bōsō Quasi-National Park.

== History ==
Cape Taitō was significantly larger in the Edo period, but has shrunk due to marine erosion and the effects of the 1703 Genroku earthquake. Significant military facilities were built on the cape during World War II when it served as a military fortification. The Japanese Imperial Navy placed radar detection equipment on the cape to detect a possible American invasion by sea. The concrete base of the radar station, 7.8 meters (26 ft) in diameter, remains near the lighthouse. The installation was abandoned after the war, and mostly disappeared into the Pacific Ocean due to marine erosion.

== Cape Taitō Lighthouse ==
The cape is home to the Cape Taitō Lighthouse, which is 60 meters (200 ft) high, and sits 100 meters (330 ft) inland. The original Cape Taitō Lighthouse was built in 1950 and lit in 1952. The current structure was built in 1972 to replace the original lighthouse, which was abandoned due to fear of marine erosion. The lighthouse is visible from approximately 41 kilometers (25 mi) out to sea.

== Transportation ==
The cape is located 4 kilometers (2.5 mi) from the JR East Taitō Station, and is approximately 45 minutes by foot from the station.
