= Torami Station =

Railway station in Ichinomiya, Chiba Prefecture, Japan

Torami Station 東浪見駅
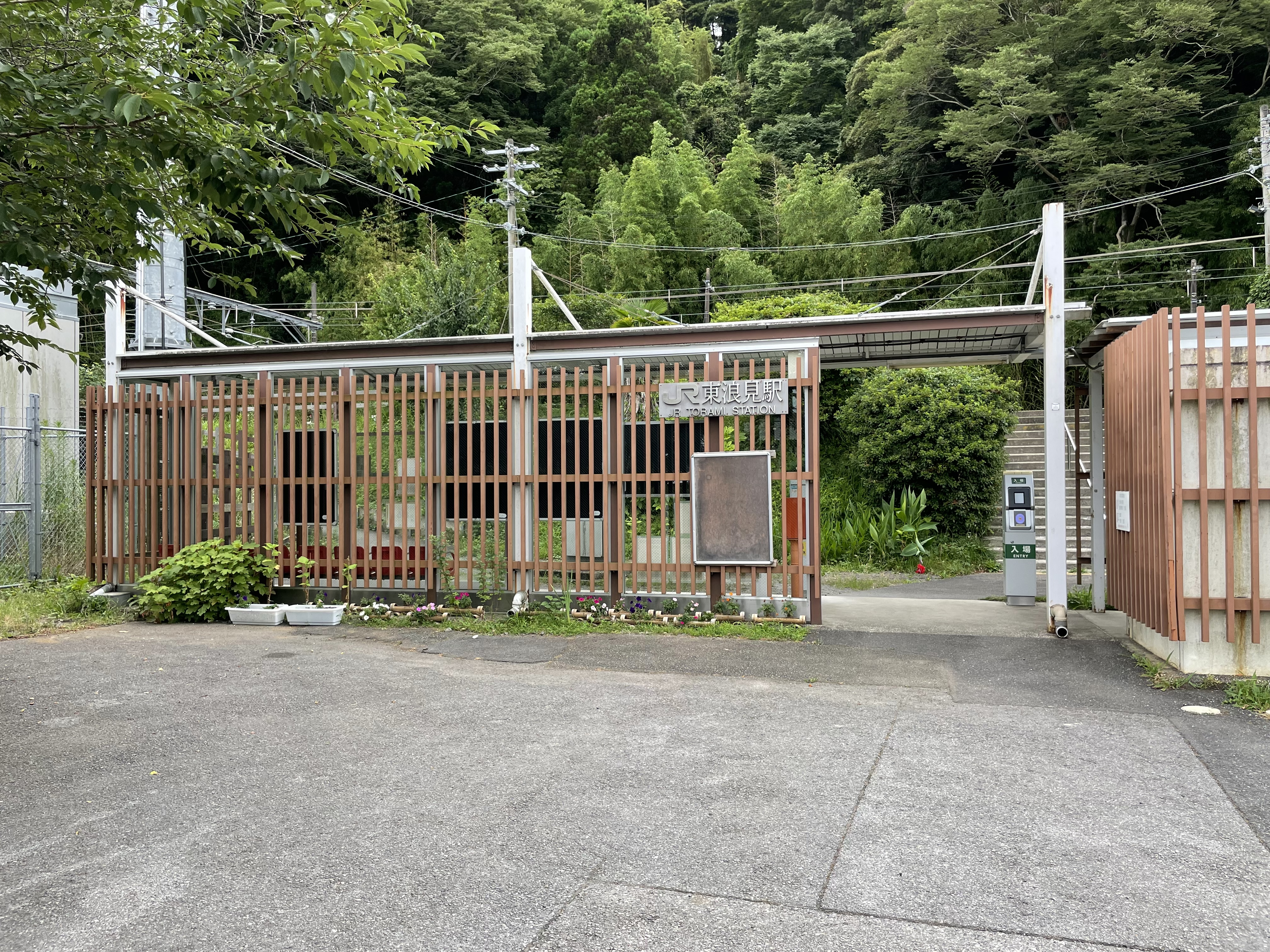
- Station building in July, 2022

General information
- Location: 2769 Torami, Ichinomiya-machi, Chōsei-gun, Chiba-ken 299-4303; Japan
- Coordinates: 35.3471°N 140.3760°E
- Operator: JR East
- Line: ■ Sotobō Line
- Distance: 46.2 km from Chiba
- Platforms: 2 side platforms

Other information
- Status: Unstaffed
- Website: Official website

History
- Opened: 15 December 1925; 100 years ago

Passengers
- FY2006: 81 daily

Services
Preceding station	JR East	Following station
Kazusa-Ichinomiya towards Soga	Sotobō Line Keiyō Rapid	Taitō towards Katsuura
Kazusa-Ichinomiya towards Soga or Chiba	Sotobō Line Local	Taitō towards Awa-Kamogawa
Location
- Location within Chiba Prefecture Location within Japan

Torami Station (東浪見駅, Torami-eki) is a passenger railway station located in the town of Ichinomiya, Chiba Prefecture Japan, operated by the East Japan Railway Company (JR East).

== Lines ==
Torami Station is served by the Sotobō Line, and lies 46.2 km (28.7 mi) from the starting point of the line at Chiba Station. Only local services stop at this station.

== Station layout ==
The station consists of two opposed side platforms serving two tracks, connected to the station building by a footbridge. The station is unattended.

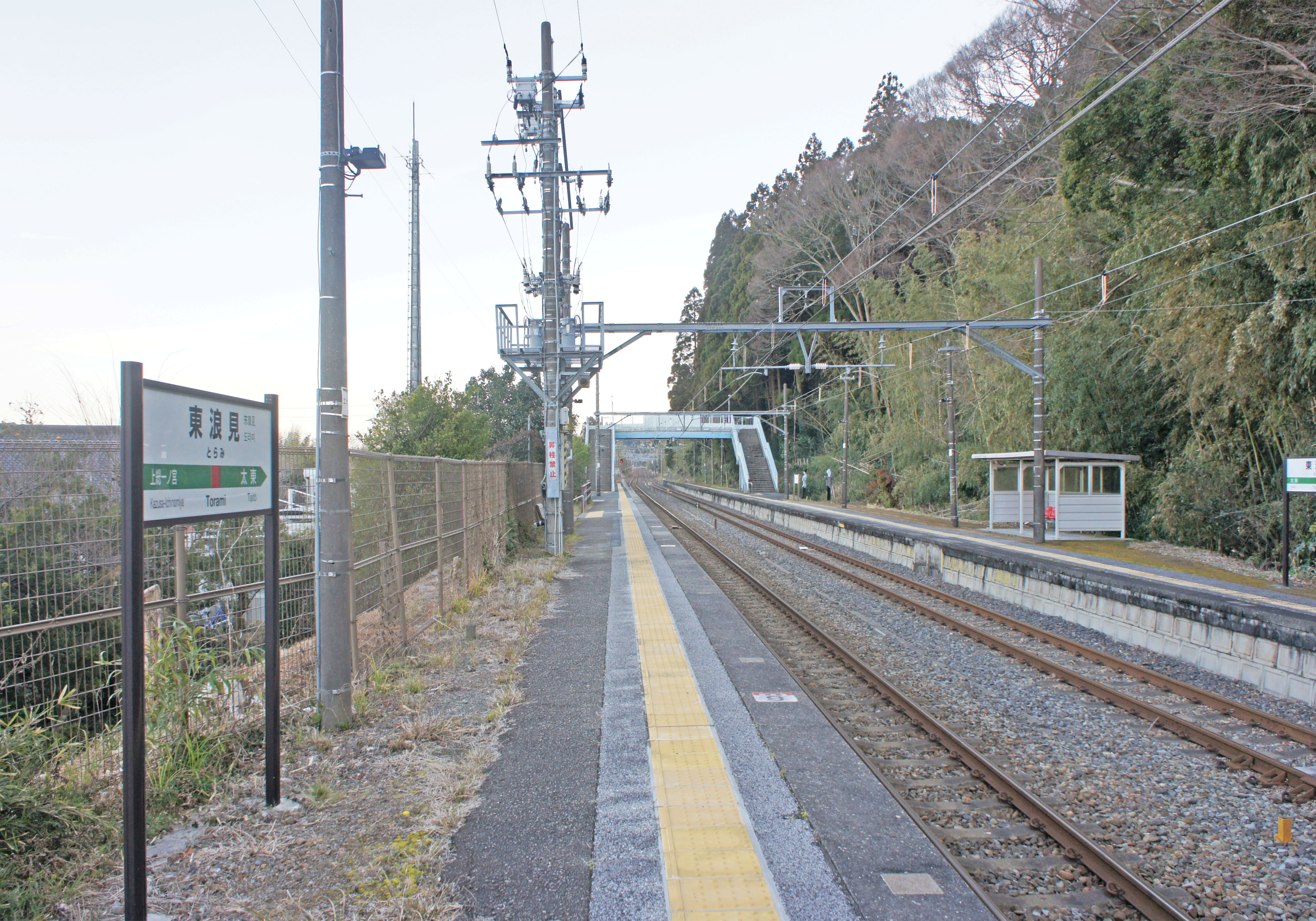
Platform in February, 2022

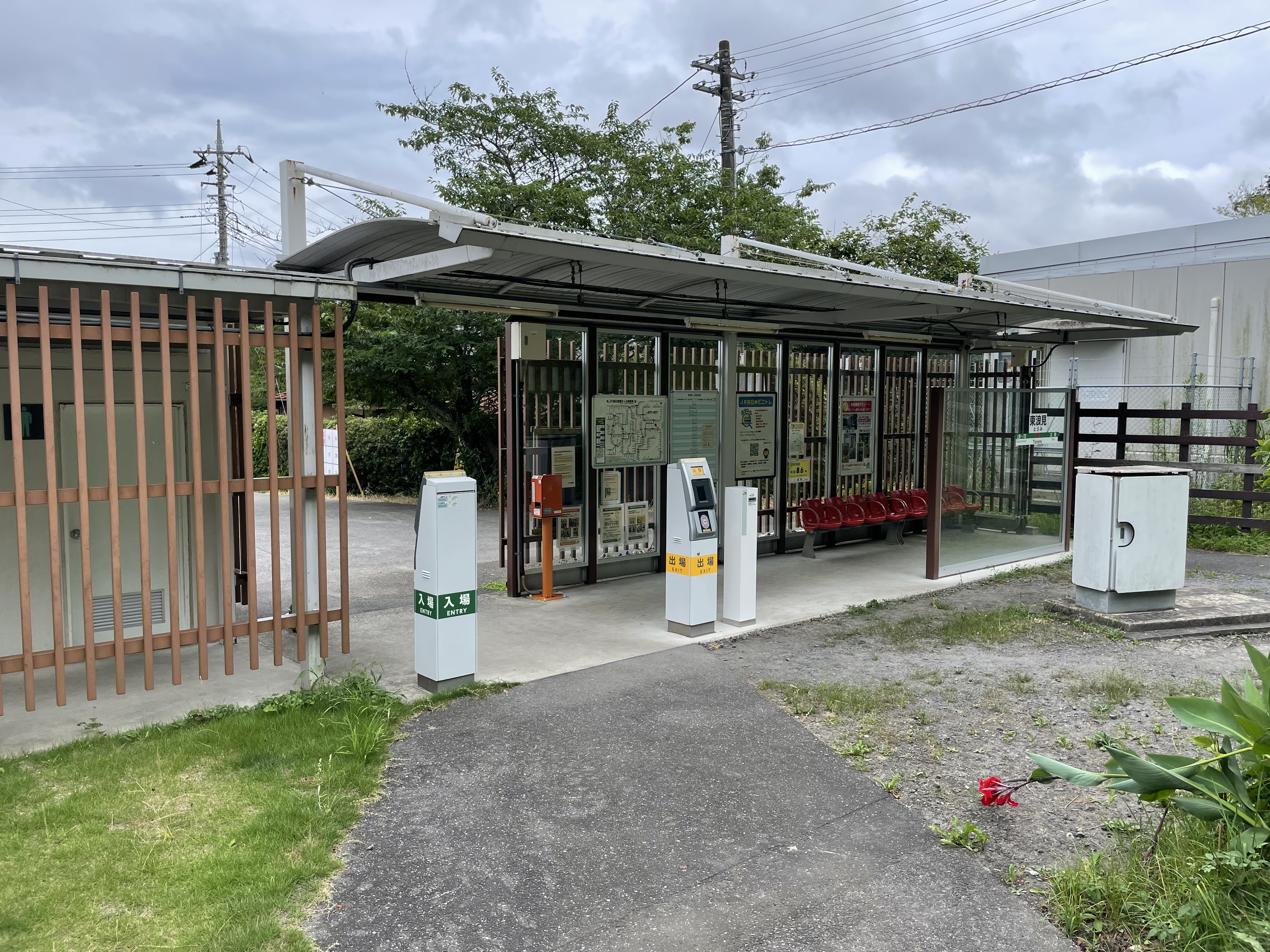
Ticket Gate and Waiting room in July, 2022

=== Platforms ===
1	■ Sotobō Line	for Katsuura and Awa-Kamogawa
2	■ Sotobō Line	for Kazusa-Ichinomiya, Mobara, Soga, and Chiba

== History ==
Torami Station opened on 15 December 1925. Freight operations were discontinued on 1 October 1962. The station has been unstaffed since 1 July 1972. The station was absorbed into the JR East network upon the privatization of the Japanese National Railways (JNR) on 1 April 1987. The station building was reconstructed between 2006 and 2007.

== Passenger statistics ==
In fiscal 2006, the station was used by an average of 81 passengers daily.

== Surrounding area ==
- National Route 128
- Ichinomiya Town Torami Elementary School

== See also ==
- List of railway stations in Japan
