= Tochifuji Katsutake =

Japanese sumo wrestler (1946–2003)

Personal information
- Native name: 栃富士 勝健
- Born: Haruo Kogure; June 8, 1946 Kumagaya, Saitama, Japan
- Died: April 28, 2003 (aged 56)
- Height: 1.86 m (6 ft 1 in)
- Weight: 141 kg (311 lb; 22.2 st)

Sport
- Sport: Sumo
- Retired: September, 1974
- Heya: Kasugano
- Record: 461-434-18
- Debut: May, 1961
- Highest rank: Maegashira 3 (May, 1971)
- Elder name: Yamawake
- Championships: 2 (Jūryō); 1 (Makushita)
- Gold Stars: 2 (Kashiwado, Taihō)
- Updated on June 2020

Tochifuji Katsutake (born Haruo Kogure; June 8, 1946 – April 28, 2003) was a sumo wrestler from Kumagaya, Saitama, Japan. He made his professional debut in May 1961, and reached the top division in September 1968. Upon retirement from active competition he became an elder in the Japan Sumo Association under the name Yamawake. He coached at Kasugano-beya until 1990, when he joined Tamanoi-oyakata, who branched out to form Tamanoi-beya. He died on April 28, 2003, due to a myocardial infarction

== Career record ==
Tochifuji Katsutake
Year	January Hatsu basho, Tokyo	March Haru basho, Osaka	May Natsu basho, Tokyo	July Nagoya basho, Nagoya	September Aki basho, Tokyo	November Kyūshū basho, Fukuoka
1961	x	x	(Maezumo)	West Jonokuchi #24; 5–2	East Jonidan #56; 4–3	West Jonidan #9; 2–5
1962	West Jonidan #34; 5–2	East Jonidan #2; 3–4	East Jonidan #10; 6–1	West Sandanme #50; 4–3	West Sandanme #38; 4–3	East Sandanme #27; 4–3
1963	East Sandanme #19; 4–3	West Sandanme #8; 4–3	West Makushita #93; 5–2	East Makushita #64; 2–5	West Makushita #83; 4–3	West Makushita #73; 6–1
1964	East Makushita #42; 2–5	West Makushita #55; 4–3	East Makushita #50; 5–2	East Makushita #35; 5–2	East Makushita #26; 4–3	West Makushita #21; 6–1
1965	East Makushita #7; 5–2	West Makushita #2; 3–5	West Makushita #5; 3–4	West Makushita #9; 6–1	West Makushita #1; Sat out due to injury 0–0–7	West Makushita #36; 5–2
1966	East Makushita #27; 4–3	West Makushita #22; 5–2	East Makushita #14; 6–1	West Makushita #3; 4–3	West Makushita #1; 2–5	East Makushita #10; 4–3
1967	East Makushita #7; 6–1	East Makushita #1; 6–1	East Makushita #3; 7–0; Champion	East Jūryō #9; 8–7	West Jūryō #6; 8–7	East Jūryō #5; 7–8
1968	East Jūryō #6; 6–9	East Jūryō #10; 11–4; Champion	East Jūryō #3; 8–7	West Jūryō #2; 9–6	West Maegashira #11; 6–9	East Jūryō #2; 9–6
1969	West Maegashira #12; 11–4	East Maegashira #5; 6–9 ★	West Maegashira #6; 4–11	East Maegashira #12; 5–10	West Jūryō #3; 6–9	West Jūryō #6; 7–8
1970	East Jūryō #8; 8–7	West Jūryō #5; 5–10	West Jūryō #10; 9–6	East Jūryō #5; 9–6	West Jūryō #2; 9–6	East Jūryō #2; 10–5
1971	East Maegashira #11; 8–7	West Maegashira #7; 8–7	East Maegashira #3; 2–13 ★	East Maegashira #11; 5–10	West Jūryō #2; 6–9	East Jūryō #5; 5–10
1972	West Jūryō #11; 8–7	East Jūryō #6; 6–9	West Jūryō #9; 10–5	East Jūryō #3; 7–8	East Jūryō #4; 10–5–PPPP; Champion	East Maegashira #13; 5–10
1973	East Jūryō #3; 7–8	West Jūryō #5; 8–7	East Jūryō #3; 8–7	East Jūryō #2; 6–9	East Jūryō #5; 10–5	West Maegashira #12; 4–11
1974	West Jūryō #5; 8–7	West Jūryō #2; 2–5–8	West Jūryō #11; 9–6	West Jūryō #3; 3–12	East Jūryō #13; Retired; 1–11–3	x
Record given as wins–losses–absences Top division champion Top division runner-up Retired Lower divisions Non-participation Sanshō key: F=Fighting spirit; O=Outstanding performance; T=Technique Also shown: ★=Kinboshi; P=Playoff(s); Divisions: Makuuchi — Jūryō — Makushita — Sandanme — Jonidan — Jonokuchi Makuuchi ranks: Yokozuna — Ōzeki — Sekiwake — Komusubi — Maegashira

== See also ==
- Glossary of sumo terms
- List of past sumo wrestlers
- List of sumo tournament second division champions
