= Yatsumi Station =

Railway station in Chōsei, Chiba Prefecture, Japan

Yatsumi Station 八積駅
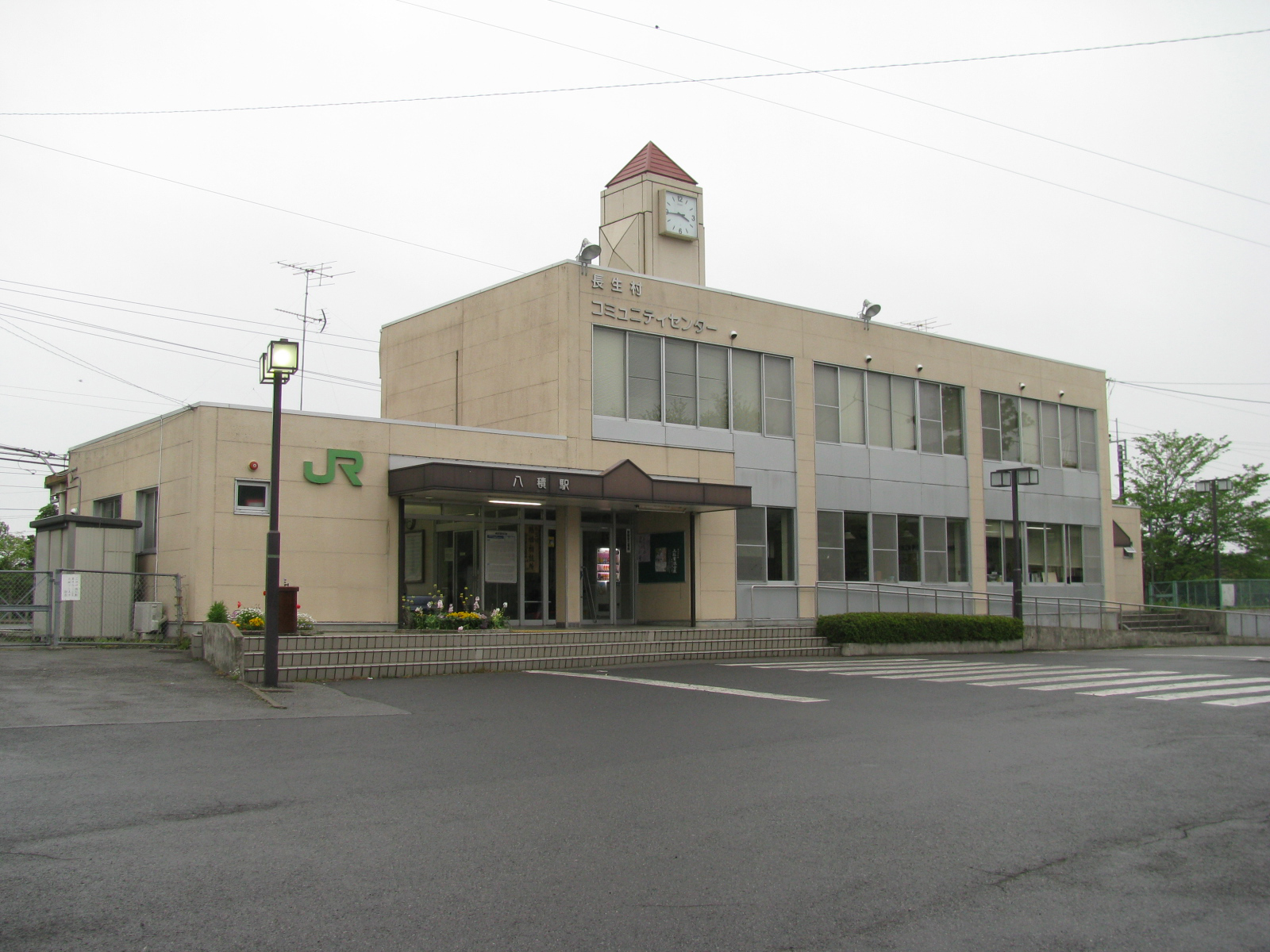
- Yatsumi Station

General information
- Location: Iwanuma 822, Chōsei-mura, Chōsei-gun, Chiba-ken 299-4336; Japan
- Coordinates: 35.4041°N 140.3455°E
- Operator: JR East
- Line: ■ Sotobō Line
- Distance: 38.9 km from Chiba
- Platforms: 2 side platforms

Other information
- Status: Staffed
- Website: Official website

History
- Opened: 25 March 1898; 128 years ago
- Former names: Iwanuma (until 1915)

Passengers
- FY2019: 726 daily

Services
Preceding station	JR East	Following station
Mobara towards Soga	Sotobō Line Keiyō Rapid (limited service)	Kazusa-Ichinomiya towards Katsuura
Mobara towards Soga or Chiba	Sotobō Line Local	Kazusa-Ichinomiya towards Awa-Kamogawa
Location
- Location within Chiba Prefecture Location within Japan

Yatsumi Station (八積駅, Yatsumi-eki) is a passenger railway station located in the village of Chōsei, Chiba Prefecture Japan, operated by the East Japan Railway Company (JR East).

== Lines ==
Yatsumi Station is served by the Sotobō Line, and lies 38.9 km (24.2 mi) from the starting point of the line at Chiba Station.

== Station layout ==
The station consists of two opposed side platforms connected to a two-story station building by a footbridge. The station is staffed.

=== Platform ===
1	■ Sotobō Line	For Kazusa-Ichinomiya, Katsuura, Awa-Kamogawa
2	■ Sotobō Line	For Mobara, Soga, Chiba

== History ==
Yatsumi Station was opened on 25 March 1898 as Iwanuma Station (岩沼駅, Iwanuma-eki) on the Boso Railway. It was absorbed into the Japanese Government Railways on 1 September 1907, and was renamed to its present name on 11 March 1915. It joined the JR East network upon the privatization of the Japan National Railways (JNR) on 1 April 1987.

== Passenger statistics ==
In fiscal 2019, the station was used by an average of 726 passengers daily (boarding passengers only).

== Surrounding area ==
- National Route 128
- Chōsei Village Hall

== See also ==
- List of railway stations in Japan
