= Kujūkuri Beach =

Beach in Chiba Prefecture, Japan

- 九十九里浜; Kujūkuri-hama
- IUCN category V (protected landscape/seascape)
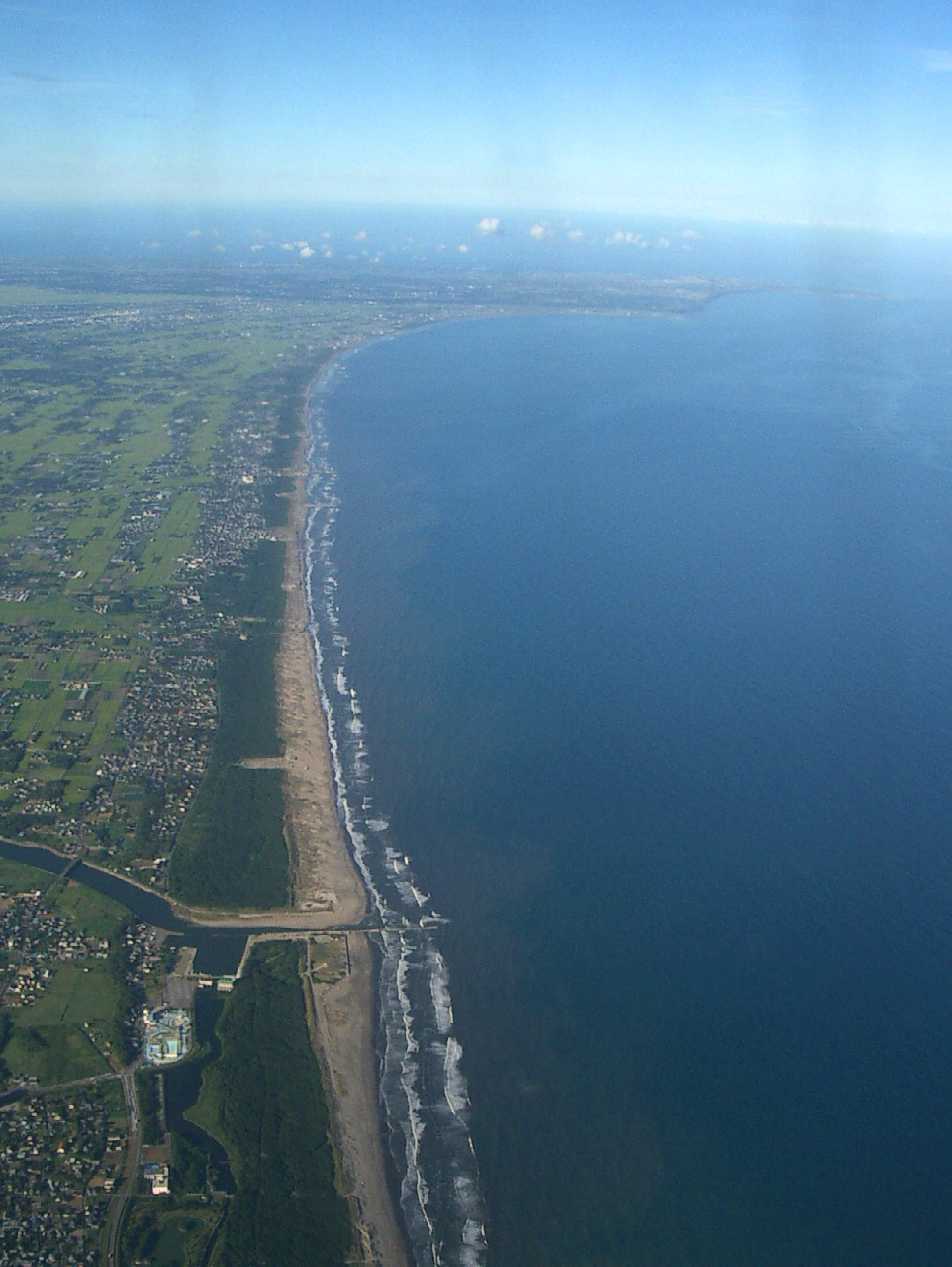
- Aerial view, from south to north, of Kujūkuri Beach

- Location within Japan
- Location: Chiba Prefecture, Japan
- Coordinates: 35°31′44″N 140°27′07″E

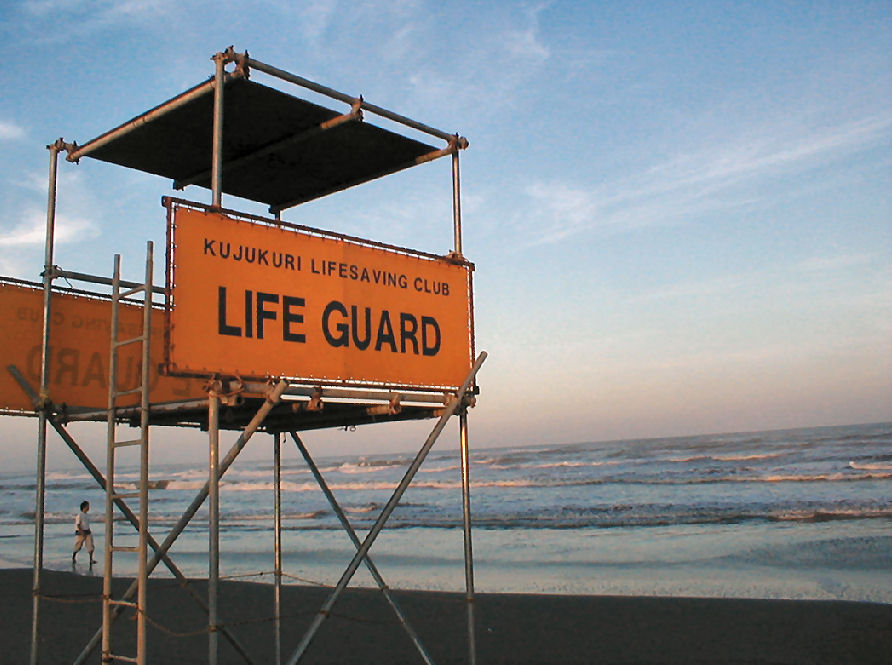
Kujūkuri Beach on a late summer afternoon

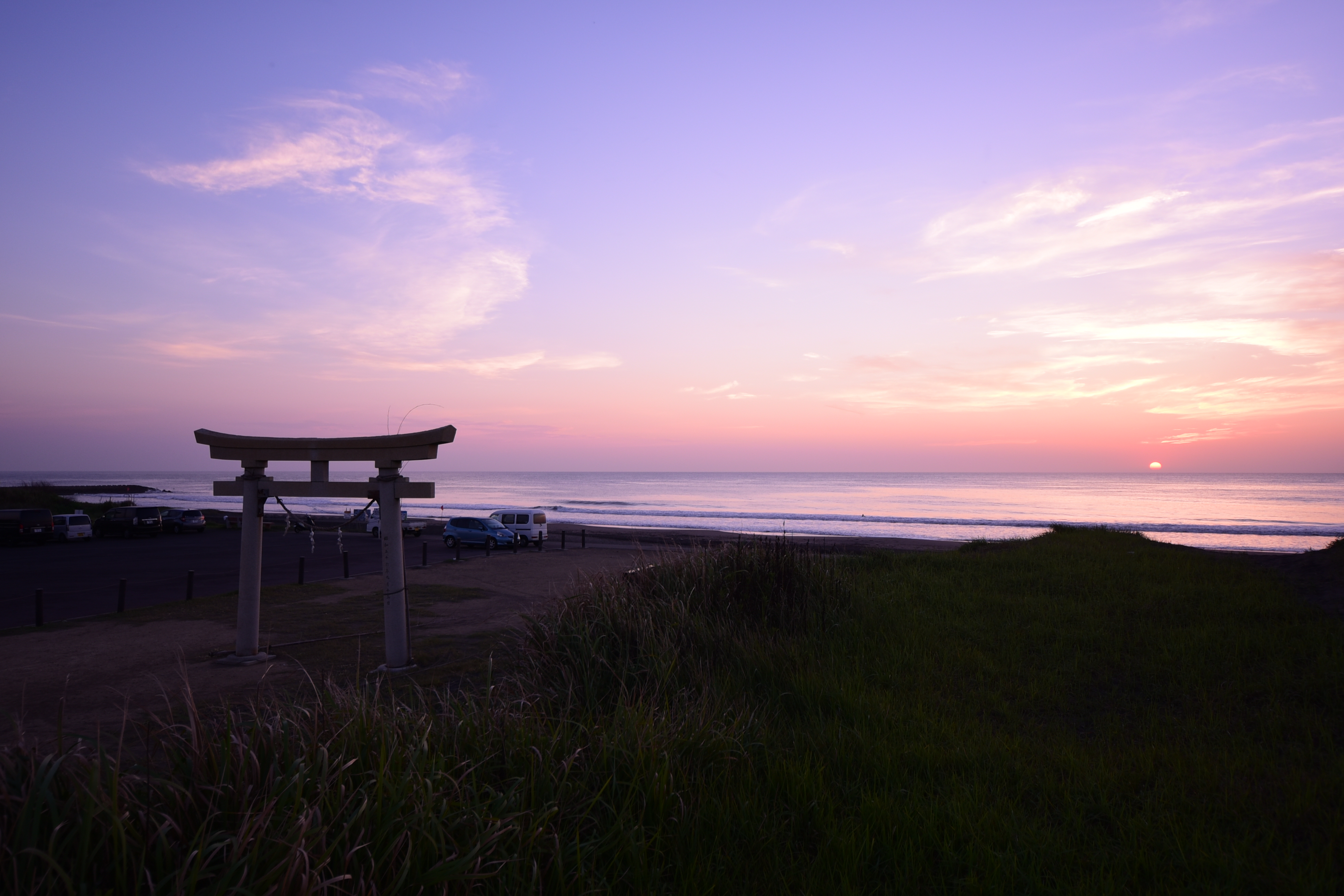
Tsurigasaki Surfing Beach

Kujūkuri Beach (九十九里浜, Kujūkuri-hama) is a sandy beach that occupies much of the northeast coast of the Bōsō Peninsula in Chiba Prefecture, Japan. Kujūkuri Beach is a popular swimming and surfing destination for inhabitants of Greater Tokyo. The beach is protected as part of Kujūkuri Prefectural Natural Park.

The beach is approximately 60 kilometres (37 mi) long, making it the second longest beach in Japan.

== Geography ==
Kujūkuri Beach extends in the shape of an arc from Cape Gyōbumi in Asahi to the north to Cape Taitō in Isumi, Chiba Prefecture to the south. The beach is relatively straight, in contrast to the typically irregular coastlines of Japan. The tides and the Kuroshio Current create sand deposits along the length of the beach which form sand dunes of 4 metres (13 ft) to 6 metres (20 ft). Kujūkuri Beach has no reef.

The coastal region of the beach is the north-eastern end of Kuroshio Current influence in Japan.

== Municipalities ==
Kujūkuri Beach extends across ten municipalities in Chiba Prefecture. They include:

- Asahi
- Sōsa
- Yokoshibahikari
- Sanmu
- Kujūkuri
- Ōamishirasato
- Shirako
- Chōsei
- Ichinomiya
- Isumi

== Etymology ==
"Kujūkurihama" literally means "ninety nine ri (sandy) beach". Minamoto no Yoritomo was thought to order the measurement of the beach, and 99 arrows were stuck on the sand—one every ri. The unit "ri" was then 6 chō (approx. 660 m), but later the ri extended to 36 chō (ca. 3.9 km). The short ri of 6 chō has long been forgotten or not in use, thus today many believe and explain incorrectly that 99 is just an inference of its long distance. The actual length of the beach is approximately 66 km, making the original measurement by Minamoto no Yoritomo an accurate one.

== History ==
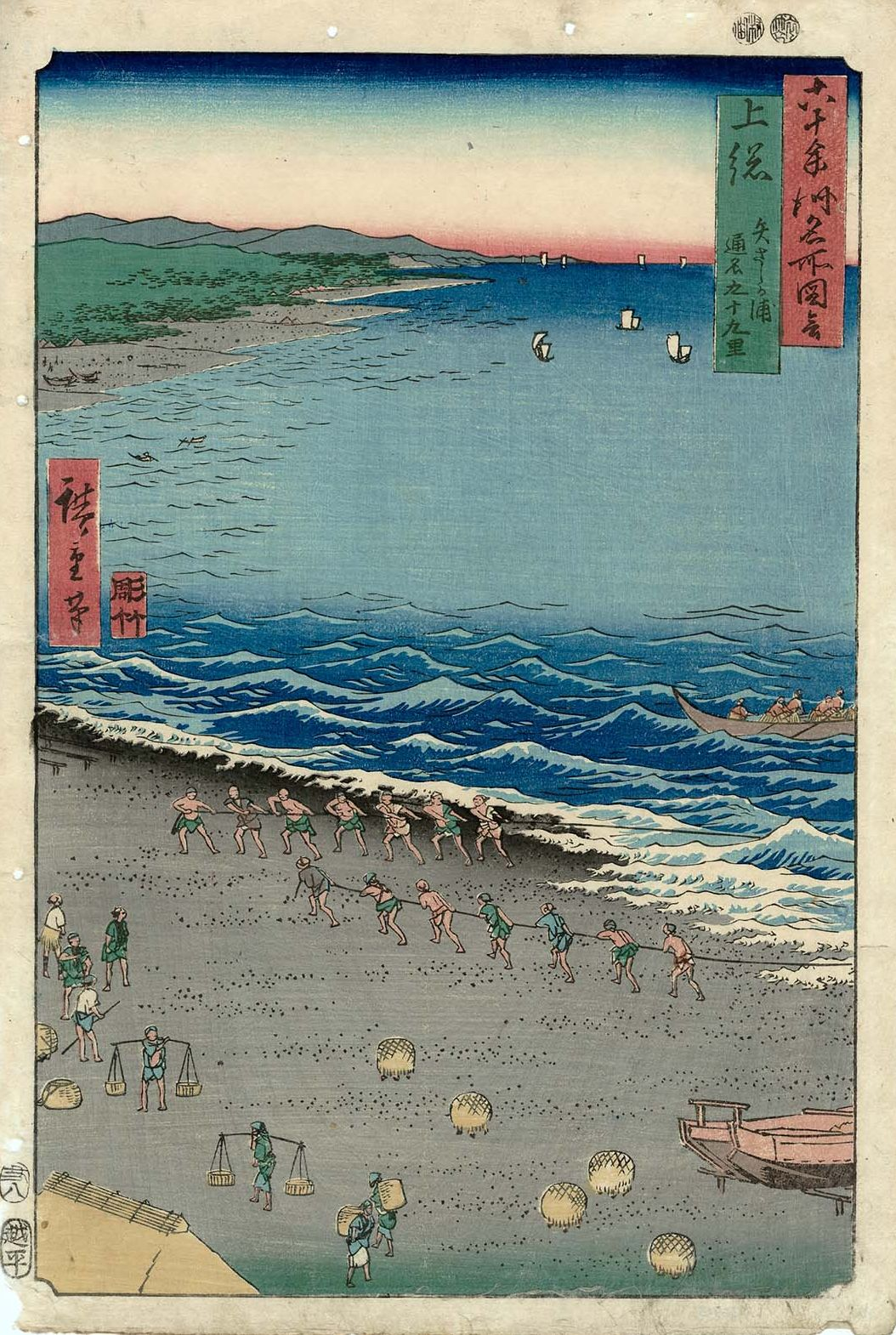
Hiroshige

In the Edo period (1603 – 1868) a new fishing net technology was brought from Kii Province, a province that covered present-day Wakayama Prefecture, as well as the southern part of Mie Prefecture. Seine fishing was introduced via trade maritime routes along the Kuroshio Current. Seine fishing, whereby a fishing net hangs vertically in the water with its bottom edge held down by weights, its top edge is buoyed by floats, and is held by fishermen or boats at either end. The introduction of seines allowed for the large-scale fishing of sardines in the region. Kujūkuri Beach became a noted center for the production of hoshika, or dried sardines. After the beginning of the Meiji period in the 19th century motorboats were used to support the net.

In the last days of World War II, the Allied forces planned to land on Kujūkuri Beach in Operation Coronet. Japan's failure to complete the beach's defences on schedule contributed to Emperor Hirohito's decision to surrender.

Kujūkuri has been a major location regarding Japanese surfing, particularly at Taito Beach. The inaugural tournament of surfing at the Olympics happened in 2021 at Tsurigasaki Beach, located at the southern end of the beach in Ichinomiya.

== Flora and fauna ==
A northern species chum salmon returns to a river of the beach every year, the southernmost in Japan. According to a programme of NHK, Kujūkuri is the best place in Japan to observe the sanderling. These tiny birds can be seen on most spring and autumn days following the ebb and flow of the waves at amazing speeds in search of food. Kujūkuri Beach is a noted area for sardine fishing. Japanese black pines have been planted along the length of the beach to prevent erosion.

== In popular culture ==
The song Omoide no Kujukurihama (Kujukuri Beach of Memories), by girl group Mi-Ke, peaked at #5 on Oricon and 32 overall on the Japanese record charts in 1991, and was the theme song for the melodrama Nurse Station on TBS. It has been covered numerous times by other performers.

== See also ==
- Shichirigahama - a similarly named beach in Kanagawa Prefecture
