= Cape Hachiman (Isumi, Chiba) =

Geographical feature in Japan

Coordinates: 35°15′1″N 140°24′25″E

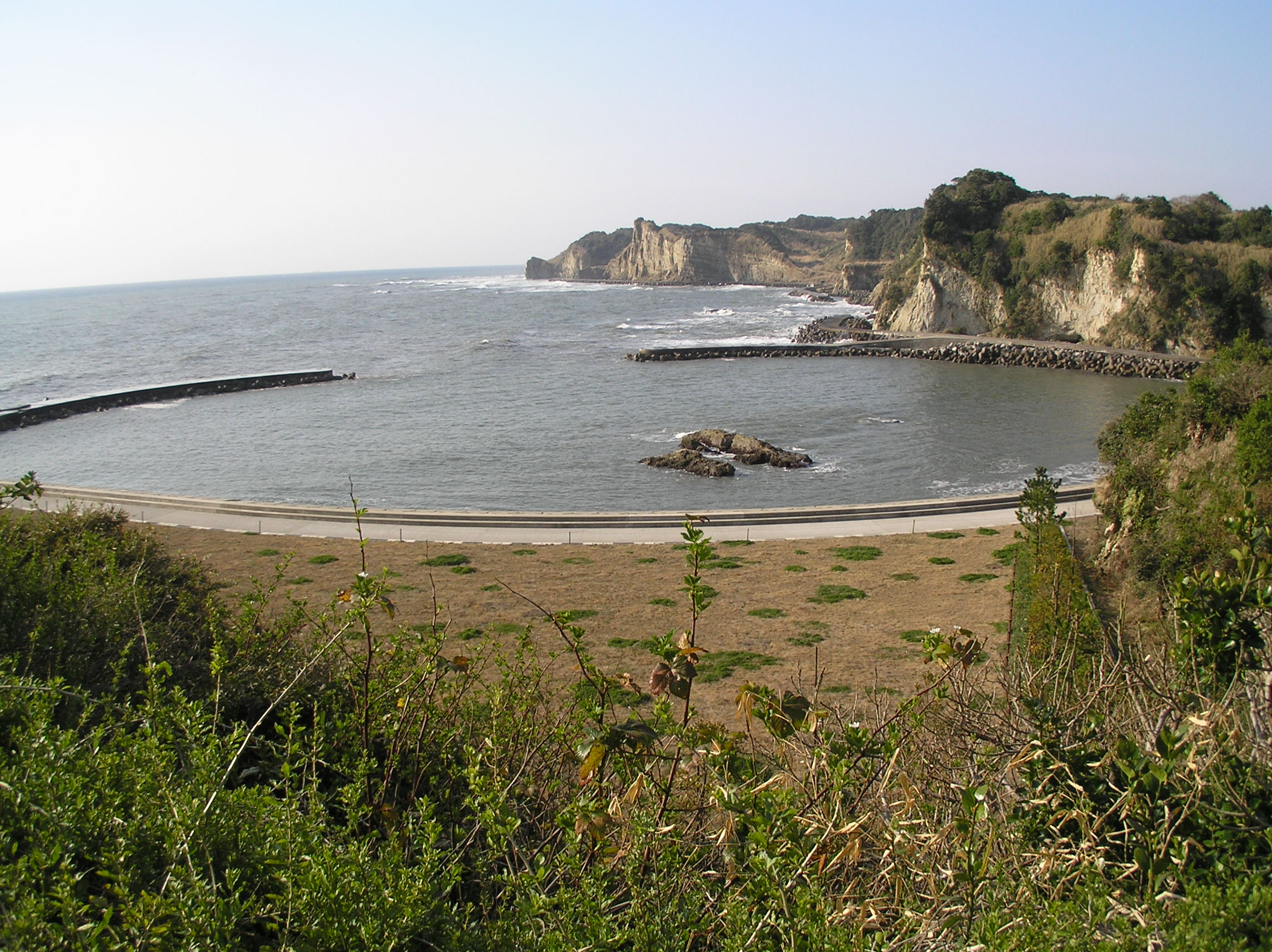
Cape Hachiman in Ohara, Isumi City, Japan

Cape Hachiman (Isumi, Chiba) (八幡岬, Hachiman-misaki) is a cape on the Pacific Ocean, in the Ōhara area of the city of Isumi, in the southeast area of Chiba Prefecture, Japan. The cape is named after Hachiman, a mythological Japanese god of archery and war. There is another identically-named cape a few kilometers to the south in the city of Katsuura City, sharing the namesake.

== Geography ==
Cape Hachiman overlooks the Tangaura inlet and consists of several picturesque steep sea cliffs. Further south are several sandy beaches. It is notably the home of the Ōhara Fishing Port. At the precipice of the cape, there is a popular tourist esplanade, which can be dangerous on the days of high waves.

== Cape Hachiman in Literature ==
The dramatic landscape of Cape Hachiman has been featured in numerous works of Japanese literature, notably in several haiku. In modern times the manga artist and essayist Yoshiharu Tsuge lived for a time in the city as a child, and remains a frequent visitor to the cape and its fishing port. The cape was the subject of Tsuge's 1967 work Umibe no Jokei.

== Transportation ==
Cape Hachiman is 20 minutes by foot from the JR East Sotobō Line Ōhara Station.
