= Ōhara, Chiba =

Ōhara 大原町
- Former municipality
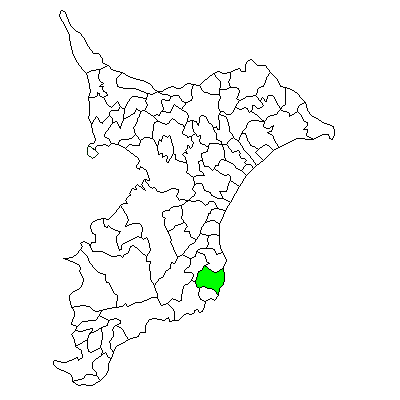
- Location of Ōhara in Chiba Prefecture

- Location in Japan
- Coordinates: 35°15′03″N 140°23′19″E
- Country: Japan
- Region: Kantō
- Prefecture: Chiba Prefecture
- District: Isumi,
- Merged: December 5, 2005 (now part of Isumi)

Area
  - Total: 66.61 km^{2} (25.72 sq mi)

Population (April 1, 2005)
  - Total: 20,518
  - Density: 308/km^{2} (800/sq mi)
- Time zone: UTC+09:00 (JST)
- Symbols
- Flower: Lilium auratum
- Tree: Camellia

Ōhara (大原町, Ōhara-machi) was a town located in Isumi District, Chiba Prefecture, Japan.

== History ==
Ōhara was formed on March 31, 1955, by the merger of the villages of Tōkai, Azuma and Namihana.

A temple bell was commissioned for the Choei-ji Buddhist temple in 1686, and is now the oldest surviving bell in Chiba. The temple was closed during the Meiji era shinbutsu bunri, and the bell surrendered to the military government to be melted down during World War II to support the war effort.

Following the Japanese surrender, the USS Duluth was stationed in Kawasaki during the occupation where the crew found the bell and decided to take it as a war prize. When the Duluth returned home to the U.S. to be decommissioned in 1949, the bell was donated to her namesake where it was discovered by a visiting Japanese academic who recognized its significance in 1951 and asked for it back. Then mayor George Johnson enlisted the US Navy to facilitate its return to Japan in 1954, and began a relationship between the cities that was formalized in a sister city agreement in 1990. Both the original bell and a replica donated to Duluth in 1993 are proudly displayed in their respective cities as a symbol of peace and friendship between the two countries. The relationship was reaffirmed with Isumi when the towns merged and continues to this day.

On December 5, 2005, Ōhara was merged into the towns of Isumi (former) and Misaki (both from Isumi District), to create the city of Isumi, and thus no longer exists as an independent municipality.

== Population ==
In November 2005 (the last data available before its merger into Isumi), the town had an estimated population of 20,518 and a population density of 308 persons per km^{2}. Its total area was 66.61 km^{2}.

== Economy ==
The town's economy was largely based on commercial fishing.

The town was a sister city of Duluth, Minnesota in the United States.
