= Cape Hachiman (Katsuura, Chiba) =

Cape in Chiba Prefecture, Japan

Coordinates: 35°8′7.48″N 140°18′40.8″E

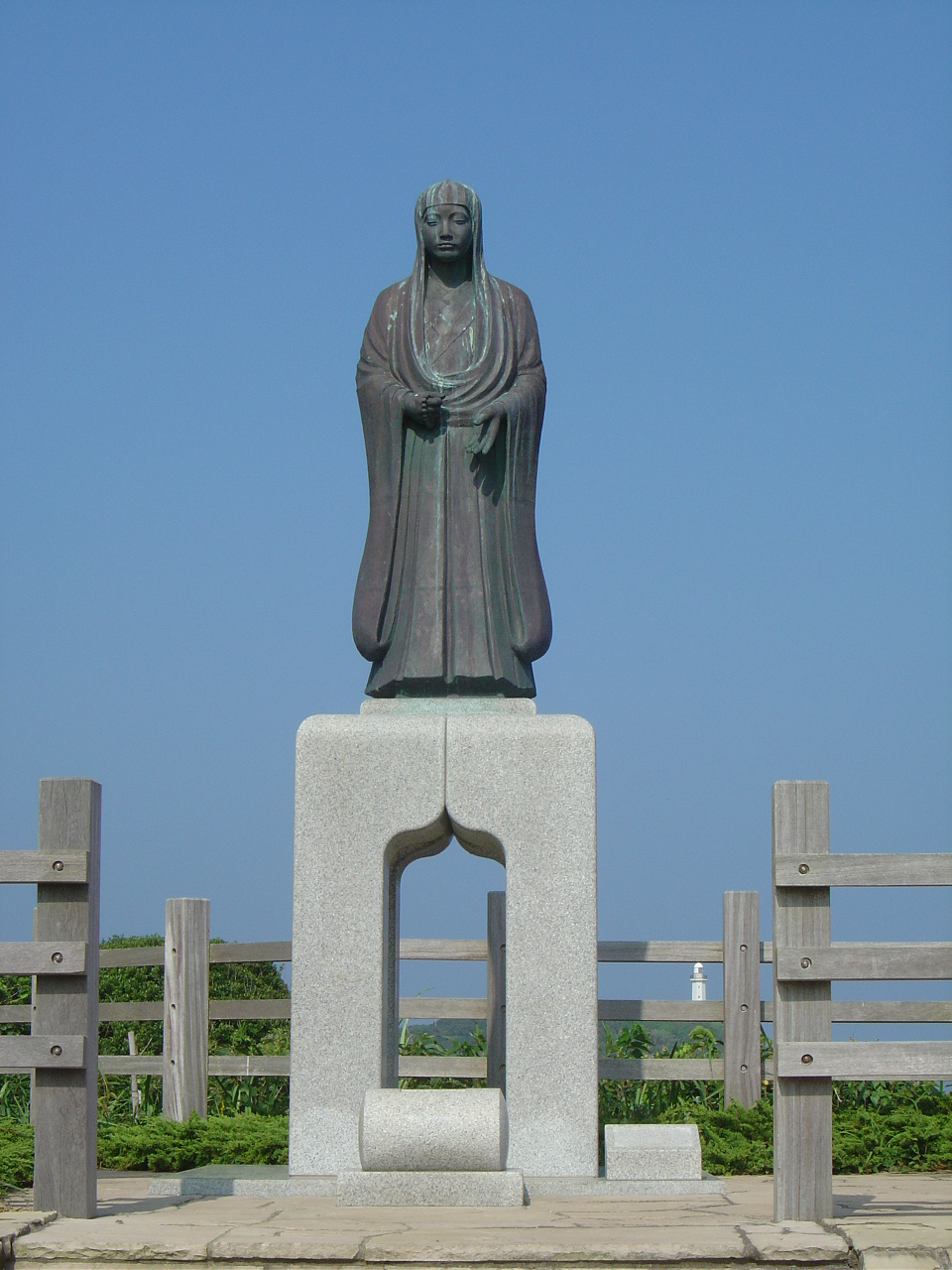
Bronze statue of Yōjuin in Cape Hachiman Park

Cape Hachiman (八幡岬, Hachiman-misaki) is a cape on the Pacific Ocean, in the city of Katsuura, in the southeast area of Chiba Prefecture, Japan. There are two Cape Hachimans located near one another: Cape Hachiman in Katsuura, and Cape Hachiman a few kilometers to the north in Isumi City. The cape is named after Hachiman, a mythological Japanese god of archery and war.

== Geography ==
The cape consists of steep 40-meter high sea cliffs. It is rich in subtropical vegetation. Especially noteworthy are the Castanopsis tree, an evergreen of the beech family, and in the tabu species of laurel.

== History ==
Cape Hachiman was known as a natural point of maritime defense at least as early as the Heian period. The ruins of Katsuura Castle are located prominently on the cape. The castle was built in the 10th century, while Cape Misaki was part of Kazusa Province. The castle is traditionally thought to be constructed by the Okiyo no Ōkimi clan of Kazusa Province. It was later transferred to the powerful Masaki branch of the Satomi clan of Awa Province. In 1549 the Satomi clan relinquished the castle to Toyotomi Hideyoshi, who destroyed it.

== Cape Hachiman Park ==
Cape Hachiman Park was established to include access to the cape, the remains of Katsuura Castle, and the Katsuura Lighthouse. Cape Hachiman is home to a small shrine, the Hachiman Shrine. The park includes the grave of 130 soldiers who died in a shipwreck off the coast of Katsuura during the Boshin War (1868–1869). The park is also home to a large bronze statue of Yōjuin, a favored concubine of Toyotomi Hideyoshi.

== Transportation ==
The cape can be accessed via the JR East Sotobō Line Katsuura Station.
