= Isumi =

Isumi いすみ市
- City
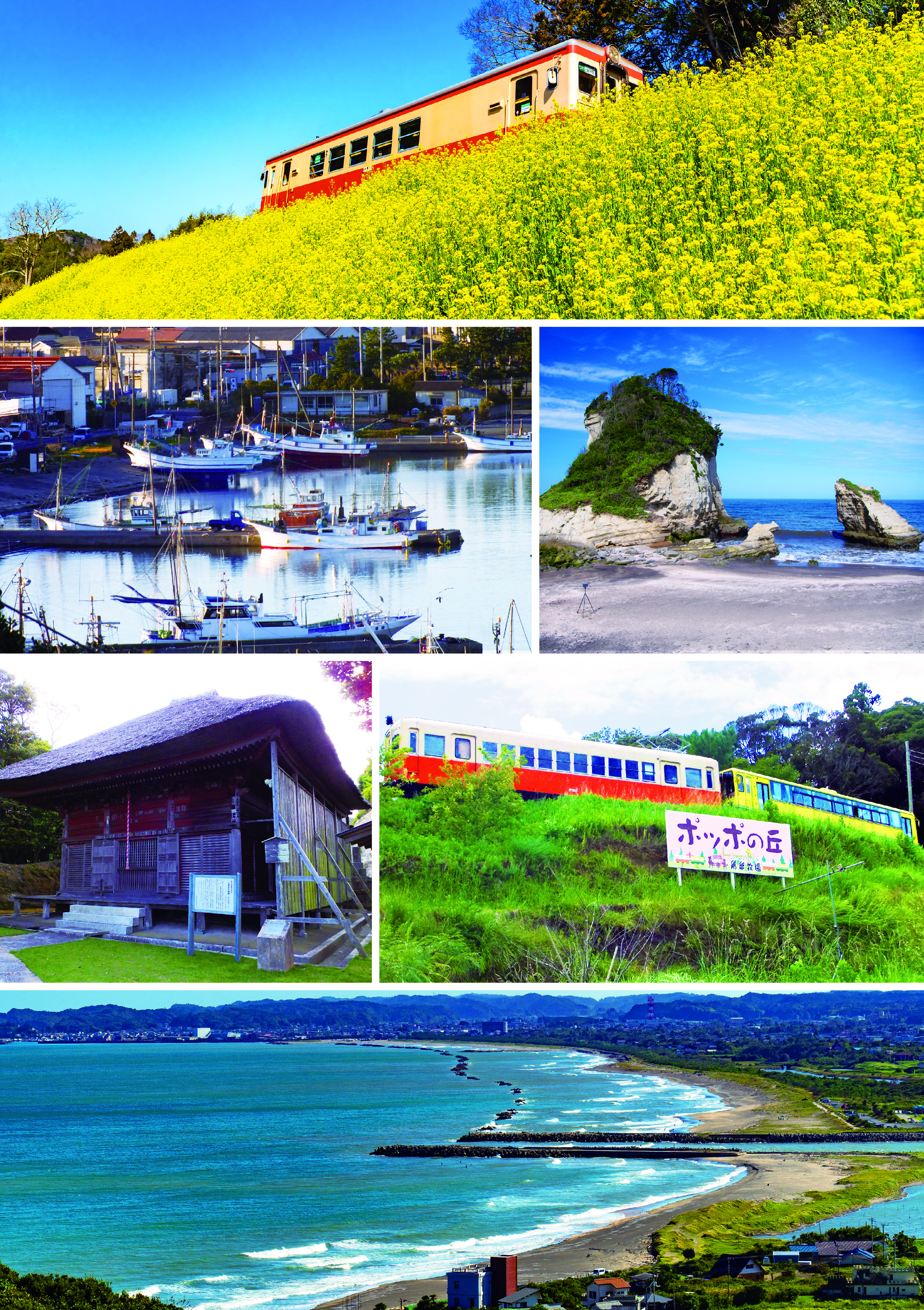
- Isumi Railway; Ohara Fishing Port • Tsutsugaura Meoto Iwa; Daishō-ji • Popo Hill; Cape Taitō

- Flag Emblem

- Location of Isumi in Chiba Prefecture

- Coordinates: 35°15′14.1″N 140°23′6.7″E
- Country: Japan
- Region: Kantō
- Prefecture: Chiba

Government
  - Mayor: Hiroshi Ōta (2005-present)

Area
  - Total: 157.44 km^{2} (60.79 sq mi)

Population (November 2020)
  - Total: 37,206
  - Density: 236.32/km^{2} (612.06/sq mi)
- Time zone: UTC+9 (Japan Standard Time)
- Address: 7400 Ōhara, Isumi-shi, Chiba-ken 298-8501
- Website: Official website

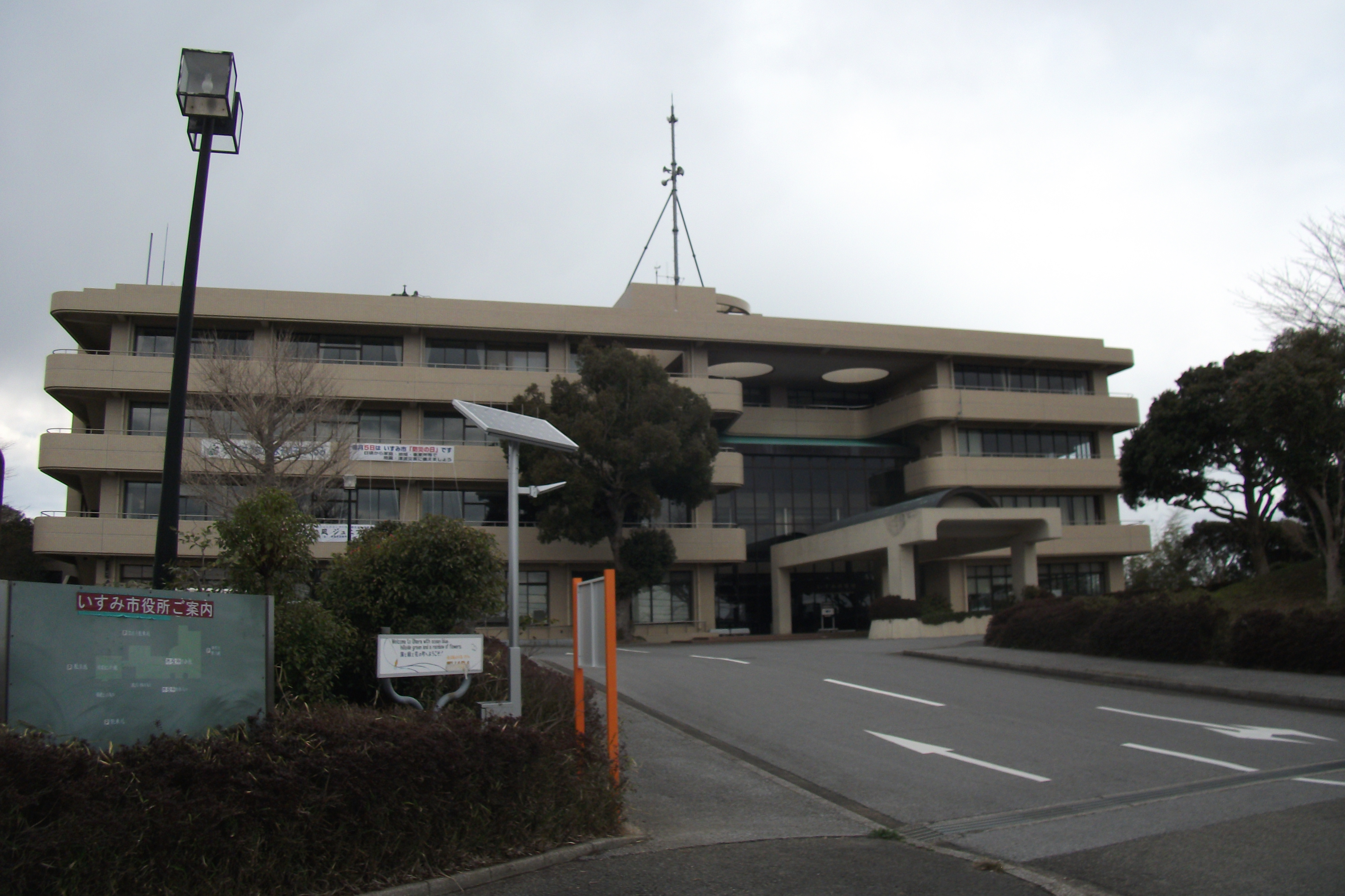
Isumi City Hall

Isumi (いすみ市, Isumi-shi; Japanese pronunciation: [í.sɨ̀.mʲì, -sɨ́.mʲí.ɕì]) is a city in Chiba Prefecture, Japan. As of 1 November 2020, the city had an estimated population of 37,206 in 17,004 households and a population density of 240 persons per km^{2}. The total area of the city is 157.44 square kilometres (60.79 sq mi).

== Geography ==
Isumi is located on the east coast of southern Chiba Prefecture, on the Bōsō Peninsula. It is bordered by the Pacific Ocean to the east, and enjoys a temperate maritime climate, with short, cool winters and hot, humid summers due to the effects of the Kuroshio Current offshore. The area is noted for its beach resorts, which are at the end of the Kujūkuri Beach area, and the landscape consists of rolling, sandy hills. The Isumi River, a small river which runs through this portion of the peninsula, empties into the Pacific Ocean at Misaki. Parts of the city are within the Minami Bōsō Quasi-National Park. Mount Arakine is the highest point in the city, with an elevation of 157.8 meters. The city is approximately 45 kilometers from the prefectural capital of Chiba and 70 to 80 kilometers from central Tokyo.

=== Surrounding municipalities ===
Chiba Prefecture

- Ichinomiya
- Katsuura
- Mutsuzawa
- Onjuku
- Ōtaki

=== Climate ===
Isumi has a humid subtropical climate (Köppen Cfa) characterized by warm summers and cool winters with light to no snowfall. The average annual temperature in Isumi is 15.4 °C. The average annual rainfall is 1834 mm with September as the wettest month. The temperatures are highest on average in August, at around 25.8 °C, and lowest in January, at around 6.0 °C.

== Demographics ==
Per Japanese census data, the population of Isumi has declined in recent decades

Historical population
Year	Pop.	±%
1950	54,556	—
1960	48,395	−11.3%
1970	43,112	−10.9%
1980	42,816	−0.7%
1990	43,431	+1.4%
2000	42,835	−1.4%
2010	40,962	−4.4%
2020	35,544	−13.2%

== History ==
Isumi is part of ancient Kazusa Province. The place name is very ancient, appearing even in the Nihon Shoki, which mentions the area as the source of abalone and pearls for the Yamato court during the reign of the Kofun period Emperor Ankan. During the Edo period, the area was mostly tenryō territory ruled by various hatamoto on behalf of the Tokugawa shogunate. The village of Kuniyoshi was established within Isumi District, Chiba with the establishment of the modern municipalities system on April 1, 1889. It was raised to town status on September 22, 1894. The town of Isumi was established on April 29, 1955 from the merger of Kuniyoshi Town with the neighboring villages of Nakagawa and Chimachi.

The city of Isumi was created on December 5, 2005 when the former town of Isumi absorbed the neighboring towns of Misaki and Ōhara (all from Isumi District).

== Government ==
Isumi has a mayor-council form of government with a directly elected mayor and a unicameral city council of 18 members. Isumi contributes one member to the Chiba Prefectural Assembly. In terms of national politics, the city is part of Chiba 11th district of the lower house of the Diet of Japan.

== Economy ==
The local economy is dominated by commercial fishing. Ise-ebi, a species of spiny lobster, is a notable product of Isumi, as are sardines and Japanese amberjack. The middle reaches of the Isumi River provide irrigation for extensive paddy fields for rice production in Isumi. The area also produces tomatoes and cucumbers. The economy is supplemented by the summer tourist traffic to the local beach resorts. The border between Ichinomiya and Isumi City starts at the southern end of the 60-km Kujūkuri Beach adjacent to Taito port. Taito beach and areas to the north are noted surfing areas. The surfing competition at the 2020 Olympic Games was held at Shidashita Beach just north of Isumi.

== Transportation ==
Isumi is approximately 1 hour and 10 minutes from Tokyo Station by limited express train via Ōhara Station on the JR East Sotobō Line. Ōhara Station is also the connecting point for the JR East Sotobō Line and the Isumi Railway Company Isumi Line, which connects the Pacific Coast of east Chiba Prefecture to the interior areas of the Bōsō Peninsula.

=== Railway ===
JR East – Sotobō Line

- Taitō - Chōjamachi - Mikado - Ōhara - Namihana

– Isumi Railway Company - Isumi Line

- Ōhara - Nishi-Ōhara - Kazusa-Azuma - Nittano - Kuniyoshi - Kazusa-Nakagawa

=== Highways ===
- National Route 465

== Local attractions ==
- Cape Taitō Lighthouse, Cape Taitō, Misaki
- Kiyomizu-dera (Isumi, Chiba) - one of the Bandō Sanjūsankasho Buddhist temples

== Notable people from Isumi ==
- Akemi Masuda, marathon runner
- Kasuganishiki Takahiro, sumo wrestler
- Yoshiharu Tsuge, manga artist

== Sister cities ==
- Duluth, Minnesota, United States, since October 3, 1990 (with former Ōhara Town)
- Waupun, Wisconsin, United States, since August 29, 1995 (with former Isumi Town)
