= Misaki, Chiba =

Misaki 岬町
- Former Town
- Flag Emblem

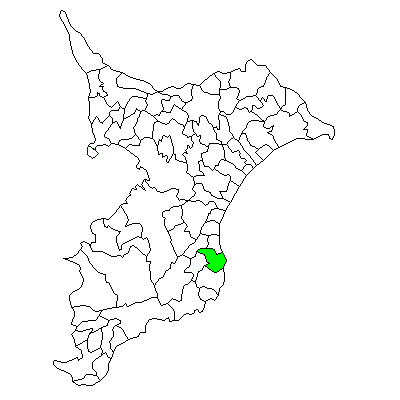
- Location of Misaki in Chiba Prefecture

- Location in Japan
- Coordinates: 35°17′48″N 140°23′24″E
- Country: Japan
- Region: Kantō
- Prefecture: Chiba Prefecture
- District: Isumi
- Merged: December 5, 2005 (now part of Isumi)

Area
  - Total: 46.66 km^{2} (18.02 sq mi)

Population (April 1, 2005)
  - Total: 15,273
  - Density: 327.3/km^{2} (848/sq mi)
- Time zone: UTC+09:00 (JST)
- Symbols
- Tree: Ume

Misaki (岬町, Misaki-machi) was a town located in Isumi District, Chiba Prefecture, Japan.

== History ==
=== Establishment ===
The town of Misaki was created on August 1, 1961, when the towns of Chōjamachi and Taitō merged together.

=== Dissolvement ===
On December 5, 2005, Misaki was merged into the towns of Isumi (former) and Ōhara (both from Isumi District), to create the city of Isumi, and thus no longer exists as an independent municipality.

In 2005 (the last data available before merged into Isumi), the town had an estimated population of 15,273 and a density of 327.3 persons per km^{2}. Its total area was 46.66 km^{2}.

The town's economy was largely based on commercial fishing.
