= Isumi River =

River in Chiba Prefecture, Japan

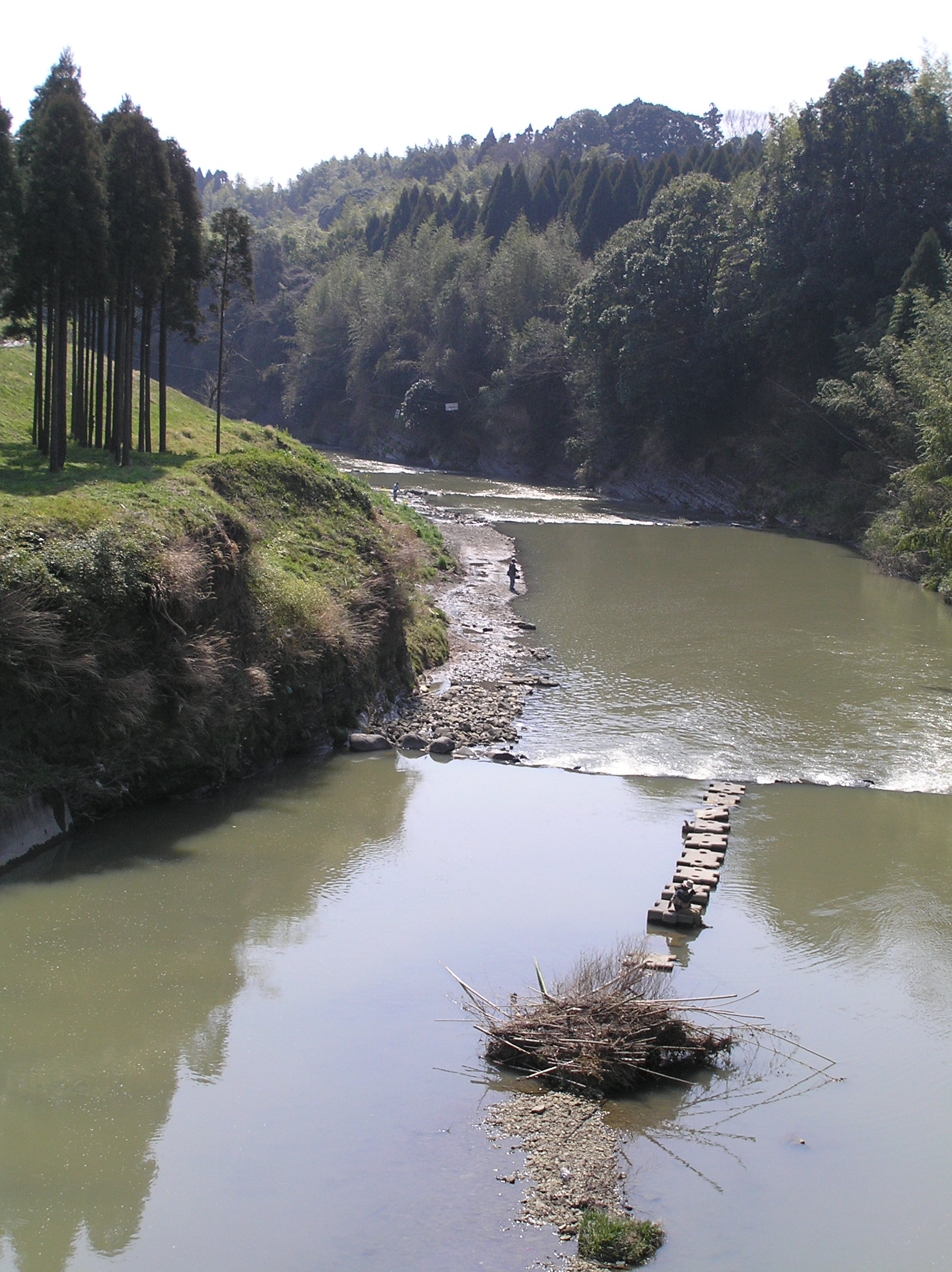

- Native name: 夷隅川 (Japanese)

Location
- Country: Japan

Physical characteristics
- Source
  - location: Katsuura, Chiba Kamiueno District
- Mouth
  - location: Pacific Ocean
  - coordinates: 35°17′41″N 140°24′31″E
  - elevation: 0 m (0 ft)
- Length: 68 km (42 mi)
- Basin size: 299 km^{2} (115 sq mi)

The Isumi River (夷隅川, Isumigawa) is a river in Chiba Prefecture, Japan. It is 68 kilometers (42 mi) in length and has a drainage area of 299 square kilometers (115 sq mi). Under the Rivers Act of 1906 the Isumi is designated as a Class 2 River. Additionally, the government has designated the Isumi River a national-level Natural Monument (天然記念物, tennen kinenbutsu).

== Geography ==
The source of the Isumi River is in the Kamiueno District of Katsuura City. It meanders through Ōtaki and Isumi City and pours into the Pacific Ocean south of Cape Taitō in the Misakichoizumi District in the northeast of Isumi City. The riverbed consists primarily of shale and has few sandy areas.

=== Tributaries ===
- Koshinden River
- Nishihata River
- Ōno River
- Ochiai River
- Matsumaru River
- Kamioki River
- Shiigi River
- Ebado River
- Shin River

== Ecology ==
Two species of oak are found on the upper parts of the river and Japanese cedar on the middle and lower parts of the river. The riverbanks of the Isumi are known for their dense bamboo thickets. Fish in the river include the endangered Tokyo bitterling, ayu, medaka, freshwater eel, Japanese dace, and other species of carp. Chiba Prefecture is carrying out some work on improving the environment of the Isumi River in Ōtaki area.

== Use ==
The middle and lower parts of the river provide extensive irrigation to paddy fields, which have historically made the area rich in rice production. The Isumi Line of the Isumi Railroad Company largely follows the course of the river. Historically the Isumi River provided a natural defense of Ōtaki Castle and its associated jōkamachi castle town.
