= Kazusa-Ichinomiya Station =

Railway station in Ichinomiya, Chiba Prefecture, Japan

Kazusa-Ichinomiya Station 上総一ノ宮駅
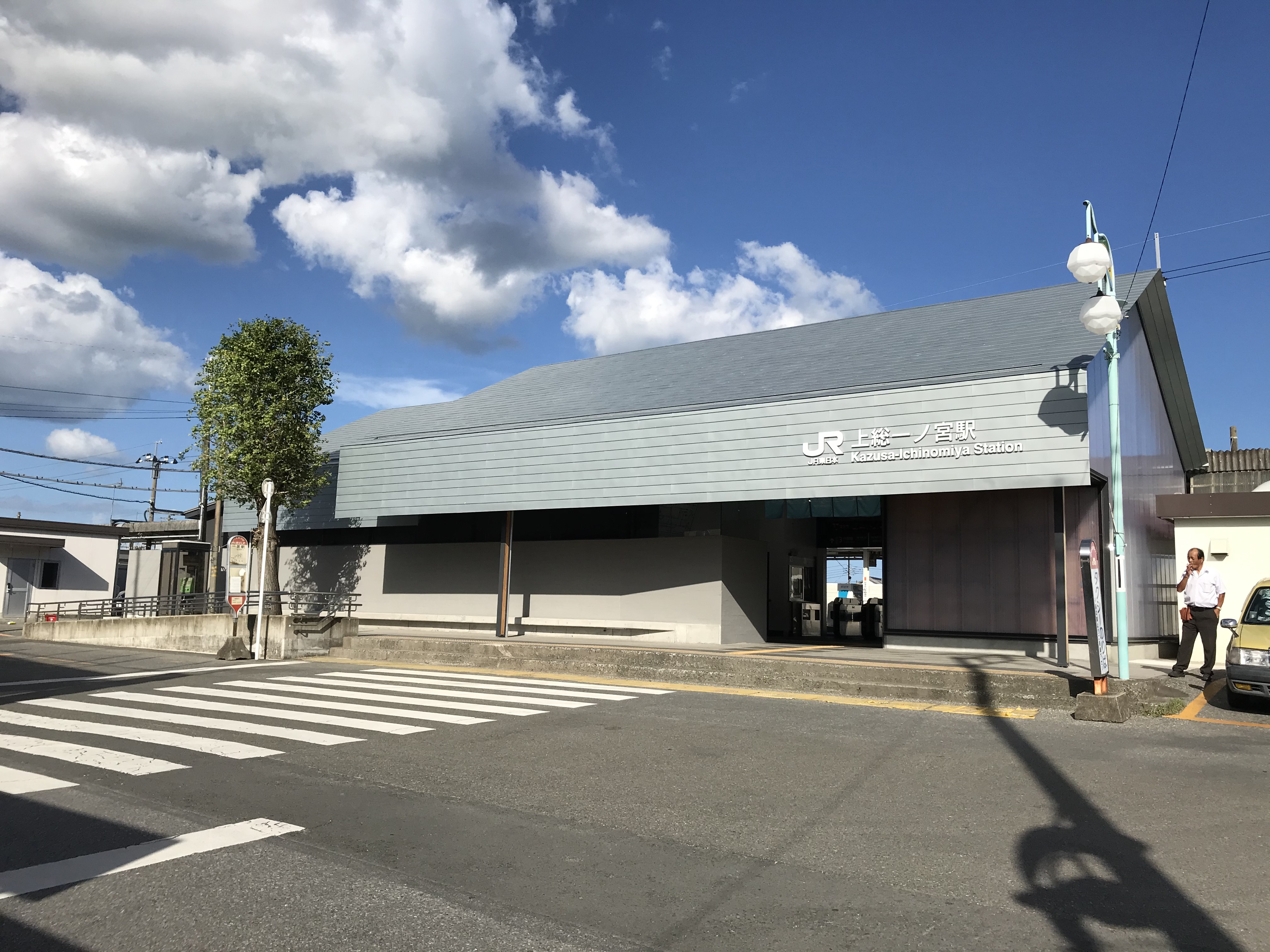
- Kazusa-Ichinomiya Station, September 2020

General information
- Location: Ichinomiya 2640, Ichinomiya-machi, Chōsei-gun, Chiba-ken 299-4301; Japan
- Coordinates: 35.3736°N 140.3653°E
- Operator: JR East
- Line: ■ Sotobō Line
- Distance: 43 kilometres (27 mi) from Chiba
- Platforms: 1 side + 1 island platform
- Tracks: 3
- Connections: Bus stop

Other information
- Status: Staffed (Midori no Madoguchi )
- Website: Official website

History
- Opened: 17 April 1898; 128 years ago
- Former names: Ichinomiya (until 1917)

Passengers
- FY2019: 2976 daily

Services
Preceding station	JR East	Following station
Mobara towards Tokyo	Wakashio	Ōhara towards Awa-Kamogawa
Yatsumi (limited service) towards Soga	Sotobō Line Keiyō Rapid	Torami towards Katsuura
Mobara towards Chiba	Sotobō Line Sobū Rapid	Terminus
Yatsumi towards Soga or Chiba	Sotobō Line Local	Torami towards Awa-Kamogawa
Location
- Location within Chiba Prefecture Location within Japan

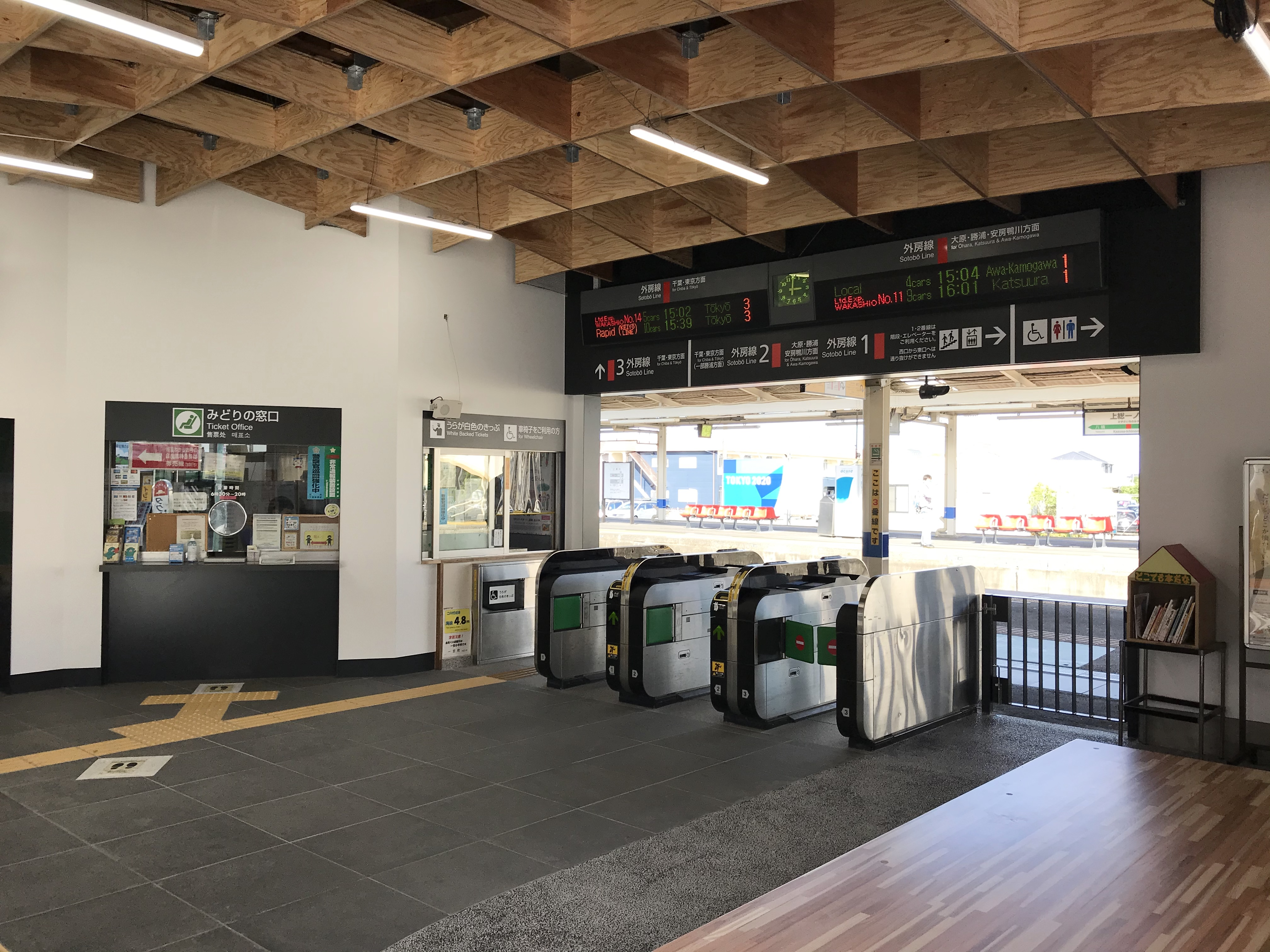
Ticket gate

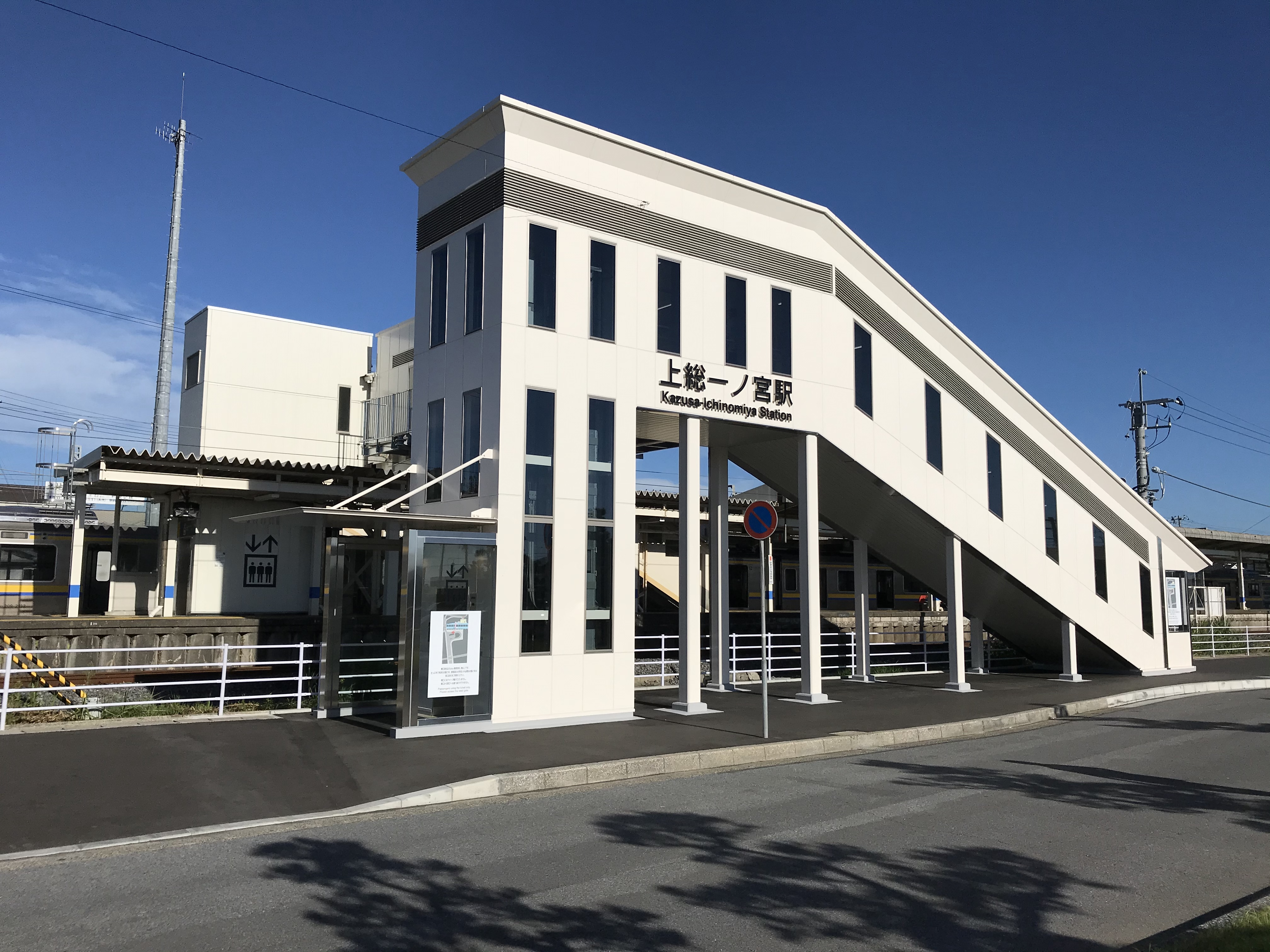
east exit

Kazusa-Ichinomiya Station (上総一ノ宮駅, Kazusa-Ichinomiya-eki) is a passenger railway station located in the town of Ichinomiya, Chiba Prefecture Japan, operated by the East Japan Railway Company (JR East).

== Lines ==
Kazusa-Ichinomiya Station is served by the Sotobō Line, and lies 43.0 km (26.7 mi) from the starting point of the line at Chiba Station.

== Station layout ==
The station consists of a single island platform and a single side platform serving three tracks, connected to a white-washed station building by an footbridge. The station has a Midori no Madoguchi staffed ticket office.

=== Platform ===
1	■ Sotobō Line	Katsuura, Awa-Kamogawa
2	■ Sotobō Line	bi-directional traffic
3	■ Sotobō Line	For Mobara, Soga, Chiba

== History ==
Kazusa-Ichinomiya Station was opened on 17 April 1898 as Ichinomiya Station (一ノ宮駅, Ichinomiya-eki) on the Bōsō Railway. The line was further extended to Chiba by 13 December 1899. On 1 September 1907, the Bōsō Railway was nationalized and became part of the Japanese Government Railways, which was transformed into the Japan National Railways (JNR) after World War II. The station name was changed to the present name on 1 January 1917. Freight operations were discontinued on 1 July 1971. The station was absorbed into the JR East network upon the privatization of the Japan National Railways on 1 April 1987.

== Passenger statistics ==
In fiscal year 2019, the station was used by an average of 2,976 passengers daily (boarding passengers only).

== Surrounding area ==
- National Route 128
- Chiba Prefectural Ichinomiya Commercial High School

== See also ==
- List of railway stations in Japan
