= Mobara Station =

Railway station in Mobara, Chiba Prefecture, Japan

Mobara Station 茂原駅
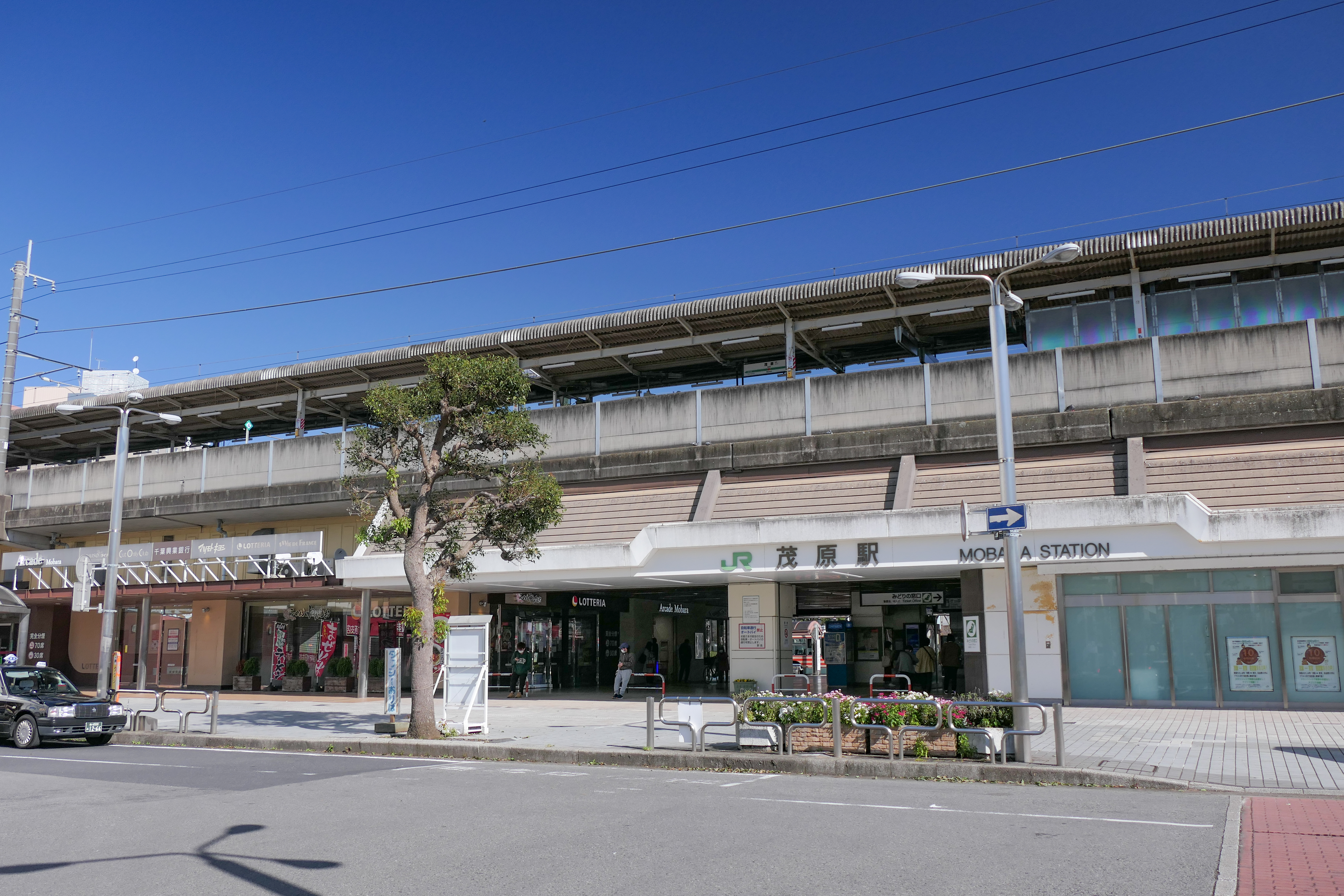
- Mobara Station south exit in 2021

General information
- Location: 1 Machibo, Mobara-shi, Chiba-ken 297-0022; Japan
- Coordinates: 35.4269°N 140.304°E
- Operator: JR East
- Line: ■ Sotobō Line
- Distance: 34.3 km from Chiba
- Platforms: 2 island platforms
- Tracks: 4
- Connections: Bus stop

Other information
- Status: Staffed (Talking reserved-seat ticket machine(話せる指定席券売機))
- Website: Official website

History
- Opened: 17 April 1897; 129 years ago
- Former names: Mohara (until 1935)

Passengers
- FY2019: 10,901 daily

Services
Preceding station	JR East	Following station
Ōami towards Tokyo	Wakashio	Kazusa-Ichinomiya towards Awa-Kamogawa
Shin-Mobara (limited service) towards Soga	Sotobō Line Keiyō Rapid	Yatsumi (limited service) towards Katsuura
Ōami towards Chiba	Sotobō Line Sobū Rapid	Kazusa-Ichinomiya Terminus
Shin-Mobara towards Soga or Chiba	Sotobō Line Local	Yatsumi towards Awa-Kamogawa
Location
- Location within Chiba Prefecture Location within Japan

Mobara Station (茂原駅, Mobara-eki) is a passenger railway station located in the city of Mobara, Chiba Prefecture Japan, operated by the East Japan Railway Company (JR East).

== Lines ==
Mobara Station is served by the Sotobō Line, and is located 34.3 km (21.3 mi) from the starting point of the line at Chiba Station. Limited express Wakashio services from Tokyo to Awa-Kamogawa stop at this station.

== Station layout ==
The station consists of two elevated island platforms serving four tracks, with the station building underneath. The station has a Talking reserved-seat ticket machines(話せる指定席券売機).

=== Platforms ===
1	■ Sotobō Line	for Soga, Chiba, Kaihimmakuhari, and Tokyo
2	■ Sotobō Line	for Soga, Chiba, Kaihimmakuhari, and Tokyo
3	■ Sotobō Line	for Kazusa-Ichinomiya, Katsuura, and Awa-Kamogawa
4	■ Sotobō Line	for Kazusa-Ichinomiya, Katsuura, and Awa-Kamogawa

== History ==
Mobara Station opened on 17 April 1897, as Mohara Station (茂原駅, Mohara-eki) on the Bōsō Railway. It was absorbed into the Japanese Government Railways on 1 September 1907. From 1909 to 1926 it was also the terminal of the Chōnan-Mobara-Kan Jinsha Kidō (庁南茂原間人車軌道), a human-powered railway extending to Chōnan, Chiba. On 1 August 1930, the station became the terminus of the Nansō Railway (南総鉄道, Nansō Tetsudō), which became the Sotobō Line from 1939. It was renamed to its present name on 10 July 1935. It joined the JR East network upon the privatization of the Japanese National Railways (JNR) on 1 April 1987.

== Passenger statistics ==
In fiscal 2019, the station was used by an average of 10,901 passengers daily (boarding passengers only).

== Surrounding area ==
- National Route 128
- Chosei Municipal HospitalMobara City Hall

== See also ==
- List of railway stations in Japan
