= Japan–Mexico relations =

- Japan: Mexico

The nations of Japan and Mexico first established formal diplomatic relations in 1888 with the signing of the bilateral Treaty of Amity, Commerce, and Navigation. This agreement was Japan's first "equal" treaty with any country; which overshadows Tokugawa Ieyasu's pre-Edo period initiatives which sought to establish official relations with New Spain in Mexico.

== History ==
=== Early history ===
Under Spanish colonial rule, Mexico, then known as New Spain, controlled the trade routes between Manila, capital of the Philippines and the Mexican port of Acapulco. Through this trade route, Spanish galleons sailed from Acapulco to the Philippines and traded with neighboring countries/territories within the vicinity. Some of those territories were the islands of Japan. In Manila, Japanese trading boats would bring food and other goods to trade with the New Spanish government. From Manila, Spanish vessels would transport the goods back to Acapulco, traverse the Mexican terrain until they reached the port of Veracruz and from there transport the goods onto another Spanish vessel to Spain.

In the mid-1500, Spanish Jesuits, many of them born in New Spain, began to arrive to Japan to preach Christianity. In 1597, general Toyotomi Hideyoshi, who is accredited with uniting the islands of Japan, prohibited the teaching of Christianity and ordered all missionaries to leave Japan. Several Jesuits did not leave and they were executed in Nagasaki.

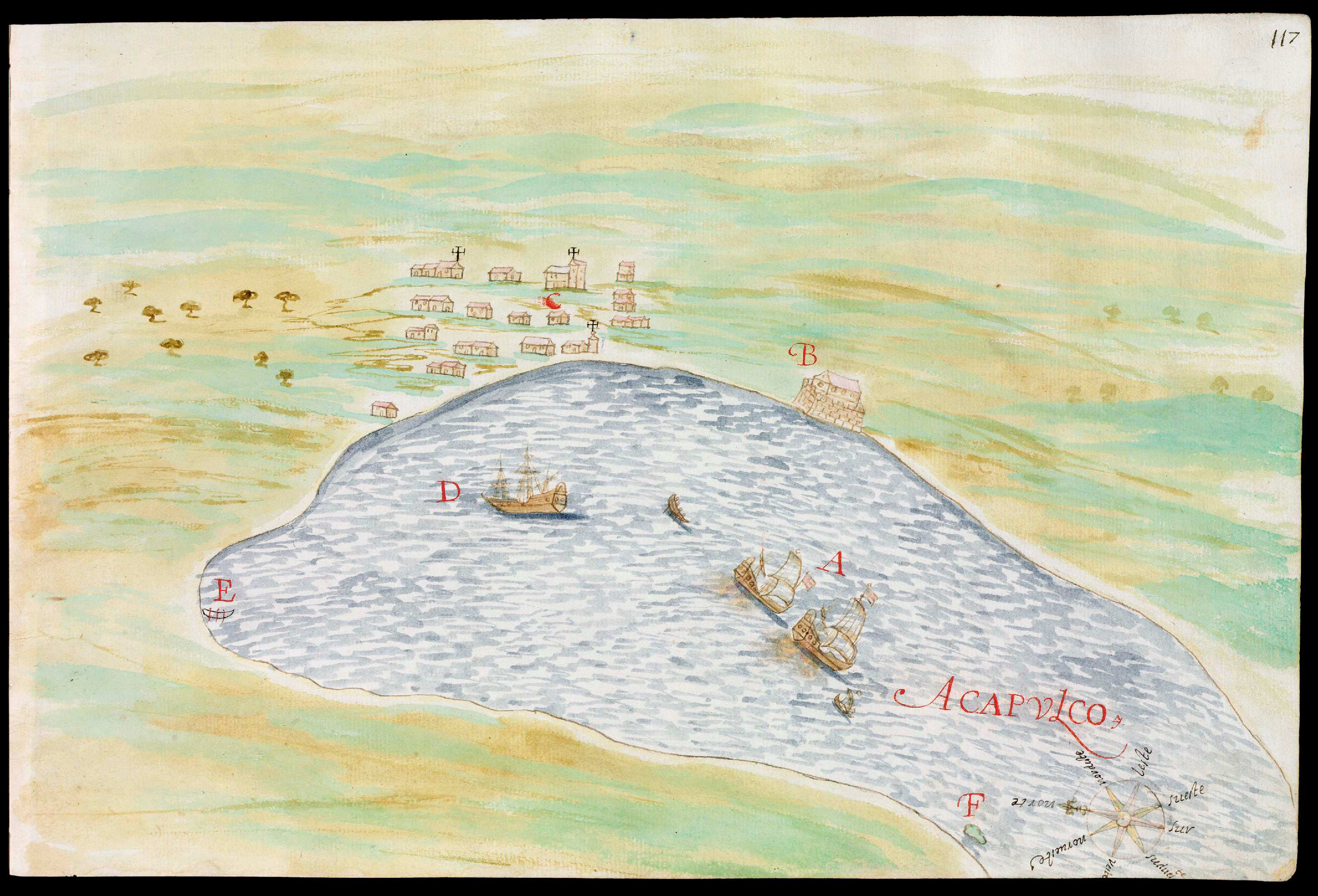
San Juan Bautista ship docked in Acapulco bay in 1614

In 1609, a Spanish galleon called San Francisco capsized near Ōtaki, Chiba while making its way from Manila to Acapulco. 370 castaways were rescued by Japanese fisherman. Among those rescued was the New Spanish governor of the Philippines; Rodrigo de Vivero. In Japan, de Vivero was able to travel to Tokyo and met with high level dignitaries and establish direct commercial relations between Japan and the Spanish empire via the Philippines. After spending some time travelling throughout the Japanese islands, de Vivero returned to Acapulco with a new ship built in Japan called the San Buenaventura and with some Japanese men on board. Once in Acapulco, de Vivero brought his mission to Mexico City and met with the Spanish viceroy, Luis de Velazco and communicated to him his report. In March 1611, the Spanish viceroy Veleazco sent a mission directly from Acapulco to Japan thanking the Japanese government for assisting his governor de Vivero and reimbursed them for the ship San Buenaventura, and giving them gifts in homage, one of them being a clock made in Madrid and it was to be the first clock that people of Japan had ever seen before.

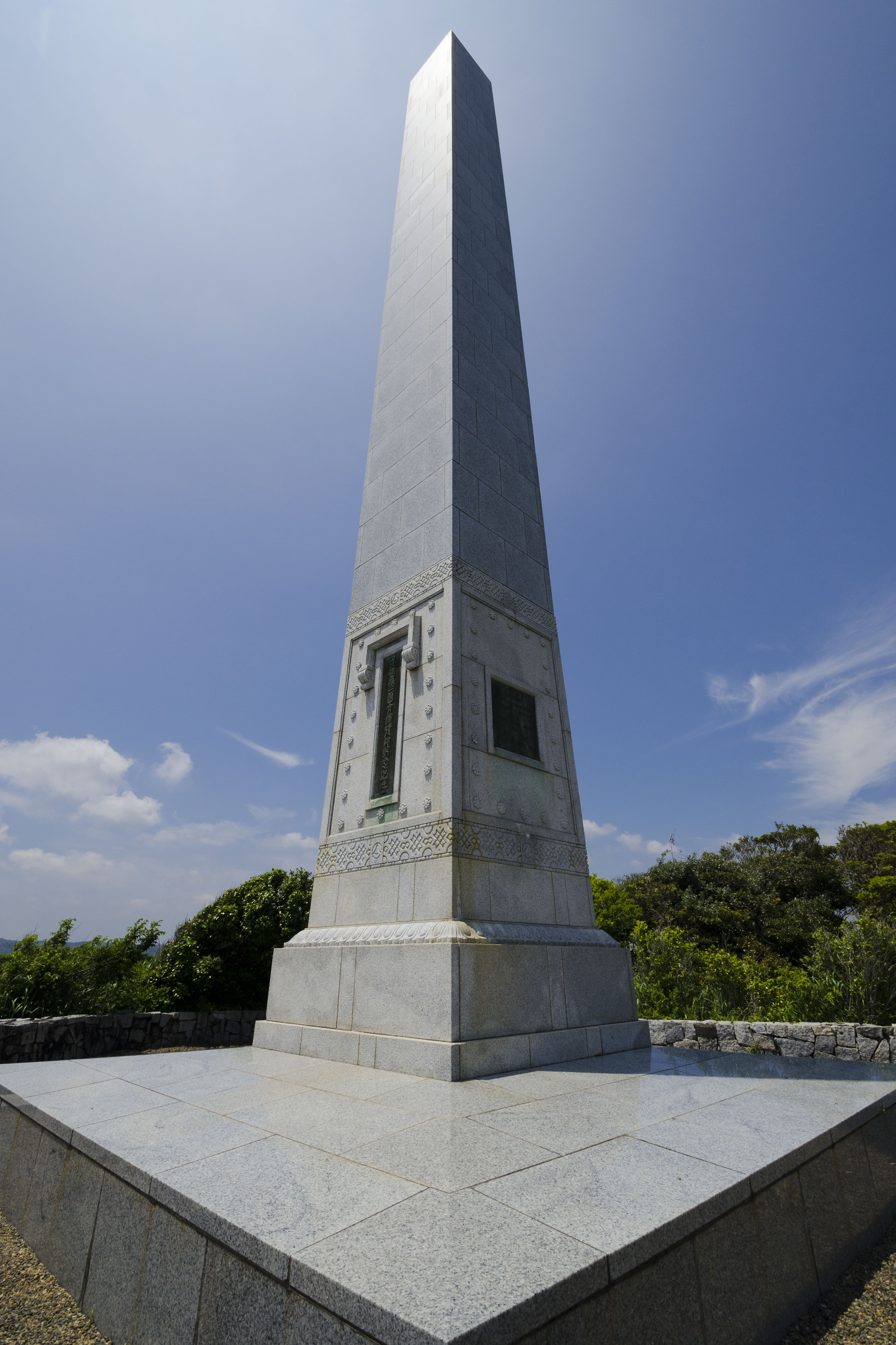
Birthplace Monument of Traffic and Friendship between Japan, Spain and Mexico in Onjuku, Japan

In October 1613, the first Japanese diplomatic mission was sent to New Spain by Masamune Date, a regional strongman. This diplomatic mission was to be known as the Keichō embassy and it was the second diplomatic mission to travel to Europe after the first historic mission known as the Tenshō embassy. Date had built a new exploration ship called the Date Maru or San Juan Bautista which was to take the diplomatic party to the Americas. The party left Japan on 28 October 1613 towards Acapulco with a total of around 180 people on board, including ten samurai of the shōgun Tokugawa Ieyasu, 12 samurai from Sendai, 120 Japanese merchants; and sailors.

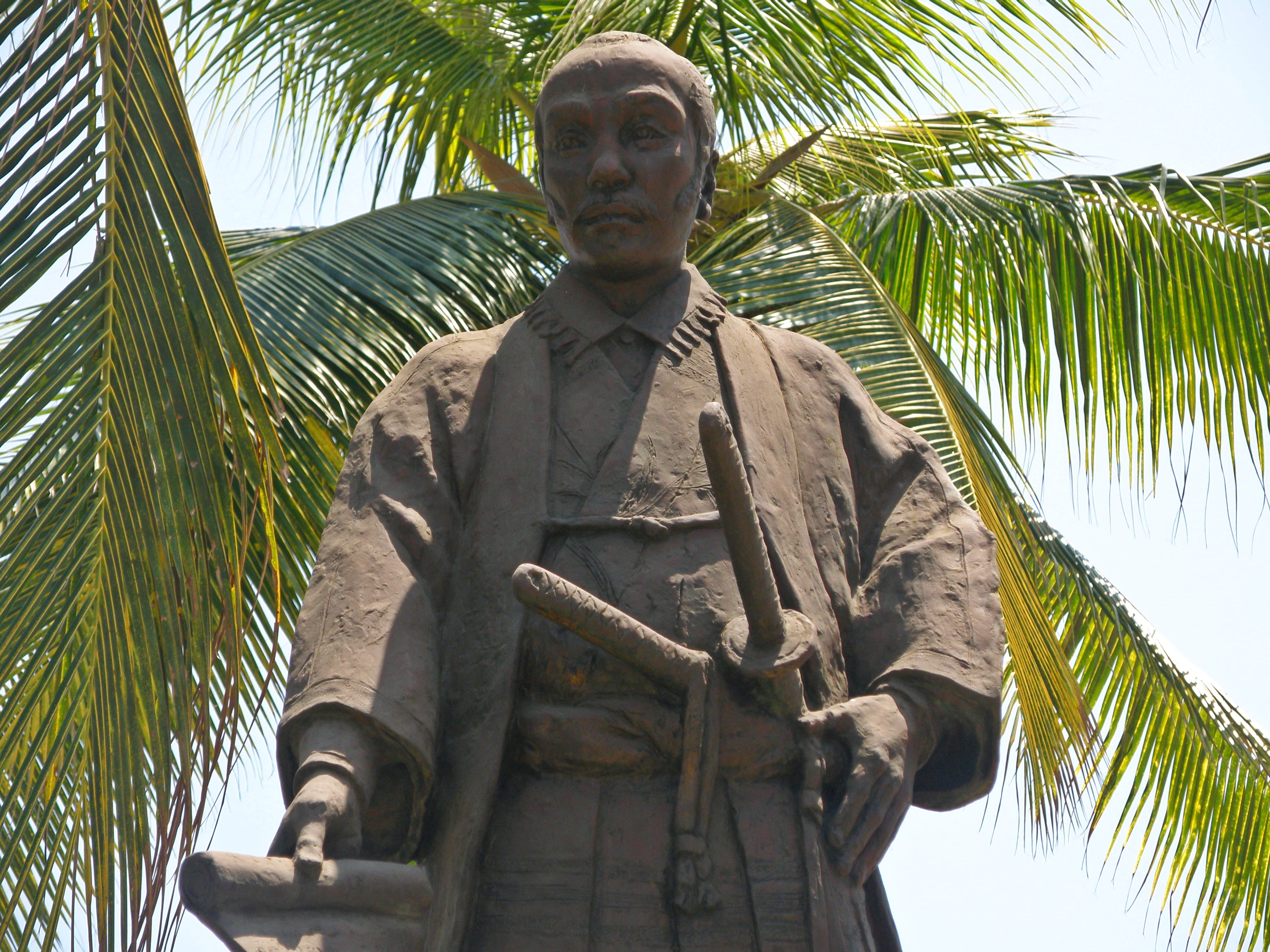
Monument to Hasekura Tsunenaga in the Plaza Japón of Acapulco, Mexico. The sculpture is a replica of a monument on the Aoba Castle grounds in Sendai, Japan.

The leader, Hasekura Tsunenaga, met with the Spanish viceroy Diego Fernández de Córdoba. When the delegation arrived in Acapulco, a fight broke out in which a Japanese samurai stabbed a Spanish colonial soldier. This was witnessed and recorded by historian Chimalpahin; who was the grandson of an Aztec nobleman. In Mexico City, Hasekura met with several colonial leaders and offered the New Spanish government free commerce between the New Spanish territories and Japan and asked for a group of Christian missionaries to return to Japan. The diplomatic mission also offered to expel both English and Dutch citizens from the country because both nations were considered at the time to be enemies of the Spanish king. In June 1614, Hasekura left New Spain via Veracruz and continued on his journey to Spain to meet with the Spanish king leaving behind a small delegation. In Spain, Hasekura was baptized a Catholic and changed his name to Francisco Felipe Faxicura. Two years later in February 1617, Hasekura/Faxicura returned from Spain to Veracruz and traveled to Mexico City. Upon arrival to Mexico City, Hasekura was surprised to see that most members of his delegation that he had left behind, had married and integrated into the Mexican community. In 1620, Hasekura and his diplomatic mission set sailed and returned to Japan. On arrival, they were confronted with the fact the country had dramatically changed since their departure in 1613 and that anything related to Christianity had been banned. Hasekura and his delegation had to renounce their adopted religion. Since Hasekura's diplomatic mission to New Spain, Japan entered a time of isolation and refused to trade with foreign nations.

=== Meiji Restoration and Porfiriato ===
After the Meiji Restoration, in which the Empire of Japan officially reestablished diplomatic relations with various governments of the world, in Mexico arose interest to initiate official relations with the Empire of Japan. The expedition from Mexico to Japan in 1874, led by the Mexican scientist Francisco Díaz Covarrubias, was the reason why formal attempts were made between representatives of the governments of both countries to have diplomatic relations. At the end of Diaz Covarrubias' report, such action was recommended.

In 1874 (53 years after Mexico declared independence from Spain in 1821), a Mexican scientific delegation headed by Francisco Díaz Covarrubias arrived in Japan to witness the transit of the planet Venus through a solar disc. Although the scientific delegation did not have much success, this mission did allow for formal diplomatic relations to begin between the two nations. In 1888 Foreign Ministers Matías Romero and Munemitsu Mutsu signed a Treaty of Amity, Commerce, and Navigation; which was to be Japan's first "equal" treaty with a foreign nation (as it did not grant Mexico any extra-territorial right or jurisdiction in Japan) and thus formally established diplomatic relations between the two nations.

The fact that Mexico agreed to sign a more just treaty in comparison to the treaties reached by other countries that favored the Europeans over the Japanese was seen as a grateful act for the Asian nation; and so the Mexican embassy in Tokyo was given a unique location right next to the Official Residence of the Prime Minister in the heart of the Japanese capital, in an area reserved for the room of senior rulers of the country. It remains there to this day.

In 1897, 35 members of the so-called Enomoto Colonization Party settle in the Mexican state of Chiapas. This was the first organized emigration from Japan to Latin America. After establishing diplomatic relations, contact between the two nations increased through trade and commerce.

In February 1913, during the Ten Tragic Days, the Japanese chargé d'affaires Kumaichi Horiguchi gave diplomatic shelter to the family of President Francisco I. Madero. Including to First Lady Sara Pérez Romero, Madero’s parents and sisters, and staff of the president.

=== World War II ===
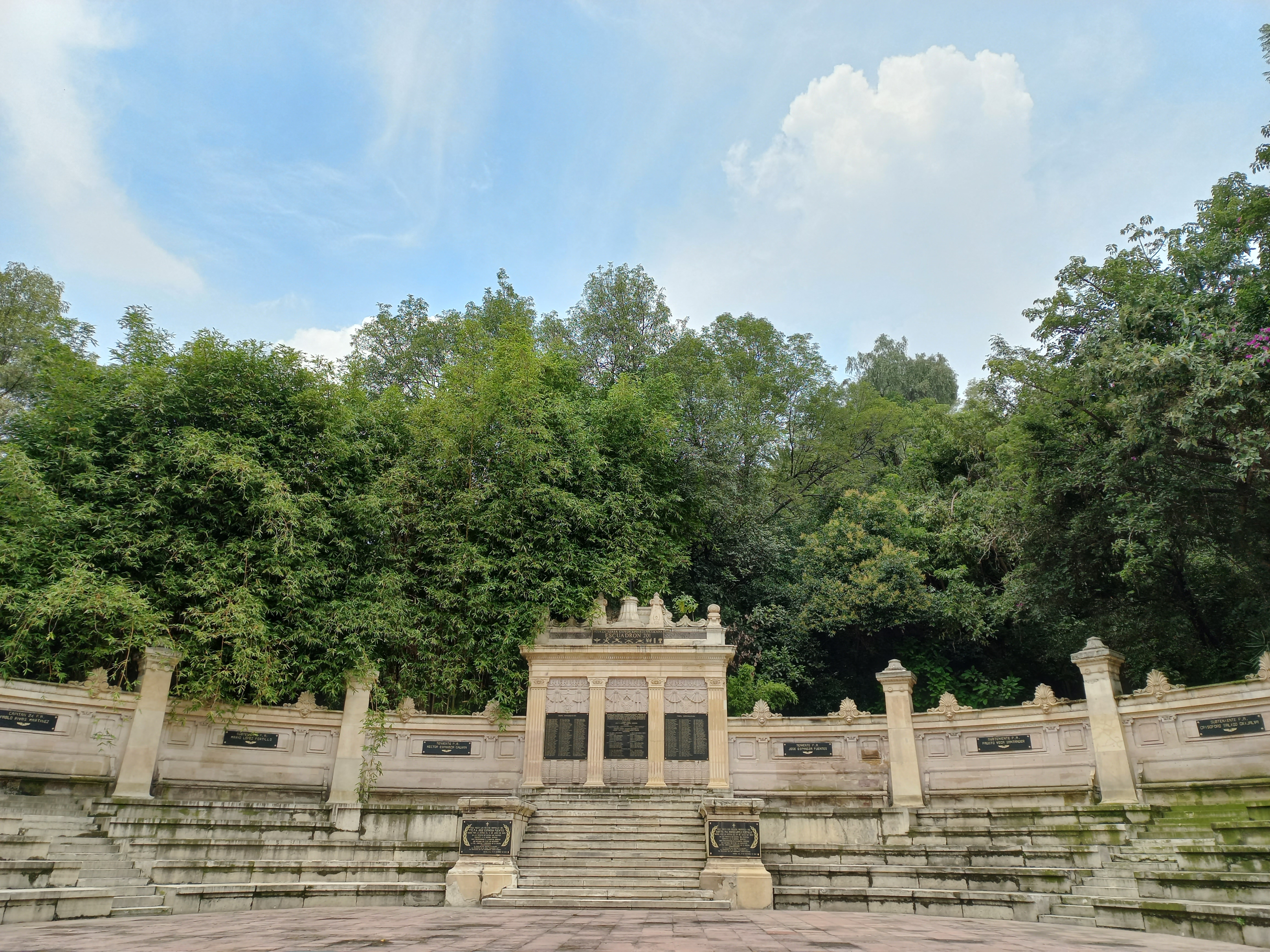
The Tribuna Monument to Squadron 201, which fought in the Philippines campaign against Imperial Japan

In 1941, Mexico closed its diplomatic legation in Tokyo and consulate in Yokohama as a result of the Japanese attack on Pearl Harbor. In May 1942, Mexico declared war on the Axis powers, which included Japan, and joined World War II. The Escuadrón 201 was a squadron of fighter planes that fought against Japanese pilots at the Battle of Luzon in the Philippines. After the war, diplomatic relations were restored and have continued unabated.

In 1952, Mexico becomes the second country to ratify the San Francisco Peace Treaty (preceded only by the United Kingdom), officially ending the state of war.

=== Contemporary relations ===
In 1959, Prime Minister Nobusuke Kishi paid a visit to Mexico, the first by a Japanese head-of-government. In 1962, Mexican President Adolfo López Mateos reciprocated the visit to Japan. In 1964, Japanese crown Prince Akihito paid a visit to Mexico. Since the initial visits, there have been several high-level visits between leaders and representatives of both nations that have occurred through to the 21st century with the latest visits by President Enrique Peña Nieto in 2013 to Japan and by Prime Minister Shinzo Abe to Mexico City in 2014.

In 2023, both nations celebrated 135 years of diplomatic relations. The current Japanese ambassador to Mexico is Noriteru Fukushima, who holds dual Mexican-Japanese citizenship owing to his birth in Mexico City. In August 2026, Japanese Foreign Minister Toshimitsu Motegi paid a visit to Mexico and met with his counterpart Roberto Velasco Álvarez. In November 2026, Mexican Foreign Secretary Velasco Álvarez reciprocated a visit to Japan.

== High-level visits ==
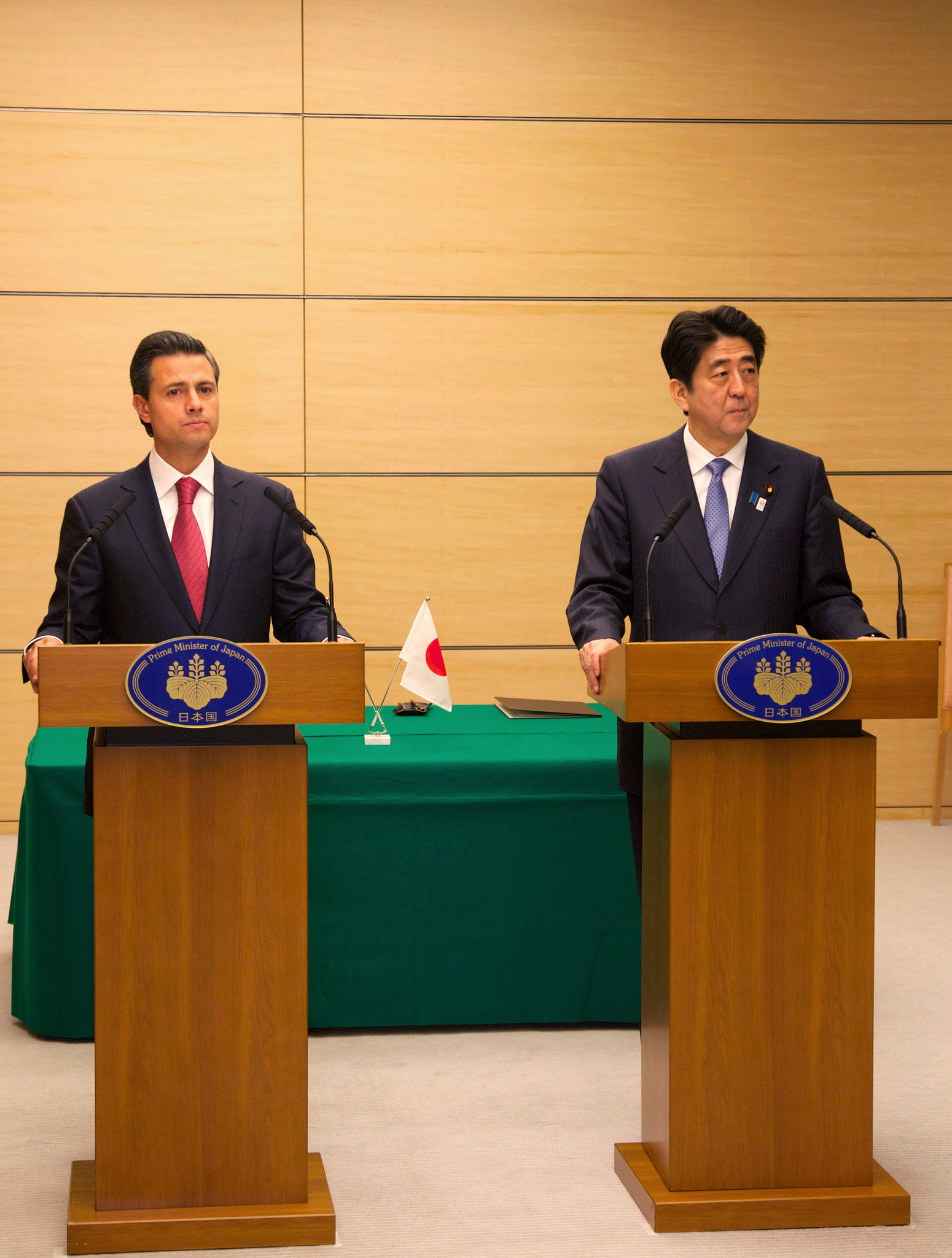
President Enrique Peña Nieto and Prime Minister Shinzo Abe at a press conference during an official visit to Japan by President Peña Nieto in April 2013.

High-level visits from Japan to Mexico

- Prime Minister Nobusuke Kishi (1959)
- Crown Prince (previous Emperor) Akihito (1964)
- Prime Minister Kakuei Tanaka (1974)
- Prime Minister Masayoshi Ōhira (1980)
- Prime Minister Zenkō Suzuki (1981)
- Prime Minister Toshiki Kaifu (1989)
- Crown Prince (current Emperor) Naruhito (1992, 2006)
- Prime Minister Ryutaro Hashimoto (1996)
- Prince Fumihito Akishino (1997, 2014)
- Prime Minister Junichiro Koizumi (2002, 2004)
- Prime Minister Yoshihiko Noda (2012)
- Prime Minister Shinzo Abe (2014)

High-level visits from Mexico to Japan

- President Adolfo López Mateos (1962)
- President Luis Echeverría Álvarez (1972)
- President José López Portillo (1978)
- President Miguel de la Madrid Hurtado (1986)
- President Carlos Salinas de Gortari (1990, 1993)
- President Ernesto Zedillo (1995, 1997, 1998)
- President Vicente Fox (2001, 2003)
- President Felipe Calderón (2008, January and November 2010)
- President Enrique Peña Nieto (2013)

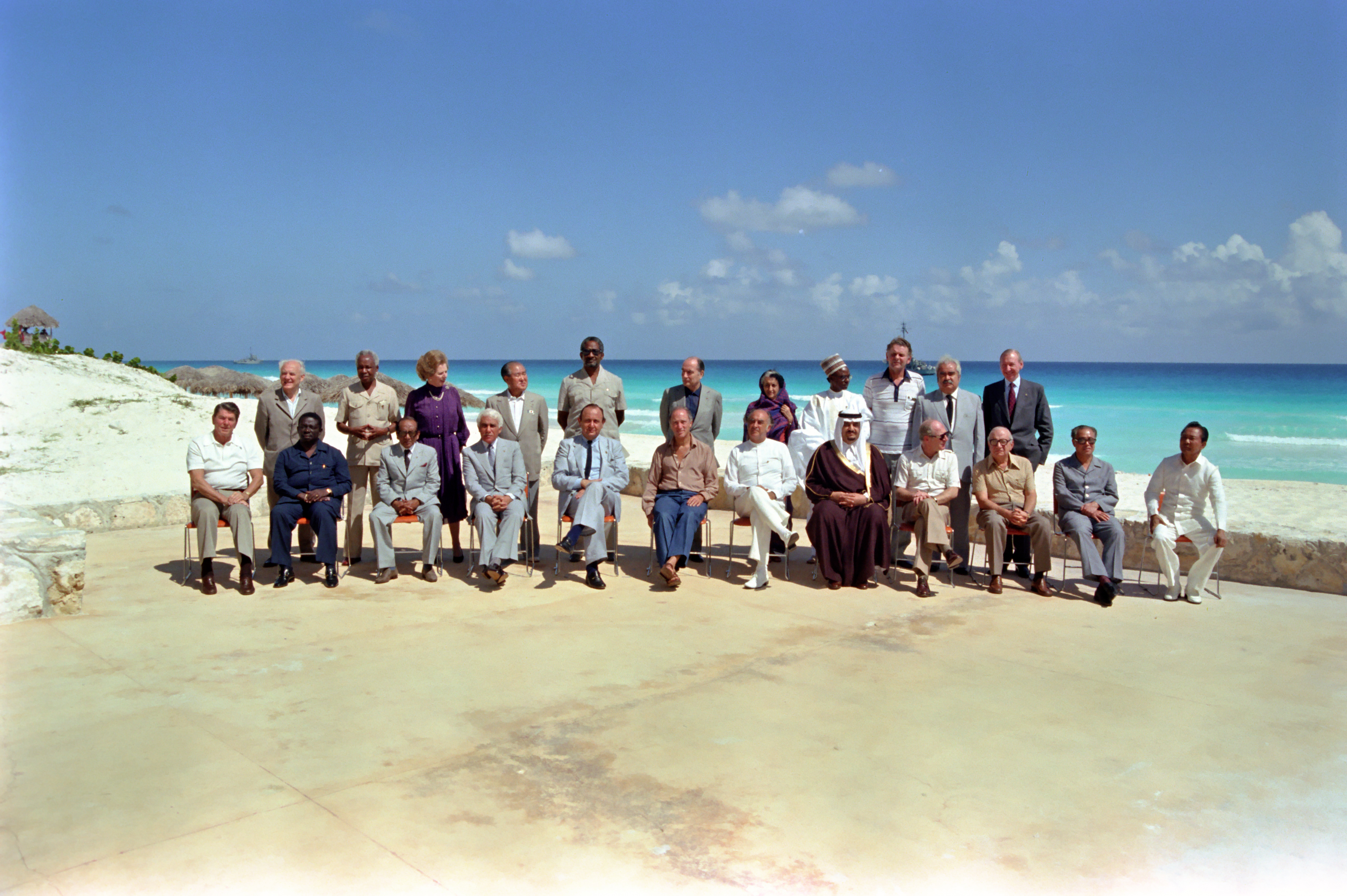
President José López Portillo and Prime Minister Zenkō Suzuki in Cancún, 1981.

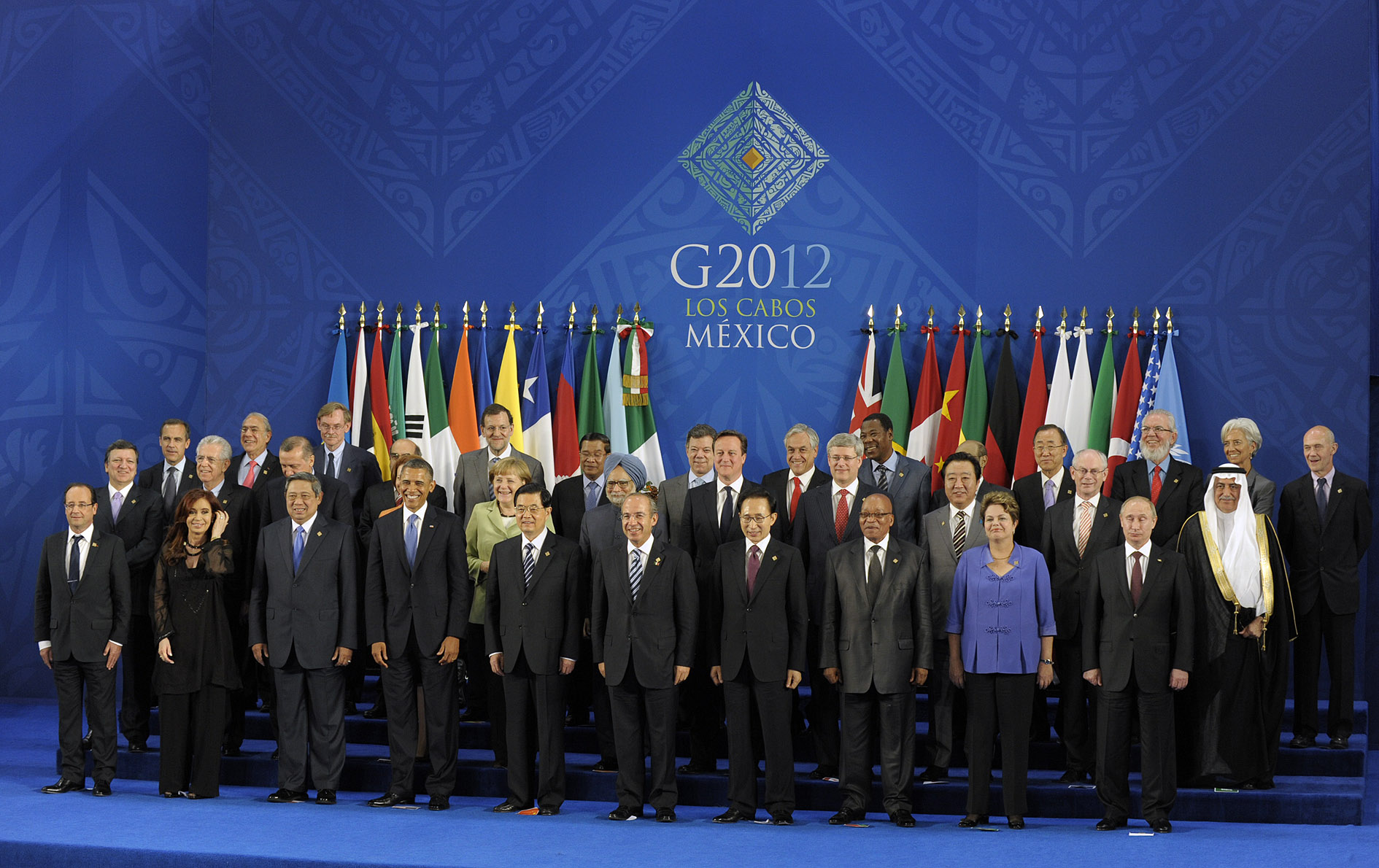
President Felipe Calderón and Prime Minister Yoshihiko Noda in Los Cabos, 2012.

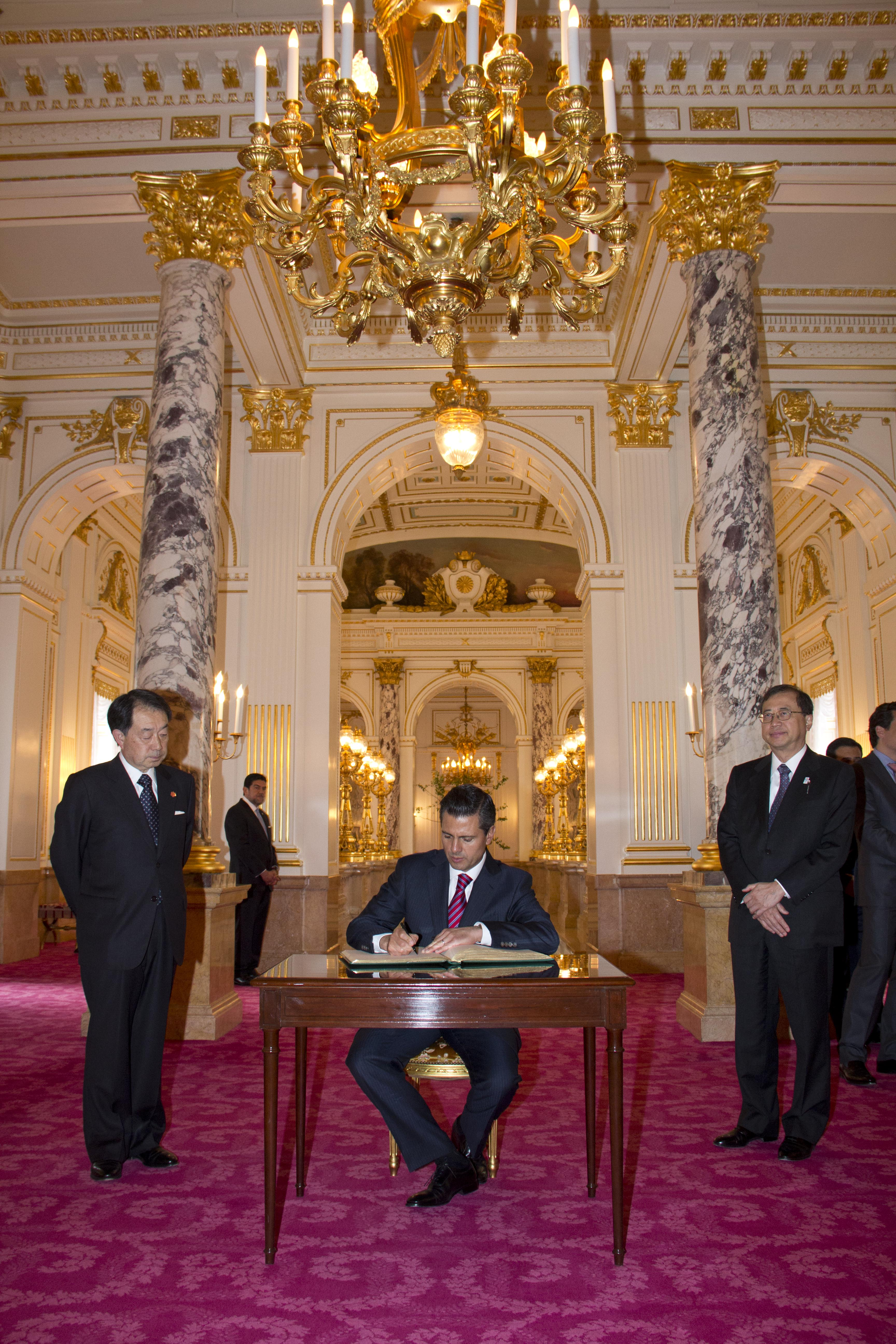
President Peña Nieto signing the Akasaka Palace guestbook, 2013

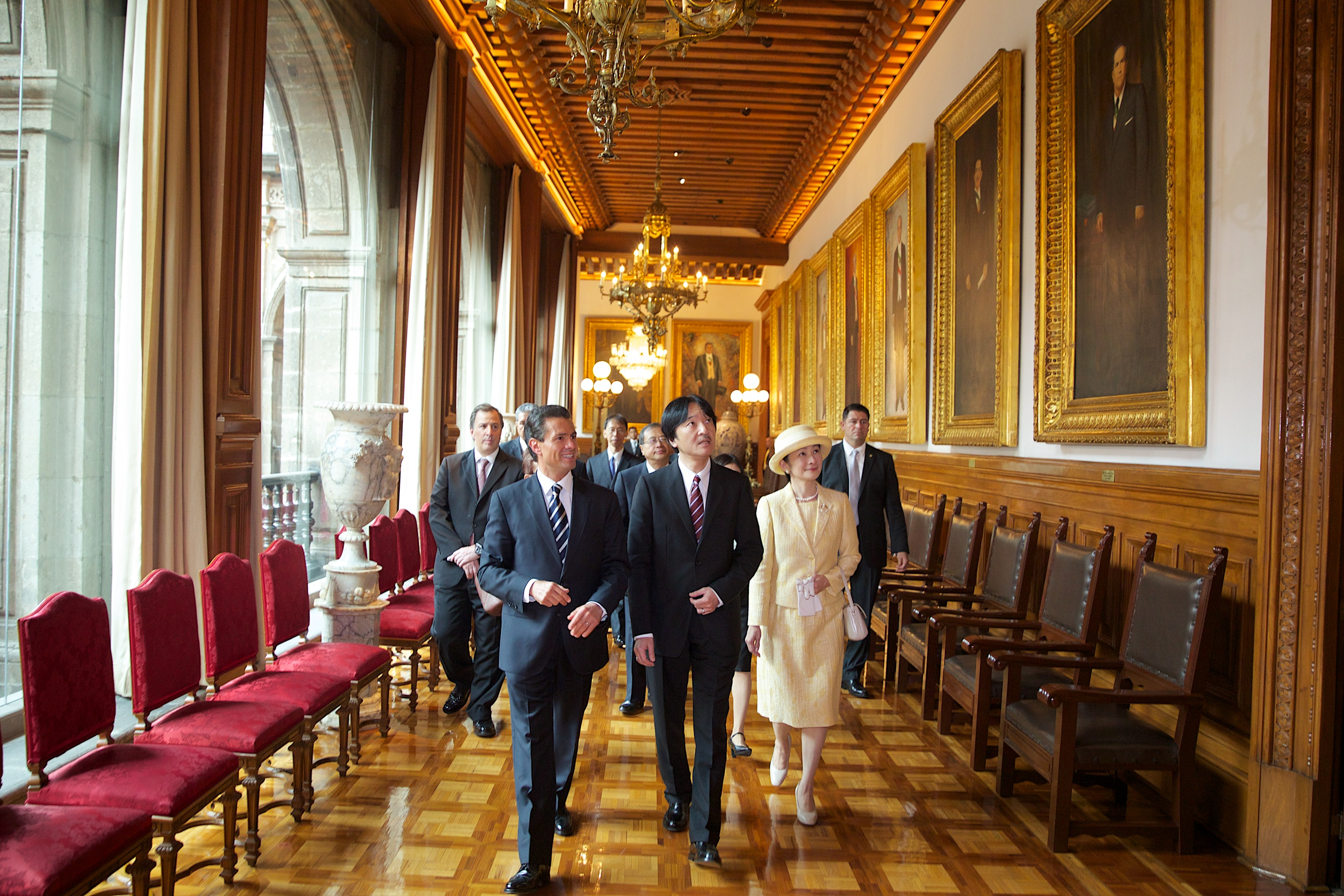
President Enrique Peña Nieto, Prince Akishino and Princess Kiko in the Palacio Nacional, Mexico City, 2014.

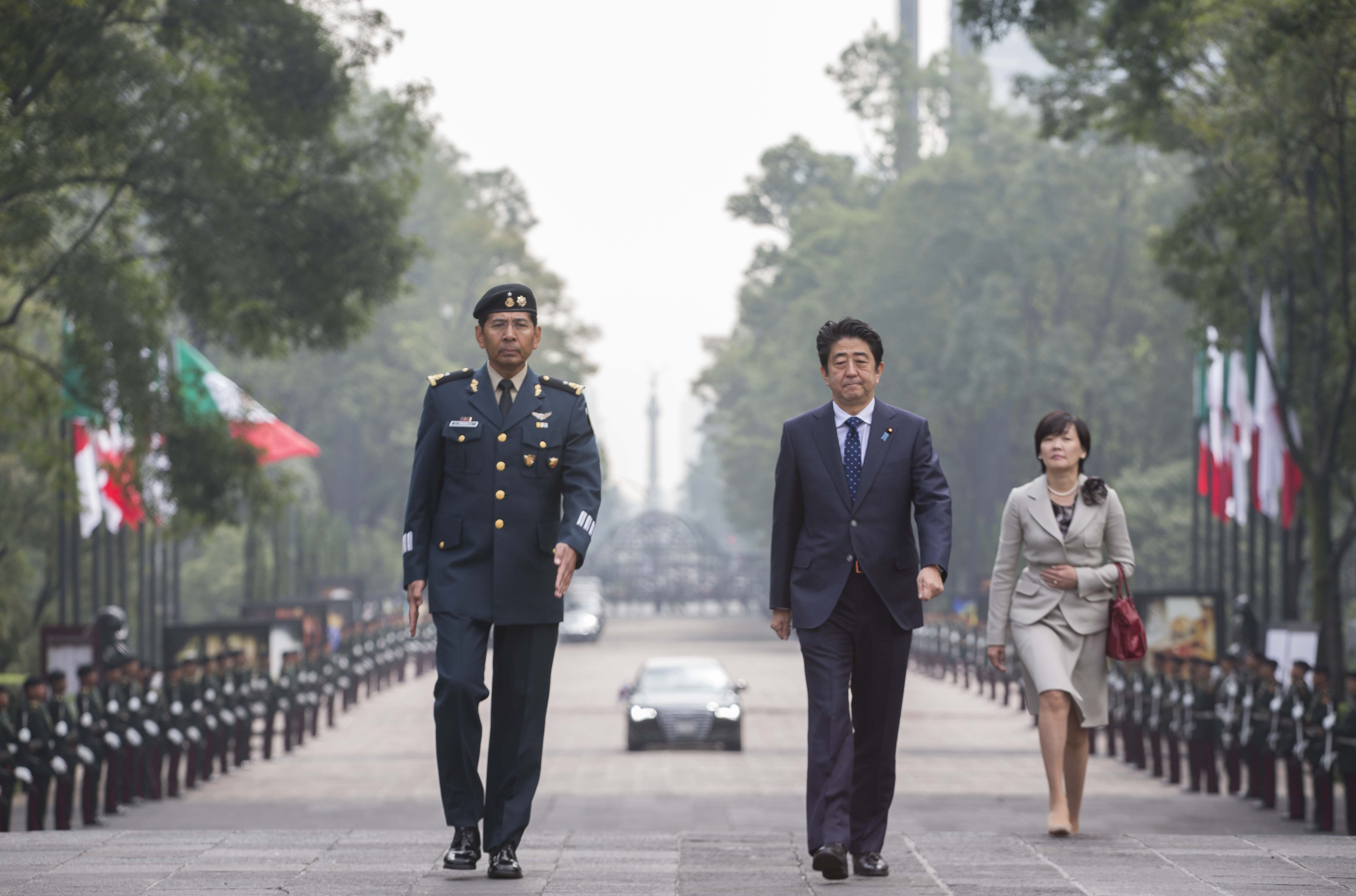
Prime Minister Shinzo Abe in Chapultepec Park, Mexico City, 2014.

== Multilateral organizations ==
Both nations are members of the Asia-Pacific Economic Cooperation, CPTPP, Forum of East Asia–Latin America Cooperation, G20 major economies, International Monetary Fund, OECD, United Nations and the World Trade Organization, among others. Japan and Mexico were also part of the Trans-Pacific Partnership.

== Bilateral agreements ==
Both nations have been several bilateral agreements signed between both nations such as a Treaty of Friendship, Trade and Navigation (1888); Cultural Agreement (1959); Agreement on Air Transportation (1972); Agreement on Technical Cooperation (1986); Agreement to Avoid Double Taxation and Prevent Fiscal Evasion with respect to Income Taxes (1996); Agreement to Strengthen and Implement the Economic Association (2004); and an Agreement on Mutual Assistance and Cooperation in Customs Affairs (2017).

== Cinema and culture ==
Toshiro Mifune starred in the Mexican film Ánimas Trujano. To prepare for his role, Mifune studied tapes of Mexican actors speaking so that he could recite all of his lines in Spanish. When asked why he chose Mexico to act for his next movie, Mifune quoted, “Simply because, first of all, Mr. Ismael Rodríguez convinced me; secondly, because I was eager to work in beautiful Mexico, of great tradition; and thirdly, because the story and character of 'Animas Trujano' seemed very human to me”. The film was nominated for both a Golden Globe and an Oscar. Interestingly, Mifune gave a Japanese pistol to then-Mexican president Adolfo López Mateos when they met in Oaxaca.

Japanese cultural imports such as anime, video games, food, films, music (J-pop) have had a significant impact in Mexico. Japanese gardens are also found in several cities in Mexico, including the Parque Masayoshi Ohira in Mexico City. There is also a Little Tokyo in Mexico City.

The same can be true for Mexican cultural imports in Japan. In Nagoya, there is a Mexico Square within Hisaya Ōdori Park.

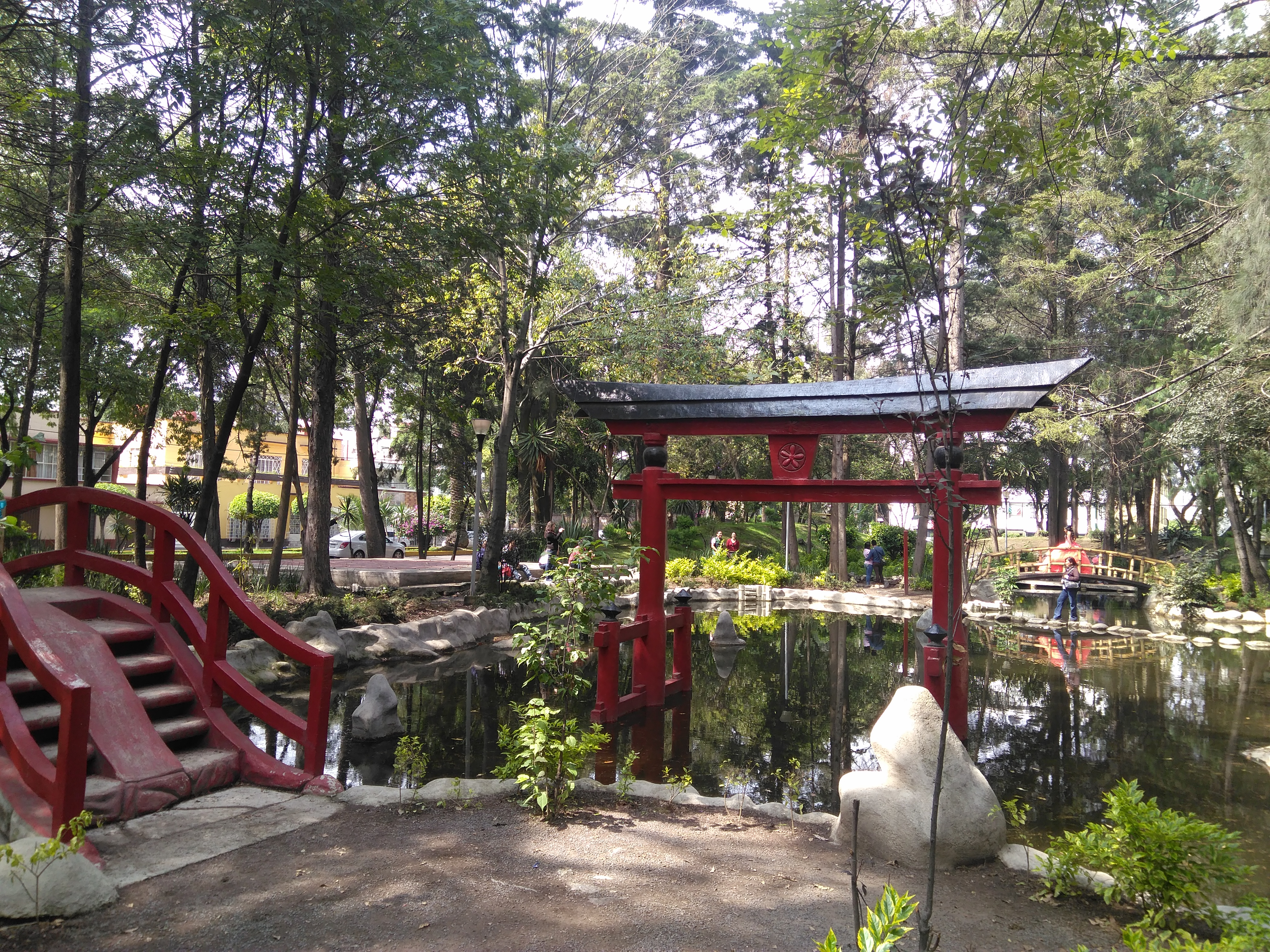
A Torii in Parque Masayoshi Ohira, Mexico City.

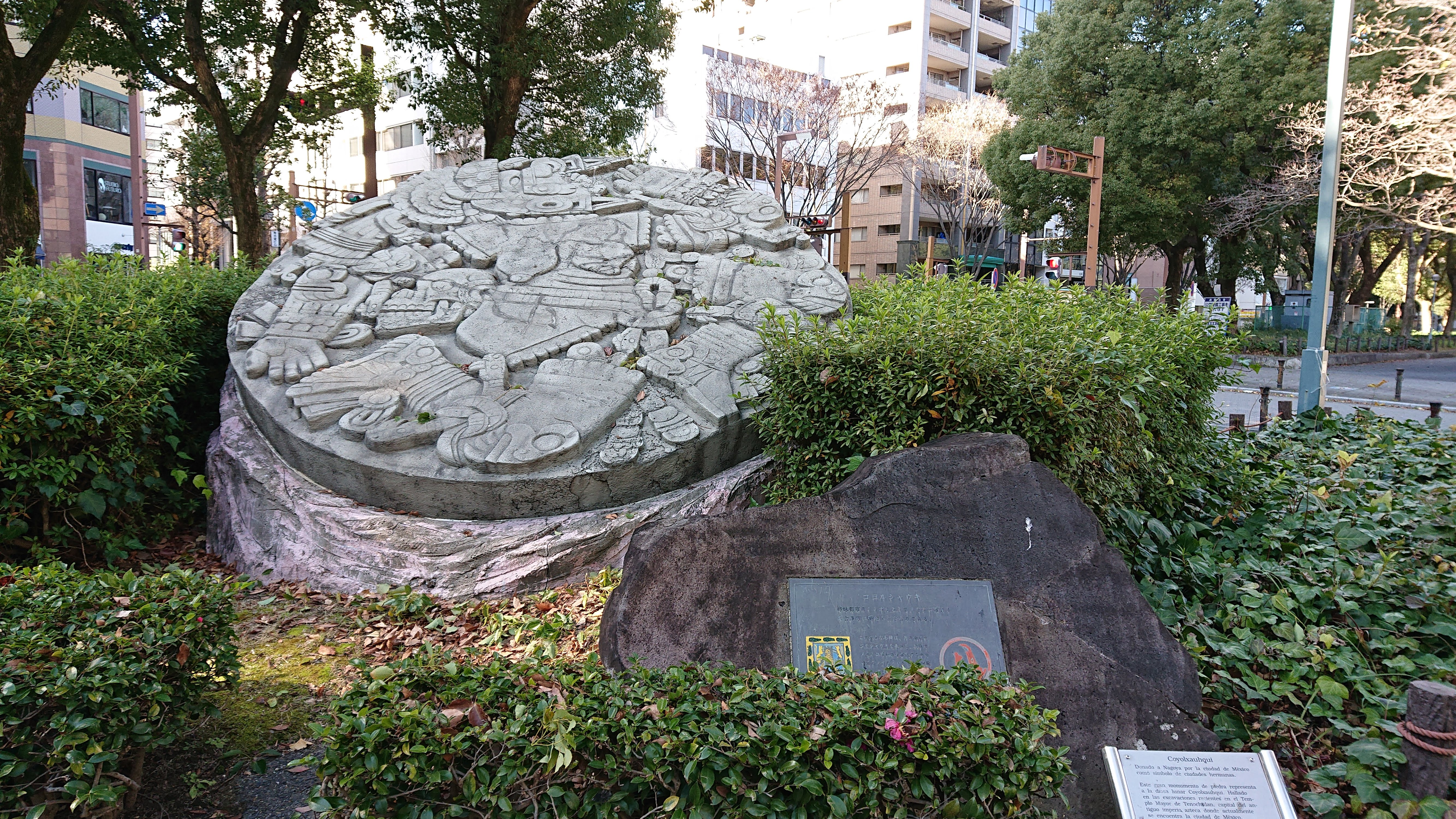
Replica of the Coyolxāuhqui stone disk in Mexico Square at Hisaya Ōdori Park, Nagoya.

== Education ==
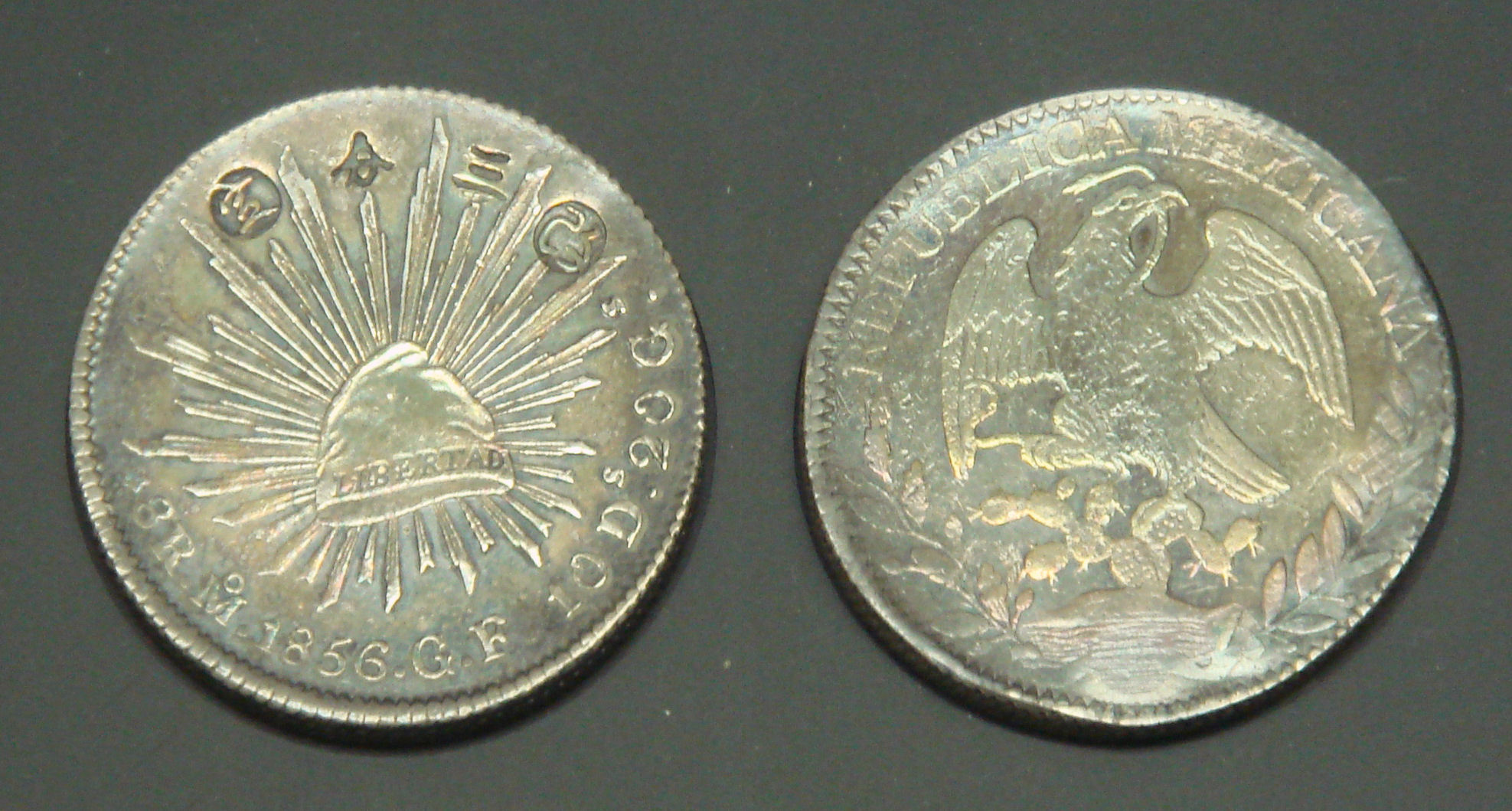
A Mexican dollar used as currency in Japan, marked with "Aratame sanbu sadame" (改三分定, fixed to the value of 3 bu).

The Liceo Mexicano Japonés, a Japanese-Mexican school, serves elementary through high school students, including Mexican and Japanese nationals, residing in Mexico City.

== Transportation ==
There are nonstop flights between Japan and Mexico with Aeroméxico and All Nippon Airways.

== Trade ==
In April 2005, Japan and Mexico signed a free trade agreement (a.k.a. Agreement Between Japan and the United Mexican States for the Strengthening of the Economic Partnership). Both nations are also signatories to the Trans-Pacific Partnership. As a result, trade between the two nations has increased dramatically. In 2023, trade between the two nations amounted to US$24.4 billion. Japan's main exports to Mexico include: electronics, motor vehicles, rolled products of iron steel or non-alloy steel, tubes and pipes, medical equipment, video gaming consoles, and plastic. Mexico's main exports to Japan include: electrical equipment, telephones and mobile phones, copper ore and other minerals, silver, parts and accessories for motor vehicles, steel, iron chemical based products, meat, fruits and alcohol.

There are approximately 1,168 Japanese companies operating in Mexico. Japanese multinational companies such as Bridgestone, Mazda, Hitachi, Honda, Kyocera, Mitsubishi, Nippon Express, Nissan, Sojitz, Sony, Toyota and Toyota Tsusho (among others) operate in Mexico. Mexican multinational companies such as Grupo Altex, KidZania, Orbia, Proeza, San Luis Rassini and Sukarne (among others) operate in Japan.

== Resident diplomatic missions ==
of Japan in Mexico

- Mexico City (Embassy)
- León (Consulate-General)

of Mexico in Japan

- Tokyo (Embassy)

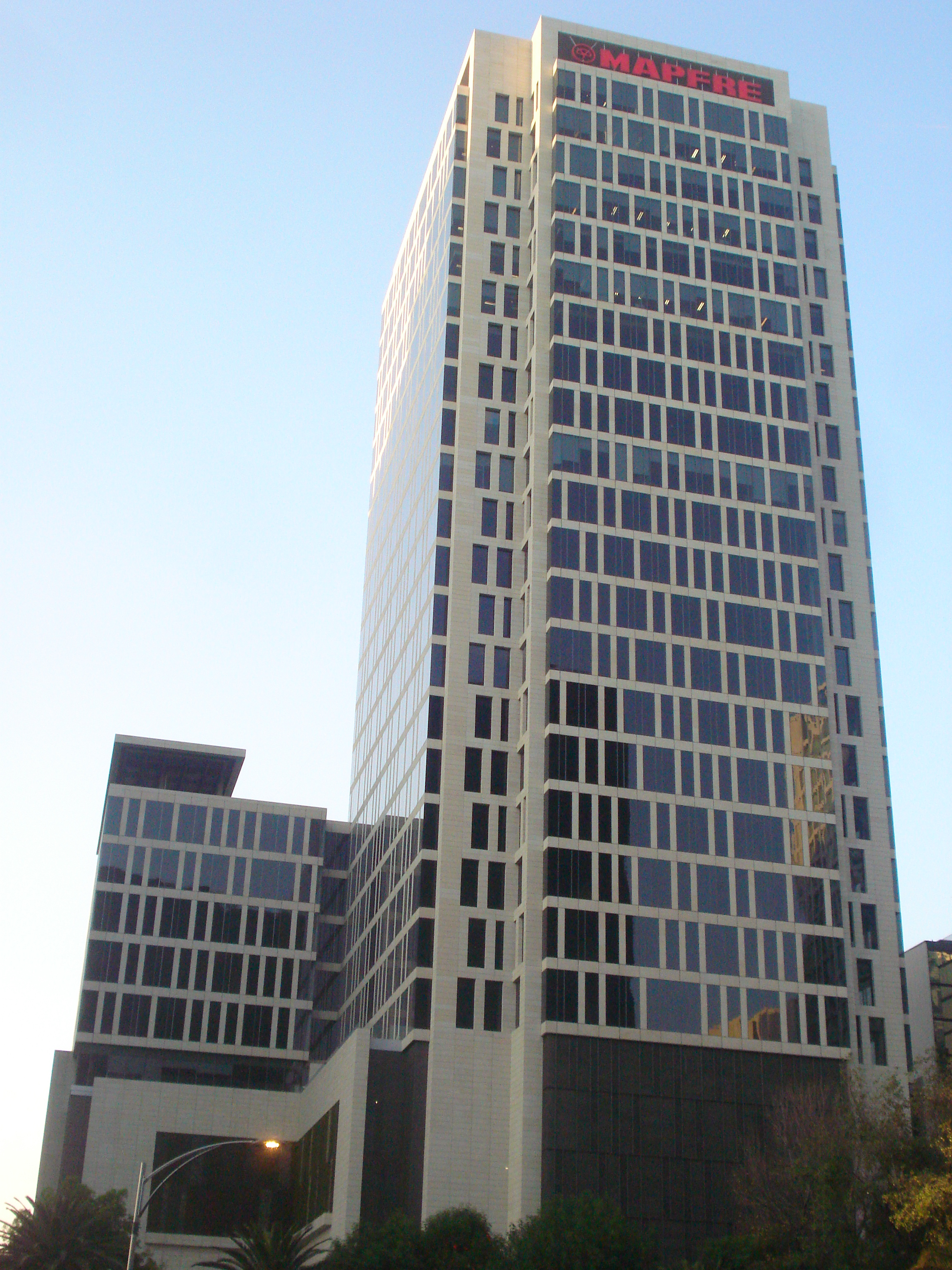
Torre MAPFRE hosting the Embassy of Japan in Mexico City

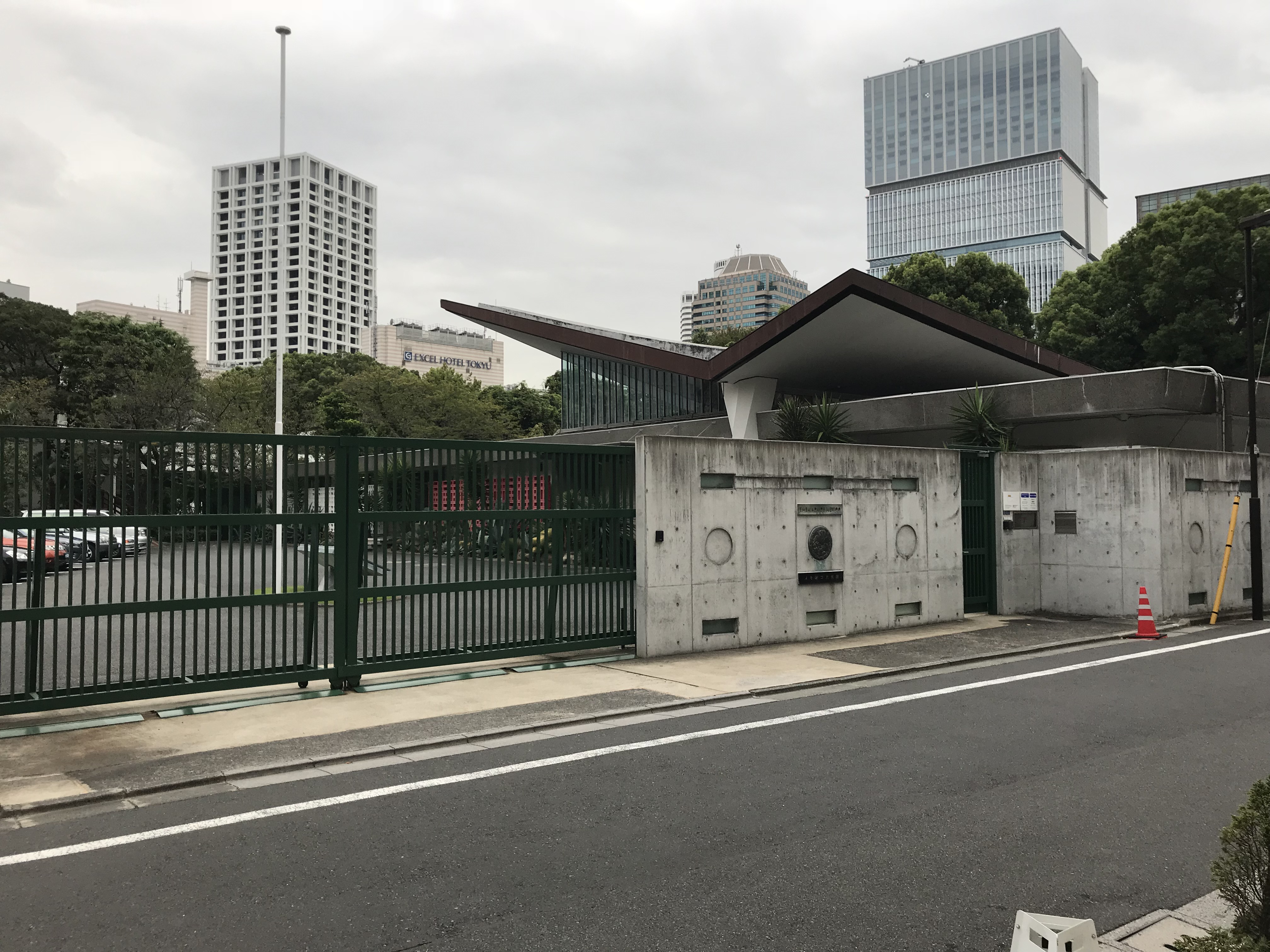
Embassy of Mexico in Tokyo

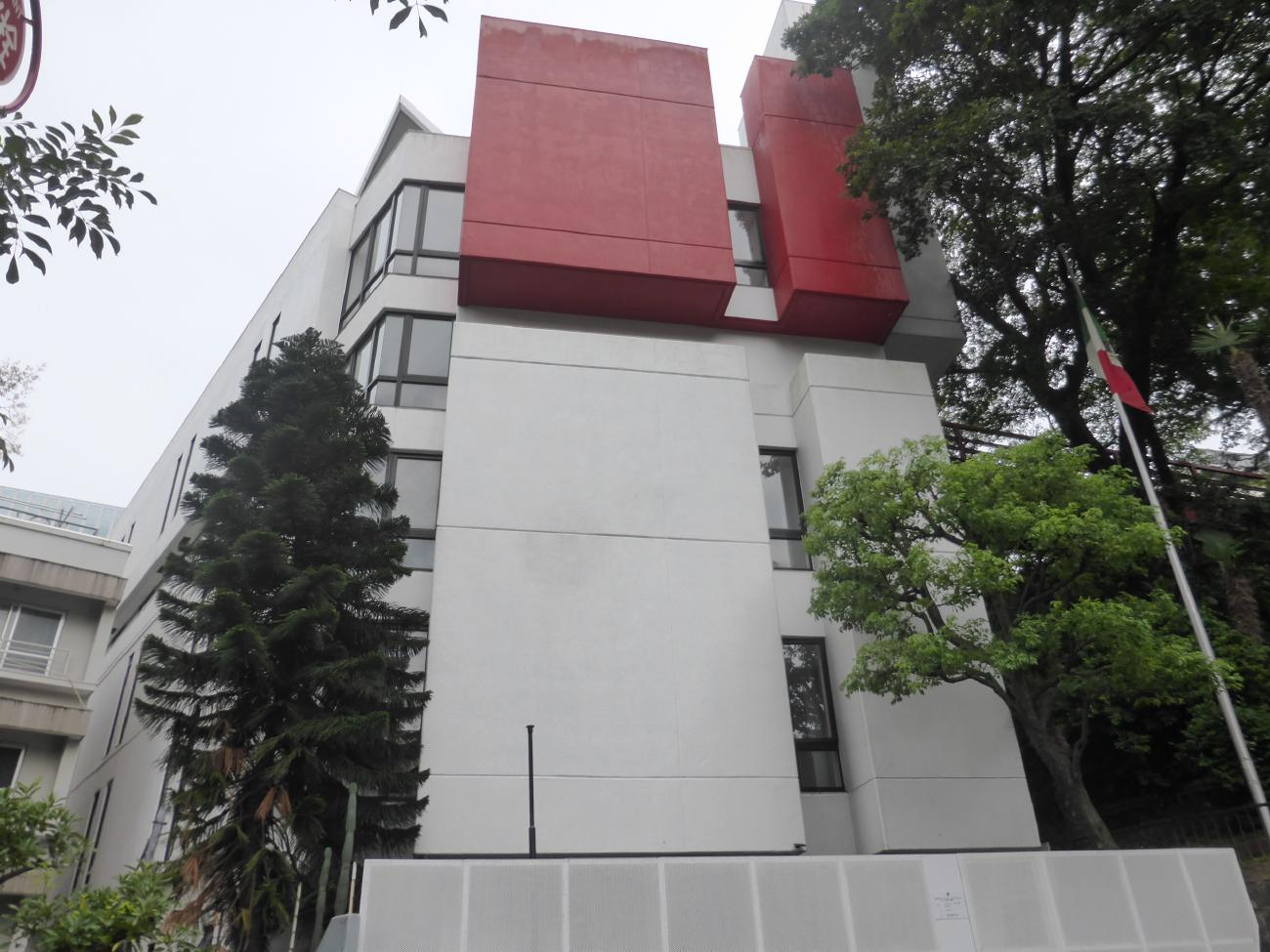
Consular Section of the Embassy of Mexico in Tokyo

== Gallery ==
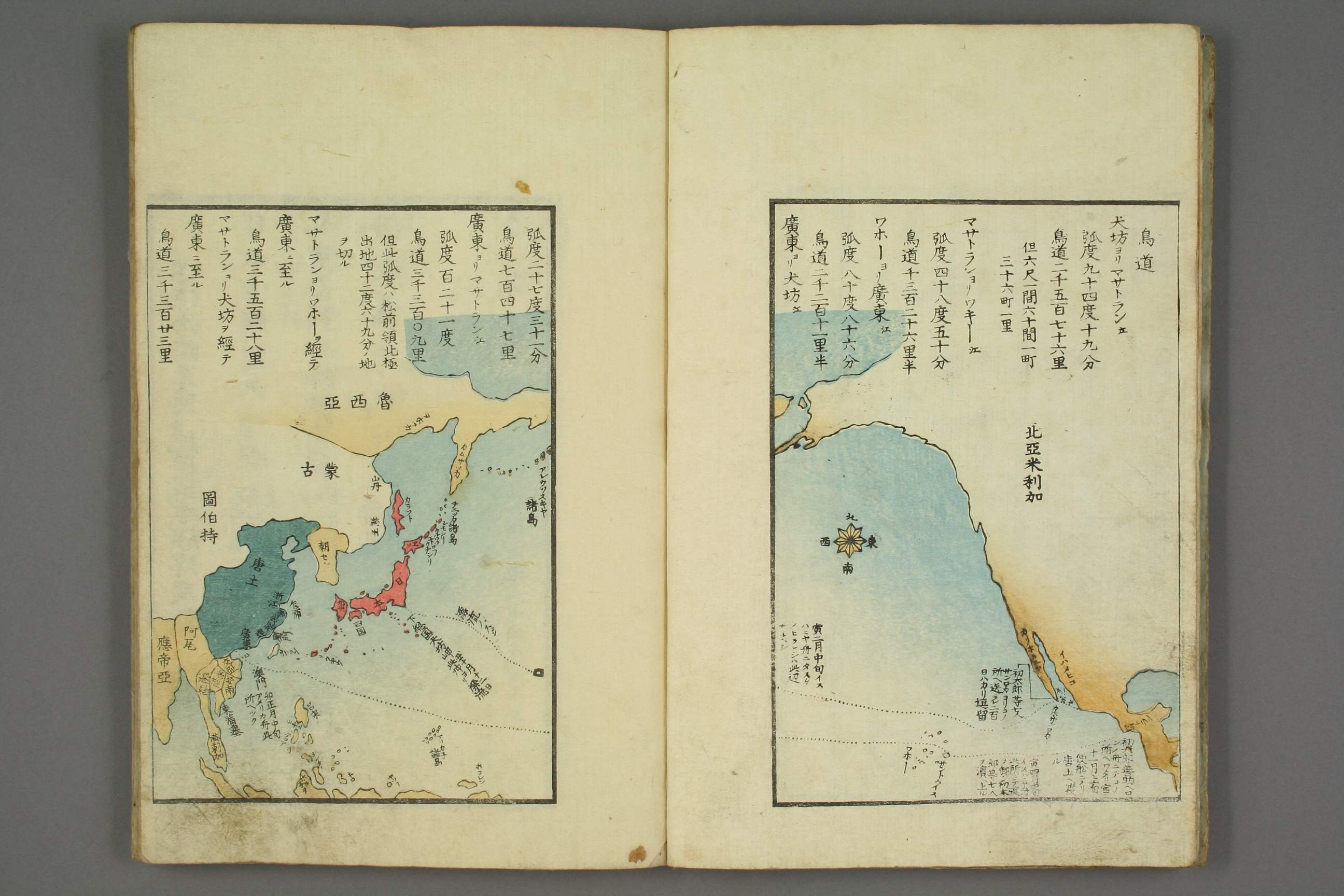
The route taken by the shipwreck survivors from Japan to Mexico

Japanese painting of the Mexican Port city of Mazatlán

A Torii at the "Mexico-Japan Friendship Park" in Mexico City

Monument in Uraga, Japan marking the site of historic trade relations with Mexico and Spain

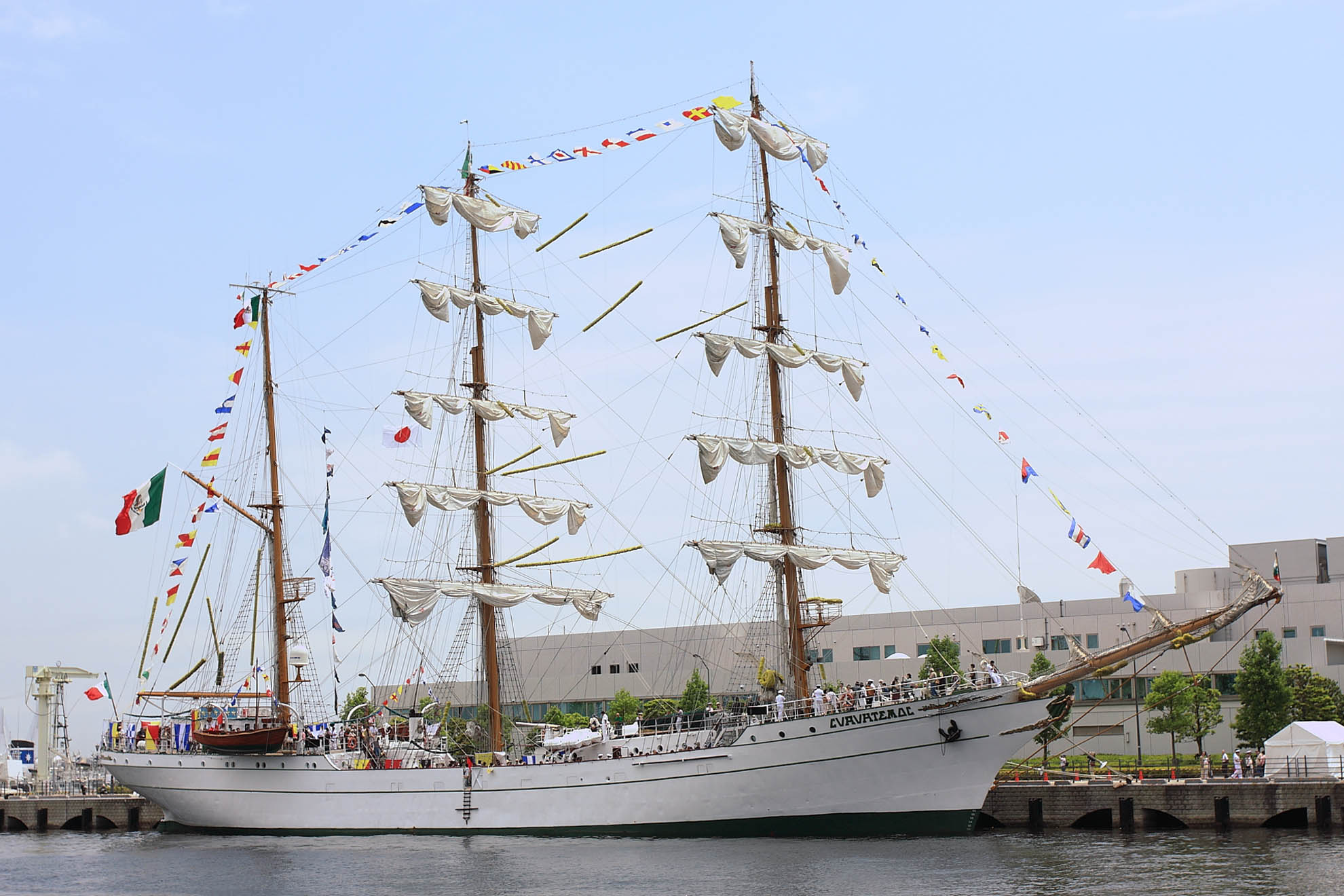
Mexican Naval training vessel, the ARM Cuauhtémoc, in Yokohama

Flags of Mexico and Japan at the National Palace in Mexico City

Japan-Mexico Goodwill Military Exercise

== See also ==
- Japanese community of Mexico City
- Japanese Mexicans
- Mexicans in Japan
