= Rodrigo de Vivero, 1st Count of Valle de Orizaba =

Spanish noble

Rodrigo de Vivero y Aberrucia

13th Governor-General of the Philippines
- In office June 15, 1608 – April 1609
- Monarch: Philip III of Spain
- Governor: (Viceroy of New Spain); Luis de Velasco, 1st Marquess of Salinas
- Preceded by: Cristóbal Téllez Almazán
- Succeeded by: Juan de Silva

Personal details
- Born: Rodrigo de Vivero y Aberrucia; 1564; Tecamachalco, New Spain (now Puebla, Mexico)
- Died: 1636 (aged 71–72)

Rodrigo de Vivero y Aberrucia, 1st Count of Valle de Orizaba (Spanish: Rodrigo de Vivero y Aberrucia, primer conde del valle de Orizaba) (Tecamachalco?, New Spain, 1564–1636) was a Spanish noble who served as the 13th governor and captain-general of the Philippines from 1608 to 1609. He was the son of Rodrigo de Vivero y Velasco, a Spanish colonial officer who was the nephew of Viceroy of New Spain Luis de Velasco, and Melchora de Aberrucia, a widow of conquistador Alonso Valiente.

== Governorship ==
He became the interim governor of the Philippines from June 15, 1608 to April 1609.

While in Manila, Rodrigo de Vivero y Aberrucia was confronted with the insurrection of the Japanese enclaves in the Philippines, especially Dilao. He deported some of the Japanese back to Japan and implemented trade control. Soon after however, he received messages from William Adams on behalf of Tokugawa Ieyasu, who wished to establish direct trade contacts with New Spain. Friendly letters were exchanged, officially starting relations between Japan and New Spain.

His term as governor of the Philippines ended at Easter, 1609. Thereafter he was appointed count of Valle, and governor, captain-general, and president of the Audiencia of Panama.

== Japan ==
On 30 September 1609, on his way back to New Spain, Rodrigo's ship, the San Francisco became shipwrecked in Japan with a crew of 373, near Iwawada in Kazusa Province (today Onjuku, Chiba). Of the two other ships which accompanied Rodrigo, the Santa Ana rallied to another Japanese harbour safely, but the other, San Antonio, disappeared. Rodrigo de Vivero y Aberrucia spent 9 months in Japan and met extensively with authorities, with the help of Luis Sotelo.

He left Japan on board a ship built by William Adams, the San Buena Ventura in August 1610. He could have left on the Santa Ana, but wished to accompany the Japanese so that they could be welcome without trouble in New Spain. He was accompanied by 23 Japanese representatives on his way back, led by the Kyoto trader Tanaka Shōsuke (田中勝助). They became the first Japanese recorded to cross the Pacific.

They were also accompanied by the Franciscan Father Alonso Muños, who was the official envoy of Tokugawa Ieyasu to negotiate trade with the Spanish authorities. The Shogun also lent them the equivalent of 4,000 ducados for the trip.

During his stay, Rodrigo established a treaty with the Japanese, offering extraterritorial privileges for a Spanish shipyard and a naval base in eastern Japan in exchange for transpacific trade and Mexican silver mining technology. Rodrigo also requested the mapping of Japanese coasts, freedom for the activities of Catholic priests and the expulsion of the Dutch.

Luis de Velasco, the viceroy of Nueva España, received the 23 Japanese and expressed his great satisfaction at the treatment the Spanish sailors had received in Japan. He decided to send an embassy to Japan in the person of the famous explorer Sebastián Vizcaíno.

Rodrigo once had an audience with Tokugawa Ieyasu.

Vizcaíno also had a mission to return the 4,000 ducados and to research "gold and silver islands" supposedly to the east of Japan. He left for Japan on 22 March 1611, and after another shipwreck would eventually return in 1613 on board the Japanese-built galleon San Juan Bautista with the first official Japanese embassy to the Americas and Europe, led by Hasekura Tsunenaga.

Political offices
Preceded by Pedro Bravo de Acuña	Spanish Governor-General of the Philippines; 1608–1609	Succeeded by Juan de Silva
