= Alonso Valiente =

Spanish conquistador

Alonso Valiente (1482? in Medina de las Torres – 1564? in New Spain) was a Spanish conquistador. He was Hernán Cortés' cousin and secretary. He was one of the first governors (Alguacil Mayor) of Mexico City. He was also the first encomendero of Tecamachalco, and he contributed to found Puebla de los Ángeles, where he also served as mayor.

== Conqueror ==
Alonso Valiente first traveled to the New World with Cristóbal Colón's (Christopher Columbus') last expedition to the continent. He arrived in Santo Domingo in 1508 with Don Diego Colón. Valiente was one of the conquerors of Higüey in today's Dominican Republic and Borinquen (named by Cristóbal Colón San Juan Bautista) in what is now known as Puerto Rico He remained there from 1509 to 1521. He, his household, and sixty Spaniards he provisioned, arrived in Mexico City, only four months after the Spanish capture of the city. Valiente participated in the conquest of Michoacán and Pánuco. In 1524 he was also a part of Cortés' expedition to Las Hibueras in today's Honduras. This is evident in the appointment of Bernal Díaz as a captain, a document that was signed by Alonso Valiente. There, Valiente helped to conquer the three islands of Guanaja, in the coast of North Honduras. The inhabitants of these islands told that the crew of a vessel coming from today's Cuba had captured and enslaved more than sixty people. Probably being faithful to the Laws of Burgos, Cortés then ordered Valiente and others to go and rescue these people. He gave him a brigantine and the best artillery that was available. Valiente's expedition did not manage to capture the slavers. However, they learned that the ship was originally sent from Santo Domingo with other purposes, but the captain changed plans during the mission, realizing that he could capture slaves and make a profit. Alonso Valiente is also one of the discoverers of the Old Bahama Channel. Valiente also participated in the conquest of Chametla in Nueva Galicia.

Valiente held a number of appointive offices in addition to acting as secretary to his relative Hernán Cortés. His service is recounted in his coat of arms citation of 26 November 1547. In the 1520s Valiente was considered a vecino of both Medellin (Spain), Veracruz and Mexico City simultaneously. By 1547 he was a citizen of both Mexico City and Puebla, which he contributed to found.

== Family and life in the New World ==
Valiente arrived in Mexico with his first wife, Juana de Mancilla. Sources indicate that Valiente did not get a new wife until around 1555. However, there is no record about Mancilla's death or any other form of dissolution of the marriage. She is thought to have died during the 1550s.

Juana de Mancilla is remembered from accounts of her punishment in Mexico City, when she was suspected of sorcery. This suspicion arose when she was urged to marry another man by the colonial factor, fearing that Valiente and all of the participants in one of Cortés' expeditions had died. But Mancilla claimed to be certain that Valiente and everyone in the expedition were alive. Therefore, she remained faithful to Valiente. Because of that, the factor ordered to whip her, having interpreted her faith as sorcery. Later, the colonial factor got news which certified that Valiente, and all of the other conquerors were indeed alive. When the factor understood that he had made a mistake, he issued an apology and decided to ask every gentleman in the colony to ride their horses in the streets, to honor Juana de Mancilla. From then on, she was known as Doña Señora Juana de Mancilla.

Cortés granted Valiente the encomienda of Tecamachalco in 1523. This property was valued in 3.300 pesos in 1560. Valiente lived in Mexico City from 1526 to 1542. In 1527 he was also registered as a resident of Medellin (Spain). He was the attorney of the conquerors Luis Ponce the León and Alonso de Ávila. He was also a resident and the mayor of Puebla from 1542 to 1555. He is also known to have owned land in Oaxtepec.

Valiente built houses near the Concepción Convent in New Spain. These houses were owned by Francisco de Peralta in 1558. This year, Alonso Valiente was also referred to the Holy Inquisition for having said that mere fornication was not a mortal sin.

He was present in the marriage of Juan Jaramillo and Doña Marina and was a witness in the marriage of María Jaramillo and Luis de Quesada in 1546.

Together with Juan Altamirano, Alonso Valiente stayed in Mexico during Cortés' first trip to Spain. Both Altamirano and Valiente functioned as Hernán Cortés' legal representatives during his absence from Mexico.

Alonso Valiente had a second wife named Melchora de Aberrucia, with whom he had no children. He lived with her in what is now the city of Puebla, becoming one of the city's founders and first governors.

== Popular culture ==
Alonso Valiente is also known to have purchased a slave, who was baptized and received the Christian name of Juan Valiente. The slave had originally been acquired by the Portuguese in Northwestern Africa. Alonso took Juan to Spain and eventually allowed him to travel to South America, so that he could also try his chances as a conqueror. Juan Valiente first travelled to Perú from Guatemala, with Pedro de Alvarado. He then joined Pedro de Almagro's company and finally Pedro de Valdivia. Juan Valiente contributed to establish Santiago, Chile. He is thus known in popular culture as one of the few African conquerors in the New World. Juan Valiente lived as a free man in Chile. He never got to pay for his freedom, although he tried to do so. Alonso Valiente insisted in recovering the money, but it became virtually impossible for Juan Valiente to dispatch the payments to New Spain. Juan Valiente finally died in Tucapel, Chile in 1553.

Alonso Valiente is also known for having been the first owner of La Casa del Conde (the count's house) in one of his encomiendas in Tecamachalco. Upon Alonso Valiente's death, the house was taken over by Valiente's widow and second wife, Melchora de Aberrucia. She remarried with Rodrigo de Vivero y Velasco, a relative of Luís de Velasco, the second Viceroy of New Spain. Their son, Rodrigo de Vivero y Aberrucia, became the first Count of the Valley of Orizaba. Since then, the house has been popularly known as La Casa del Conde (the count's house).

The Spanish comic book series of 1957 Capitán Valiente (the brave captain), illustrated by Manuel Gago García, with dialogues by Pedro Quesada, was loosely based on Alonso Valiente's character.
