= Margaret Zoila Dominguez =

Margaret Zoila Dominguez is a Mexican optical engineer at the National Aeronautics and Space Administration (NASA). She is known for collaborating on the Nancy Grace Telescope at NASA'S Goddard Space Flight Center. She does educational outreach primarily at elementary and middle schools teaching about optics. She advocates on recruiting minorities and Hispanics to be future scientists and engineers.

== Early life and education ==
Domínguez was born in Tecamachalco, Mexico. Her family raised farm animals from rabbits to cows. Dominguez is the oldest sibling of four. She graduated from University of the Americas Puebla (UDLAP) with a Bachelor's (B.S) in Physics. She also earned her Master's (M.S) (2014) and Doctor of Philosophy (PhD) (2019) at University of Arizona in Optical Sciences.

== Career and research ==
In 2008, while still attending UDLAP, Dominguez helped organize a physics conference. Johnathan Gardner, a NASA astrophysicist, was invited as a speaker to the conference. Gardner offered Dominguez a summer internship at NASA. In Spring of 2008, she applied for the summer internship and was accepted in the optics branch at Goddard Space Flight Center in Maryland as an optical engineer. While working at Goddard, her boss Ray Ohl, suggested to apply to University of Arizona for optical sciences where Dominguez was given a full fellowship for her degrees while working at NASA.

In 2014, she became a full-time employee for NASA working in the same department. During her time at NASA, she worked on the Hubble and James Webb Telescopes. The James Webb is one of the largest telescopes in space, being the size of a tennis court. In 2019, Dominguez's research on techniques used to analyze optical systems such as the ones she worked with at NASA was issued as part of her PhD program at the University of Arizona. As of 2021, she is currently working on a component for the Roman Space Telescope, which is named after a woman astronomer, Nancy Grace Roman. This is the first telescope to be named after a woman. This project will help seek out human life on other planets by means chemical detection and provide information on how dark mass and energy influence the ongoing expansion of the universe.

At National Institute of Standards and Technology (NIST), Dominguez is a research associate and collaborates at their Center for Nanoscale Science and Technology (CNST) in Maryland campus. She is also a member of the International Society for Optics and Photonics (SPIE) as part of the Education and Outreach Committee. As of 2025 she recently had worked on a Roman Space Telescope, where she test multiple things like distance and lead of grating prism component. This is planned to launch in 2027.

== Recognition ==
Among her accomplishments, in 2021 Dr. Margaret Dominguez won NASA’s esteemed award for Diversity, Equity, Inclusion and Accessibility award. She was also the ambassador for OPTICA, which are qualified individuals with an interest in optics and photonics.

In 2022, Dominguez was recognized by local congressman, Sergio Salomon Cespedes Peregina, a native of Tecamachalco, for her contributions for NASA and serving as a representative of Mexico. Dominguez is also a TED talker and she is part of Latin group TECHNOLOchicas and SciGirls.
