= Cristóbal Téllez Almazán =

12th Governor-General of the Philippines
- In office June 24, 1606 – June 15, 1608
- Monarch: Philip III of Spain
- Governor: (Viceroy of New Spain); Juan de Mendoza y Luna, Marquis of Montesclaros; Luis de Velasco, 1st Marquess of Salinas
- Preceded by: Pedro Bravo de Acuña
- Succeeded by: Rodrigo de Vivero y Aberrucia

Personal details
- Born: Spain
- Died: 1612 Manila

Cristóbal Téllez Almazán was an auditor licentiate taking over military affairs before becoming the 12th governor of the Philippines under Spanish colonial rule. He is the first governor-general of the Philippines from the Real Audiencia of Manila. A series of Japanese insurrections began just last year, 1606, when a son of a Japanese was killed by a Spaniard. The Japanese then plotted a revolt. A second Japanese insurrection occurred in 1607.

Preceded by Pedro Bravo de Acuña	Spanish Governor - Captain General of the Philippines; 1606–1608	Succeeded by Rodrigo de Vivero y Velasco
