= Mexicans in Japan =

在日メキシコ人 (Japanese) Mexicanos en Japón (Spanish)
- (Mexico) (Japan)

Total population
- 3,954 (December 2025)

Regions with significant populations
- Tokyo, Osaka, Kobe, Okinawa

Languages
- Spanish, Japanese

Religion
- Catholicism, Shintoism, Buddhism

Related ethnic groups
- Mexican Americans, Mexicans in the Philippines

Mexicans in Japan consist of Mexican migrants that have come to Japan, as well as their descendants. In December 2025, there were 3,954 Mexicans living in Japan.

== History ==
At the beginning of the 20th century there were large Japanese and Mexican communities in Los Angeles and other parts of California where their encounters began. There were also marriages between Japanese and Mexicans, and some had left California for Japan at the time of World War II. The first larger Mexican migration to Japan began in the 1970s when there was large migration from the United States to Japan. Many Mexicans who lived in the U.S. chose to move to Japan.

Since the 21st century, Mexican culture gained larger popularity in Japan and there are increasing numbers of Mexican restaurants in Japan, which mostly serve burritos and tacos. Many Mexican festivals including the Day of the Dead were held in Japan organised by Mexican communities. Mexicans are also the largest Latin American community excluding the population with Japanese ancestries and the fourth largest Spanish-speaking community after Peru, Bolivia and Spain. The Mexican population in Japan is currently increasing due to the better visa policy and direct flight connections between Tokyo and Mexico City. There were also a few Mexican individuals with American citizenship, who work for the USFJ.

== See also ==
- Japanese Mexicans
- Japan–Mexico relations
