= Pedro Bravo de Acuña =

Spanish military officer (died 1606)

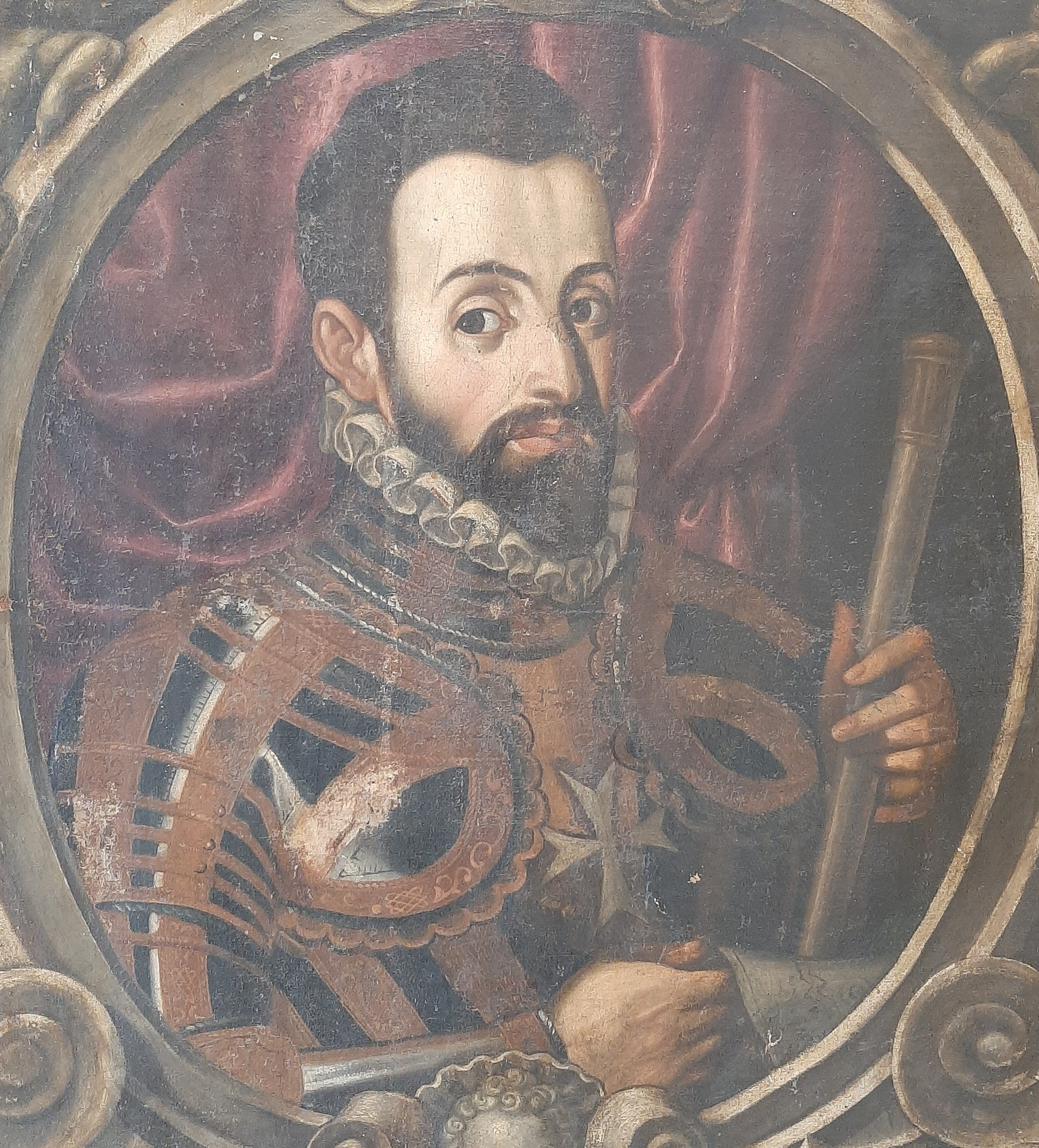

11th Governor-General of the Philippines
- In office May 1602 – June 24, 1606
- Monarch: Philip III of Spain
- Governor: (Viceroy of New Spain); Gaspar de Zúñiga, 5th Count of Monterrey; Juan de Mendoza y Luna, Marquis of Montesclaros
- Preceded by: Francisco de Tello de Guzmán
- Succeeded by: Cristóbal Téllez Almazán

Personal details
- Died: June 24, 1606

Pedro Bravo de Acuña (died June 24, 1606) was a Spanish military officer and colonial official in the Spanish Americas and the Philippines. From 1602 to 1606, he was the eleventh Governor-General of the Philippines.

== Early career and arrival in the Philippines ==
Bravo de Acuña was recognized for his bravery in the Battle of Lepanto.

As the senior military officer present, Pedro was in charge of defending Cádiz in the 1587 Battle of Cádiz.

He became a knight of the Order of Saint John, and was named governor of Cartagena de Indias in Tierra Firme on the Caribbean coast in 1593. In 1601 he was named Governor of the Philippines.

In May 1602, he arrived in Manila via convoy of four ships from New Spain, to take up the governorship and presidency of the Audiencia of Manila.

Francisco de Tello de Guzmán, his predecessor, was awaiting his juicio de residencia (grievance tribunal), and for such reason remained in Manila. He died of an illness the following year, in April.

Bravo de Acuña promptly began to construct galleys and other vessels in the shipyard, to defend the sea, which was full of enemies and pirates from other islands, especially from Mindanao. He was much preoccupied with settling matters with the Empire of Japan and with the Sultanate of Sulu, in addition he also had to see that the ships were robust enough to make the voyage to New Spain.

== Relations with Japan ==
A few days after his arrival in Manila, Bravo de Acuña received Chiquiro, an envoy from the shōgun Tokugawa Ieyasu (Daifu Sama, as he was known to the Spanish), ruler of Japan. Ieyasu wanted to establish trade and friendship with New Spain, and asked for masters and workmen to be sent to Japan to build ships for that purpose and for a navy. Earlier, Viceroy Tello had sent Fray Gerónimo de Jesús, a Franciscan, to negotiate a trade and friendship treaty with Ieyasu, and Gerónimo had apparently promised Spanish help with these projects. Viceroy Bravo, however, was opposed. To begin with, the greatest security of the Philippines from Japanese attack had been their lack of ships and their ignorance of navigation. As often as the latter had intended to attack Manila, they had been prevented by this obstacle. Secondly, the Philippines had a monopoly on trade between Asia and New Spain (and beyond that, to Spain). The economy of the occupiers was based largely on this trade, and Bravo was not anxious to share it with Japan.

Fray Gerónimo was written and instructed to tell Ieyasu with what pleasure the governor had received the good-will that he manifested to him, and the peace and friendship with the Spaniards, and all the other things that he was doing for them; and that he, the governor, would keep it and observe it insofar as he was concerned, and that every year he would send a Spanish ship to trade at Quanto according to Ieyasu’s plan, and he would despatch it quickly. As to the navigation which the latter wished to undertake to Nueva España and his desire to have masters sent him for that purpose, to build ships for that voyage, that was a matter which — although the governor would do his best to effect, and to please him in everything — was not within his control, without first informing His Majesty and the latter's viceroy in Nueva España thereof; for he, the governor, had no power or authority outside of the affairs of his government of the Philippines.

Bravo promised that he would write to the king immediately, and hoped that there matter would be properly settled there. Until the reply came from Spain, which would necessarily take three years because that country was so far, he begged the shōgun to be patient, since nothing else could be done. The ship carrying Chiquiro back to Japan, however, was wrecked on Hermosa Island, and the vessel, the messenger and the message were lost.

Letters had also been received from Fray Gerónimo, reporting that Ieyasu had agreed to permit Christian missionaries and churches in Japan. Franciscans, Dominicans and Augustinians all set out hastily for the country.

In 1600, a fleet from Satsuma raided a Chinese trading fleet, stole all its merchandise and attempted to sell it at the port in Manila. Spanish authorities crucified all 400 of the crew.

In 1602, two merchant ships sailed from the Philippines to New Spain. They were beset by storms and unable to complete the voyage, with the Santa María taking refuge in Guam for forty days before sailing back to Manila. They were able to rescue most Spaniards left there by the Santa Margarita in 1600. The other ship, the Espíritu Santo, having lost its mainmast, put into port in Japan. There they were on the point of being captured by the Japanese, who apparently intended to gain control of its cargo. Nevertheless, they managed to sail out of the harbour with a jury-rigged mainmast, leaving a few hostage crewmen and cutting a rattan cable across the harbour entrance. There was some gunfire on both sides, and a few killed.

When Ieyasu was informed of the skirmish, he ordered the hostages released, and all goods returned to the Spanish.

The promised trading ship was later sent with a cargo of red wood, deerskins, raw silk and other commodities. Fray Gerónimo made a quick visit to Manila to find out the fate of ambassador Chiquiro, and then returned with the information to Japan. The missionaries that had been allowed into the country found their reception to be much cooler than anticipated, apparently because permission was a political measure intended to obtain Spanish help with shipbuilding.

Thereafter, relations between Japan and the Philippines were essentially closed.

== Jolo and Mindanao raids ==
The Spanish had maintained a fort on Jolo, but controlled very little of the island. Upon his arrival, Governor Bravo sent some reinforcements, but the Spanish there were so worn out that even with the reinforcements, they abandoned the island, retreating to the Pintados. This emboldened the people of Jolo and nearby Mindanao to make raids on the Spanish in the Pintados and elsewhere.

The governor hastily started for the island of Panay to ascertain the state of affairs, leaving the government in Manila in charge of Licenciado Antonio de Ribera, auditor of the Audiencia. Soon afterwards raiders from Mindanao attacked Luzon, taking some Spaniards captive and holding them for ransom, and burning the town of Calilaya. After these initial successes they encountered greater resistance, and so passed over to Mindoro.

After taking more captives and booty, the raiders left Mindoro to return to Mindanao. They put into the river of a small, uninhabited island to get water and wood. Just at that time Governor Bravo, who was hastily returning to Manila after he had received news of the pirates, passed the island. He passed so near the mouth of the river, in three small boats with very few men, that it was a wonder that he was not seen and captured by the enemy. He learned that the enemy was there, and then he met with the twelve vessels sent from Manila in search of the raiders. The governor ordered the commander to make more haste and gave him some of his own men to guide him to where he had left the pirates the day before, whereupon they went to attack them. However, the sentinels of the raiders raised the alarm, and they left the river in haste, throwing into the sea goods and slaves in order to flee more lightly.

The Spanish vessels were not as fast, but sank a few boats and captured two. The others escaped over the high seas. Without accomplishing anything else, the fleet returned to Manila. The governor had already arrived there, very much disturbed that these enemies, who had never dared to leave their settlements, should have been so daring as to come to the very gates of the city, doing great damage and taking captives.

== First expedition to the Moluccas ==
Some years before this, the King of Spain had ordered an expedition be sent from Portuguese India for the capture of the fort of Terrenate in the Moluccas. (From 1580 to 1640, Spanish kings also ruled over Portugal.) Ternate was in the power of a Moro who had rebelled and driven out the Portuguese. Necessary preparations of ships, munitions, and men were made for this undertaking in India, and Andrea Furtado de Mendoça, an able and experienced soldier, was chosen general of the expedition. He sailed from Goa with six galleons, fourteen galliots and fustas, and other ships, and 1,500 fighting men, with supplies and munitions for the fleet. However, some of the smaller vessels were unable to keep up.

Furtado stopped first in Amboina, which was also in revolt against Portugal and attacked the rebels. He was very successful at this, winning every battle and pacifying the island, but he needed six months to do so.

The stragglers among his fleet did not arrive, and neither did requested help from Malacca. Being short on men and supplies, Furtado de Mendoça sent a request to Governor Bravo in the Philippines to send both for the undertaking against Ternate. The request was that the aid arrive at Ternate in January 1603.

Governor Bravo had had his eye on the Moluccas himself, and had intended to dispatch a Spanish force there at a later, opportune moment. Nevertheless, he felt it best to comply with the Portuguese request. At the end of 1602 the Spanish force was dispatched from the Philippines, taking with them the ship Santa Potenciana and three large frigates, with 150 well-armed Spanish soldiers, 10,000 fanégas of rice, 1,500 earthen jars of palm wine, 200 head of salt beef, 20 hogsheads of sardines, conserves and medicines, 50 quintals of powder, cannonballs and bullets, and cordage and other supplies, the whole in charge of Captain Joan Xuarez Gallinato, with orders to take that help to Terrenate and to place himself under the command of the Portuguese general. He made his voyage there in a fortnight, and anchored in the port of Talangame on the island of Ternate, two leguas from the fort. There he found Andrea Furtado de Mendoça with his galleons at anchor, awaiting him.

The combined force besieged the fort at Ternate. After having considerable effect, however, they found themselves without powder and were forced to raise the siege and return to Amboina.

== Second great fire of Manila ==
On April 30, 1603, a fire started in a little field house used by some Filipinos and Negroes of the native hospital in the city, at three o'clock in the afternoon, and passed to other houses so quickly, with the force of the rather fresh wind, that it could not be stopped. It burned houses of wood and stone, even the monastery of Santo Domingo, the royal hospital for Spaniards, and the royal warehouses, without leaving a building standing among them. Fourteen were dead – Spaniards, Filipinos and Negroes – including Licentiate Sanz, canon of the Manila Cathedral. 260 houses were burned, with much property that was in them. The damage was estimated at more than one million pesos.

== The Sangley Rebellion ==
There were many Chinese-Filipino mestizos in Manila, referred to as Sangleys. The Spanish were distrustful of them, partly because they suspected that the Chinese Empire had designs on the Philippines. Rumors began in the Sangley community that the Spanish and Japanese intended to massacre them.

A rich, Catholic and Hispanicized Chinese, Juan Bautista de Vera, began organizing the Chinese community for the anticipated fighting. It was thought that an insurrection of the Chinese was likely to succeed because an auspicious start would likely bring in imperial Chinese forces to conquer the islands. Vera began recruiting men and building a fort in a swamp in a hidden location near Manila.

The revolt was scheduled for late November, but fearing that the plot had been discovered, the date was advanced to October 3, 1603. On that date, 2,000 men gathered at the fort. Vera himself, still pretending to be loyal to the Spanish, reported the insurrection to Viceroy Bravo. He was suspicious and had him arrested and later executed.

That night the rebels attacked some outlying houses and one village, burning it. A skirmish took place the next day in Tondo between about 200 Spanish and 1,500 Chinese. The badly armed Chinese suffered heavy losses and were forced to withdraw. The Spaniards soon tried to follow up their victory, but after pursuing the Chinese for some distance, they were surrounded by a large force and cut to pieces. Only four of them escaped, badly wounded. These men carried the news to Manila. The Spanish weapons fell into rebel hands.

The following day, Sunday, the rebels, flushed with the victory of the preceding day and their army swelled by the additional men that joined them, attacked the city. Burning and destroying everything in their path, they crossed the river. There was no vessel with which to resist them, as all those of the Spanish fleet were in the provinces of the Pintados. The Chinese rebels entered the Parián, the Chinese quarter, and furiously assaulted the city gate, but were driven back by the arquebuses and muskets of the Spanish defenders, with the loss of many Chinese.

The Chinese were unable to take the walls of Manila, but remained in the Parián and at Dilao until the return of part of the Spanish fleet forced them to abandon those locations. The Spanish burned everything in the Parián. The Chinese now retreated from the environs of Manila. The majority fortified themselves in the mountains of San Pablo and Batangas, burning everything in their path. There they intended to await reinforcements from China. Many other Chinese, however, were killed by the Spanish around Manila or on the retreat.

The governor sent Captain Cristóval de Axqueta Menchaca with soldiers to pursue and finish the enemy. He left with 200 Spaniards — soldiers and volunteers — 300 Japanese, and 1,500 Kapampangans and Tagalogs, on October 20, 1603. He was so expeditious that with little or no loss of men, he found the Sangleys fortified in San Pablo and Batangas, and, after fighting with them, killed and destroyed them all. None escaped, except 200, who were taken alive to Manila and eventually the galleys. This assault took 20 days, and with it the war was ended. At the beginning of the war, there were not seven hundred Spaniards in the city capable of bearing arms.

More than 5,000 Chinese are thought to have been killed. After the war Manila was in great need, for not having Sangleys to work at the trades and bring in all the provisions, there was no food, nor shoes, nor other provisions, not even at excessive prices.

In June of this year two vessels were sent from Manila to New Spain. The flagship was the Nuestra Señora de los Remedios and the other vessel was the San Antonio. Many rich men of Manila, frightened by the past troubles, took passage in these vessels (especially the San Antonio) with their households and property, with the greatest wealth that had ever left the Philippines. Both vessels experienced such severe storms during the voyage, that the flagship, without masts and greatly lightened and damaged, put back in distress to Manila. The San Antonio was swallowed up in the sea, and no one was saved.

== Second expedition to the Moluccas ==
The Dutch had now encroached on the Moluccas, largely displacing the Portuguese and establishing forts and trading posts. Bravo de Acuña assembled a fleet ("which consisted of five ships, four galleys with poop-lanterns (galeras de fanal), three galliots, four champans, three funeas, two English lanchas, two brigantines, one barca chata for the artillery, and thirteen fragatas with high freeboard") in Pintados. There were 1,300 Spaniards, including volunteers. There were also some Portuguese survivors of the Dutch occupation of Tidore, 400 Filipinos, a quantity of artillery and ammunition, and provisions for nine months. The governor sailed at the head of the expedition. While he was away, Manila was left in charge of the Audiencia.

On March 15, 1606, this fleet sailed from Pintados. It arrived in Tidore later that month, where the local king welcomed them. The king complained of mistreatment by the Sultan Saidi Berkat, an ally of the Dutch on Ternate. Reinforced with some boats and 600 men including the king himself, the fleet set out for Ternate on March 31.

On April 1, after much fighting, the town and fort of Ternate fell to the Spanish, with the Dutch and Moros fleeing. The Moros soon came to make peace and did homage to the King of Spain.

Leaving garrisons at Tidore (100 soldiers) and Ternate (500), the Spanish sailed back to Manila. With them were the king of Ternate, his son, and other nobles. These individuals were well treated and shown every honour, but they were hostages. The governor entered Manila in triumph with the fleet on May 31, 1606.

== First Japanese insurrection ==
During the governor's absence in the Moluccas, the Royal Audiencia ruled in Manila. The Audiencia wished to drive a number of Japanese from the city, but when this was attempted and force employed, the Japanese resisted, and the matter came to such a pass that they took arms to oppose it. It became necessary for the Spaniards to do likewise. The affair assumed threatening proportions, and some on each side wished to give battle. However, battle was postponed by various means until, through the efforts of certain religious, the Japanese were quieted. Afterward as many as possible were embarked in vessels, much against their will. This had been a great danger to Manila, for the Spaniards were few in number, and the Japanese more than 1,500, and spirited.

== End of his term in office ==
Soon after his return from the Moluccas, Governor Bravo de Acuña died in Manila in 1606, and the Real Audiencia assumed control of government. His sudden death aroused suspicions he had been poisoned. He had accumulated considerable wealth during his administration, and as a result was subjected to a juicio de residencia (grievance tribunal), as his predecessor had been.

After his death, his property was confiscated by the Audiencia under Rodrigo de Vivero y Velasco. Vivero had been sent by the Viceroy of New Spain in 1608 to assume temporary charge of the government, and to investigate colonial officials.

== Bibliography ==
- History of the Philippine Islands by Dr. Antonio de Morga (1907), Chapter VII, "Of the government of Don Pedro de Acuña". This work is also available at Project Gutenberg:

Political offices
Preceded by Francisco de Tello de Guzmán	Governor and Captain-General of the Philippines; 1602–1606	Succeeded by Cristóbal Téllez Almazán
