= Onjuku =

Onjuku 御宿町
- Town
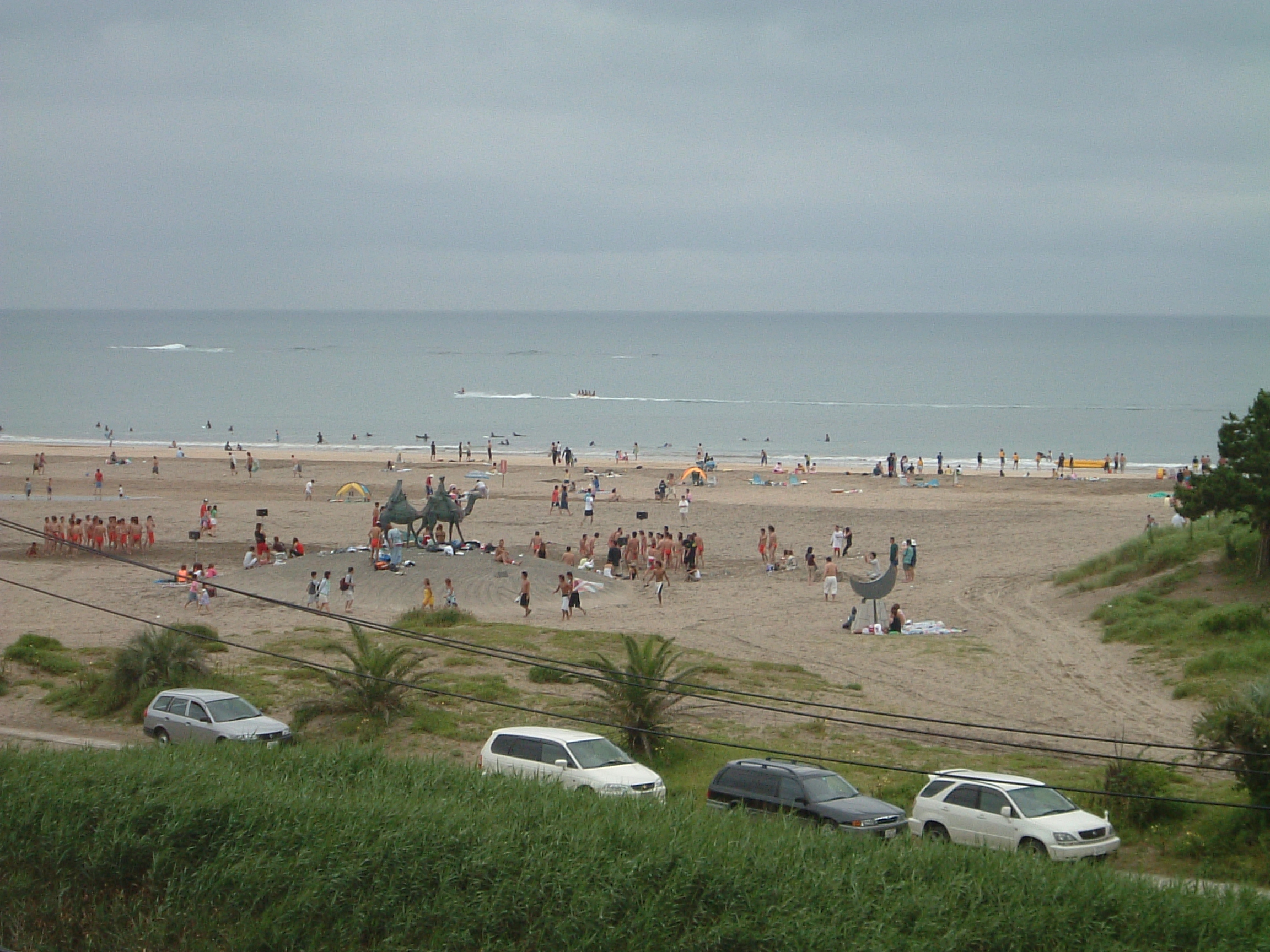
- Beach at Onjuku

- Flag Seal

- Location of Onjuku in Chiba Prefecture

- Coordinates: 35°11′29.4″N 140°20′55.7″E
- Country: Japan
- Region: Kantō
- Prefecture: Chiba
- District: Isumi District

Area
  - Total: 24.86 km^{2} (9.60 sq mi)

Population (November 30, 2018)
  - Total: 7,523
  - Density: 302.6/km^{2} (783.8/sq mi)
- Time zone: UTC+9 (Japan Standard Time)
- Postal code: 299
- Tree: Oleander
- Phone number: 0470-68-2511
- Address: 1522 Saga, Onjuku-machi, Chiba-ken 299-5192
- Website: Official website

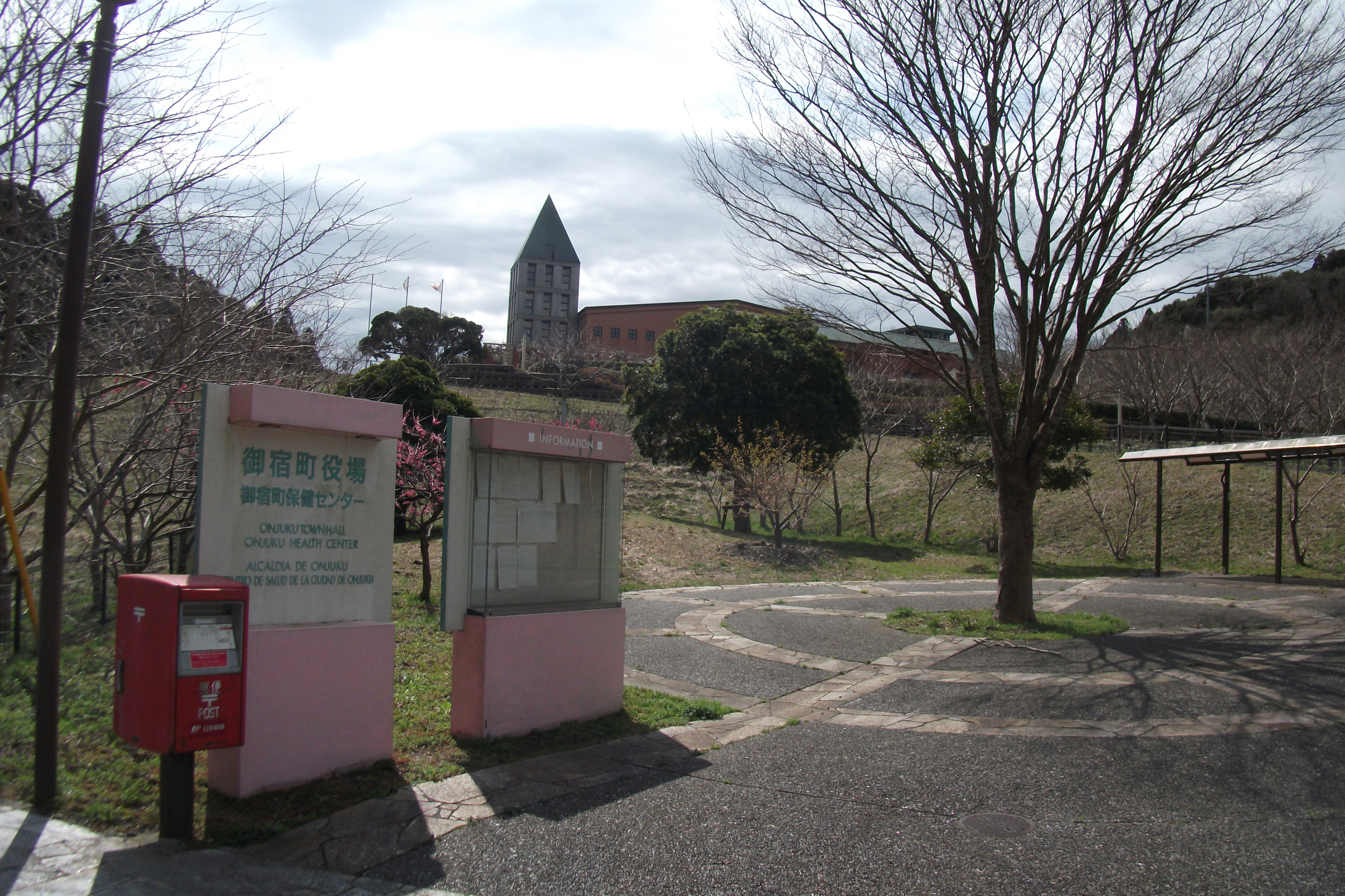
Onjuku Town Hall

Onjuku (御宿町, Onjuku-machi) is a town located in Chiba, Japan. As of 30 November 2018, the town had an estimated population of 7,523 in 3683 households and a population density of 300 persons per km^{2}. The total area of the town is 24.86 square kilometres (9.60 sq mi). The name of the town is made of two kanji characters: the first 御 meaning "honorable", and the second 宿 meaning "residence".

== Geography ==
Onjuku is located on the east coast of southern Chiba Prefecture in approximately the center of the outer coast of the Bōsō Peninsula. The landscape consists of rolling, sandy hills of the Bōsō Hill Range, and the town is noted for its beach resorts. Its broad beaches are protected as part of the Minami Bōsō Quasi-National Park. The town is about 50 kilometers from the prefectural capital at Chiba, and 70 to 80 kilometers from central Tokyo. Onjuku faces Ajiro Bay, which has two functional ports: the Port of Iwawada to the north, and the Port of Onjuku to the south. One small river, the Kiyomizu River, flows through the town to Ajiro Bay.

=== Surrounding municipalities ===
Chiba Prefecture

- Isumi (to the west and north)
- Katsuura (to the south)

=== Climate ===
Onjuku has a humid subtropical climate (Köppen Cfa) characterized by warm summers and cool winters with light to no snowfall. The average annual temperature in Onjuku is 15.1 °C. The average annual rainfall is 1904 mm with September as the wettest month. The temperatures are highest on average in August, at around 25.5 °C, and lowest in January, at around 5.8 °C.

== Demographics ==
Per Japanese census data, the population of Onjuku has been gradually decreasing over the past 70 years.

Historical population
Year	Pop.	±%
1950	10,277	—
1960	9,273	−9.8%
1970	8,475	−8.6%
1980	8,486	+0.1%
1990	7,939	−6.4%
2000	8,019	+1.0%
2010	7,738	−3.5%
2020	6,874	−11.2%

== History ==
=== Early history ===
Onjuku is part of ancient Kazusa Province. The pines and sand of Ajiro Bay in Onjuku were referenced in a poem by Hōjō Tokiyori (1227–1263), a Kamakura-period administrator.

=== Edo Period ===
Onjuku, from the Muromachi to the Edo period, was divided into a complex mixture of administrative areas. Much of the town was tenryō territory ruled by various hatamoto on behalf of the Shōgun. The town was typically associated with administrators from the Ōtaki and Iwatsuki domains. In the Edo period a prominent “rokusai’ichi” (六斎市) market, or open-air market held on fixed days six times a month, developed in Onjuku.

=== Landing of Rodrigo de Vivero ===
In 1609 a Spanish galleon, the San Francisco, ran aground near Onjuku. The captain and 300 survivors were cared for by the town, and later, the sailors were given a ship by the Tokugawa shogunate to return to Mexico. One of the survivors was Governor General of the Philippines Rodrigo de Vivero, who was subsequently granted an audience with shōgun Tokugawa Ieyasu. In 1928 a tower was built in Onjuku to commemorate the landing of Rodrigo and friendly relations between Mexico, Spain, and Japan. It has since been designated a Prefectural Historic Monument (県指定史跡 (ken shitei shiseki)), and is surrounded by an extensive garden complex.

=== Current administration ===
The village of Onjuku was created on April 1, 1889, with the early Meiji period establishment of the municipalities system, and was elevated to town status on April 1, 1914. The town expanded through annexation of areas of the neighboring villages of Fuse and Namihana on March 1, 1955.

== Government ==
Onjuku has a mayor-council form of government with a directly elected mayor and a unicameral town council of 12 members. Onjuku, together with the city of Isumi contributes one member to the Chiba Prefectural Assembly. In terms of national politics, the town is part of Chiba 11th district of the lower house of the Diet of Japan.

== Economy ==
The economy of Onjuku is dominated by summer tourism and commercial fishing; agriculture plays a relatively small role in the economy compared to nearby municipalities. Commercial coastal and off-shore fishing operations are active, with squid and bonito being the most important catches. Ama, or traditional women divers, gather abalone, turban shell (sazae), and spiny lobster, all important parts of the traditional Japanese diet.

The sandy beaches of Onjuku are the representative swimming areas of the Sotobōsō Coast and attract numerous tourists during the summer months. Tourism in the town began in the Meiji period, and development of the tourism industry continues. Numerous guests houses, ryokan (traditional Japanese inns), and hotels have developed in the area.

== Education ==
Onjuku has one public elementary school and one public middle school operated by the town government. The town also has one private elementary school and one private high school.

== Sports ==
Due to the infrastructure and sandy beach with good surf conditions, the locality holds the yearly national surf carnival of the Japan Lifesaving Association, in which surf lifesavers gather from all clubs over the country. In 2013, the worldwide 2013 International Surf Rescue Challenge is held here.

== Transportation ==
=== Railway ===
JR East – Sotobō Line

- Onjuku

=== Highway ===
- National Route 128

== Sister cities ==
- Acapulco, Mexico, since August 7, 1978
- Tecamachalco, Puebla, Mexico
