= Onjuku Station =

Railway station in Onjuku, Chiba Prefecture, Japan

Onjuku Station 御宿駅
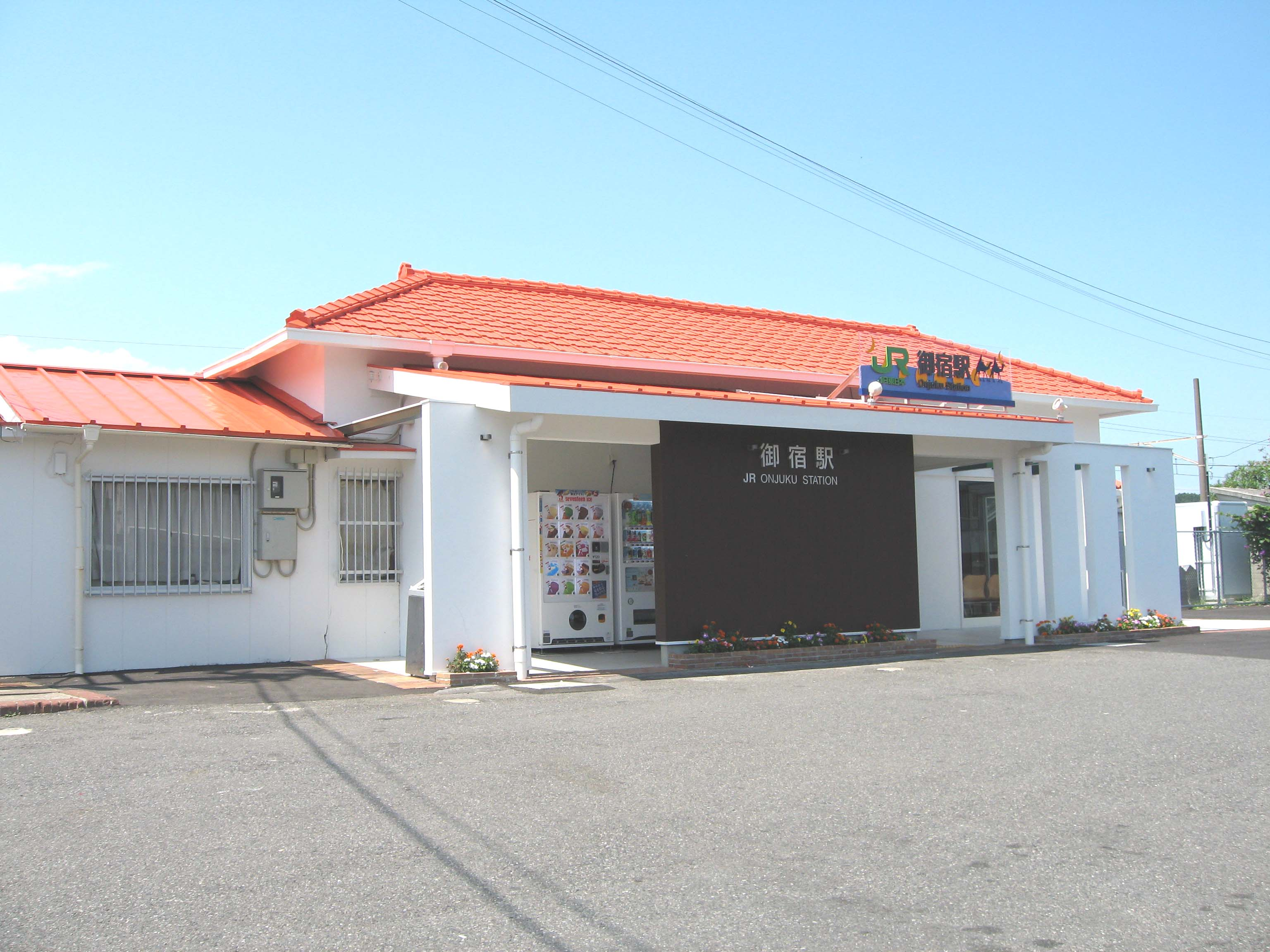
- Onjuku Station

General information
- Location: Suka 195, Onjuku-machi, Isumi-gun, Chiba-ken 299-5106; Japan
- Coordinates: 35.1880°N 140.3519°E
- Operator: JR East
- Line: ■ Sotobō Line
- Distance: 65.4 km from Chiba
- Platforms: 1 island platform

Other information
- Status: Staffed (Midori no Madoguchi)
- Website: Official website

History
- Opened: 20 March 1913; 113 years ago

Passengers
- FY2019: 522 daily

Services
Preceding station	JR East	Following station
Ōhara towards Tokyo	Wakashio	Katsuura towards Awa-Kamogawa
Namihana towards Soga	Sotobō Line Keiyō Rapid	Katsuura Terminus
Namihana towards Soga or Chiba	Sotobō Line Local	Katsuura towards Awa-Kamogawa
Location
- Location within Chiba Prefecture Location within Japan

Onjuku Station (御宿駅, Onjuku-eki) is a passenger railway station located in the town of Onjuku, Chiba Prefecture Japan, operated by the East Japan Railway Company (JR East).

== Lines ==
Onjuku Station is served by the Sotobō Line, and lies 65.4 km (40.6 mi) from the starting point of the line at Chiba Station.

== Station layout ==
Onjuku Station has a single island platform connected to a white-washed station building by a footbridge. The station has a Midori no Madoguchi staffed ticket office.

=== Platform ===
1	■ Sotobō Line	Katsuura, Awa-Kamogawa
2	■ Sotobō Line	For Kazusa-Ichinomiya, Mobara, Soga, Chiba

== History ==
Onjuku Station was opened on 20 March 1913. It was absorbed into the JR East network upon the privatization of the Japan National Railways (JNR) on 1 April 1987.

== Passenger statistics ==
In fiscal 2019, the station was used by an average of 522 passengers daily (boarding passengers only).

== Surrounding area ==
- National Route 128

== See also ==
- List of railway stations in Japan
