= San Luis Rassini =

- Formerly: SANLUIS
- Headquarters: Mexico

Rassini is a company based in Mexico. It produces vehicle parts such as springs, suspension components, and disc brakes.

Formerly known as SANLUIS, Rassini is a Mexican company that produces leaf springs, coil springs, rubber bushings and brake discs, drums and hubs. It has three facilities in U.S.A., two are manufacturing facilities and one is a Technical center located in Plymouth MI.

In 2000, Rassini opened a technical center in Plymouth, MI to support customers in NA. In 2001, it opened a plant in Montpelier, Ohio after negotiating with city officials, making it the first Mexican company to set up operations in the state. In 2014, it opened a facility in Flint MI to produce brake discs.
