= Noriteru Fukushima =

Japanese Ambassador to Mexico

His Excellency Noriteru Fukushima
- 福嶌教輝
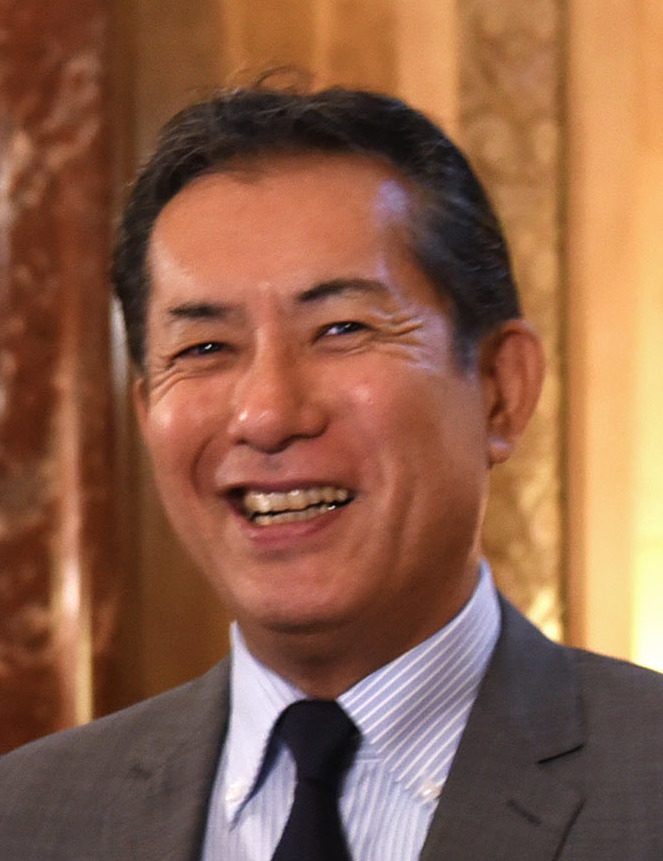

Japanese Ambassador to Mexico
- Incumbent
- Assumed office October 2021

Japanese Ambassador to Argentina
- In office May 2015 – August 2019

Personal details
- Born: June 3, 1959 (age 67) Mexico City, Mexico
- Citizenship: Japanese; Mexican
- Education: Kyoto University

Noriteru Jaime Fukushima Ichimori (Japanese: 福嶌教輝; born June 3, 1959) is a Mexican-Japanese diplomat who has served as Japanese Ambassador to Mexico since 2021. Born in Mexico to parents from Japan, Fukushima holds dual citizenship. He previously served as Japanese Ambassador to Argentina.

== Early life and education ==
Noriteru Fukushima was born on June 3, 1959, in Polanco, Mexico City, Mexico. His parents moved from Japan to Mexico in 1954. In an interview, he stated that their arrival in Mexico coincided with Japan's post-war reconstruction period, and that his parents experienced a culture shock.

Fukushima said that he "always wanted to go back" after they moved away from Mexico during childhood. He graduated from Kyoto University School of Law in 1981 and joined the Japanese Ministry of Foreign Affairs.

== Career ==
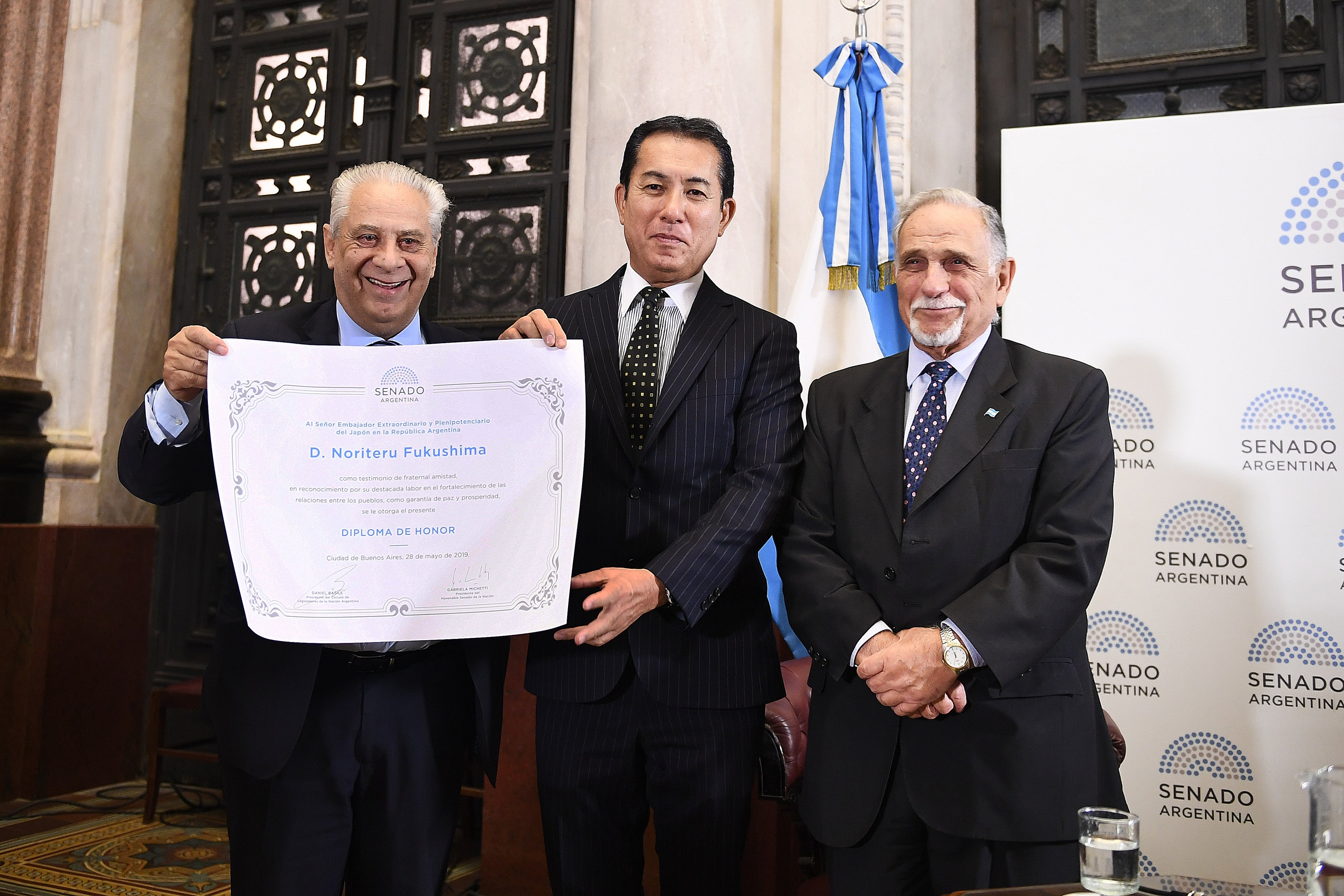
Fukushima receiving a Diploma of Honor in the Senate of Argentina in 2019

Fukushima was appointed to serve as Japan's Ambassador to Argentina in July 2015. As Ambassador, Fukushima pushed for increased Japanese investment in Argentina's economy. While in office, Fukushima advocated for Argentina's ascension to the OECD. During his time in office, he received the Order of the Liberator General San Martín award. He left office in August 2019.

In October 2021, he was appointed Japanese Ambassador to Mexico. He is a dual citizen of Japan and Mexico. In 2022, he stated that "Mexico is a very important country for Japan" regarding future economic partnerships.

== Personal life ==
After being appointed Ambassador to Mexico, Fukushima accumulated a sizable following on social media. His high-profile stature on social media led to comparisons with Christopher Landau, who served as U.S. Ambassador to Mexico during the Trump administration.
