= Rodrigo de Vivero y Velasco =

Rodrigo de Vivero y Velasco was a Spanish colonial officer from New Spain. His parents were Don Rodrigo de Vivero and Doña Antonia de Velasco, the sister of Luís de Velasco, second Viceroy of New Spain. In 1563 he married Alonso Valiente's widow, Melchora de Aberrucia. As a result, he gained control of the encomienda of Tecamachalco. Their son, Rodrigo de Vivero y Aberrucia, became the first Count of the Valley of Orizaba and Spanish interim governor of the Philippines.
