= Tecamachalco, Puebla =

Tecamachalco
- Municipality
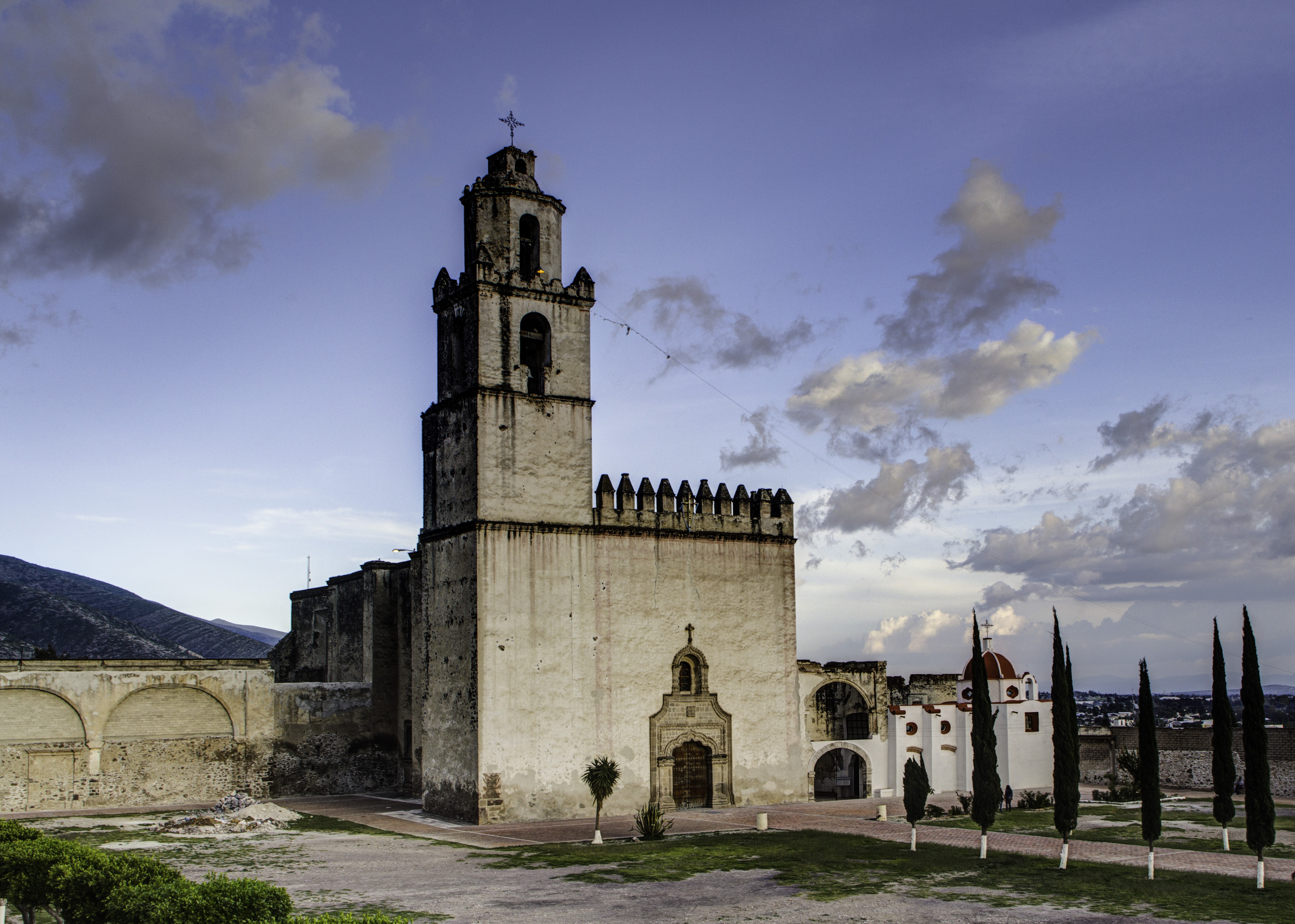
- Former convent of Tecamachalco, Puebla

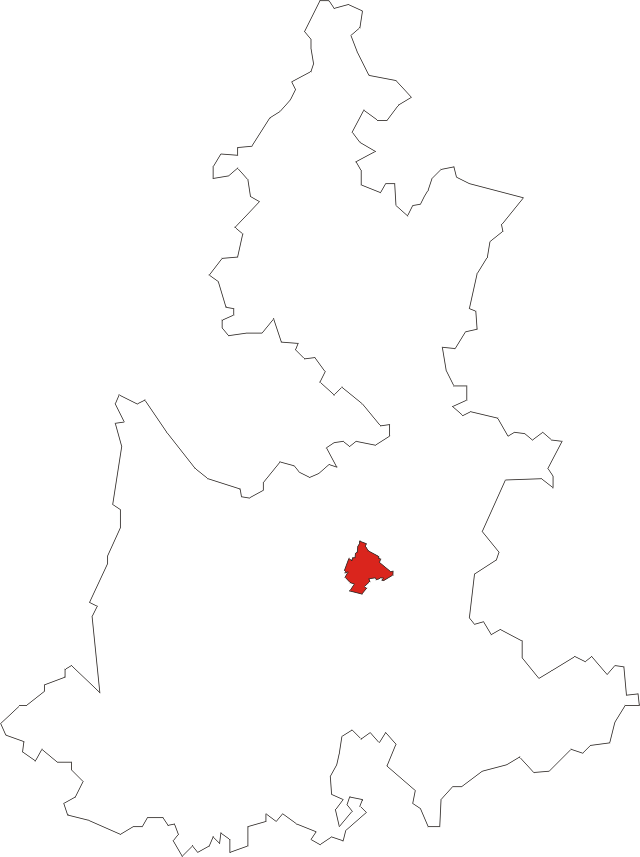
- Tecamachalco within Puebla
- Coordinates: 18°52′N 97°43′W
- Country: Mexico
- State: Puebla
- Seat: Tecamachalco

Government
  - Municipal president: Inés Saturnino López Ponce

Area
  - Total: 218.15 km^{2} (84.23 sq mi)

Population
  - Total: 60,000
  - Density: 280/km^{2} (710/sq mi)
- Time zone: UTC-6 (Zona Centro)

Tecamachalco is a municipality located in the state of Puebla, in central Mexico.

In prehispanic times, the language of Tecamachalco was Popoloca, though the elite likely spoke Nahuatl.
