= Hon-Chiba Station =

Railway station in Chiba, Japan

Hon-Chiba Station 本千葉駅
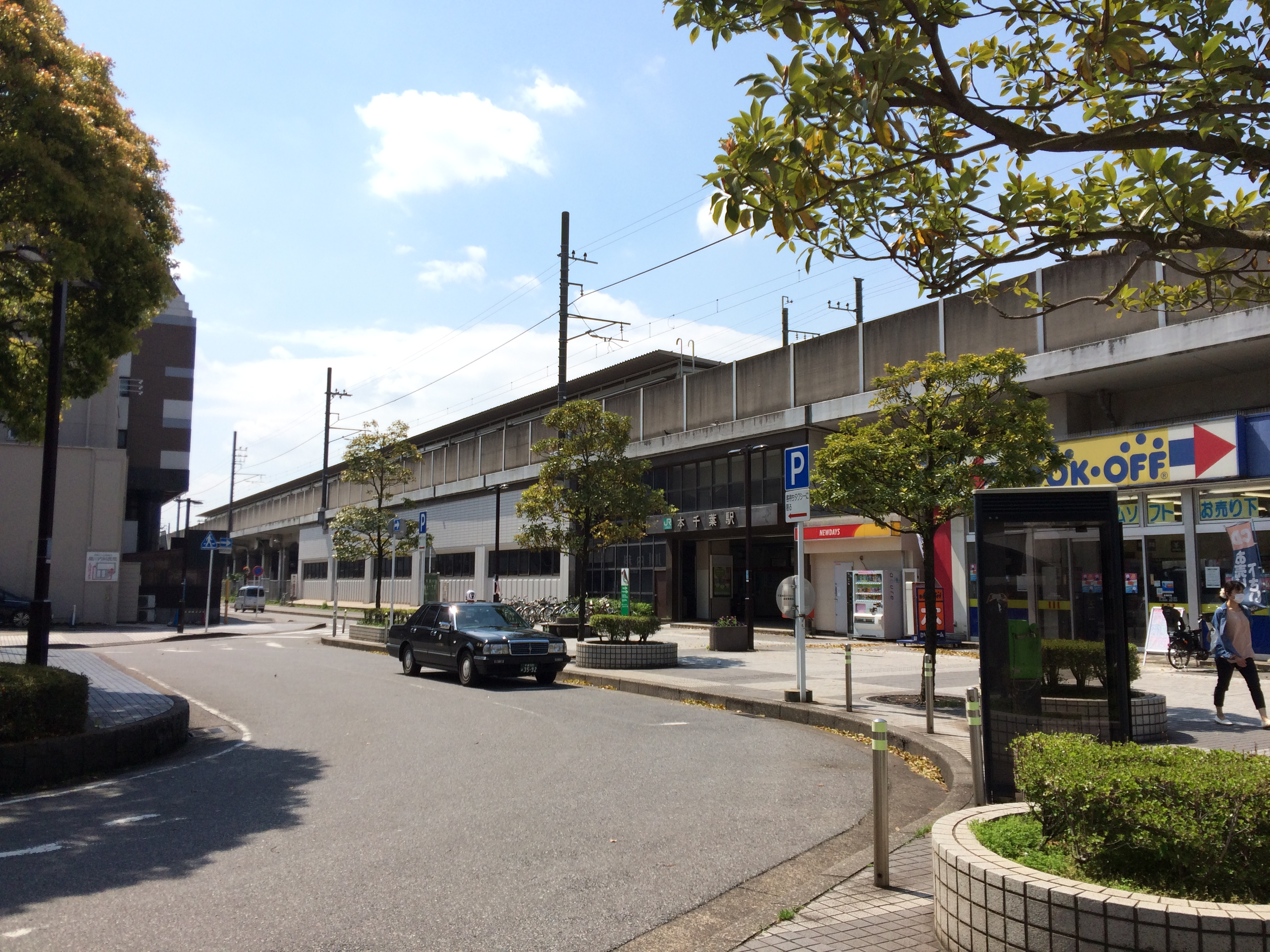
- Hon-Chiba Station, April 2015

General information
- Location: 1 Nagazu, Chūō-ku, Chiba-shi, Chiba-ken 260-0854; Japan
- Coordinates: 35°36′03.93″N 140°07′15.66″E
- Operator: JR East
- Lines: ■ Uchibō Line; ■ Sotobō Line
- Distance: 1.4 km from Chiba
- Platforms: 1 island platform

Other information
- Status: Staffed
- Website: Official website

History
- Opened: 25 February 1896; 130 years ago
- Former names: Samukawa (until 1902)

Passengers
- FY2019: 11,901 daily

Services
Preceding station	JR East	Following station
Chiba Terminus	Sotobō / Uchibō lines Sobū Rapid	Soga towards Kazusa-Ichinomiya or Kimitsu
Chiba Terminus	Sotobō / Uchibō lines Local	Soga towards Awa-Kamogawa
Location
- Location within Chiba Prefecture Location within Japan

Hon-Chiba station (本千葉駅, Hon-Chiba-eki) is a junction passenger railway station located in Chūō-ku, Chiba, Chiba Prefecture, Japan, operated by the East Japan Railway Company (JR East).

== Lines ==
Hon-Chiba Station is served by the Sotobō Line, and is located 1.4 km (0.87 mi) from the starting point of the line at Chiba Station. It is also served by trains of the Uchibō Line which continue past the nominal terminus of that line at Soga Station to terminate at Chiba as well.

== Station layout ==
Hon-Chiba station consists of a single island platform serving two tracks. The station is elevated, with the station building below. The station is attended. The east side of the station is much busier than the west side.

=== Platforms ===
1	■ Uchibō Line	for Ōami, Togane, Naruto, Mobara
1	■ Sotobō Line	for Goi, Kisarazu
2	■ Uchibō Line	for Chiba, Tokyo
2	■ Sotobō Line	for Chiba, Tokyo

== History ==
Hon-Chiba is among the older stations of Japan, having opened as Samukawa Station (寒川駅, Samukawa-eki) on the Bōsō Railway on 25 February 1896. It was renamed to its present name on 28 January 1902. On 1 September 1907, the Bōsō Railway was nationalized and became part of the Japanese Government Railways, which was transformed into the Japan National Railways (JNR) after World War II. At the time of its construction, Hon-Chiba Station was located close to present day Keisei Chiba-Chūō Station, but it was heavily damaged in World War II, and subsequently moved to its current location on 1 February 1958. In 1972 Emperor Hirohito used this station while on his way to inspect the Chiba Prefectural Cancer Center. The station became part of the JR East network upon the privatization of the Japan National Railways (JNR) on 1 April 1987.

== Passenger statistics ==
In fiscal 2019, the station was used by an average of 11,901 passengers daily (boarding passengers only).

== Surroundings ==
Hon-Chiba station is located in the heart of Chiba City. Rather than being located close to Chiba Station, Chiba prefectural office, Chiba District Court, and other government buildings can instead be found to the north of this station. Kenchō-mae Station on the Chiba Urban Monorail Line 1 is within a few minutes walking distance.

Also nearby:

- Kashiwado Hospital
- Chiba-Chūō Bus Headquarters
- Chiba Budōkan
- Samukawa Shrine
- Itsukushima Shrine
- Chiba University (Medicine & Nursing)
- Chiba Prefectural Chiba Senior High School and Chiba Junior High School
- Chiba Prefectural Library
- Chiba Municipal Samukawa Elementary School

== See also ==
- List of railway stations in Japan
