= Gumyō Station =

Railway station in Tōgane, Chiba Prefecture, Japan

Gumyō Station 求名駅
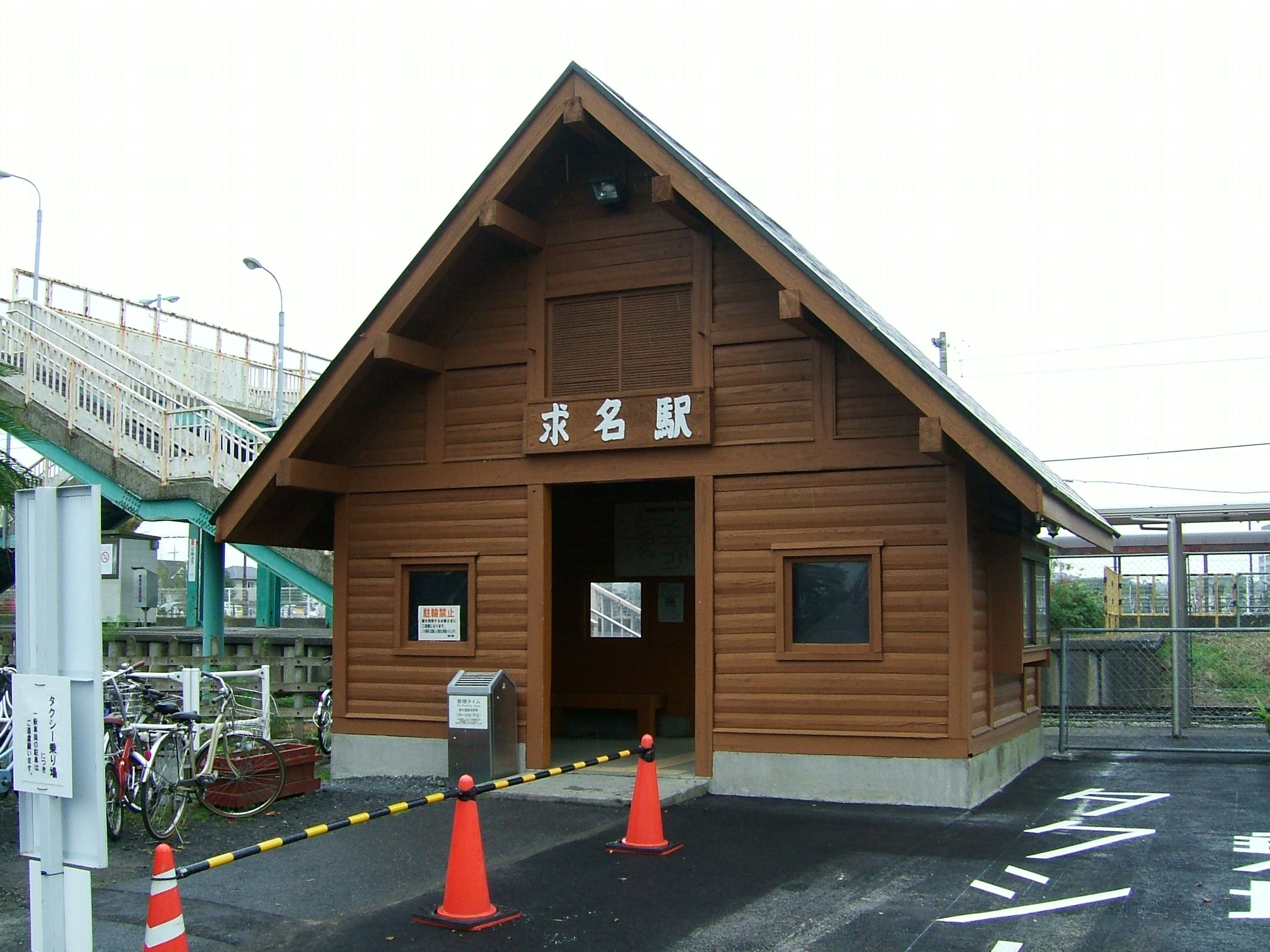
- Gumyō Station

General information
- Location: Gumyō 141, Tōgane-shi, Chiba-ken 283-0002; Japan
- Coordinates: 35.5798°N 140.3961°E
- Operator: JR East
- Line: ■ Tōgane Line
- Distance: 9.6 km from Ōami
- Platforms: 2 side platforms
- Tracks: 2

Other information
- Status: Unstaffed
- Website: Official website

History
- Opened: November 1, 1911

Passengers
- FY2019: 2024 daily

Services
Preceding station	JR East	Following station
Tōgane towards Ōami	Tōgane Line	Narutō Terminus
Location
- Location within Chiba Prefecture Location within Japan

Gumyō Station (求名駅, Gumyō-eki) is a passenger railway station in the city of Tōgane, Chiba Japan, operated by the East Japan Railway Company (JR East).

== Lines ==
Gumyō Station is served by the Tōgane Line between Ōami and Narutō, and is located 9.6 kilometers from the terminus of the line at Ōami Station.

== Station layout ==
Gumyō Station consists of two opposed side platforms. The platforms are short, and can only handle trains with a length of six carriages or less. The station is staffed.

=== Platform ===
1	■ Tōgane Line	For Narutō
2	■ Tōgane Line	For Ōami , Chiba

== History ==
Gumyō Station was opened on November 1, 1911 as a station on the Japanese Government Railways (JGR), which became the Japan National Railways (JNR) after World War II. All scheduled freight operations were discontinued from October 1, 1962. The station was absorbed into the JR East network upon the privatization of the JNR on April 1, 1987.

== Passenger statistics ==
In fiscal 2019, the station was used by an average of 2024 passengers daily (boarding passengers only).

== Surrounding area ==
- National Route 126
- Josai International University Chiba Togane Campus
- Chiba Prefectural Police Academy
- Chiba Gakugei High School

== See also ==
- List of railway stations in Japan
