= Shin-Mobara Station =

Railway station in Mobara, Chiba Prefecture, Japan

Shim-Mobara Station 新茂原駅
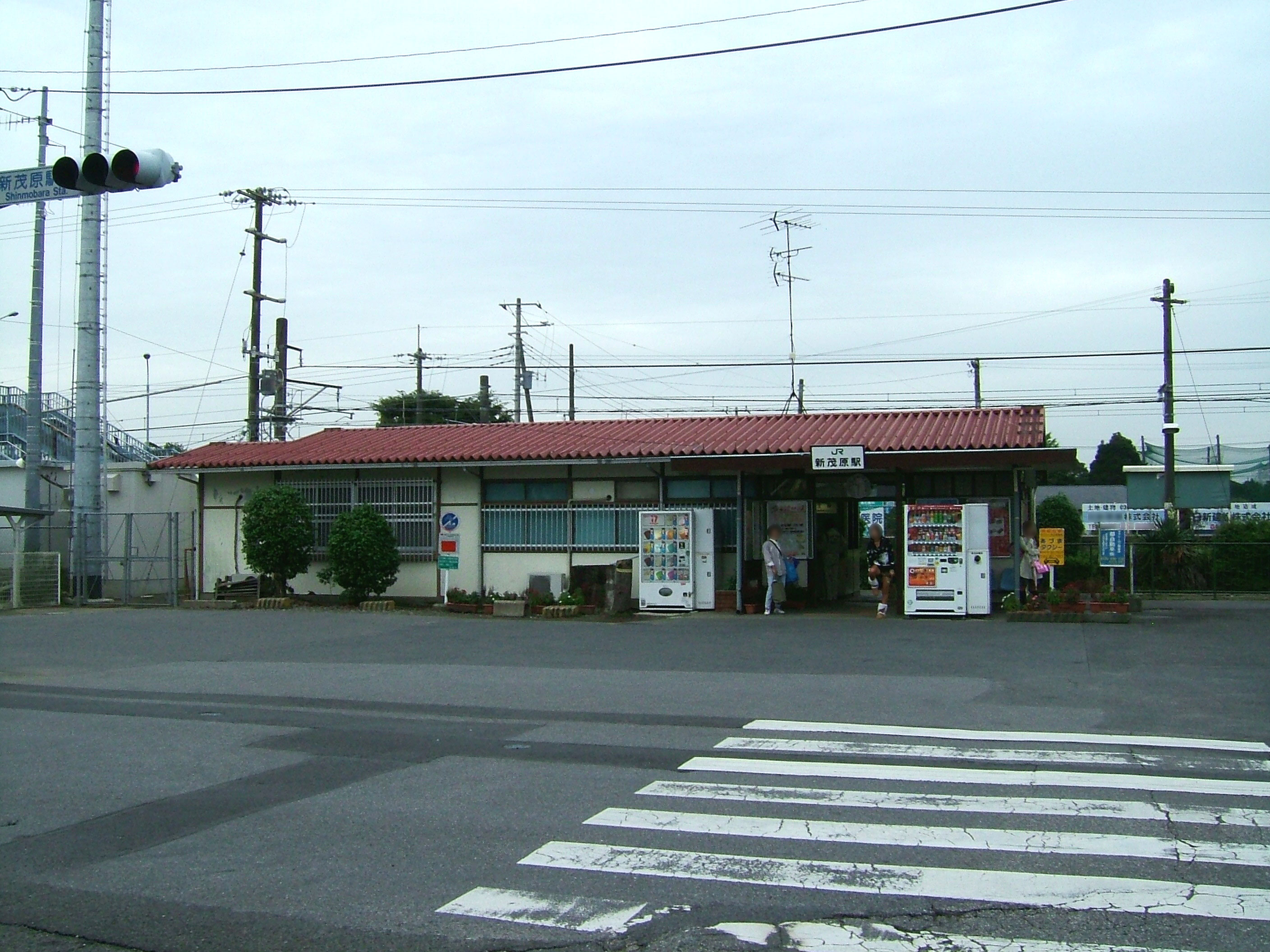
- Shim-Mobara Station

General information
- Location: Nagao 2667, Mobara-shi, Chiba-ken 297-0073; Japan
- Coordinates: 35.4495°N 140.3001°E
- Operator: JR East
- Line: ■ Sotobō Line
- Distance: 31.4 km from Chiba
- Platforms: 1 island platform

Other information
- Status: Staffed
- Website: Official website

History
- Opened: 1 September 1955; 70 years ago

Passengers
- FY2019: 1,259 daily

Services
Preceding station	JR East	Following station
Honnō (limited service) towards Soga	Sotobō Line Keiyō Rapid (limited service)	Mobara towards Katsuura
Honnō towards Soga or Chiba	Sotobō Line Local	Mobara towards Awa-Kamogawa
Location
- Location within Chiba Prefecture Location within Japan

Shim-Mobara Station (新茂原駅, Shim-Mobara-eki) is a passenger railway station located in the city of Mobara, Chiba Prefecture Japan, operated by the East Japan Railway Company (JR East).

== Lines ==
Shin-Mobara Station is served by the Sotobō Line, and is located 31.4 km (19.5 mi) from the official starting point of the line at Chiba Station.

== Station layout ==
The station consists of a single island platform serving two tracks, connected to a one-story station building. The station is staffed.

=== Platform ===
1	■ Sotobō Line	For Mobara, Kazusa-Ichinomiya, Katsuura, Awa-Kamogawa
2	■ Sotobō Line	For Ōami, Soga, Chiba

== History ==
Shin-Mobara Station was opened on 1 September 1955 as a passenger station on the Japan National Railways. Freight operations began on 1 December 1981, with the construction of a spur line to the nearby Mitsui Kagagu Ichihara factory. The station joined the JR East network upon the privatization of the Japan National Railways (JNR) on 1 April 1987, with freight operations coming under the control of the Japan Freight Railway Company. Freight container operations began from October 1994, but were discontinued in March 1996 and all freight operations ceased from 1 April 1999.

== Passenger statistics ==
In fiscal 2019, the station was used by an average of 1,259 passengers daily (boarding passengers only).

== Surrounding area ==
- National Route 128
- Mitsui Chemical - Mobara factory

== See also ==
- List of railway stations in Japan
