= Kamatori Station =

Railway station in Chiba, Japan

Kamatori Station 鎌取駅
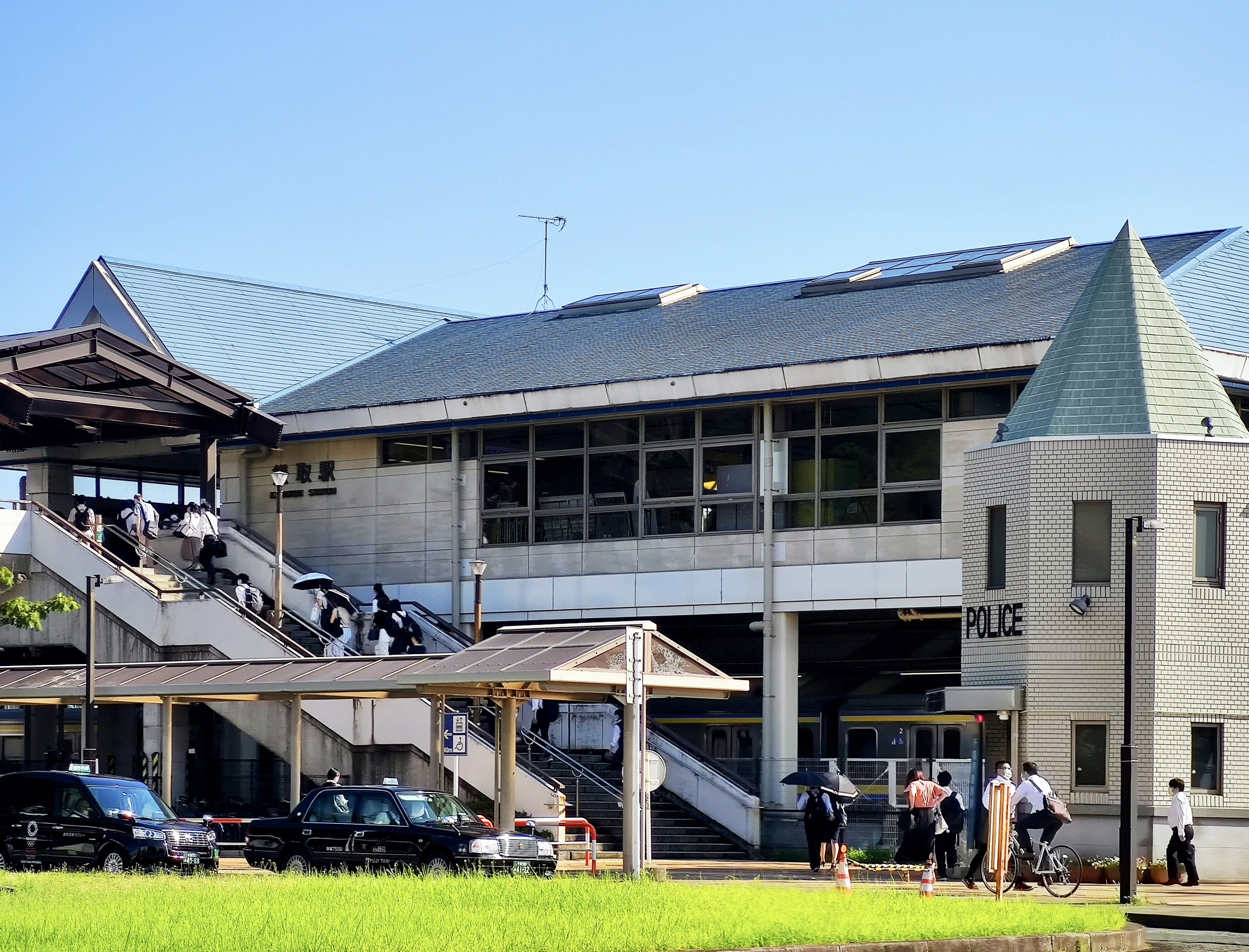
- Kamatori Station South Exit, July 2020

General information
- Location: Kamatori-chō 787-3, Midori-ku, Chiba-shi, Chiba-ken, 266-0011; Japan
- Coordinates: 35.5627°N 140.1785°E
- Operator: JR East
- Line: ■ Sotobō Line
- Distance: 8.8 km from Chiba
- Platforms: 1 island platform

Other information
- Status: Staffed
- Website: Official website

History
- Opened: 15 June 1952; 74 years ago

Passengers
- FY2019: 20,693

Services
Preceding station	JR East	Following station
Soga Terminus	Sotobō Line Keiyō Rapid	Honda towards Katsuura
Soga towards Chiba	Sotobō Line Sobū Rapid	Honda towards Kazusa-Ichinomiya
Soga towards Chiba	Sotobō Line Local	Honda towards Awa-Kamogawa
Location
- Location within Chiba Prefecture Location within Japan

Kamatori Station (鎌取駅, Kamatori-eki) is a passenger railway station located in Midori-ku, Chiba, Japan operated by the East Japan Railway Company (JR East).

== Lines ==
Kamatori Station is served by the Sotobō Line, and is located 8.8 km (5.5 mi) from the terminus of the line at Chiba Station.

== Station layout ==
The station consists of a single island platform with an elevated station building built over the tracks and platform. The station has a Reserved seat ticket vending machine.

=== Platform ===
1	■ Sotobō Line	Ōami, Mobara, Katsuura, Awa-Kamogawa
3	■ Sotobō Line	For Soga, Chiba, Tokyo

== History ==
Kamatori Station was opened on 15 June 1952 as a station on the Japan National Railways. A new station building was completed on March 23, 1986. The station became part of the JR East network upon the privatization of the Japan National Railways (JNR) on 1 April 1987.

== Passenger statistics ==
In fiscal 2019, the station was used by an average of 20,693 passengers daily (boarding passengers only).

== Surrounding area ==
- Chiba City Midori Ward Office
- Chiba City Kamatori Community Center
- Chiba City Midori Library
