= Honnō Station =

Railway station in Mobara, Chiba Prefecture, Japan

Honnō Station 本納駅
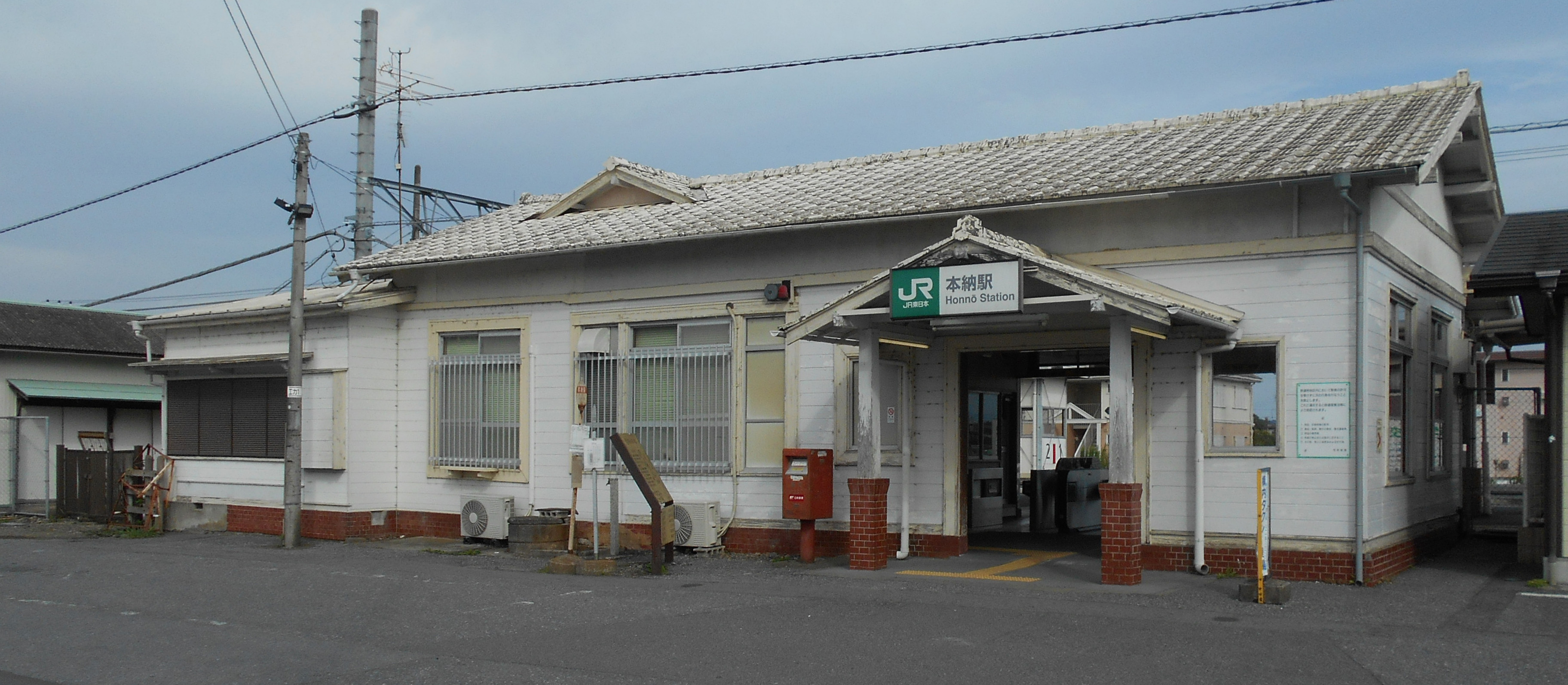
- Honnō Station in September 2017

General information
- Location: Honnō, Mobara-shi, Chiba-ken 299-4114; Japan
- Coordinates: 35.4822°N 140.3074°E
- Operator: JR East
- Line: ■ Sotobō Line
- Distance: 27.7 km from Chiba
- Platforms: 1 side + 1 island platform
- Tracks: 3
- Connections: Bus stop

Other information
- Status: Staffed
- Website: Official website

History
- Opened: 17 April 1897; 129 years ago

Passengers
- FY2019: 1,605 daily

Services
| Preceding station | JR East | Following station |
|---|---|---|
| Nagata (limited service) towards Soga | Sotobō Line Keiyō Rapid (limited service) | Shin-Mobara (limited service) towards Katsuura |
| Nagata towards Soga or Chiba | Sotobō Line Local | Shin-Mobara towards Awa-Kamogawa |
Location
- Location within Chiba Prefecture Location within Japan

Honnō Station (本納駅, Honnō-eki) is a passenger railway station located in the city of Mobara, Chiba Prefecture Japan, operated by the East Japan Railway Company (JR East).

== Lines ==
Honnō Station is served by the Sotobō Line, and lies 27.7 km (17.2 mi) from the starting point of the line at Chiba Station.

== Station layout ==
The station consists of a side platform and an island platform, serving three tracks, connected to a one-story wooden station building by a footbridge. The station is staffed

=== Platform ===
| 1 | ■ Sotobō Line | for Mobara, Kazusa-Ichinomiya, Katsuura, and Awa-Kamogawa |
| 2 | ■ Sotobō Line | for Mobara, Kazusa-Ichinomiya, Katsuura, and Awa-Kamogawa for Ōami, Soga, and Chiba |
| 3 | ■ Sotobō Line | for Ōami, Soga, and Chiba |

== History ==
Honnō Station opened on 17 April 1897, as a station on the Bōsō Railway. It was absorbed into the Japanese Government Railways on September 1, 1907. Freight operations at the station were discontinued from 1 July 1971. With the privatization of Japanese National Railways (JNR) on 1 April 1987, the station came under the control of JR East.

== Passenger statistics ==
In fiscal 2019, the station was used by an average of 1,605 passengers daily (boarding passengers only).

== Surrounding area ==
- National Route 128
- Chosei Municipal Hospital

== See also ==
- List of railway stations in Japan
