= Honda Station =

Railway station in Chiba, Japan

Honda Station 誉田駅
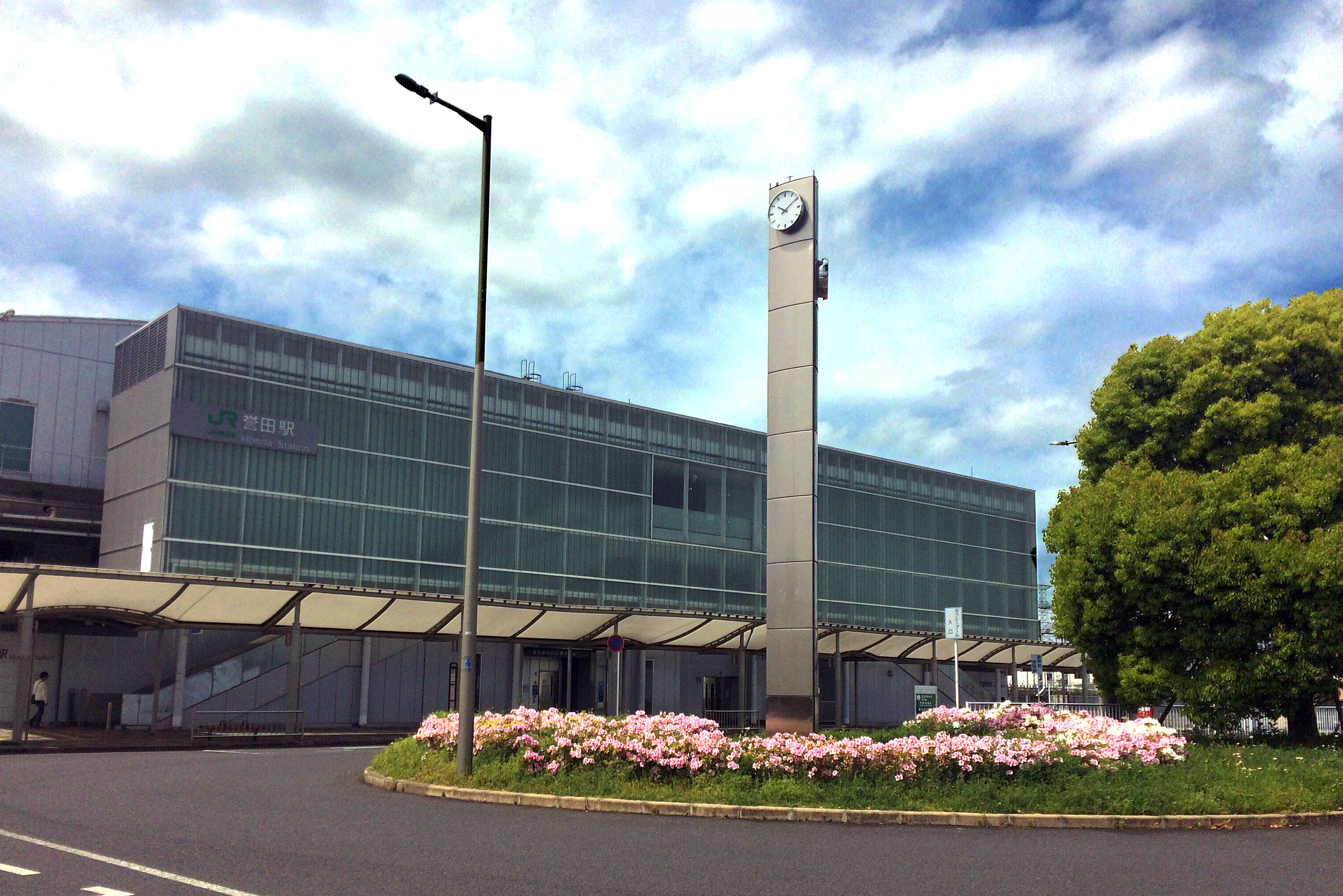
- North Exit of Honda Station, May 2017

General information
- Location: Honda-chō 24, Midori-ku, Chiba-shi, Chiba-ken, 266-0005; Japan
- Coordinates: 35.5471°N 140.2142°E
- Operator: JR East
- Line: ■ Sotobō Line
- Distance: 12.6 km from Chiba
- Platforms: 1 side +1 island platform
- Connections: Bus stop

Other information
- Status: Staffed
- Website: Official website

History
- Opened: 20 January 1896; 130 years ago
- Former names: Noda (until 1914)

Passengers
- FY2019: 7,034

Services
Preceding station	JR East	Following station
Kamatori towards Soga	Sotobō Line Keiyō Rapid	Toke towards Katsuura
Kamatori towards Chiba	Sotobō Line Sobū Rapid	Toke towards Kazusa-Ichinomiya
Kamatori towards Soga or Chiba	Sotobō Line Local	Toke towards Awa-Kamogawa
Location
- Location within Chiba Prefecture Location within Japan

Honda Station (誉田駅, Honda-eki) is a passenger railway station located in Midori-ku, Chiba, Japan operated by the East Japan Railway Company (JR East).

== Lines ==
Honda Station is served by the Sotobō Line, and is located 12.6 km (7.8 mi) from the terminus of the line at Chiba Station. Some Sotobō Line limited express Wakashio services from Tokyo to Awa-Kamogawa stop at this station.

== Station layout ==
Honda Station has a single side platform and a single island platform with an elevated station building built over the tracks and platforms. The station is staffed.

=== Platform ===
1, 2	■ Sotobō Line	Ōami, Mobara, Katsuura, Awa-Kamogawa
2, 3	■ Sotobō Line	For Soga, Chiba, Tokyo

== History ==
Honda Station was opened on 20 January 1896 as Noda Station (野田駅, Noda-eki) on the Bōsō Railway. On 1 September 1907, the Bōsō Railway was nationalized and became part of the Japanese Government Railways, which was transformed into the Japan National Railways (JNR) after World War II. The station was renamed to its present name on 1 December 1914. Freight operations were discontinued on 1 October 1962. The station became part of the JR East network upon the privatization of the Japan National Railways (JNR) on 1 April 1987. A new station building was completed in March 2006.

== Passenger statistics ==
In fiscal 2019, the station was used by an average of 7,034 passengers daily (boarding passengers only).

== Surrounding area ==
- Honda Station Post Office
- Chiba City Honda Community Center
- Chiba City Honda Junior High School
