= Hyūga =

Hyūga or Hyuuga may refer to:

- Hyūga, Miyazaki, a city in Japan
- Hyūga Province, an old province of Japan
- Japanese battleship Hyūga, a battleship of the Imperial Japanese Navy
- Hyūga class helicopter destroyer, a helicopter carrier of the Japanese Maritime Self Defense Force
  - JDS Hyūga (DDH-181), the lead ship of the class
- Hyūga Station, a train station in Chiba Prefecture, Japan

== People with the given name ==
- Hyuga Watanabe (渡辺 陽向, born 1994), Japanese motorcycle racer

== Fictional characters ==
=== Given name ===
- Hyuuga/Bull Black, a character from Seijuu Sentai Gingaman

=== Surname ===
- Junpei Hyuuga, a character in the anime Kuroko's Basketball
- Major Hyuuga, a character in the anime 07-Ghost
- Makoto Hyuga from Neon Genesis Evangelion franchise
- Mayuki Hyuuga, the protagonist in the manga and anime series Fantastic Detective Labyrinth
- Saki Hyuuga, protagonist of Futari wa Pretty Cure Splash Star
- Yuri Hyuga, a character in the Shadow Hearts Universe
- Hyūga clan members in the popular manga Naruto
- Hyūga Kojirō from the anime/manga Captain Tsubasa
