= Fukutawara Station =

Railway station in Tōgane, Chiba Prefecture, Japan

Fukutawara Station 福俵駅
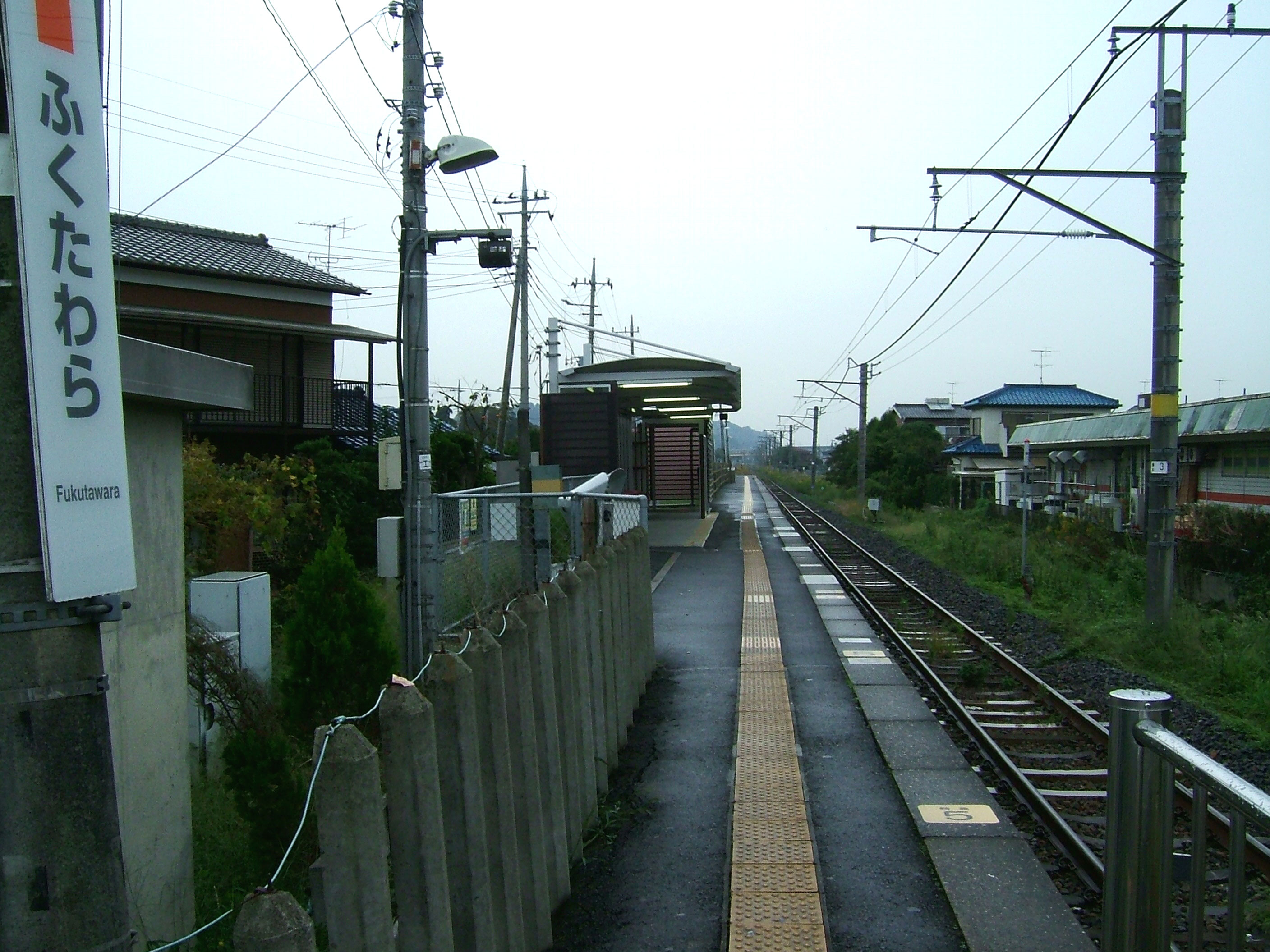
- Platform of Fukutuwara Station in October 2008

General information
- Location: Fukutawara 62, Tōgane-shi, Chiba-ken 283-0812; Japan
- Coordinates: 35.5463°N 140.3419°E
- Operator: JR East
- Line: ■ Tōgane Line
- Distance: 3.8 km from Ōami
- Platforms: 1 side platform

Other information
- Status: Unstaffed
- Website: Official website

History
- Opened: March 1, 1938
- Closed: 1941-1954

Passengers
- FY2006: 578 daily

Services
| Preceding station | JR East | Following station |
|---|---|---|
| Ōami Terminus | Tōgane Line | Tōgane towards Narutō |
Location
- Location within Chiba Prefecture Location within Japan

Fukutawara Station (福俵駅, Fukutawara-eki) is a passenger railway station in the city of Tōgane, Chiba Japan, operated by the East Japan Railway Company (JR East).

== Lines ==
Fukutawara Station is served by the Tōgane Line between Ōami and Narutō, and is located 3.8 kilometers from the terminus of the line at Ōami Station.

== Station layout ==
The station consists of a single side platform serving bidirectional traffic. There is a rain shelter built on the platform, but no station building. The platform is short, and can only handle trains up to six cars long. The station is unattended.

== History ==
Fukutawara Station opened on March 1, 1938, as a station on the Japanese Government Railways (JGR). It was closed from August 10, 1941, to October 1, 1954. The station was absorbed into the JR East network upon the privatization of JNR on April 1, 1987.

== Passenger statistics ==
In fiscal 2006, the station was used by an average of 578 passengers daily (boarding passengers only).

== Surrounding area ==
- National Route 126
- National Route 128

== See also ==
- List of railway stations in Japan
