= Josai International University =

Japanese private university

Jōsai International University
- 城西国際大学; Jōsai Kokusai Daigaku
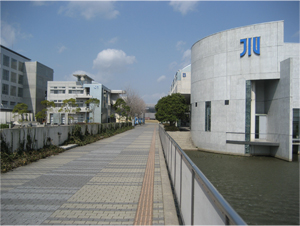
- Jōsai International University, Tōgane Campus
- Type: Private
- Established: 1992
- President: Noriko Mizuta
- Location: Tōgane, Chiba Prefecture, Japan; 35.582°N 140.392°E
- Campus: Chiba Tōgane Campus (Tōgane, Chiba Prefecture) Tokyo Kioichō Campus (Chiyoda, Tokyo) Awa Campus (Kamogawa, Chiba Prefecture) Makuhari Campus (City of Chiba, Chiba Prefecture)
- Website: www.jiu.ac.jp/englishsite/

Josai International University (城西国際大学, Jōsai kokusai daigaku), JIU, is a private university established in 1992, with two campuses, one in Tōgane, Chiba Prefecture, Japan, and one in Kioi-chō, Chiyoda-ku, and a smaller learning center in Awa Kamogawa.

Undergraduate programs include International Humanities, Japanese Language, Management and Information Science, Media Studies, Nursing, Pharmaceutical Sciences, Social and Environmental Studies, Social Work Studies, and Tourism. Graduate programs offer degrees in Humanities (M.A. in Women's Studies / Inter-Cultural Studies / Global Communication; Ph.D. in Comparative Cultures), Management and Information Sciences (MBA and Ph.D. in Management of Entrepreneurial Ventures), Social Work (M.A. in Social Welfare), Business Design (MBA in Business Design), and Pharmaceutical Science (Doctor of Pharmacology).
