= Hoki Museum =

Art museum in Chiba, Japan

Coordinates: 35°31′19.5″N 140°16′47.5″E

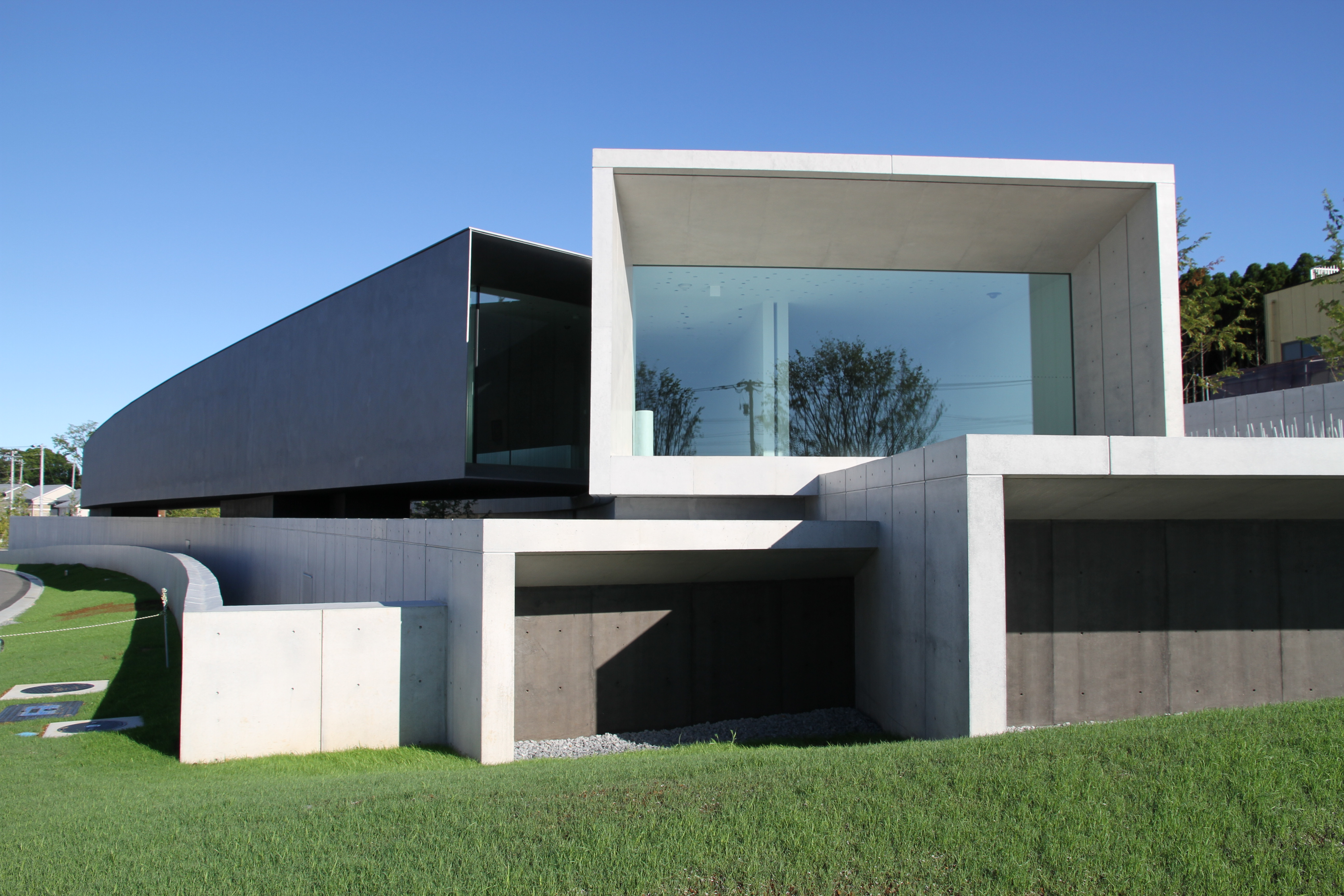
Hoki Museum, in Chiba

Hoki Museum (ホキ美術館, Hoki Bijutsukan) is located in Midori-ku, Chiba, Japan. It opened on 3 November 2010 and is the country's first museum dedicated to Realist painting. The collection of over three hundred works includes pieces by Morimoto Sōsuke (森本草介), Noda Hiroshi (野田弘志), Aoki Toshiro (青木敏郎), Isoe Tsuyoshi (磯江毅) and Masayuki Hara. Tomohiko Yamanashi & Taro Nakamoto (Nikken Sekkei） were the architects.

== See also ==
- Toke Station
