= Tōgane Line =

Railway line in Chiba prefecture, Japan

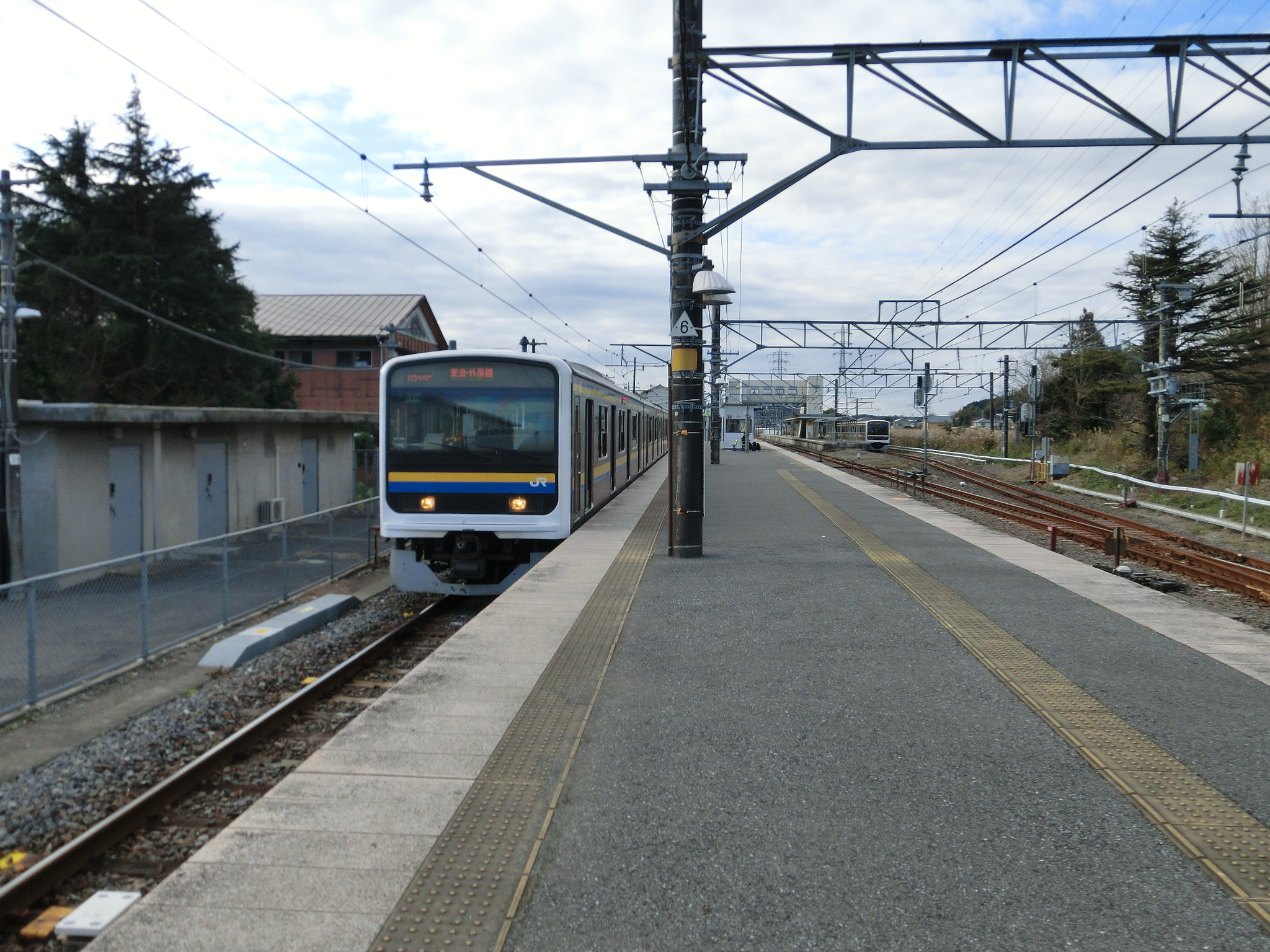
- 209 series EMU at Ōami Station

Overview
- Locale: Chiba Prefecture
- Termini: Ōami; Narutō
- Stations: 5

Service
- Operator: JR East

History
- Opened: June 30, 1900; 126 years ago

Technical
- Line length: 13.8 km (8.6 mi)
- Track gauge: 1,067 mm (3 ft 6 in)
- Electrification: 1,500 V DC overhead catenary
- Operating speed: 95 km/h (60 mph)
Route map

The Tōgane Line (東金線, Tōgane-sen) is a railway line in Chiba Prefecture, Japan, owned and operated by East Japan Railway Company (JR East). It connects Ōami Station in the city of Ōamishirasato and Narutō Station in the city of Sanmu.

== Services ==
Some trains run from Ōami to Narutō (In Japanese is 成東(Kanji),なるとう(Hiragana)), and some run through to/from Chiba Station via the Sotobō Line. Every morning, a Local train runs from Narutō to Tokyo Station via the Sotobō and Keiyō lines. Every evening, a Local train runs from Tokyo to Narutō via the same route as the one in the morning. As of 16 March 2024, all Commuter Rapid and Rapid services operating through to/from the Keiyō Line were replaced by Local trains.

== Station list ==
- All stations are located in Chiba Prefecture.
- Trains can pass each other at stations marked "◇", "∨", "∧"; they cannot pass each other at stations marked "｜".

Station	Japanese	Distance (km)		Transfers	Track	Location
Station	Japanese	Between stations	Total	Transfers	Track	Location
Ōami	大網	-	0.0	Sotobō Line (some trains through to Soga and Tokyo)	v	Ōamishirasato
Fukutawara	福俵	3.8	3.8		｜	Tōgane
Tōgane	東金	2.0	5.8		◇	Tōgane
Gumyō	求名	3.8	9.6		◇	Tōgane
Narutō	成東	4.2	13.8	Sōbu Main Line	^	Sanmu

== Rolling stock ==
- 209-2000/2100 series EMUs
- E233-5000 series 4-car EMUs (Keiyō Line through services)

=== Past ===
- 113 series EMUs
- 211 series EMUs

== History ==
The Boso Railway Co. opened the Oami - Togane section in 1900, and was nationalised in 1907.

JGR opened the Togane - Naruto section in 1911.

The line was electrified (at 1,500 V DC overhead) from 1 October 1973, CTC signalling was commissioned the following year, and freight services ceased in 1999.

=== Former connecting lines ===
- Togane station - The Kujukuri Railway Co. operated a 9 km (5.6 mi) 762 mm (2 ft 6 in) gauge line to Kazusa Katakai between 1926 and 1961.
