= Ōamishirasato =

Ōamishirasato 大網白里市
- City
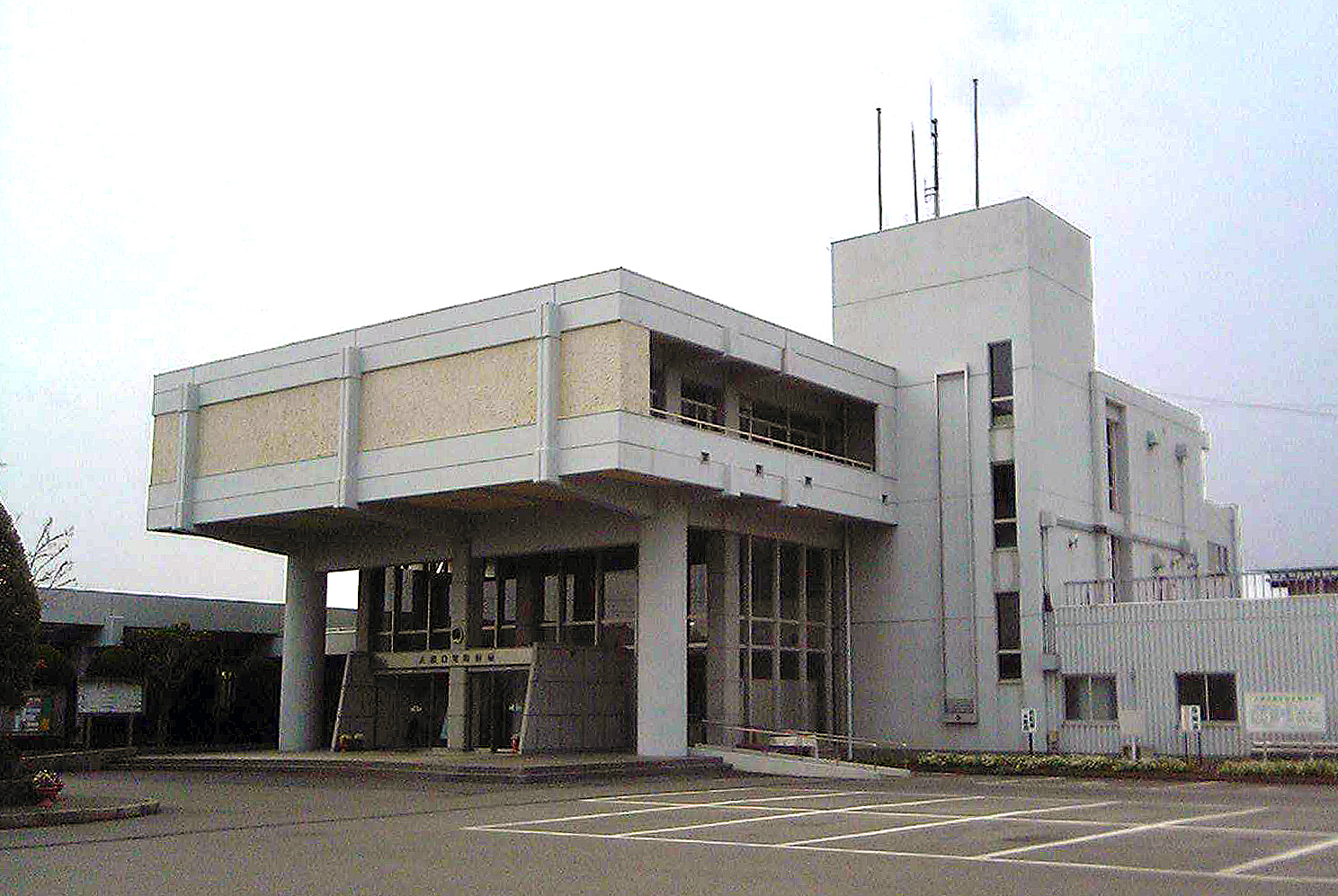
- Ōamishirasato City Hall

- Flag Seal

- Location of Ōamishirasato in Chiba Prefecture

- Coordinates: 35°31′N 140°19′E
- Country: Japan
- Region: Kantō
- Prefecture: Chiba

Area
  - Total: 58.06 km^{2} (22.42 sq mi)

Population (November 2020)
  - Total: 49,019
  - Density: 844.3/km^{2} (2,187/sq mi)
- Time zone: UTC+9 (Japan Standard Time)
- Tree: Osmanthus
- Flower: Cosmos (plant)
- Phone number: 0475-70-0300
- Address: 115-2 Ōami, Ōamishirasato-shi, Chiba-ken 299-3292
- Website: Official website

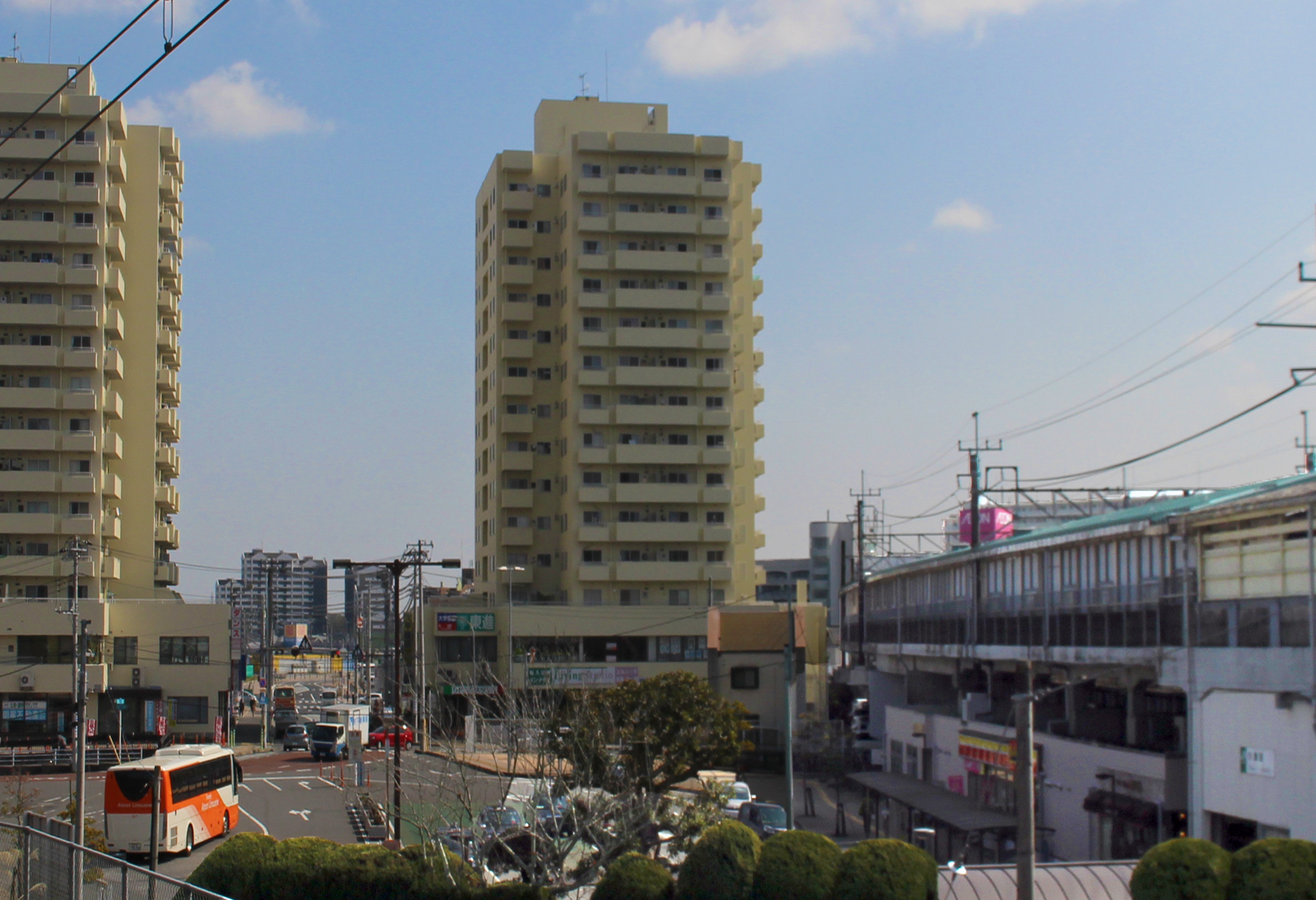
Area around Ōami Station

Ōamishirasato (大網白里市, Ōamishirasato-shi; Japanese pronunciation: [ò̞ó̞.ä́.mʲí.ɕí.ɾä́.sä̀.tò̞, -sä́.tó̞.ɕì, ó̞ó̞-]) is a city located in Chiba Prefecture, Japan. As of 1 November 2020, the city had an estimated population of 49,019 in 21,860 households and a population density of 840 persons per km^{2}. The total area of the city is 58.06 square kilometres (22.42 sq mi).

== Geography ==
Ōamishirasato is located in central Chiba prefecture, approximately 50 to 60 kilometers from the center of Tokyo. The city area is long and narrow from east to west. In the west is the hilly "Oami district", in the center is the agricultural "Masuho district" and in the east, facing the Pacific Ocean is the "Shirasato district". The city is in the southwestern part of Kujukuri Plain and is part of the Kujūkuri beach region.

=== Surrounding municipalities ===
Chiba Prefecture

- Kujūkuri
- Midori-ku
- Mobara
- Shirako
- Tōgane

=== Climate ===
Ōamishirasato has a humid subtropical climate (Köppen Cfa) characterized by warm summers and cool winters with light to no snowfall. The average annual temperature in Ōamishirasato is 15.2 °C. The average annual rainfall is 1581 mm with September as the wettest month. The temperatures are highest on average in August, at around 26.2 °C, and lowest in January, at around 5.3 °C.

== Demographics ==
Per Japanese census data, the population of Ōamishirasato has recently plateaued after a long period of growth.

Historical population
Year	Pop.	±%
1970	22,789	—
1980	25,478	+11.8%
1990	32,742	+28.5%
2000	48,051	+46.8%
2010	50,113	+4.3%
2020	48,129	−4.0%

== History ==
Ōami Town and Shirasato Village were created during the organization of Sanbu District within Chiba Prefecture with the establishment of the modern municipalities system on April 1, 1889. Shirasato was elevated to town status on August 10, 1935. Ōami Town expanded through the annexation of neighboring villages of Yamane and Mizuho on April 1, 1951. Ōami and Shirasato Towns and Masuho Village were merged to create Ōamishirasato Town on December 1, 1954. The town annexed a portion of Honnō Town in a boundary adjustment of November 1, 1957. Ōamishirasato was elevated to city status on January 1, 2013.

== Government ==
Ōamishirasato has a mayor-council form of government with a directly elected mayor and a unicameral city council of 18 members. Ōamishirasato contributes one member to the Chiba Prefectural Assembly. In terms of national politics, the city is part of Chiba 11th district of the lower house of the Diet of Japan.

== Economy ==
Ōamishirasato is a regional commercial center, and a bedroom community for the nearby metropolis of Chiba. Per the fiscal 2010 census, the commuting rate is 18.8% for Chiba and 11.7% for Tokyo.

== Education ==
Ōamishirasato has seven public elementary schools and three public middle schools operated by the city government, and one public high school operated by the Chiba Prefectural Board of Education.

== Transportation ==
=== Railway ===
JR East – Sotobō Line

- Ōami - Nagata

JR East – Tōgane Line

- Ōami

=== Highway ===
- Ken-Ō Expressway – Ōamishirasato Smart Interchange
- National Route 128
- National Route 409

== Sister cities ==
- (Japan) Nakanojō, Gunma, since February 1979

== Noted people from Ōamishirasato ==
- Misaki Doi, professional tennis player
- Aya Miyama, women's professional soccer player
