= Masayuki Hara =

Japanese realist painter (born 1956)

- 原 雅幸
- Born: 1956 (age 69–70); Osaka Prefecture Japan
- Notable work: • The Shining Sea • Autumn Resonance • Landscape with Jizō Hall • Christopher Robin’s Voice • Montepulciano • Thin Ice Day • Angelica in Winter
- Movement: Realism
- Awards: Selected for the Yasui Prize Exhibition in 1982 and 1985
- Website: masayukihara.com

Masayuki Hara (born in 1956) is a Japanese realist painter from Osaka Prefecture.

== Early life ==
Born in Osaka Prefecture, Hara graduated from Tama Art University in 1979 and held numerous solo exhibitions at Iida Gallery in Ginza. His graduation work, Rainy Mountain, was sold early through the gallery.

== Art career ==
In his early career, Hara focused on the satoyama (woodlands), rural fields, and coastal areas of southern Osaka. He was selected for the Yasui Award Exhibition in 1982 and 1985.

His first art book, Selected Works of Contemporary Painter Masayuki Hara (Koshinsha), was published in 1981, followed by Masayuki Hara Art Collection (Kyuryudo Graphics) in 1987.

In 1986 and 1988, Hara held solo exhibitions at the Hammer Galleries in New York, founded in 1928, gaining international recognition. Curator Alexandra R. Murphy praised his work as “transcending realism to capture the eternal mysteries of the Earth in a single moment”. Renowned American realist Andrew Wyeth (1917–2009) also lauded Hara, saying, “This young man has a remarkable eye”.

In 1994, Hara exhibited at the Nara Prefectural Museum of Art’s Realism in Contemporary Oil Painting exhibition. He participated in TIAF’97 in 1997 (Iida Bijutsu).

In 1998, Hara moved to the United Kingdom, settling in Edinburgh, Scotland in 2005, where he continued to paint landscapes of the British Isles.

Around 2008, Hara began receiving support from Masao Hoki, president of Hogy Medical and founder of the Hoki Museum (d. 2021). Many of Hara’s large-scale works, including pieces over 100 F-size, are now part of the museum’s collection.

Since the museum’s opening in 2010, a boom in realist painting has emerged in Japan, with Hara’s works receiving high acclaim from the outset.

In 2012, Hara participated in a three-person exhibition at The Scottish Gallery in Edinburgh, established in 1842. He has continued to exhibit internationally, including in Spain.

In 2025, Hara returned to Japan.

== As an artist ==
=== Artistic Philosophy ===
Masayuki Hara seeks to evoke a resonance of memory between his paintings and viewers by depicting familiar, everyday landscapes as meaningful scenes. Through this approach, he transforms ordinary surroundings into emotionally charged visual experiences. His realist style emphasizes empathy, inviting viewers to lose track of time and immerse themselves fully in the world of the painting.

Hara's works are known to evoke a sense of déjà vu in viewers. This sensation, when associated with pleasant memories from the past, is believed to help viewers recall their own experiences more vividly and warmly, potentially providing psychological comfort and a sense of tranquility.

=== Artistic Origins ===
Hara’s artistic roots lie in the southern region of Osaka Prefecture. The rural landscape, with a distant view of the shimmering Osaka Bay, is captured in his work Hikaru Umi ("Shining Sea") with a perfectly balanced composition. Turning 180 degrees from this vantage point reveals the scenery of Ameyama, the subject of his graduation project. These two landscapes together form the foundation of Hara’s creative vision and remain treasured sources of inspiration.

=== Fieldwork ===
During his career in Osaka, Hara conducted fieldwork almost daily in search of subjects for his paintings. These outings typically took place from around 3 p.m. until evening, when the unobstructed golden light streaming in from the Seto Inland Sea contributed to the creation of many notable works. Particularly in late summer, the unique quality of the light—characterized by the elongation of shadows over time—served as a key factor in selecting locations for observation and sketching.

=== Composition Technique ===
Hara consistently employs compositional principles based on the golden ratio to reconstruct the inherent beauty of memorable landscapes in his paintings. By drawing arcs from each corner of the canvas and segmenting the pictorial space with curved lines, he arranges multiple visual elements in harmonious balance. This method has remained a defining feature of his work from his earliest period to the present, contributing to the distinctive structure and spatial resonance of his compositions.

Hara's landscapes are characterized by delicate depictions of scenes drawn from memory, rendered with a subtle atmospheric quality. His compositions are noted for their balance, with each element within the frame arranged to leave a distinct impression on the viewer. This approach often evokes a sense of immersion and déjà vu, resonating with the viewer's own memories and emotions. Such qualities are considered among the reasons for the broad appeal of Hara's work across diverse audiences.

=== Use of Perspective ===
Hara skillfully employs linear perspective to create a compelling sense of spatial immersion, drawing the viewer into the pictorial space. His compositions are distinguished by the manipulation of light and shadow, which guide the gaze toward the depth of the canvas. In his depiction of a sheep farm in Hartsop, Hara elaborates on the effects of perspective. The stone fence, piled to separate the flock, functions as a visual line that leads the viewer’s eye into the distance, thereby enhancing the sense of depth within the frame. Additionally, the slanting afternoon light casts shadows across the sheep and pasture, and these shadows operate as structural elements within a sun-centered perspective system. Together, they reinforce the directional flow of the viewer’s gaze toward the background of the scene.

=== Representation of Temporal Flow ===
In Hara’s paintings, natural phenomena such as drifting clouds and rippling water are rendered with a dynamic quality, despite the static nature of the medium. His works evoke the impression of an alternate dimension within the frame—one in which time flows differently from that of the real world. This effect is achieved through Hara’s precise understanding of natural principles, including the movement of air and the shifting of light, which he translates into meticulous visual detail. As a result, viewers often perceive the presence of a parallel world within the artwork, where a distinct temporal axis seems to unfold independently of everyday reality.

== Reception ==
Art critics in Japan and abroad have written extensively about Hara’s landscape paintings, often emphasizing his technical precision, emotional restraint, and the contemplative atmosphere of his work.

Yoko Mori (born 1936), Professor Emerita at Meiji University and a specialist in Western art history, is widely recognized as a leading scholar on the sixteenth‑century Netherlandish painter Pieter Bruegel. Mori has drawn attention to Hara’s distinctive technique, characterized by exceptionally detailed rendering that extends from individual blades of grass to single grains of sand. Although such meticulous depiction can at times become an arduous process for an artist, Mori notes that no sense of struggle is evident in Hara’s work; instead, she argues that his paintings convey a powerful sense of reverence for nature.
In his biography of Bruegel, Karel van Mander praised the painter by writing that “Nature chose this artist from among humankind and had him depict her.” Mori invokes this assessment and suggests that, through Hara’s work, the natural landscapes of the United Kingdom may be newly rediscovered.

In the catalogue for Hara’s second solo exhibition at Hammer Galleries in New York (1988), art historian Nicholas Fox Weber described Hara as an artist of “rare virtuosity and remarkable control.” Weber noted that Hara’s landscapes avoid depictions of violence or disorder, instead presenting scenes in which natural elements—clouds, rocks, forests, and mountains—retain a calm, ordered presence. According to Weber, even when Hara depicts aging faces, decaying leaves, or peeling paint, these details appear within a larger sense of harmony rather than destruction. Weber compared Hara’s sensitivity to light, water, and atmosphere to Leo Tolstoy’s belief that art should “cause violence to be set aside,” arguing that Hara’s paintings embody this ideal through their clarity, emotional balance, and quiet energy.

In her essay for Hara’s first Hammer Galleries exhibition catalogue (1986), Alexandra R. Murphy, Curator of Paintings at the Sterling and Francine Clark Art Institute, wrote that Hara’s landscapes achieve a distinctive balance between the specificity of identifiable Japanese sites and the universal qualities of landscape form. She emphasized his combination of subtle coloration and highly disciplined draftsmanship—skills she noted are rarely applied with such rigor in contemporary landscape painting. Murphy compared Hara’s meticulous attention to detail to early European masters such as the van Eyck brothers and Bellini, arguing that his work restores a sense of material presence to landscape painting. She highlighted his ability to convey both vast atmospheric spaces and intimate natural details, concluding that Hara’s paintings “transcend their own realism” by uniting the particular and the universal.

Japanese art critic Masao Murase (1939–2013), who followed Masayuki Hara’s work from the time of his graduation project, consistently highlighted the distinct position of Hara’s oil painting within the history of modern Japanese Western-style painting. In essays contributed to both early and later monographs on Hara, Murase noted that the artist’s oil paintings lacked the heavy, oily quality often associated with Western-style painting, instead conveying an emotional atmosphere rooted in the Japanese landscape. Murase argued that Hara’s rendering of delicate, humid light and air recalled aspects of nihonga sensibilities found in the work of Kawai Gyokudō.

Murase further emphasized Hara’s use of extremely fine brushes to achieve meticulous detail, capturing everything from minute landscape elements to the texture of the surrounding air. He regarded this level of precision as unprecedented in Japanese oil painting. Discussing an untitled landscape painted in 1979, Murase praised the work for encapsulating the atmosphere and lived experience of its time, situating Hara’s approach within a lineage extending back to early yōga painters such as Takahashi Yuichi. He also suggested that Hara’s realist landscapes resonated with classical traditions associated with artists like Vermeer and Corot, indicating what he viewed as a new direction in Japanese oil painting.
According to Murase, Hara’s practice was grounded in a “keen observational eye” that captured subjects exactly as they appeared. Although Hara often depicted seemingly ordinary or commonplace motifs, he avoided symbols of modernization such as new housing developments or factories. Instead, he repeatedly turned to scenes of “things in decline,” including driftwood on reclaimed land, weathered mountain passes, and snow-covered abandoned houses. Murase argued that this perspective allowed Hara’s landscapes to express the pathos and temporal depth embedded in the Japanese environment. In later publications, Murase reiterated that Hara’s clear and exacting style had few precedents in Japanese oil painting, praising his ability to depict seasonal transitions, light, mist, and snow. He concluded that Hara’s sensitivity to themes of impermanence and the passage of time was a defining characteristic of his work.

Art historian and critic Kunio Motoe (1948–2019), writing on the occasion of the exhibition Masayuki Hara: Forty Years of Painting, offered an assessment of the works produced during Hara’s period in Edinburgh. Motoe observed that Hara’s paintings emphasized the physical presence of natural elements—clouds, trees, and earth—prior to their conceptualization as “landscape.” He regarded this direct and forceful sense of presence as a quality achieved by few painters. Motoe also noted that the surfaces of Hara’s paintings appeared more solid and austere when viewed in person than expected from reproductions. He suggested that, because Japanese viewers often associate landscape with familiar surroundings, the material strength of Hara’s images could be overlooked, whereas in Western art history the landscape has long been treated as an autonomous subject.

Motoe further remarked that Hara approached landscape painting by placing himself within the environment and treating himself as part of the subject. This stance, he argued, enabled Hara to reconstruct the landscape without relying on decorative composition, resulting in the robust pictorial surfaces characteristic of his work. For these reasons, Motoe described Hara as a “thorough landscape painter.”

== Notable works ==
=== Landscapes of Japan ===
・The Shining Sea, Size 100 (Collection of Hoki Museum)
・Ameyama, Size 120 (Private collection)
・Fog and Lingering Snow, Size 100 (Collection of Niigata Prefectural Museum of Modern Art and Niigata Bandaijima Art Museum)
・Winter Landscape, Size 60 (Collection of Fukui Fine Arts Museum)
・Abandoned Ship, Size 50 (Collection of Fukui Fine Arts Museum)
・Group Portrait, Size 50 (Private collection)
・Autumn Resonance, Size 187×552cm (Private collection)
・Pond, Size 30 (Private collection)
・Shade of Trees, Size 30 (Private collection)
・Highland Pasture, Size 12 (Private collection)
・Landscape with Jizō Hall, Size 20 (Private collection)
・Harbor of Wooden Boats, Size 20 (Collection of Hoki Museum)

=== Landscapes Abroad ===
・Manor House, Size 30 (Collection of Hoki Museum)
・Christopher Robin’s Voice, Size 12 (Collection of Hoki Museum)
・Montepulciano, Size 120 (Collection of Hoki Museum)
・Thin Ice Day, Size 100 (Collection of Hoki Museum)
・Shining River in Malham, Size 30 (Collection of Hoki Museum)
・Angelica in Winter, Size 100 (Collection of Hoki Museum)
・Sheep Pasture in Hartsop, Size 100 (Collection of Hoki Museum)
・The Boathouse in Narrow Canal, Size 12 (Private collection)
・Three Boats, Size 12 (Private collection)
