= Toke Station =

Railway station in Chiba, Japan

Toke Station 土気駅
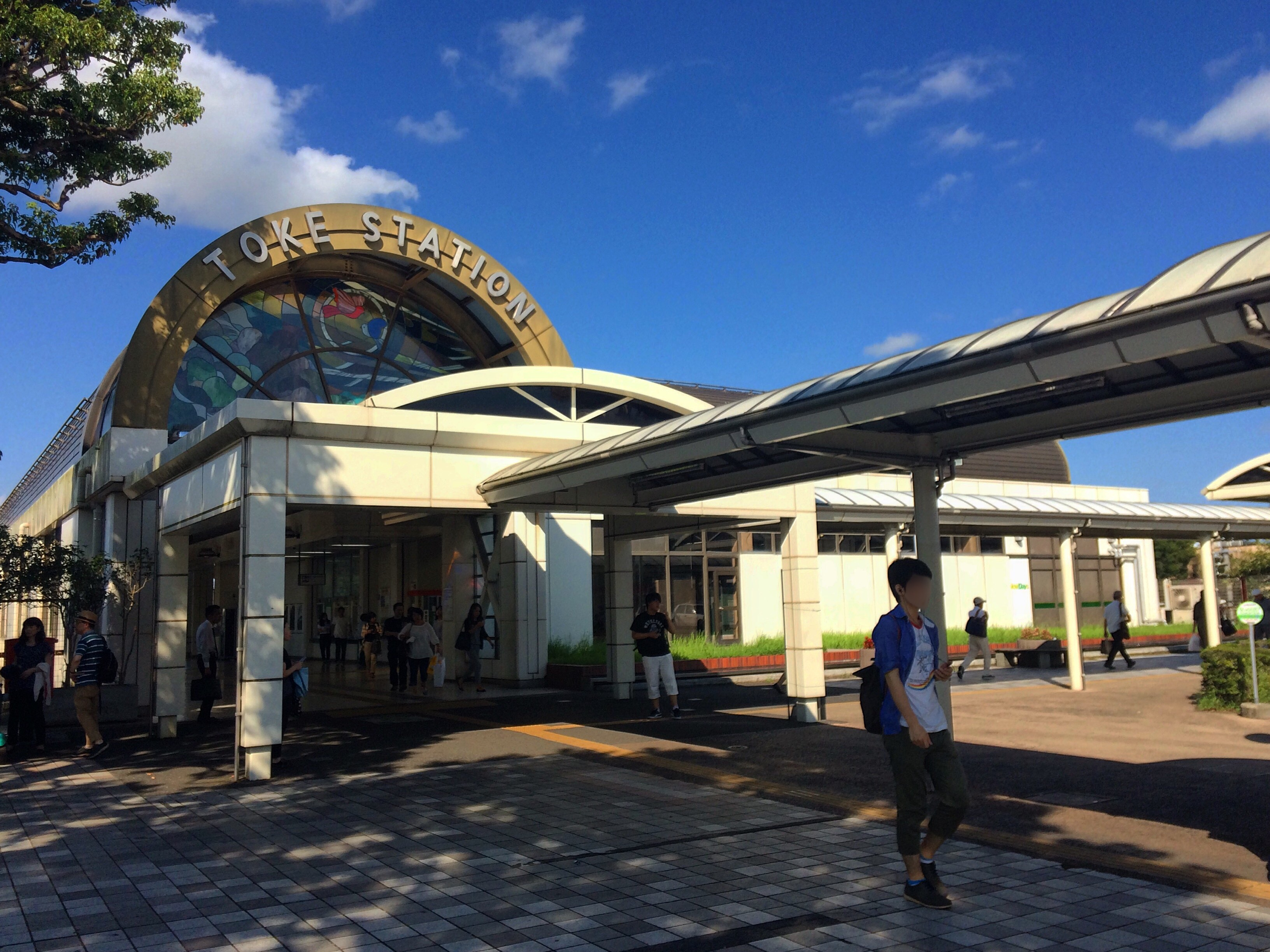
- Toke Station, September 2016

General information
- Location: 1727-1 Toke-chō, Midori-ku, Chiba-shi, Chiba-ken, 267-0061; Japan
- Coordinates: 35.5307°N 140.2699°E
- Operator: JR East
- Line: ■ Sotobō Line
- Distance: 18.1 km from Chiba
- Platforms: 1 island platform

Other information
- Status: Staffed
- Website: Official website

History
- Opened: 1 November 1896; 129 years ago

Passengers
- FY2019: 13,078

Services
Preceding station	JR East	Following station
Soga towards Tokyo	Wakashio (limited service)	Ōami towards Awa-Kamogawa
Honda towards Soga	Sotobō Line Keiyō Rapid	Ōami towards Katsuura
Honda towards Chiba	Sotobō Line Sobū Rapid	Ōami towards Kazusa-Ichinomiya
Honda towards Soga or Chiba	Sotobō Line Local	Ōami towards Awa-Kamogawa
Location
- Location within Chiba Prefecture Location within Japan

Toke Station (土気駅, Toke-eki) is a passenger railway station located in Midori-ku, Chiba, Japan operated by the East Japan Railway Company (JR East).

== Lines ==
Toke Station is served by the Sotobō Line, and is located 18.1 km (11.2 mi) from the terminus of the line at Chiba Station. Some Sotobō Line limited express Wakashio services from Tokyo to Awa-Kamogawa stop at this station.

== Station layout ==
This station consists of a single island platform, serving two tracks, with an elevated station building built over the tracks and platforms. The station is staffed.

=== Platform ===
1	■ Sotobō Line	for Ōami, Mobara, Katsuura, Awa-Kamogawa
2	■ Sotobō Line	for Soga, Chiba, and Tokyo

== History ==
Toke Station opened on 1 November 1896 as a station on the Bōsō Railway. On 1 September 1907, the Bōsō Railway was nationalized and became part of the Japanese Government Railways, which was transformed into the Japan National Railways (JNR) after World War II. Freight operations were discontinued on 1 October 1962. The station building was enlarged in January 1979, with the construction of the south exit. A new station building was completed in August 1986. The station became part of the JR East network upon privatization of the Japan National Railways (JNR) on 1 April 1987.

== Passenger statistics ==
In fiscal 2019, the station was used by an average of 13,078 passengers daily (boarding passengers only).

== Surrounding area ==
- Chiba Showa-no-mori Park
- Hoki Museum
- Toke High School
- Birds Mall
