= Nagata Station (Chiba) =

Railway station in Ōamishirasato, Chiba Prefecture, Japan

Nagata Station 永田駅
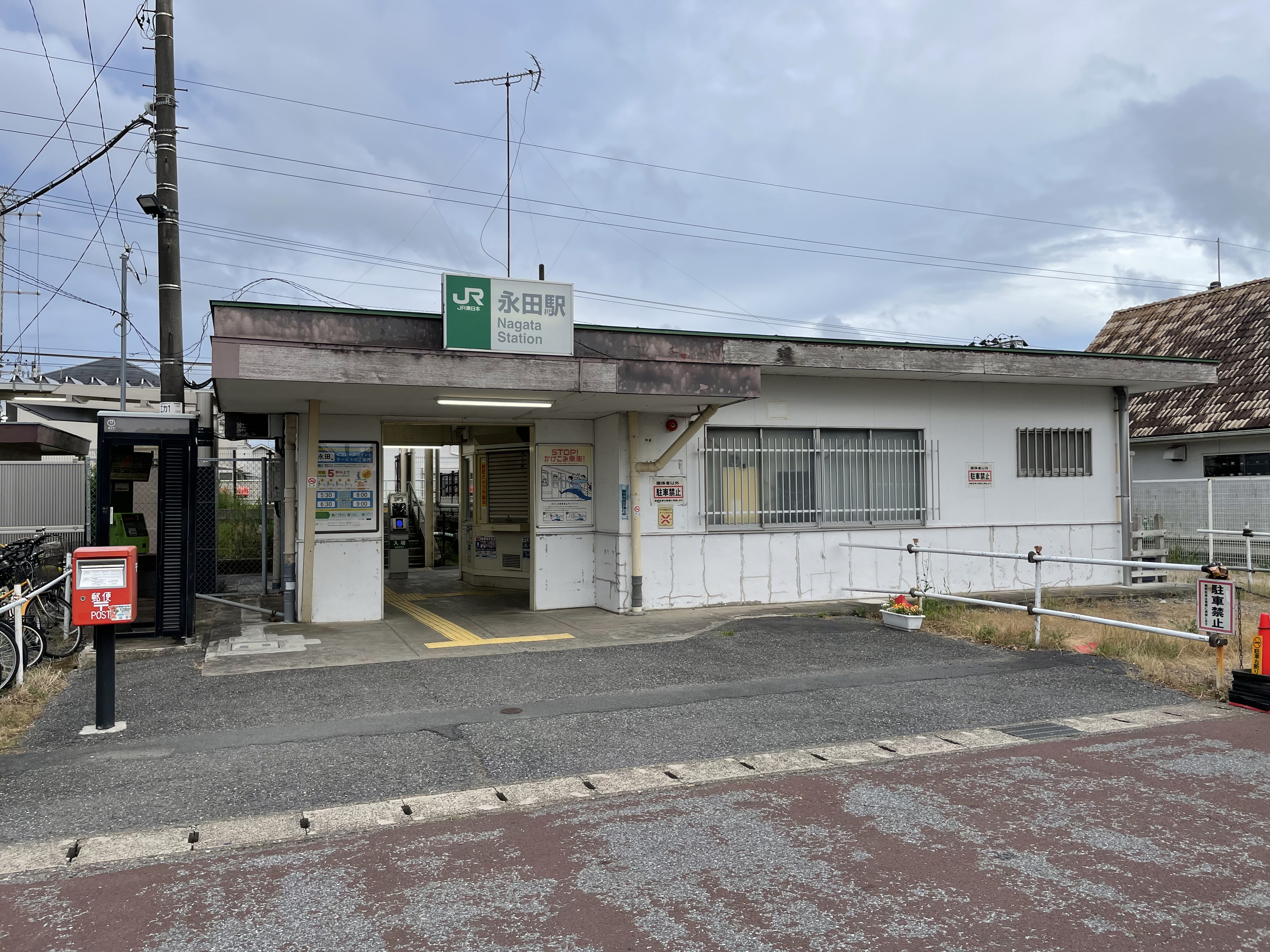
- Nagata Station in July, 2022

General information
- Location: Nagata 1835, Ōamishirasato-shi, Chiba-ken 299-3233; Japan
- Coordinates: 35°30′12.13″N 140°18′39.79″E
- Operator: JR East
- Line: ■ Sotobō Line
- Distance: 25.3 km from Chiba
- Platforms: 2 side platforms

Other information
- Status: Staffed
- Website: Official website

History
- Opened: 20 March 1959; 67 years ago

Passengers
- FY2019: 973

Services
Preceding station	JR East	Following station
Ōami towards Soga	Sotobō Line Keiyō Rapid (limited service)	Honnō (limited service) towards Katsuura
Ōami towards Soga or Chiba	Sotobō Line Local	Honnō towards Awa-Kamogawa
Location
- Location within Chiba Prefecture Location within Japan

Nagata Station (永田駅, Nagata-eki) is a passenger railway station located in the city of Ōamishirasato, Chiba Prefecture Japan, operated by the East Japan Railway Company (JR East).

== Lines ==
Nagata Station is served by the Sotobō Line, and is located 25.3 km (15.7 mi) from the official starting point of the line at Chiba Station.

== Station layout ==
Nagata Station has a two opposed side platforms connected to a one-story station building by a footbridge. Unattended for many years, the station has been attended during normal working hours since April 1996.

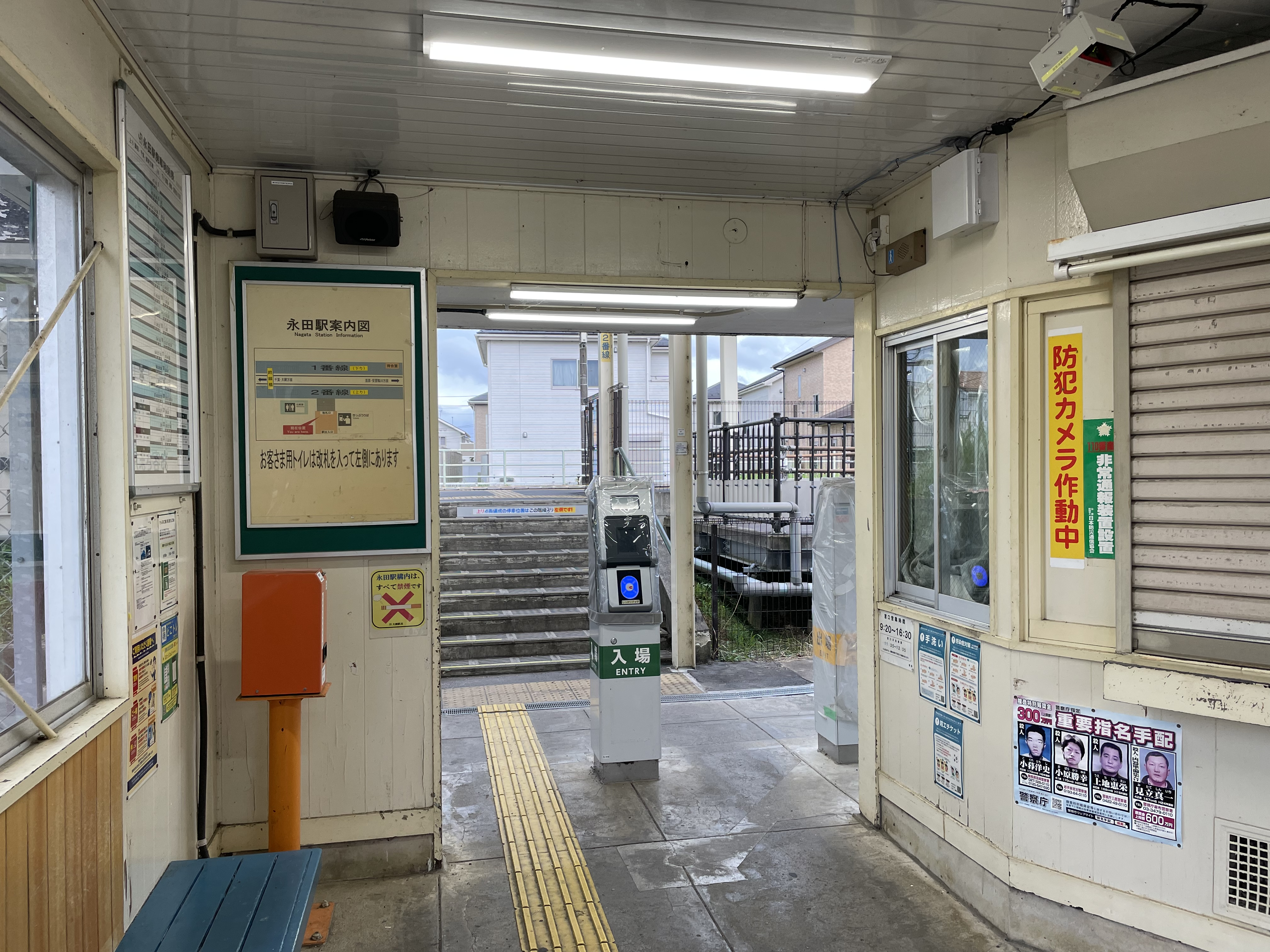
Ticket gates in July, 2022

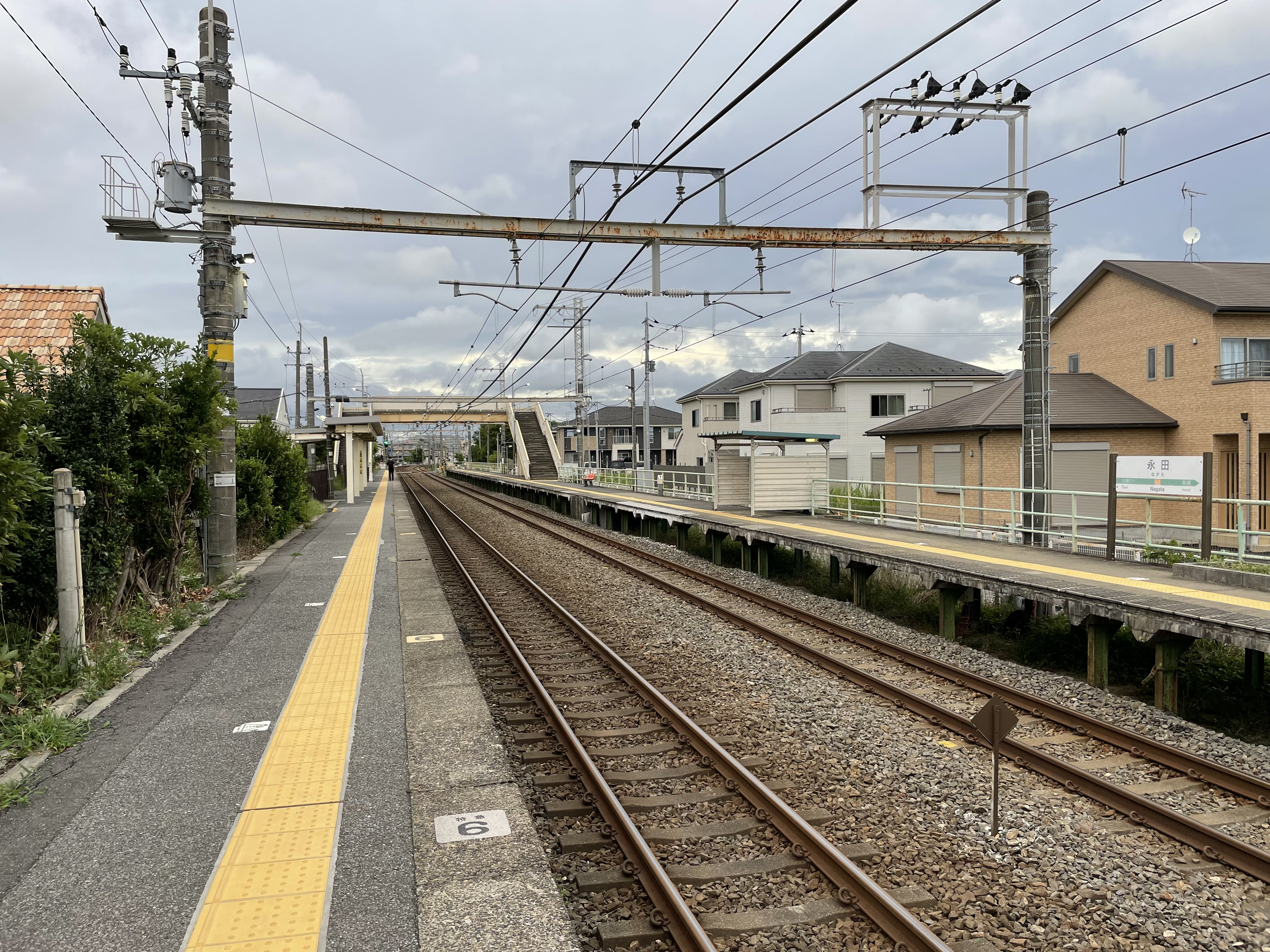
Platform in July, 2022

=== Platform ===
1	■ Sotobō Line	Ōami, Soga, Chiba
2	■ Sotobō Line	For Mobara, Kazusa-Ichinomiya, Katsuura, Awa-Kamogawa

== History ==
Nagata Station was opened on 20 March 1959 as a station on the Japan National Railways, after a petition signed by 2,470 local inhabitants. It joined the JR East network upon the privatization of the Japan National Railways (JNR) on 1 April 1987.

== Passenger statistics ==
In fiscal 2019, the station was used by an average of 973 passengers daily (boarding passengers only).

== Surrounding area ==
- National Route 128
- Mizuho Elementary School

== See also ==
- List of railway stations in Japan
