= Tōgane =

Tōgane 東金市
- City
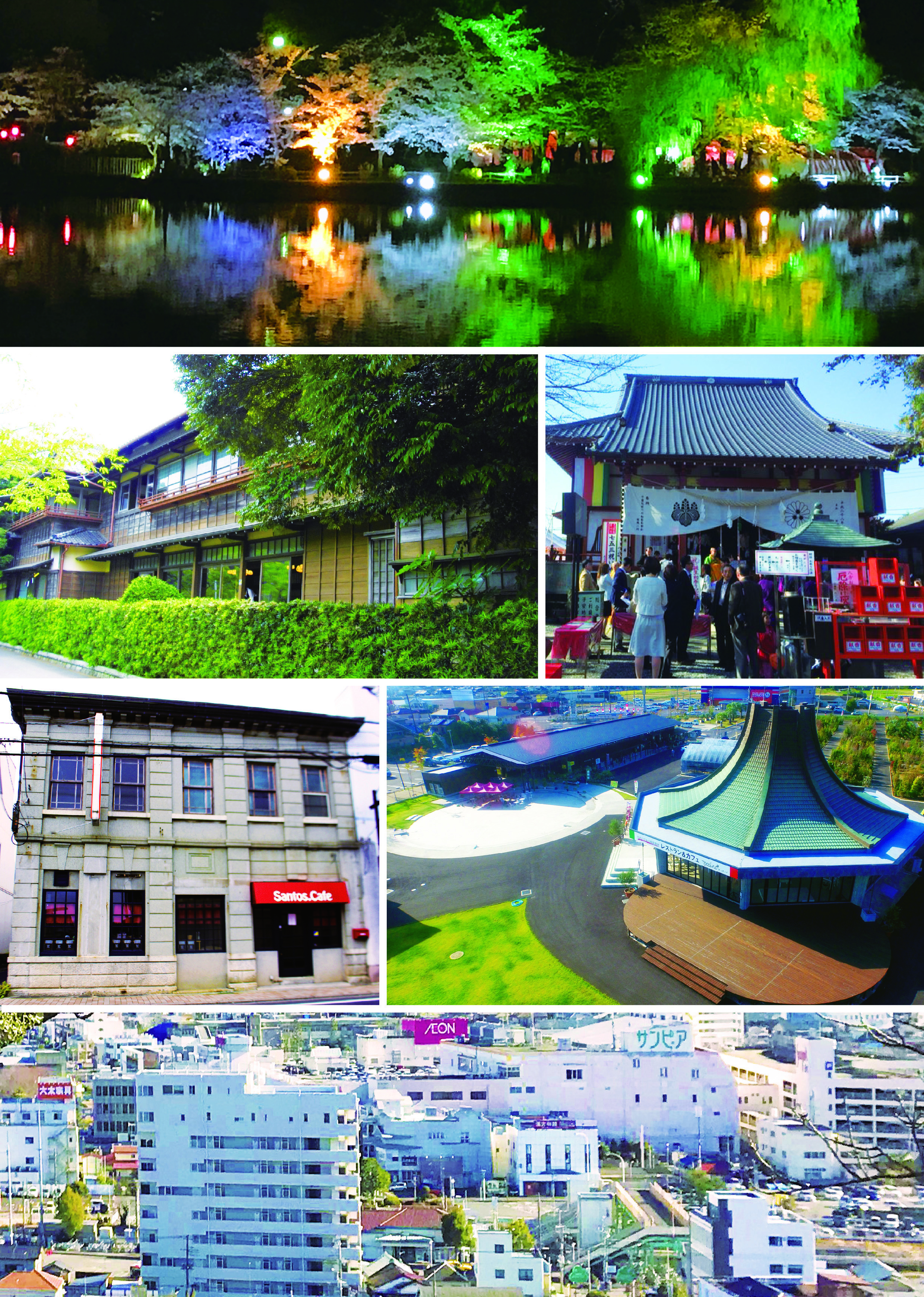
Tōgane sakura matsuri & Lake Hakkaku
Hakkaku-tei	Myosen-ji
Subaru bookstore	Minori-no-sato road station
downtown Tōgane
- Flag Coat of arms

- Location of Tōgane in Chiba Prefecture

- Location within Japan
- Coordinates: 35°33′35.8″N 140°21′57.9″E
- Country: Japan
- Region: Kantō
- Prefecture: Chiba
- First official recorded: 807 AD
- Town settled: April 1, 1889
- City settled: April 1, 1954

Government
  - Mayor: Miki Yamashita (山下美紀) - from May 2026

Area
  - Total: 89.12 km^{2} (34.41 sq mi)

Population (December 1, 2015)
  - Total: 57,780
  - Density: 648.3/km^{2} (1,679/sq mi)
- Time zone: UTC+9 (Japan Standard Time)
- Tree: Rakan Maki
- Flower: Yoshino Sakura
- Phone number: 0475(50)1111
- Address: 1-1 Higashi-Iwasaki, Tōgane-shi, Chiba-ken 283-8511
- Website: Official website

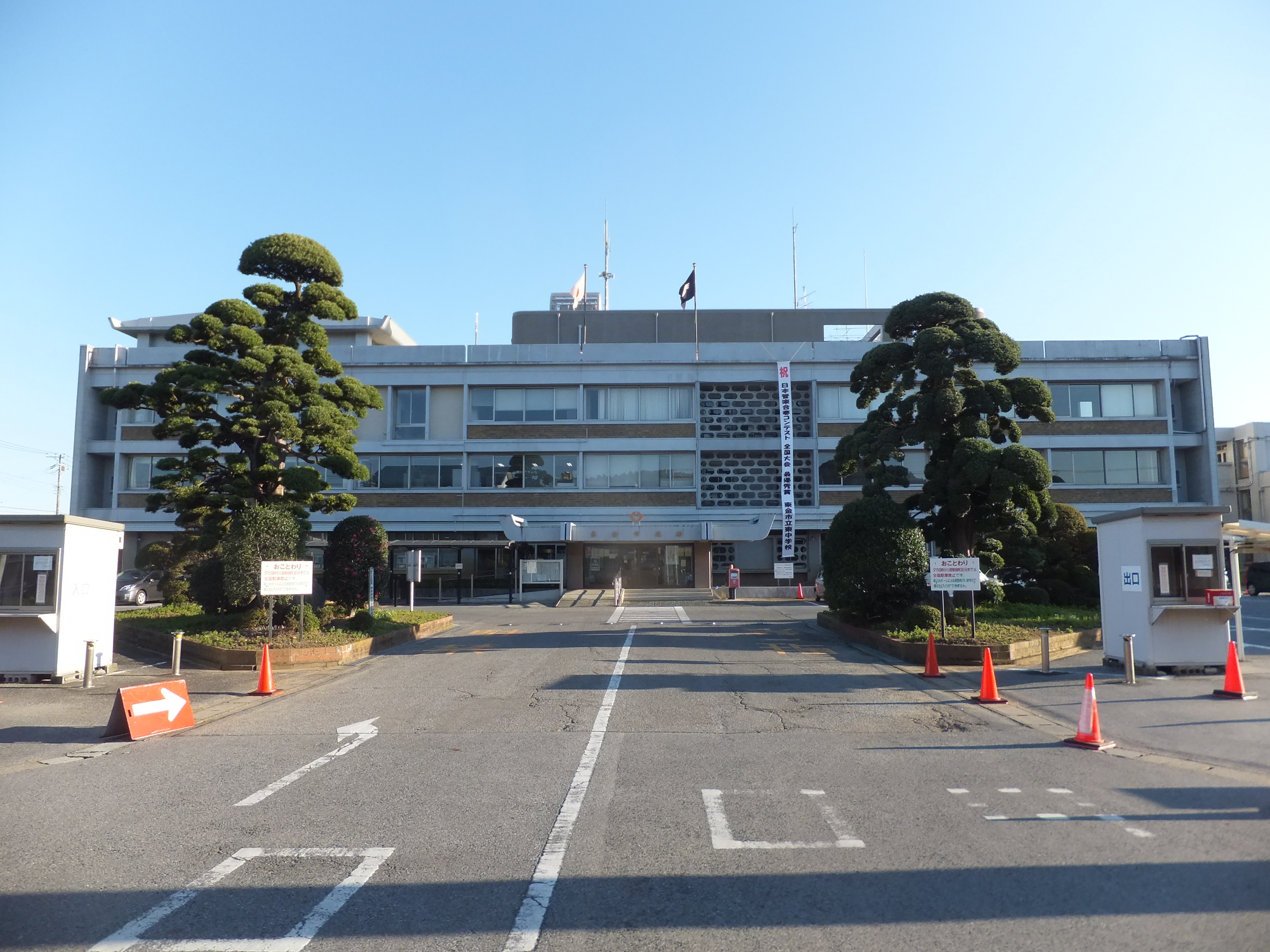
Tōgane City Hall (Dec 11, 2011)

Tōgane (東金市, Tōgane-shi) is a city located in Chiba Prefecture, Japan. As of 1 December 2020, the city had an estimated population of 57,780 in 26,907 households and a population density of 650 persons per km^{2}. The total area of the city is 89.12 square kilometres (34.41 sq mi).

Tōgane is home to the Kurenai-kai School of Japanese embroidery, which produces handmade obi and kimono in the traditional Japanese style.

== Geography ==
Tōgane is located in center-eastern Chiba Prefecture at the border of the Bōsō Hill Range. It is approximately 25 kilometers from the prefectural capital at Chiba and 50 to 60 kilometers from downtown Tokyo. The city has a number of large exclave surrounded by the city of Sanmu, and Sanmu likewise has two enclaves within with borders of the Tōgane exclave.

=== Surrounding municipalities ===
Chiba Prefecture

- Kujūkuri
- Chiba (Midori-ku, Wakaba-ku)
- Ōamishirasato
- Sanmu
- Yachimata

=== Climate ===
Tōgane has a humid subtropical climate (Köppen Cfa) characterized by warm summers and cool winters with light to no snowfall. The average annual temperature in Tōgane is 14.9 °C. The average annual rainfall is 1575 mm with September as the wettest month. The temperatures are highest on average in August, at around 25.9 °C, and lowest in January, at around 4.9 °C.

== Demographics ==
Per Japanese census data, the population of Tōgane has recently plateaued after several decades of growth.

Historical population
Year	Pop.	±%
1950	34,495	—
1960	32,826	−4.8%
1970	32,065	−2.3%
1980	35,603	+11.0%
1990	45,179	+26.9%
2000	59,605	+31.9%
2010	61,751	+3.6%
2020	58,219	−5.7%

== History ==
During the Edo Period, Tōgane was the location of a villa on Lake Hakkaku used by the Shogun Tokugawa Ieyasu and Tokugawa Hidetada for falconry. The town of Tōgane was founded on April 1, 1889, as part of Sanbe District, Chiba Prefecture with the establishment of the modern municipalities system. Sanbe District became Sanbu District on April 1, 1897. The town expanded on April 1, 1953, through annexation of the neighboring villages of Okayama, Masaki, Toyonari, Kohei and a portion of the village of Yamato. It was elevated to city status on April 1, 1954, after further expansion through annexation of parts of the neighboring villages of Hara and Fukuoka.

== Government ==
Tōgane has a mayor-council form of government with a directly elected mayor and a unicameral city council of 22 members. Tōgane contributes one member to the Chiba Prefectural Assembly. In terms of national politics, the city is part of Chiba 11th district of the lower house of the Diet of Japan.

== Economy ==
Tōgane is known for strawberry picking in February and March. Strawberries are grown in greenhouses. Because there is not much industry remaining in some rural areas of Japan like Tōgane, antique markets are gaining popularity as old farmhouses are torn down.

== Education ==
- Josai International University
- Tōgane has nine public elementary schools and four public middle schools operated by the city government, and two public high schools operated by the Chiba Prefectural Board of Education. There is also one private high school. The prefecture also operates one special education school for the handicapped.

== Transportation ==
=== Railway ===
JR East – Tōgane Line

- Fukutawara - Tōgane - Gumyō

=== Highway ===
- Ken-Ō Expressway
- Chiba-Tōgane Road
- National Route 126
- National Route 128
- National Route 409

== Sister cities ==
- Rueil-Malmaison, France, since November 7, 1970

== Noted people from Tōgane ==
- Katsuhiko Nagata, Olympic silver medalist in wrestling
- Yuji Nagata, professional wrestler
- Urara Takano, voice actress
