= Narutō Station =

Railway station in Sanmu, Chiba Prefecture, Japan

Narutō Station 成東駅
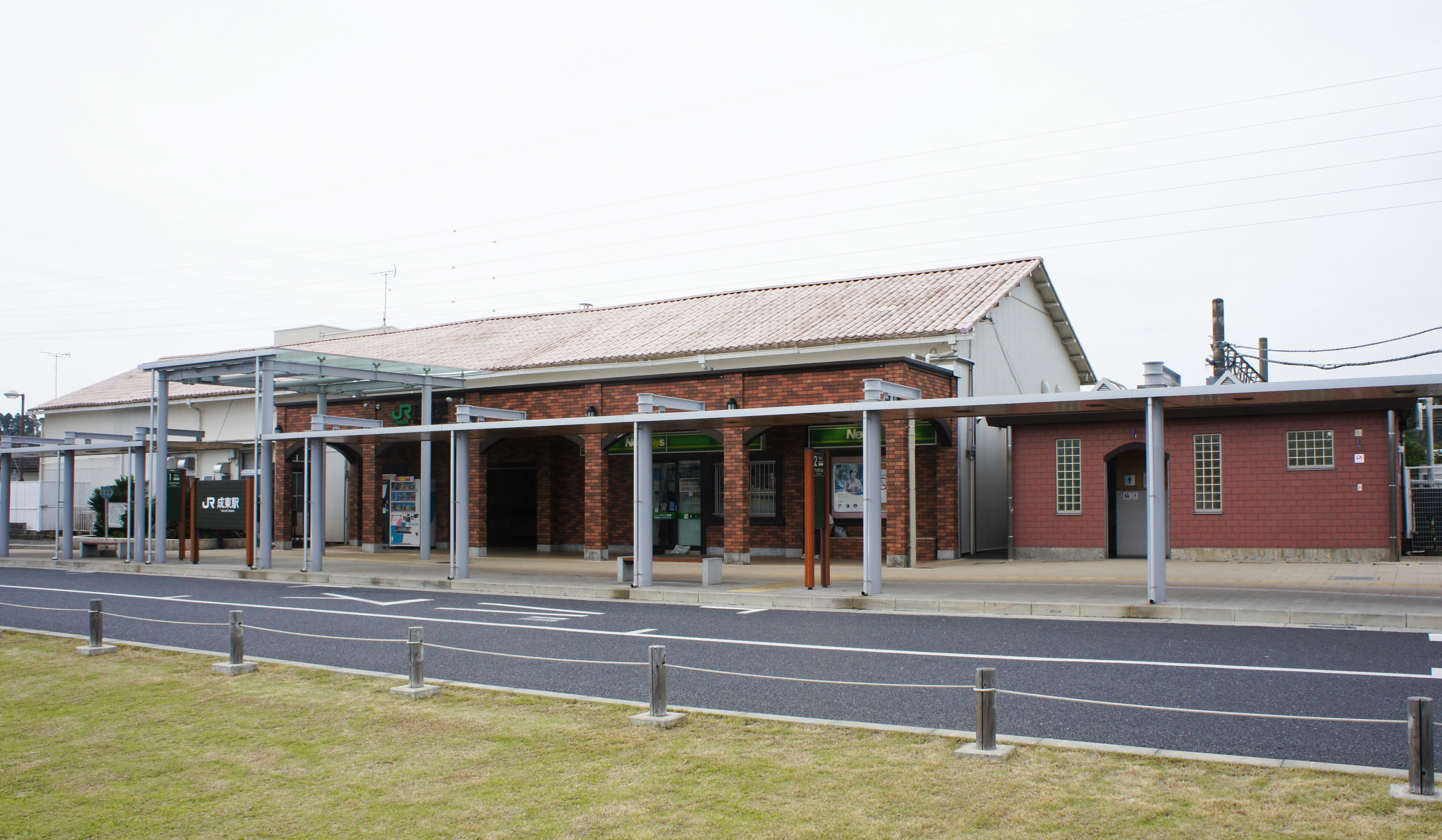
- Station forecourt after rebuilding, May 2021

General information
- Location: 305 Tsube, Sanmu-shi, Chiba-ken 289-1345; Japan
- Coordinates: 35.6086°N 140.4101°E
- Operator: JR East
- Lines: ■ Sōbu Main Line; ■ Tōgane Line
- Distance: 76.9 km from Tokyo
- Platforms: 1 side + 1 bay platform
- Tracks: 4

Other information
- Status: Staffed ("Midori no Madoguchi" )
- Website: Official website

History
- Opened: 1 May 1897

Passengers
- FY2019: 2783

Services
Preceding station	JR East	Following station
Yachimata towards Tokyo	Shiosai	Yokoshiba towards Chōshi
Yachimata towards Chiba	Sōbu Main Line Rapid	Terminus
Hyūga towards Chiba	Sōbu Main Line Local	Matsuo towards Chōshi
Gumyō towards Ōami	Tōgane Line	Terminus
Location
- Location within Chiba Prefecture Location within Japan

Narutō Station (成東駅, Narutō-eki) a junction passenger railway station in the city of Sanmu, Chiba Japan, operated by the East Japan Railway Company (JR East).

== Lines ==
Narutō Station is served by the Sōbu Main Line and Tōgane Line, and is located 76.9 km from the western terminus of the Sōbu Main Line at Tokyo Station. It also forms the eastern terminus of the 13.8 kilometer Tōgane Line to Ōami. Shiosai limited express services between Tokyo and Chōshi stop at this station.

== Station layout ==
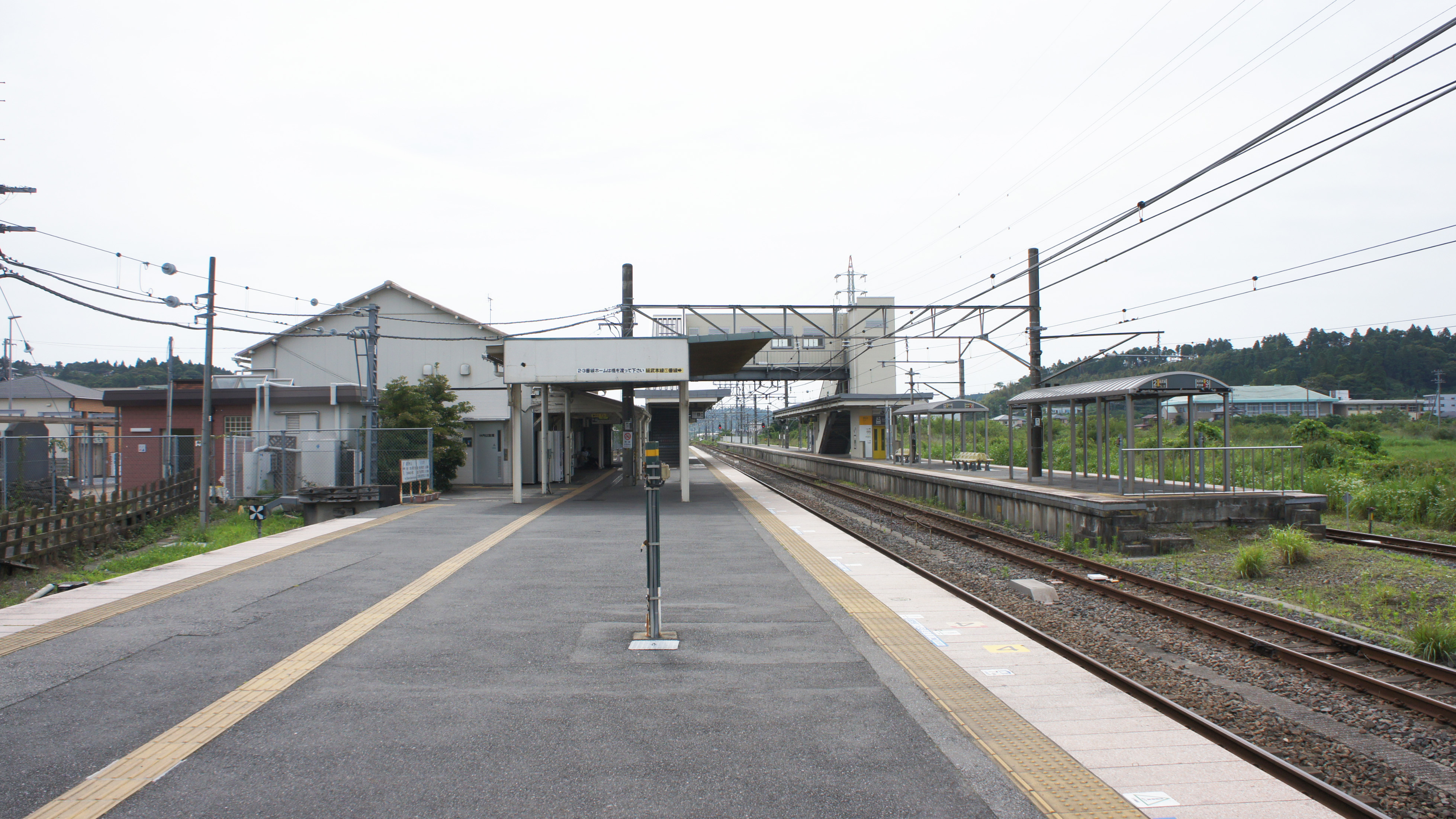
View of the platforms

Narutō Station has two side platforms and a single island platform, one side of which has a cutout, enabling the station to serve a total of four tracks. Then platforms are connected to the station building by a footbridge. The station has a "Midori no Madoguchi" staffed ticket office.

=== Platforms ===
0	■ Tōgane Line	for Tōgane, Ōami, Soga, and Chiba
1,2	■ Sōbu Line	for Sakura,Chiba, and Tokyo for Yōkaichiba, Asahi, and Chōshi
3	■ Sōbu Line	for Sakura and Chiba for Yōkaichiba, Asahi, and Chōshi
3	■ Tōgane Line	for Tōgane, Ōami, Soga, and Chiba

== History ==
Narutō Station opened on 1 May 1897. During World War II, on 13 August 1945, a train containing five passenger carriages and four freight carriages was strafed by American aircraft while stopped at Narutō Station. The freight cars contained four anti-aircraft guns and ammunition, which were ignited in the attack. Although station workers and members of the Imperial Japanese Army 3rd Guards Division attempted to extinguish the fire, the resultant explosion killed 15 civilian station staff and 27 soldiers. A memorial to the event was erected at the station in 1957.

== Passenger statistics ==
In fiscal 2019, the station was used by an average of 2783 passengers daily (boarding passengers only).

== Surrounding area ==
- Sanmu City Hall
- Sanmu Police Station
- National Route 126

== See also ==
- List of railway stations in Japan
