= Tōgane Station =

Railway station in Tōgane, Chiba Prefecture, Japan

Tōgane Station 東金駅
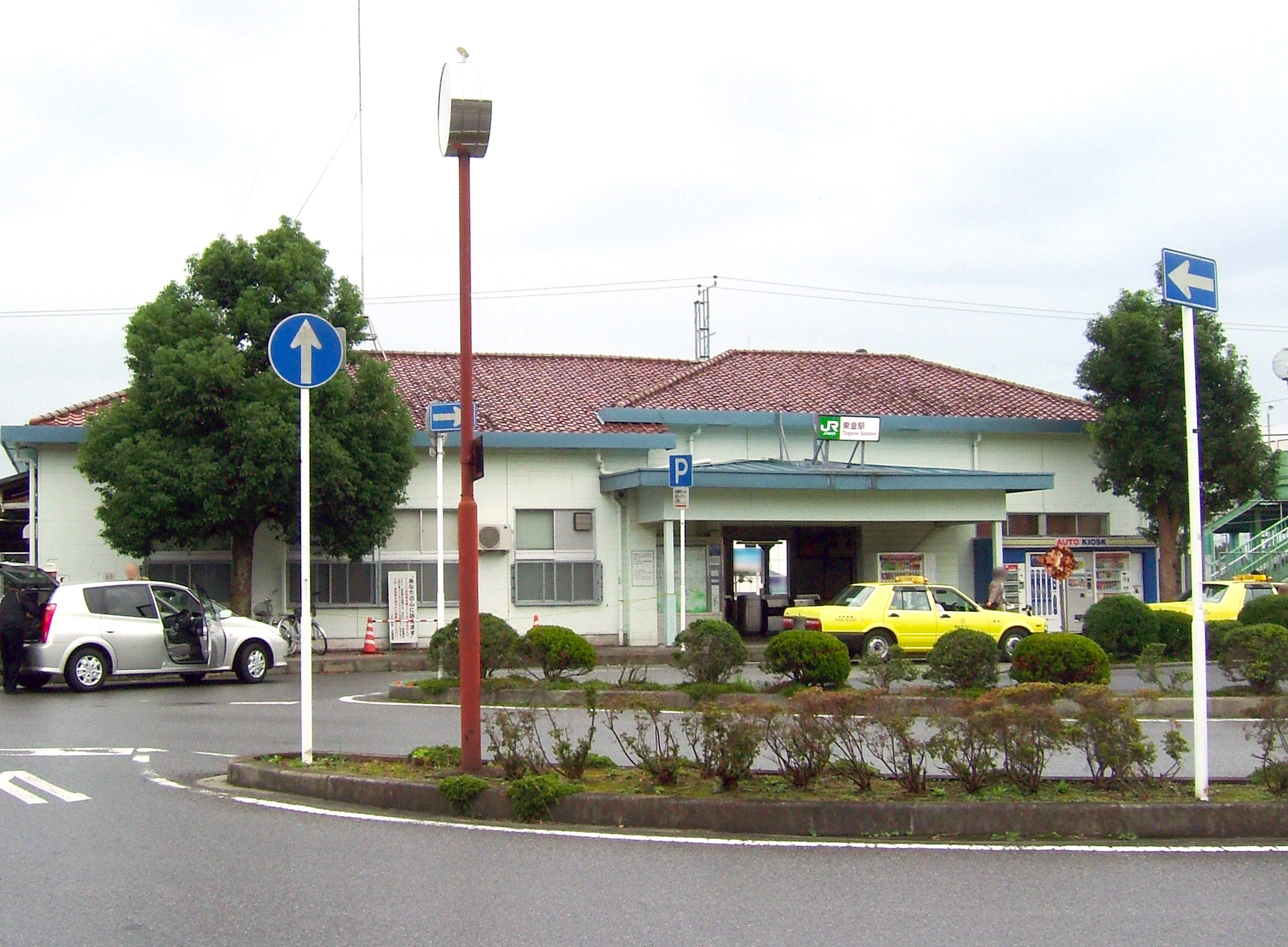
- Tōgane Station

General information
- Location: Tōgane 585, Tōgane-shi, Chiba-ken; Japan
- Coordinates: 35.56025°N 140.363583°E
- Operator: JR East
- Line: ■ Tōgane Line
- Distance: 5.8 km from Ōami
- Platforms: 2 side platforms

Other information
- Status: Staffed
- Website: Official website

History
- Opened: June 30, 1900

Passengers
- FY2019: 4187 daily

Services
Preceding station	JR East	Following station
Fukutawara towards Ōami	Tōgane Line	Gumyō towards Narutō
Location
- Location within Chiba Prefecture Location within Japan

Tōgane Station (東金駅, Tōgane-eki) is a passenger railway station in the city of Tōgane, Chiba Japan, operated by the East Japan Railway Company (JR East).

== Lines ==
Tōgane Station is served by the Tōgane Line between Ōami and Narutō, and is located 5.8 kilometers from the terminus of the line at Ōami Station.

== Station layout ==
The station consists of two opposed side platforms. One platform is directly adjacent to the old wooden station building, and was originally a semi-bay platform; the other is connected by a footbridge. The station is staffed.

=== Platform ===
1	■ Tōgane Line	For Ōami, Chiba
2	■ Tōgane Line	For Narutō

== History ==
Tōgane Station was opened on June 30, 1900 as a terminal station on the Bōsō Railway. The line was nationalized on September 1, 1907 and became part of the Japanese Government Railways (JGR). The terminal station was extended from Tōgane to Ōami on October 12, 1909 and in the opposite direction to Narutō by November 1, 1911. From November 25, 1926 to March 1, 1961, the station was also a terminal for the now-defunct Kujukuri Railway. The station was absorbed into the JR East network upon the privatization of the JNR on April 1, 1987.

== Passenger statistics ==
In fiscal 2019, the station was used by an average of 4187 passengers daily (boarding passengers only).

== Surrounding area ==
- Tōgane City Hall

== See also ==
- List of railway stations in Japan
