= Hyūga Station =

Railway station in Sanmu, Chiba Prefecture, Japan

Hyūga Station 日向駅
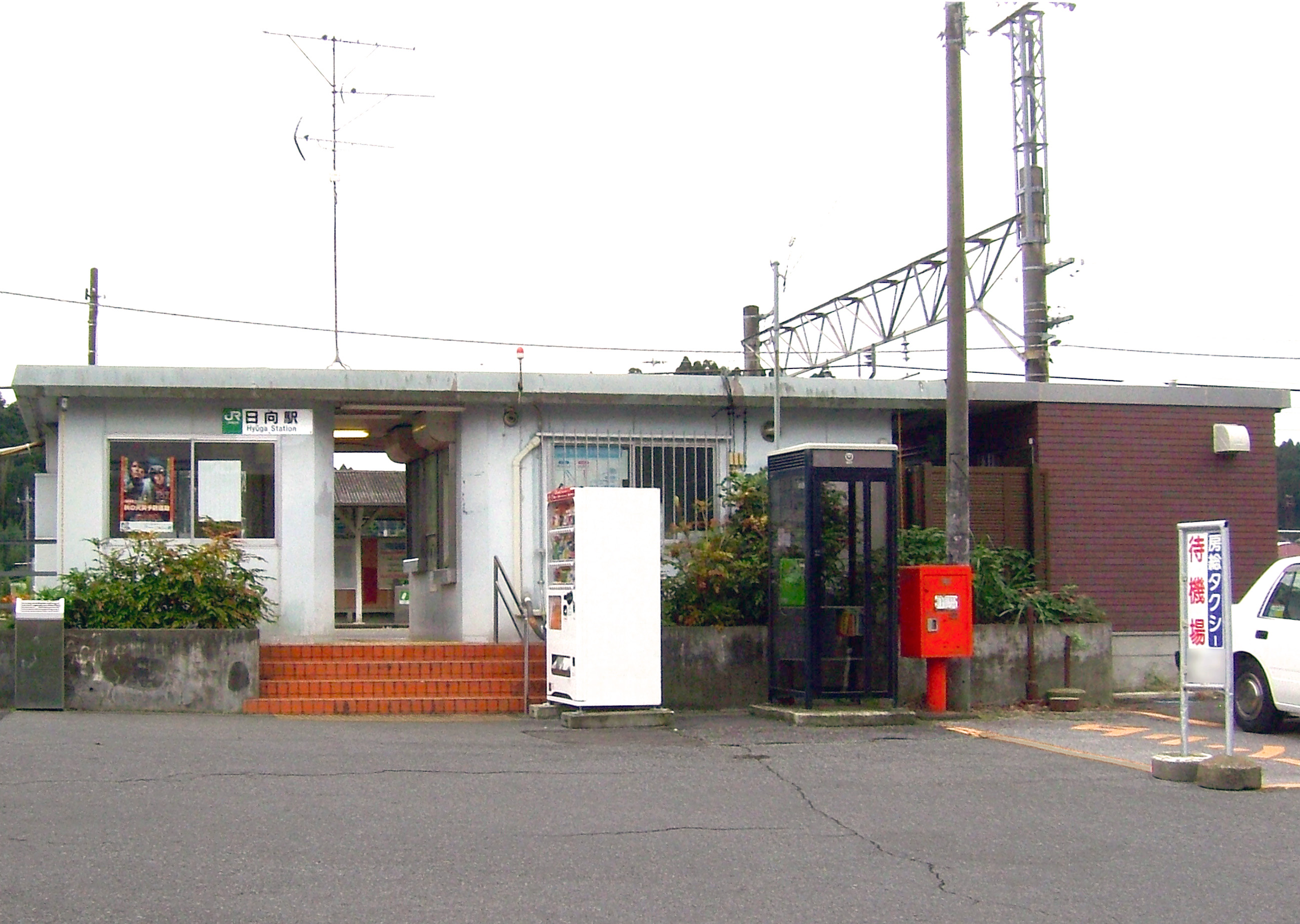
- Hyūga Station in October 2008

General information
- Location: Shiizaki 300, Sanmu-shi, Chiba-ken 289-1205; Japan
- Coordinates: 35.6283°N 140.3627°E
- Operator: JR East
- Line: ■ Sōbu Main Line
- Distance: 71.7 km from Tokyo
- Platforms: 2 side platforms

Other information
- Status: Staffed
- Website: Official website

History
- Opened: October 12, 1899

Passengers
- FY2019: 873

Services
Preceding station	JR East	Following station
Yachimata towards Chiba	Sōbu Main Line Local	Narutō towards Chōshi
Location
- Location within Chiba Prefecture Location within Japan

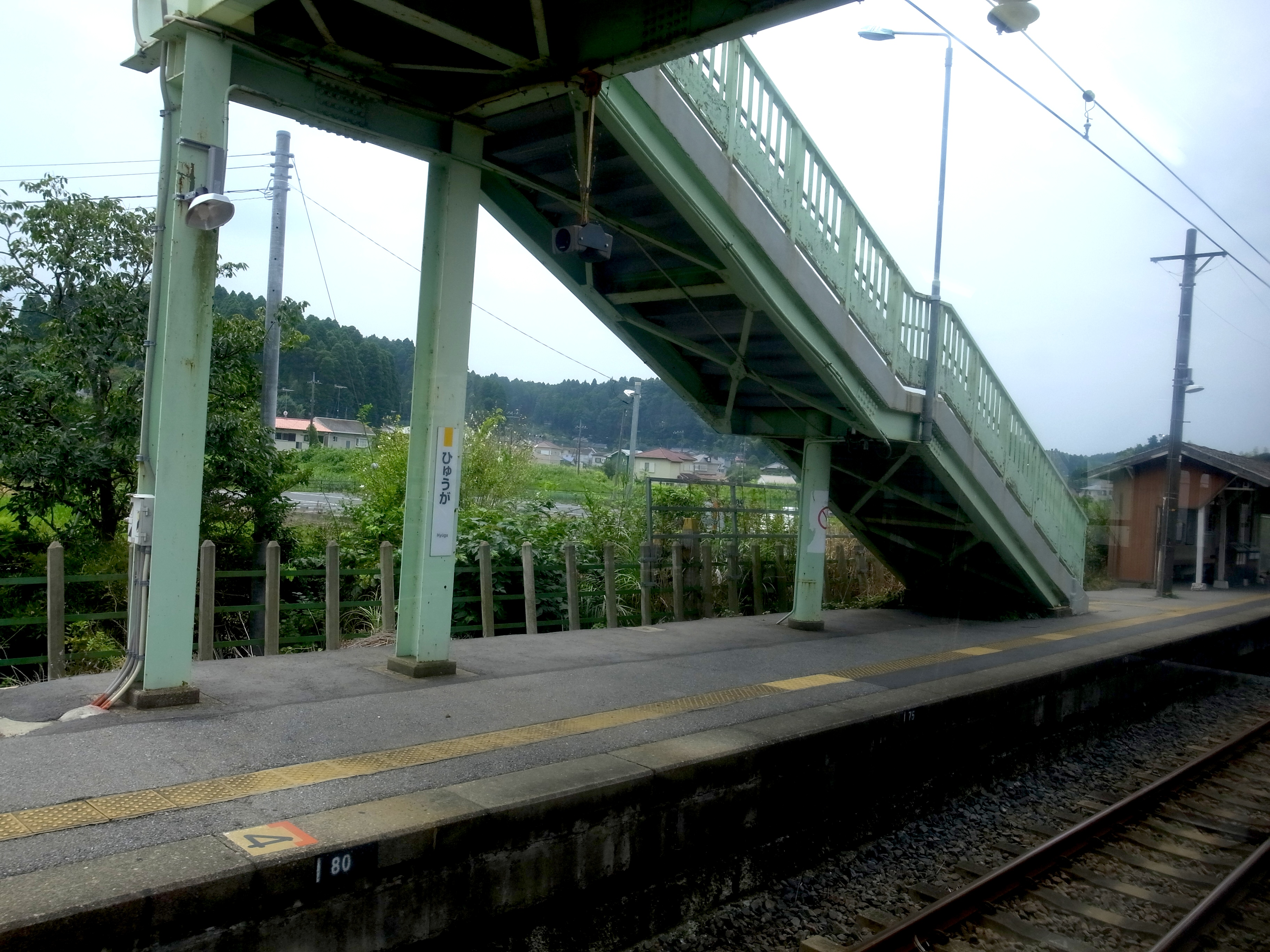
Station platform, 2014.

Hyūga Station (日向駅, Hyūga-eki) is a passenger railway station in the city of Sanmu, Chiba, Japan, operated by the East Japan Railway Company (JR East).

== Lines ==
Hyūga Station is served by the Sōbu Main Line, and is located 71.7 km from the western terminus of the line at Tokyo Station.

== Layout ==
The station consists of two opposed side platforms connected by a footbridge. The station is staffed.

=== Platforms ===
1	■ Sobu Main Line	for Sakura, Narutō, and Chiba
2	■ Sobu Main Line	for Asahi, Yōkaichiba, and Chōshi

== History ==
Hyūga Station was opened on October 12, 1899 as a station on the Sōbu Railway for both passenger and freight operations. On September 1, 1907, the Sōbu Railway was nationalised, becoming part of the Japanese Government Railway (JGR). After World War II, the JGR became the Japan National Railways (JNR). Scheduled freight operations were suspended from October 1, 1962. A new station building was completed in July 1984. The station was absorbed into the JR East network upon the privatization of the Japan National Railways (JNR) on April 1, 1987. The station was unattended from March 15, 1974 until July 1, 1997.

== Passenger statistics ==
In fiscal 2019, the station was used by an average of 873 passengers daily (boarding passengers only).

== Surrounding area ==
The station is located in the urban center of the former town of Sanmu.

- Sanmu Middle School
- Sanmu Elementary School

== See also ==
- List of railway stations in Japan
