= Ōami Station =

Railway station in Ōamishirasato, Chiba Prefecture, Japan

Ōami Station 大網駅
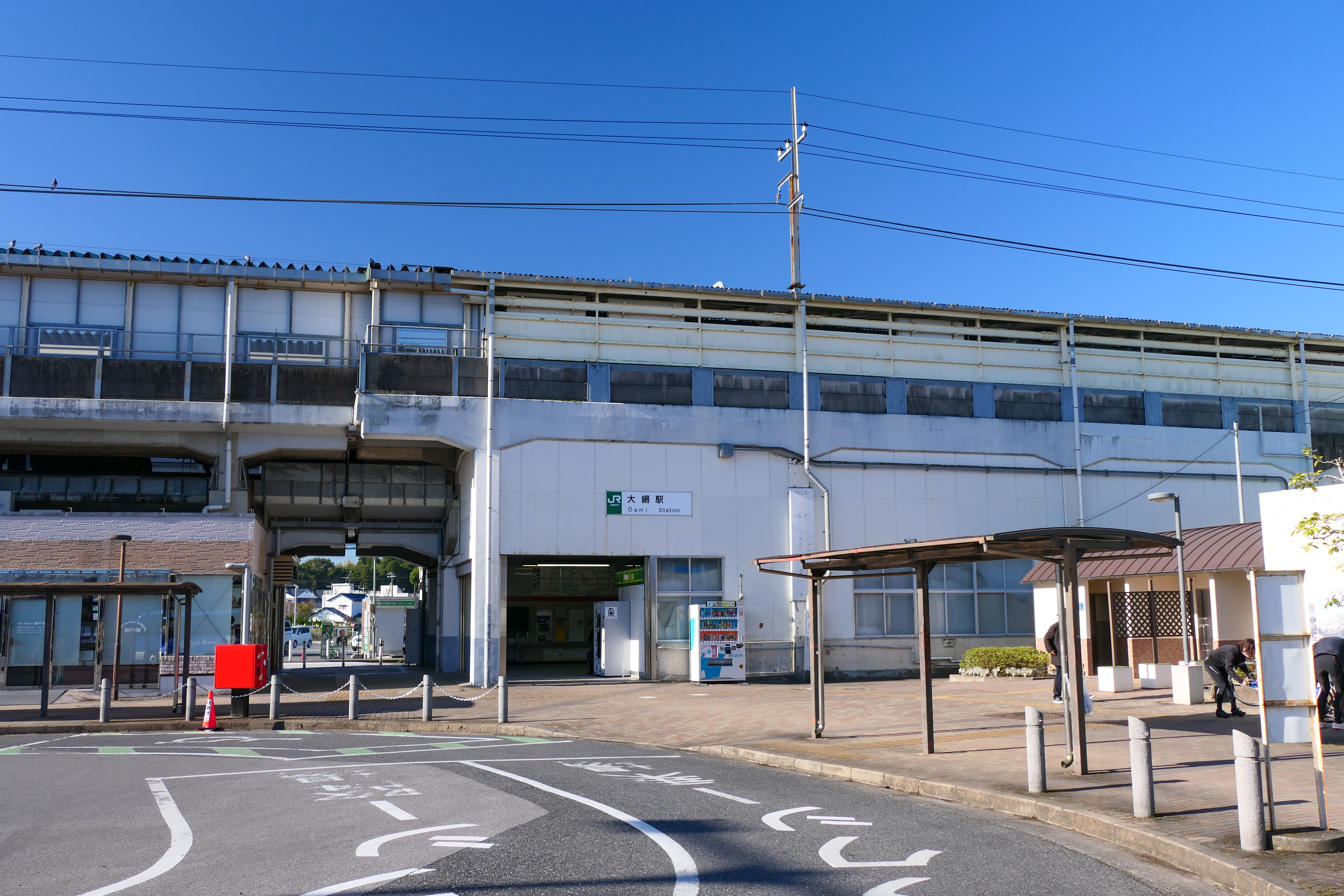
- Ōami Station

General information
- Location: 21 Minamidama, Ōamishirasato-shi, Chiba-ken 299-3244; Japan
- Coordinates: 35.5224°N 140.3113°E
- Operator: JR East
- Lines: ■ Sotobō Line; ■ Tōgane Line
- Distance: 22.9 km from Chiba
- Platforms: 2 side + 1 island platforms

Other information
- Status: Staffed (Midori no Madoguchi)
- Website: Official website

History
- Opened: 20 January 1896; 130 years ago

Passengers
- FY2019: 10,057

Services
Preceding station	JR East	Following station
Toke (limited service) towards Tokyo	Wakashio	Mobara towards Awa-Kamogawa
Toke towards Soga	Sotobō Line Keiyō Rapid	Nagata (limited service) towards Katsuura
Toke towards Chiba	Sotobō Line Sobū Rapid	Mobara towards Kazusa-Ichinomiya
Toke towards Soga or Chiba	Sotobō Line Local	Nagata towards Awa-Kamogawa
Terminus	Tōgane Line	Fukutawara towards Narutō
Location
- Location within Chiba Prefecture Location within Japan

Ōami Station (大網駅, Ōami-eki) is a junction passenger railway station in the city of Ōamishirasato, Chiba Prefecture, Japan, operated by East Japan Railway Company (JR East).

== Lines ==
Ōami Station is served by the Sotobō Line and Tōgane Line. It is located 22.9 km (14.2 mi) from the terminus of the Sotobō Line at Chiba Station, and forms the eastern terminus of the 13.8-kilometer (8.6 mi) Tōgane Line.

== Station layout ==
The station has consists of two opposed side platforms serving the Sotobō Line tracks and a single island platform serving the Tōgane Line tracks. The station has a Midori no Madoguchi staffed ticket office.

=== Platforms ===
1	■ Sotobō Line	for Soga, Chiba, Kaihin-Makuhari, and Tokyo
2	■ Sotobō Line	for Mobara, Kazusa-Ichinomiya, Katsuura, and Awa-Kamogawa
3	■ Tōgane Line	for Tōgane and Narutō
4	■ Tōgane Line	for Tōgane, Narutō, and Chiba

== History ==
Ōami Station was opened on 20 January 1896, as the terminal station of the Bōsō Railway. The line was extended to Ichinomiya in 1897. The Tōgane Line began operations from 30 June 1900. On 1 September 1907, the Bōsō Railway was nationalized and became part of the Japanese Government Railways, which was transformed into the Japanese National Railways (JNR) after World War II. Freight operations were discontinued on 1 July 1971. On 27 May 1972, the station building was relocated to its present location, to eliminate the use of a switchback. The station was absorbed into the JR East network upon the privatization of JNR on 1 April 1987.

== Passenger statistics ==
In fiscal 2019, the station was used by an average of 10,057 passengers daily (boarding passengers only).

== Surrounding area ==
- Ōami City Hall
- Ōami High School
- Ōami Post Office

== See also ==
- List of railway stations in Japan
