= Kagaya =

Kagaya is a Japanese family name and may refer to:

- Ken Kagaya (politician) (1943–2014), Japanese Democratic Party politician
- Ken Kagaya (artist) (1944–2003), Japanese painter and writer
- Kagaya Yutaka (born 1968), Japanese digital artist
- Kagaya (Kabuki), a traditional name of Kabuki actor's group Yagō
- Kagaya Ubuyashiki, a character in Demon Slayer: Kimetsu no Yaiba
