= Sayaka =

- Pronunciation: [sa.ja.ka]
- Gender: Female

Origin
- Origin: Japanese
- Meaning: Different meanings depending on the kanji used
- Region of origin: Japan

Other names
- Related names: Sayako; Sayoko

Sayaka (Japanese: さやか, サヤカ) is a feminine Japanese given name.

== People with the name ==
- Sayaka Aida (相田 さやか; born 1975), Japanese voice actress
- Sayaka Akase (赤瀬 紗也香; born 1994), Japanese swimmer
- Sayaka Akimoto (秋元 才加; born 1988), Japanese actress and singer
- Sayaka Ando (安藤 沙耶香; born 1981), Japanese gravure idol and fashion model
- Sayaka Aoki (athlete) (青木 沙弥佳; born 1986), Japanese track and field sprinter and hurdler
- Sayaka Aoki (comedian) (青木 さやか; born 1973), Japanese entertainer, comedian and actress
- Sayaka Aoki (voice actress) (あおき さやか; born 1972), Japanese voice actress
- Sayaka Araki (荒木 さやか; born 1984), Japanese fashion model, disc jockey, and businesswoman
- Sayaka Fukita (吹田 早哉佳; born 1984), Japanese actress
- Sayaka Ganz (born 1976), Japanese sculptor
- Sayaka Harada (原田 彩楓; born 1997), Japanese voice actress
- Sayaka Hirano (平野 早矢香; born 1985), Japanese five-time national table tennis champion
- Sayaka Hirota (廣田 彩花; born 1994), Japanese badminton player
- Sayaka Hobara (保原 彩夏; born 1998), Japanese badminton player
- Sayaka Ichii (市井 紗耶香; born 1983), Japanese pop singer, TV talent and actress
- Sayaka Iriuchijima (入内嶋 涼; born 1999), Japanese idol of the idol group SKE48
- Sayaka Ishii (石井 さやか; born 2005), Japanese professional tennis player
- Sayaka Isoyama (磯山 さやか; born 1983), Japanese gravure idol, television personality, actress and writer
- Sayaka Kakehashi (掛橋 沙耶香; born 2002), Japanese former idol of the idol group Nogizaka46
- Sayaka Kamiya (神谷 涼; born 1982), Japanese actress and model
- Sayaka Kamiyama, Japanese singer, member of Thyme
- Sayaka Kanda (神田 沙也加; 1986–2021), Japanese actress, singer, and model
- Sayaka Kaneko (金子 彩花), Japanese voice actress
- Sayaka Karasugi, Japanese-Canadian dancer
- Sayaka Kawagoe (川越 紗彩; born 2000), Japanese idol of the idol group NGT48
- Sayaka Kikuchi (菊池 紗矢香), Japanese voice actress
- Sayaka Kinoshita (木下 紗華; born 1981), Japanese voice actress
- Sayaka Kitahara (北原 沙弥香; born 1993), Japanese voice actress, actress and former singer
- Sayaka Kobayashi (小林 さやか; born 1970), Japanese actress and voice actress
- Sayaka Kobayashi (politician) (小林 さやか; born 1983), Japanese politician
- Sayaka Kurara (玖麗 さやか; born 2000), Japanese professional wrestler
- Sayaka Matsumoto (サヤカ 松本; born 1982), Japanese-born American judoka
- Sayaka Mikami (三上 紗也可; born 2000), Japanese diver
- Sayaka Minami (南 さやか; born 1983), Japanese pop singer
- Sayaka Mitani (三谷 沙也加; born 1995), Japanese professional footballer
- Sayaka Mori (森 さやか; born 1988), Japanese softball player
- Sayaka Morohoshi (諸星 清佳; born 1965), Japanese journalist
- Sayaka Murata (村田 沙耶香; born 1979), Japanese writer
- Sayaka Nagatomo (長友 さやか; born 1995), Japanese idol of the idol group Happiness
- Sayaka Nakaya (仲谷 明香; born 1991), Japanese voice actress
- Sayaka Niidoi (新土居 沙也加; born 1994), Japanese former idol of the idol group SKE48
- Sayaka Nishiwaki (西脇 彩華; born 1992), Japanese former idol of the idol group 9nine
- Sayaka Obihiro (帯広 さやか; born 1986), Japanese professional wrestler
- Sayaka Ohara (大原 さやか; born 1975), Japanese voice actress
- Sayaka Oishi (大石 沙也加; born 1991), Japanese sprinter
- Sayaka Osakabe (小酒部 さやか; born 1977), Japanese women's rights activist and politician
- Sayaka Sasaki (佐咲 紗花; born 1982), Japanese musician
- Sayaka Sasaki (politician) (佐々木 さやか; born 1981), Japanese politician
- Sayaka Sato (佐藤 冴香; born 1991), Japanese badminton player
- Sayaka Senbongi (千本木 彩花; born 1995), Japanese voice actress
- Sayaka Setoyama (瀬戸山 清香; born 1987), Japanese idol of the idol group Earth
- Sayaka Shioda (塩田 さやか), Japanese former mixed martial arts fighter
- Sayaka Shionoya (塩ノ谷 早耶香; born 1994), Japanese former female singer
- Sayaka Shoji (庄司 紗矢香; born 1983), Japanese classical violinist
- Sayaka Takahashi (高橋 沙也加; born 1992), Japanese badminton player
- Sayaka Tsutsui (筒井 さやか; born 1992), Japanese volleyball player
- Sayaka Yamaguchi (山口 紗弥加; born 1980), Japanese actress
- Sayaka Yamamoto (山本 彩; born 1993), Japanese singer-songwriter
- Sayaka Yamamoto (山本 紗也加; born 1987), Japanese idol of the idol group Dream
- Sayaka Yoshimura (吉村 紗也香; born 1992), Japanese curler
- Sayaka Yoshino (吉野 紗香; born 1992), Japanese model, actress, and media persona
- Unagi Sayaka (ウナギ サヤカ; born 1986), Japanese professional wrestler working as a freelancer
- Kim Chung-seon (1571–1642), birth name Sayaka (沙也可) and often known by his pen name Mohadang, Japanese general who defected to Korea during the Japanese invasions of Korea (1592–1598)

== Fictional characters ==
- The heroine of the video game Ape Escape 3, known as Sayaka in Japan and Europe and as Yumi in the US
- Sayaka, Akuma's wife and Gotetsu's niece in Street Fighter
- Sayaka, a character in the film Super Heroine Witch Hunter SAYAKA
- Sayaka Hozumi, a character in the anime Brighter than Dawning Blue
- Sayaka Igarashi, a character in the anime Kakegurui
- Sayaka Jinguji, a character in Cinderella Nine
- Sayaka Kakei, a character in Oreimo
- Sayaka Kanamori, a character in the anime Keep Your Hands Off Eizouken!
- Sayaka Kirasaka, a character in the light novel Strike the Blood
- Sayaka Maizono, a character in the video game Danganronpa: Trigger Happy Havoc
- Sayaka Murano, a main character in mobile app Link! Like! Love Live!
- Sayaka Miki, a main character in the anime Puella Magi Madoka Magica
- Sayaka Mine, a character in the Yaiba
- Sayaka Nagisa, a character in the Dengeki Sentai Changeman
- Sayaka Natori, a character in Your Name
- Sayaka Ogino, a main character in Guilty (manga)
- Sayaka Saeki, a character in the anime Bloom Into You
- Sayaka Yumi, heroine of Go Nagai's manga and anime Mazinger Z
