= Ken Kagaya =

Ken Kagaya may refer to:

- Ken Kagaya (politician)
- Ken Kagaya (artist)
