= Sayoko =

- Gender: Female

Origin
- Origin: Japanese
- Meaning: Different meanings depending on the kanji used

Other names
- Related names: Sayaka; Sayako; Yoko

Sayoko (written: 小夜子, 紗代子, 佐代子, 沙代子, 彩世子 or 咲世子) is a feminine Japanese given name. Notable people with the name include:

- Sayoko Eri (江里 佐代子; 1945–2007), Japanese kirikane artist
- Sayoko Hagiwara (萩原 佐代子; born 1962), Japanese actress
- Sayoko Ishii (石井 佐代子; born 1970), Japanese actress and gravure model
- Sayoko Izumi (泉 彩世子; born 1988), Japanese singer-songwriter and actress
- Sayoko Kitabatake (北畠 紗代子; born 1978), Japanese archer
- Sayoko Mita (三田 佐代子; born 1969), Japanese sports journalist and television announcer
- Sayoko Ohashi (大橋 沙代子; born 1985), Japanese actress and model
- Sayoko Onishi (born 1968), Japanese butoh dancer, choreographer and master
- Sayoko Takami, a victim of the Ōmuta murders
- Sayoko Ozaki (尾崎 紗代子; born 1989), Japanese model
- Sayoko Yamaguchi (山口 小夜子; 1949–2007), Japanese model and actress

== Fictional characters ==
- Sayoko Mishima (三嶋 沙夜子), a character in the manga series Oh My Goddess!
- Sayoko Mitamura (三田村 小夜子), a character in Gallery Fake
- Sayoko Nanamori (七森 小夜子), a character in RahXephon
- Sayoko Shinozaki (篠崎 咲世子), a character in the anime series Code Geass
- Sayoko Takayama (高山 紗代子), a character in The Idolmaster Million Live!
- Sayoko Tsumura (津村 沙世子), a character in Rokubanme no Sayoko
