= Shoichi Usui =

Japanese politician

- 臼井 正一
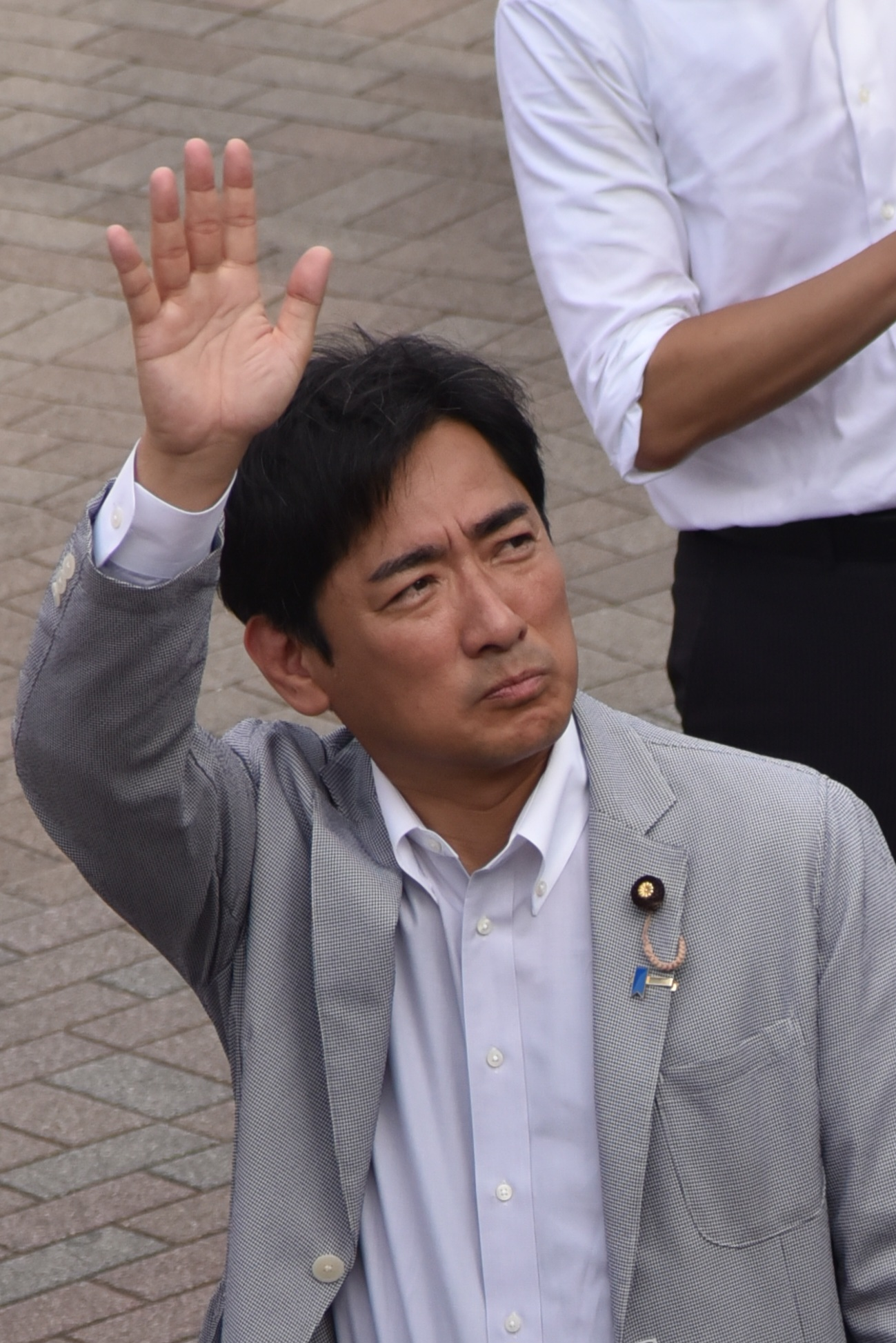
- Usui in 2025

Member of the House of Councillors
- Incumbent
- Assumed office 26 July 2022
- Preceded by: Taichirō Motoe
- Constituency: Chiba at-large

Member of the Chiba Prefectural Assembly
- In office 30 April 2011 – 29 April 2022
- Constituency: Mihama Ward, Chiba City
- In office 30 April 2003 – 2009
- Constituency: Mihama Ward, Chiba City

Personal details
- Born: 8 January 1975 (age 51) Narashino, Chiba, Japan
- Party: Liberal Democratic
- Parent: Hideo Usui (father)
- Education: Nihon University

Shoichi Usui (born January 8, 1975, in Chiba Prefecture, Japan) is a Japanese politician who has served as a member of the House of Councillors of Japan since 2022. He is one of the six representatives of the Chiba at-large district, and is a member of the Liberal Democratic Party.

As of July 29, 2023, he is a member of the following committees:

- Committee on Education, Culture and Science
- Committee on Budget
- Commission on the Constitution

He previously served in the Chiba Prefectural Assembly.

He is the son of retired politician and former Cabinet member Hideo Usui.
