= Kazuyasu =

- Gender: Male

Origin
- Origin: Japanese
- Meaning: Different meanings depending on the kanji used

Kazuyasu (written: 和靖 or 一保) is a masculine Japanese given name. Notable people with the name include:

- Kazuyasu Minobe (見延 和靖; born 1987), Japanese fencer
- Kazuyasu Shiina (椎名 一保; born 1952), Japanese politician
