= Kirikane =

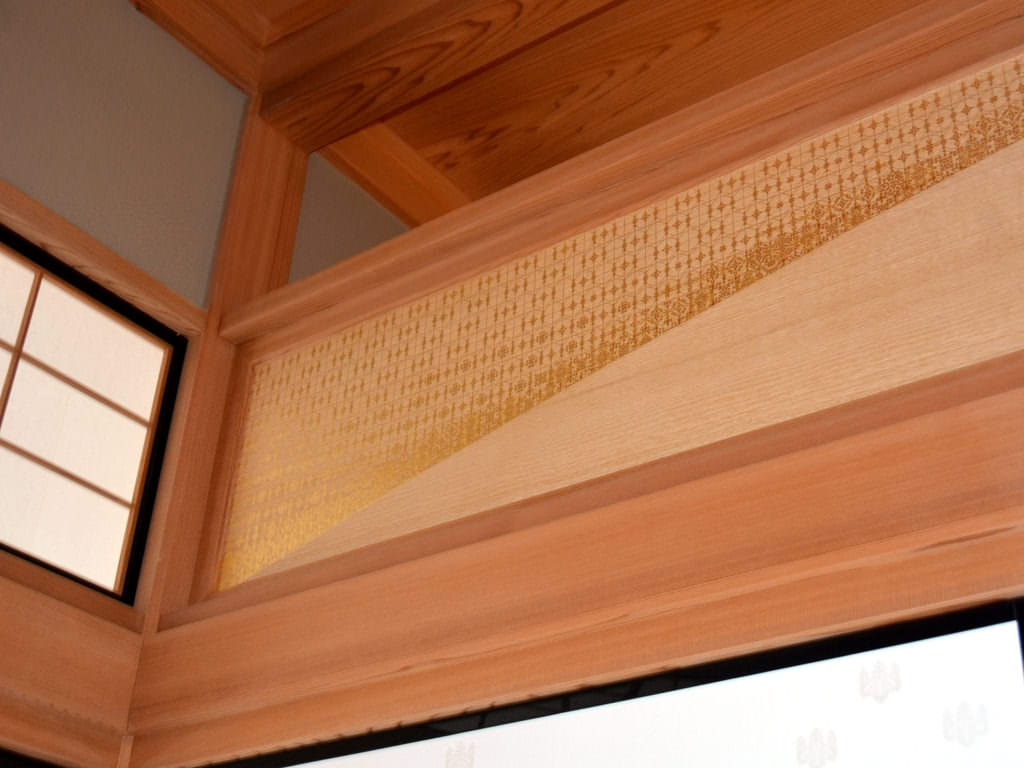
Kirikane works at the Kyoto State Guest House by Living National Treasure Eri Sayoko

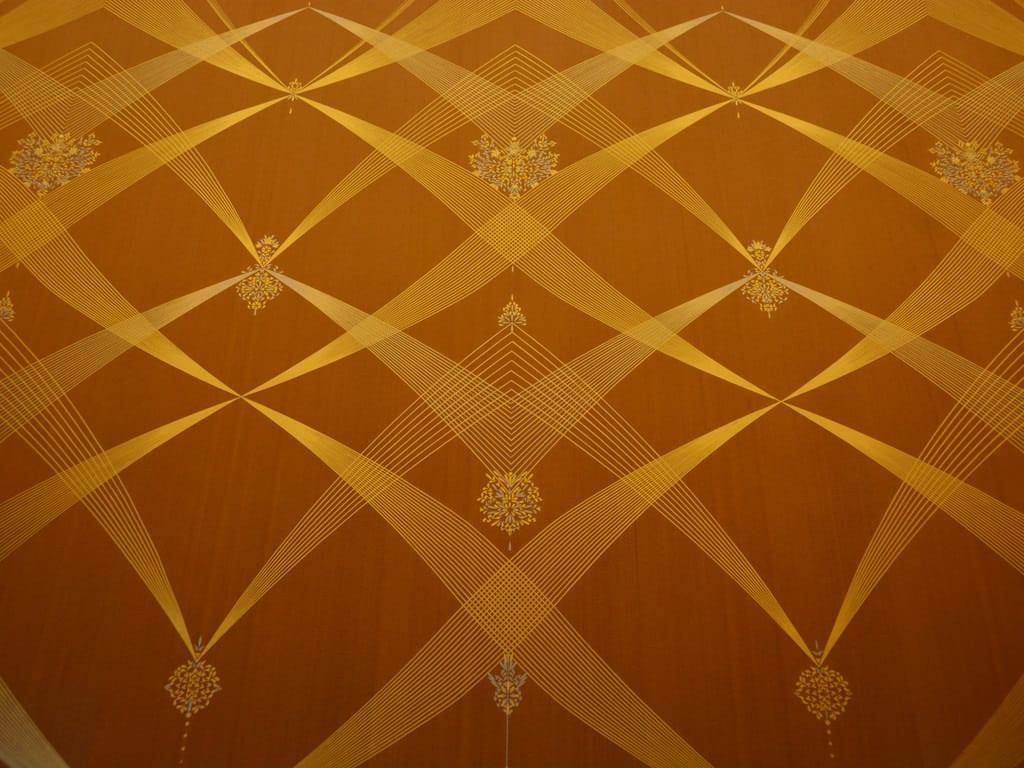
Kirikane works at the Kyoto State Guest House by Eri Sayoko

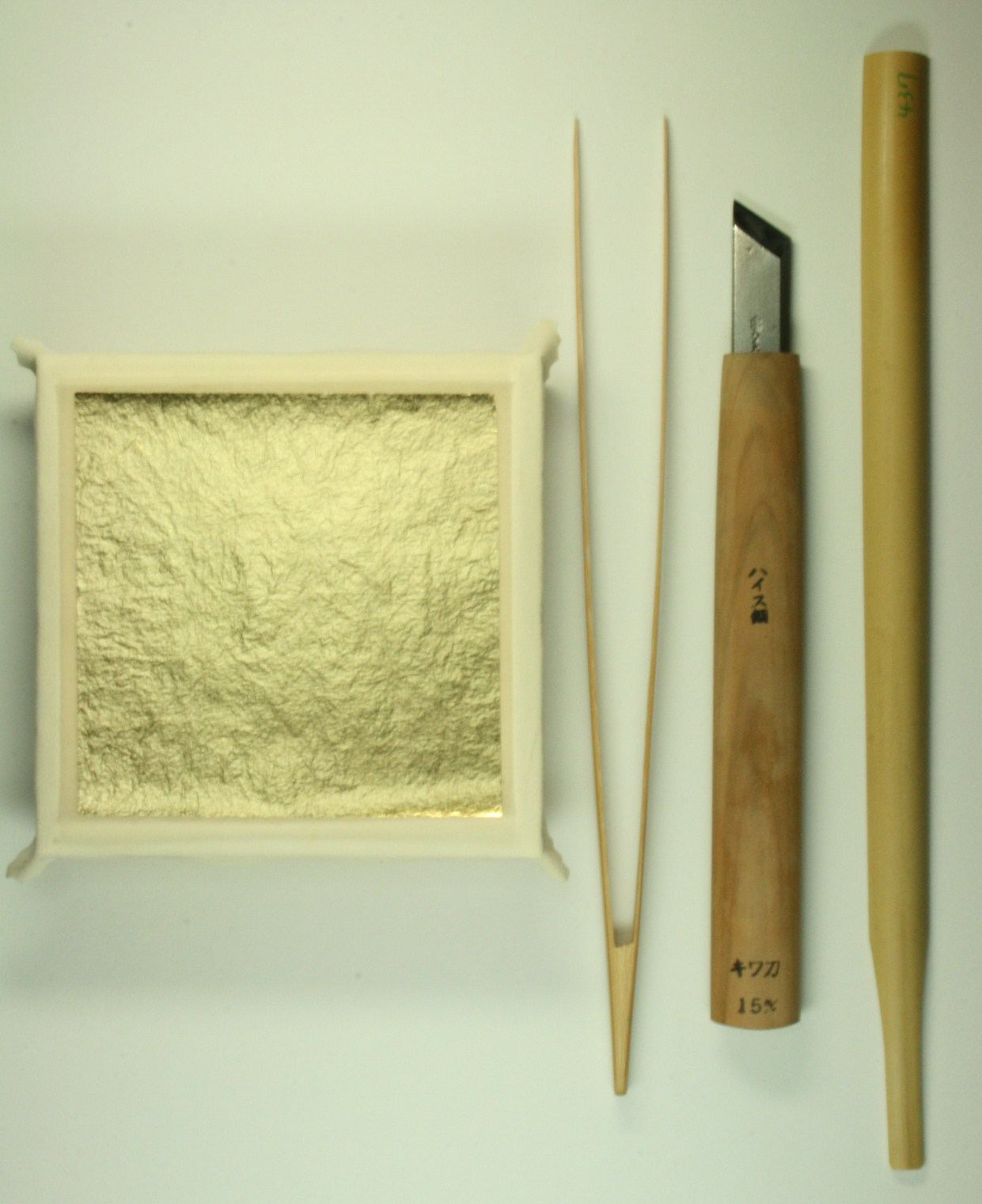
Kirikane tools

Kirikane (截金) is a Japanese decorative technique used for Buddhist statues and paintings, using gold leaf, silver leaf, or platinum leaf cut into lines, diamonds, and triangles.

== History ==
Kirikane was imported from China during the Tang dynasty (618–907). The oldest example is Tamamushi Shrine at Hōryū-ji. Kirikane flourished primarily in the 11th century and continued until the 13th or 14th century. After that, however, kirikane almost disappeared, due to the overall decline of Buddhist art.

== Technique ==
Two pieces of leaf (gold or silver, platinum) are heated over an ash-banked fire and bonded together. An additional bonding is then done to further strengthen the leaf and add thickness. Next, the bonded leaf is cut with a bamboo knife on a deer-skin-covered table, then affixed with glue (seaweed glue, funori and hide glue, nikawa, etc.) to the object to be decorated.

== See also ==
- Eri Sayoko, Living National Treasure for kirikane
- Buddharupa

== Bibliography ==
- Sayoko Eri Kirikane World -Brilliance and Romance of Gold Leaf - ISBNISBN 4-915857-59-X
