= Kuniko Inoguchi =

Japanese politician (born 1952)

- 猪口 邦子
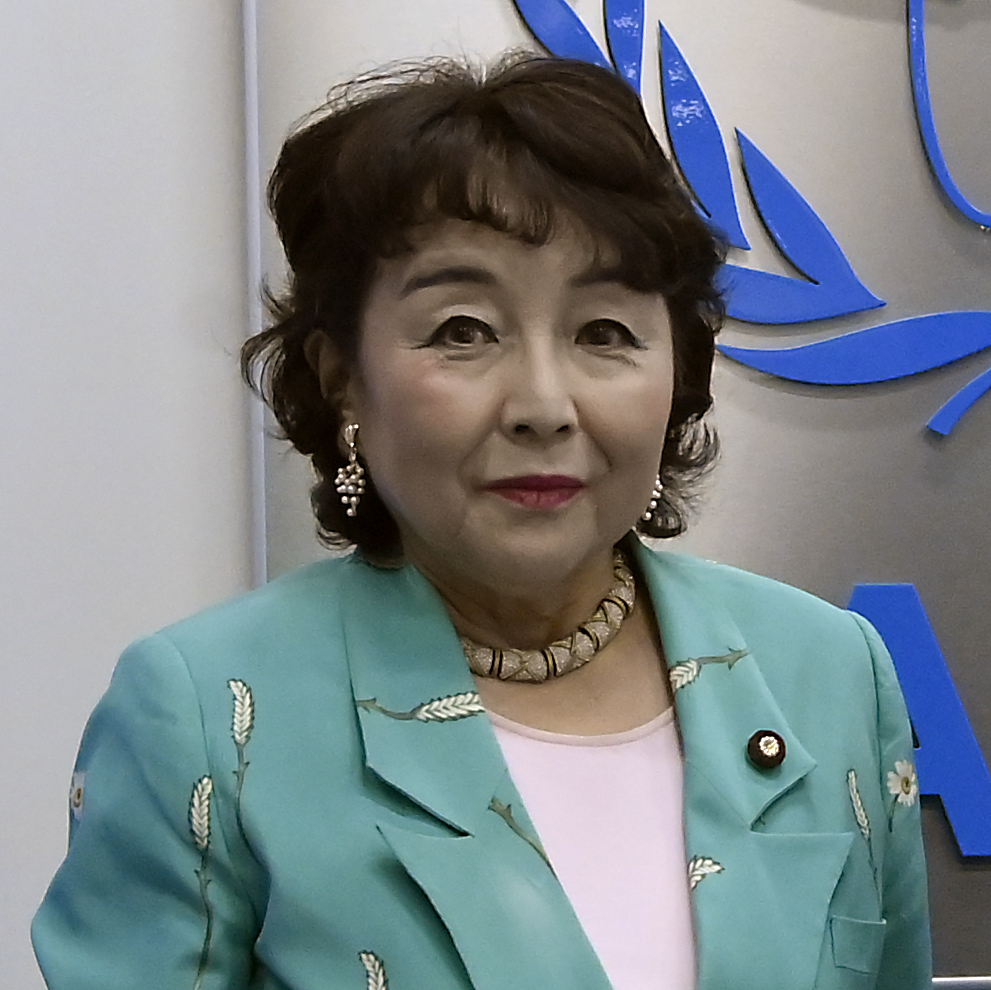
- Inoguchi in 2023

Minister of State for Gender Equality and Social Affairs
- In office 31 October 2005 – 26 September 2006
- Prime Minister: Junichiro Koizumi
- Preceded by: Chieko Nōno
- Succeeded by: Sanae Takaichi

Member of the House of Councillors
- Incumbent
- Assumed office 26 July 2010
- Preceded by: Kazuyasu Shiina
- Constituency: Chiba at-large

Member of the House of Representatives
- In office 11 September 2005 – 21 July 2009
- Constituency: Tokyo PR

Ambassador of Japan to the Conference on Disarmament
- In office April 2002 – April 2004

Personal details
- Born: Kuniko Yokota; 3 May 1952 (age 74) Ichikawa, Chiba, Japan
- Party: Liberal Democratic
- Spouse: Takashi Inoguchi (died 2024)
- Children: 2
- Education: Sophia University; Yale University

Kuniko Inoguchi (猪口 邦子, Inoguchi Kuniko; born 3 May 1952) is a Japanese political scientist and politician. She served as Minister of State for Gender Equality and Social Affairs from 2005 to 2006, and is currently a member of the House of Councillors representing Chiba Prefecture for the Liberal Democratic Party.

== Research career ==
She received her Ph.D. in Political Science from Yale University in 1982. She also received an M.A. from Yale University in 1977 and a B.A. from Sophia University in 1975.

She taught first as Associate Professor, then Professor, in the Faculty of Law at Sophia University, Tokyo, from 1981 to 2002. During this period, she was also a visiting fellow at Harvard University's Center for International Affairs under the Fulbright Program. She was selected in 1993 among 100 Global Leaders for Tomorrow by the World Economic Forum.

She was asked by the government to serve on a number of councils, including the Prime Minister's Defence Policy Review Council, the Prime Minister's Administrative Reform Council, and the Prime Minister's Gender Equity Council. She was also a member of the Special Committee on the ITER Project. She served as an executive member of both the Japan Association for International Relations and the Japan Association of Gaming and Simulation, among others. In addition, she has served as a lecturer at civil service training institutions and a commentator on foreign policy and international affairs for newspapers and television. But it is known that her political slant is close to the Social Democratic Party, not to the Liberal Democratic Party, and she strongly opposed strengthening the Japan Self-Defense Forces at the Prime Minister's Administrative Reform Council.

Her publications include War and Peace (Tokyo: University of Tokyo Press, 1989, in Japanese), which earned her the Yoshino Sakuzo Prize, An Emerging Post-Hegemonic System: Choices for Japan (Tokyo: Chikuma Shobo, 1987, in Japanese), Invitation to Political Science (co-authored, Tokyo: Chikuma Shobo, 1989, in Japanese) and academic articles published in various journals.

== Diplomatic activities ==
She served as Ambassador Extraordinary and Plenipotentiary, as Head of the Delegation of Japan to the Conference on Disarmament in Geneva, Switzerland, from April 2002 to April 2004. She also served the challenging post of President to the Conference on Disarmament from 18 August to 31 December 2003, and her efforts during this tenure were highly commended by Member States. She also served as Western Group coordinator at the commencement of the 2004 session of the Conference on Disarmament.

In addition to her duties as Ambassador Extraordinary and Plenipotentiary to the Conference on Disarmament, She was appointed Chairperson of the United Nations First Biennial Meeting of States on Small Arms and Light Weapons, held in New York in July 2003. In this capacity, she instigated numerous consultations with States, regional and international organizations, and non-governmental organizations in the lead-up to the Meeting. As Chairperson, she led the Meeting to a successful conclusion with her unfailing drive and enthusiasm. Furthermore, She served as co-chair of the Standing Committee on Mine Clearance, Mine Risk Education and Mine Action Technologies, an intersessional body of the Meeting of the States Parties to the convention on the Prohibition of the Use, Stockpiling, Production and Transfer of Anti-Personnel Mines and on their Destruction in 2004. She has also made invaluable contributions in her capacity as board member of the Institute for Democracy and Electoral Assistance (IDEA), and Member of the United Nations Secretary-General's Advisory Board on Disarmament Matters, particularly in the field of disarmament and reconciliation. She is also an active member of the Club of Rome.

During her term as Ambassador to the Conference on Disarmament, she participated in numerous television programs and documentaries. She also contributed articles to various newspapers and periodicals on a wide range of topics in order to further the causes of disarmament and world peace.

== Political career ==
Inokuchi was elected to the House of Representatives as a representative of the Tokyo proportional representation block in the September 2005 general election. She entered the Liberal Democratic Party candidate list at the urging of Prime Minister Junichiro Koizumi, and was one of the best-known of the many "Koizumi Children" that entered the Diet as a result of the 2005 election.

In a surprise move on 31 October 2005, she was appointed Minister of State for Gender Equality and Social Affairs, and was placed in charge of policies associated with equal opportunities and social justice including gender equality, youth affairs, and consumer protection. She advocated providing additional financial support to families with small children, promoting equal employment policies, and promoting a change in the traditional view that women are to take primary responsibility for child care and housekeeping.

Inoguchi declined to run in the 2009 general election after the LDP offered her a lower position on the proportional representation ballot. She returned to the Diet following the 2010 House of Councillors election, in which she won a seat as an LDP candidate representing Chiba Prefecture. She held her seat in the 2016 House of Councillors election. During the campaign, Junichi Ishii, a more senior member of the House representing Chiba, publicly called Inoguchi a liar when she said she was living in the city of Ichikawa, claiming that she spent most of her time over the past six years living in Bunkyo, Tokyo, outside the prefecture.

As of 2017, she served as director of the House's Committee on Foreign Affairs and Defense and as a member of its Committee on Oversight of Administration, Special Committee on Okinawa and Northern Problems, and Board of Oversight and Review of Specially Designated Secrets.

Inoguchi became chairwoman of the Committee on the Environment in October 2025.

== Personal life ==
Kuniko Inoguchi was married to Takashi Inoguchi, senior vice president of United Nations University and an academic researcher. They had two daughters.

During and after the 2005 election, she drew media attention for her collection of brightly-colored outfits, particularly a puffy blue dress that she wore to the Cabinet confirmation ceremony in the Imperial Palace.

On the evening of November 27, 2024, a fire broke out inside the sixth-floor condominium unit in Bunkyo, Tokyo, where Inoguchi was living with her family. Police said that two bodies were found at the scene, which were later confirmed to be Kuniko's husband Takashi and their eldest daughter.

House of Councillors
Preceded by Shigeharu Aoyama	Chairman of the Committee on the Environment; 2025–present	Incumbent
Preceded by Motoyuki Fujii	Chairman of the Board of Oversight and Review of Specially Designated Secrets; 2022	Succeeded by Haruko Arimura
Preceded by Nobuo Kishi	Chairman of the Special Committee on Okinawa and Northern Territories Affairs; 2012–2013	Succeeded by Yuichiro Hata
Political offices
Preceded by Hiroyuki Hosoda as Minister of State for Gender Equality	Minister of State for Gender Equality and Social Affairs; 2005—2006	Succeeded by Sanae Takaichi
Preceded by Chieko Nōno as Minister of State for Measures against the Declining Birthrate	Minister of State for Gender Equality and Social Affairs; 2005—2006	Succeeded by Sanae Takaichi
