= Toshirō Toyoda =

- 豊田 俊郎
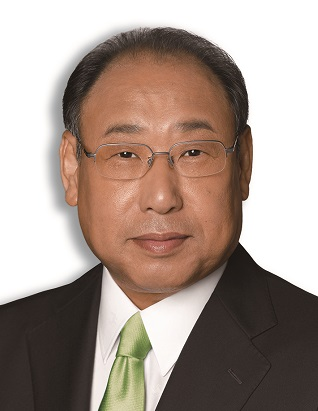
- Official portrait, 2010

Member of the House of Councillors
- In office 29 July 2013 – 28 July 2025
- Preceded by: Ken Kagaya
- Succeeded by: Sayaka Kobayashi
- Constituency: Chiba at-large

Mayor of Yachiyo
- In office 26 January 2003 – 30 April 2013
- Preceded by: Kazuharu Ōsawa
- Succeeded by: Shūichi Akiba

Member of the Chiba Prefectural Assembly
- In office 30 April 1999 – 2003
- Constituency: Yachiyo City

Personal details
- Born: 21 August 1952 (age 73) Chiba District, Chiba, Japan
- Party: Liberal Democratic

Toshirō Toyoda is a Japanese politician who is a former member of the House of Councillors of Japan.

== Career ==
Toyoda served as mayor of Yachiyo City before elected to the House of Councillors.
