= Chiba at-large district =

Japan House of Councillors constituency

- 千葉県選挙区
- Parliamentary constituency for the House of Councillors
- Prefecture: Chiba
- Electorate: 5,279,312 (as of September 2022)

Current constituency
- Created: 1947
- Seats: 6
- Councillors: Class of 2019: Junichi Ishii (LDP); Hiroyuki Nagahama (CDP); Toshiro Toyota (LDP); Class of 2022: Shoichi Usui (LDP); Kuniko Inoguchi (LDP); Hiroyuki Konishi (CDP)

The Chiba at-large district (Japanese: 千葉県選挙区, Hepburn: Chiba-ken senkyoku) is a constituency that represents Chiba Prefecture in the House of Councillors in the Diet of Japan. It has six Councillors in the 242-member house.

== Outline ==
The constituency represents the entire population of Chiba Prefecture. The district elects six Councillors to six-year terms, two sets of three each at alternating elections held every three years. Prior to the 2007 election the district elected four Councilors in two sets of two. The district has 5,092,741 registered voters as of September 2015. The Councillors currently representing Chiba are:

- Kuniko Inoguchi (Liberal Democratic Party (LDP), first term; term ends in 2016)
- Hiroyuki Konishi (Democratic Party, first term; term ends in 2016)
- Kenichi Mizuno (Democratic Party, first term; term ends in 2016)
- Junichi Ishii (LDP, second term; term ends in 2019)
- Hiroyuki Nagahama (Democratic Party, second term; term ends in 2019)
- Toshiro Toyoda (LDP, first term; term ends in 2019)

== Elected Councillors ==
Class of 1947			election year	Class of 1950 (3-year term in 1947)		
-	Akira Ono (Ind.) (Note: Later joined Ryokufūkai)	Hisashi Yamazaki (Ind.) (Note: Later joined Kaishintō)	1947	Yoshiaki Tamaya (Liberal)	Ichiro Asai (Democratic)	-
-	Akira Ono (Ind.)	Hisashi Yamazaki (Ind.)	1950	Kinsuke Kanō (Liberal) (Note: Died in office 5 December 1953)	Toshizō Tsuchiya (Note: Died in office 6 November 1950) (Liberal)	-
-	Akira Ono (Ind.)	Hisashi Yamazaki (Ind.)	1950 by-election (Note: Held 13 December 1950)	Kinsuke Kanō (Liberal)	Fumie Kataoka (Social Democratic)	-
-	Kan Kase (Ind.) (Note: Joined the Leftist Socialist Party then the Social Democratic Party during his first term)	Tamenosuke Kawaguchi (Liberal)	1953	Kinsuke Kanō (Liberal)	Fumie Kataoka (Social Democratic)	-
-	Kan Kase (Ind.)	Tamenosuke Kawaguchi (Liberal)	1954 by-election (Note: Held 20 January 1954)	Shigejiro Inō (Liberal)	Fumie Kataoka (Social Democratic)	-
-	Kan Kase (Ind.)	Tamenosuke Kawaguchi (Liberal)	1956	Shigejirō Inō (Note: Resigned 27 October 1960) (LDP)	Fumie Kataoka (Social Democratic)	-
-	Kan Kase (Social Democratic)	Kyūtarō Ozawa (Note: Died in office 18 September 1967) (LDP)	1959	Shigejirō Inō (LDP)	Fumie Kataoka (Social Democratic)	-
-	Kan Kase (Social Democratic)	Kyūtarō Ozawa (LDP)	1960 by-election (Note: Held 1 December 1960)	Yoshio Kijima (LDP)	Fumie Kataoka (Social Democratic)	-
-	Kan Kase (Social Democratic)	Kyūtarō Ozawa (LDP)	1962	Yoshio Kijima (LDP)	Akio Yanaoka (Social Democratic)	-
-	Kan Kase (Social Democratic)	Kyūtarō Ozawa (LDP)	1965	Yoshio Kijima (LDP)	Akio Yanaoka (Social Democratic)	-
-	Kan Kase (Social Democratic)	Gisaku Sugeno (Note: Died in office 25 January 1981) (LDP)	1967 by-election (Note: Held 5 November 1967)	Yoshio Kijima (LDP)	Akio Yanaoka (Social Democratic)	-
-	Kan Kase (Social Democratic)	Gisaku Sugeno (LDP)	1968	Yoshio Kijima (LDP)	Ichitaro Watanabe (LDP)	-
-	Kan Kase (Social Democratic)	Gisaku Sugeno (LDP)	1971	Yoshio Kijima (LDP)	Ichitaro Watanabe (LDP)	-
-	Kan Kase (Social Democratic)	Gisaku Sugeno (LDP)	1974	Takayoshi Takahashi (LDP)	Misao Akagiri (Social Democratic)	-
-	Kan Kase (Social Democratic)	Gisaku Sugeno (LDP)	1977	Takayoshi Takahashi (LDP)	Misao Akagiri (Social Democratic)	-
-	Kan Kase (Social Democratic)	Gisaku Sugeno (LDP)	1980	Yutaka Inoue (Note: Resigned 8 May 2002) (LDP)	Misao Akagiri (Social Democratic)	-
-	Kan Kase (Social Democratic)	Sōichi Usui (LDP)	1981 by-election (Note: Held 8 March 1981)	Yutaka Inoue (LDP)	Misao Akagiri (Social Democratic)	-
-	Yaeko Itohisa (Social Democratic)	Hiroyuki Kurata (LDP)	1983	Yutaka Inoue (LDP)	Misao Akagiri (Social Democratic)	-
-	Yaeko Itohisa (Social Democratic)	Hiroyuki Kurata (LDP)	1986	Yutaka Inoue (LDP)	Misao Akagiri (Social Democratic)	-
-	Yaeko Itohisa (Social Democratic)	Hiroyuki Kurata (LDP)	1989	Yutaka Inoue (LDP)	Misao Akagiri (Social Democratic)	-
-	Yaeko Itohisa (Social Democratic)	Hiroyuki Kurata (LDP)	1992	Yutaka Inoue (LDP)	Misao Akagiri (Social Democratic)	-
-	Ryōzō Iwase (New Frontier)	Hiroyuki Kurata (LDP)	1995	Yutaka Inoue (LDP)	Misao Akagiri (Social Democratic)	-
-	Ryōzō Iwase (New Frontier)	Hiroyuki Kurata (LDP)	1998	Yutaka Inoue (LDP)	Wakako Hironaka (Ind.) (Note: Joined the DPJ after the election)	-
-	Akira Imaizumi (DPJ)	Hiroyuki Kurata (LDP)	2001	Yutaka Inoue (LDP)	Wakako Hironaka (Ind.)	-
-	Akira Imaizumi (DPJ)	Hiroyuki Kurata (LDP)	2002 by-election (Note: Held 27 October 2002)	Kazuyasu Shiina (LDP)	Wakako Hironaka (Ind.)	-
-	Akira Imaizumi (DPJ)	Hiroyuki Kurata (LDP)	2004	Kazuyasu Shiina (LDP)	Wakako Hironaka (DPJ)	-
Ken Kagaya (DPJ)	Hiroyuki Nagahama (DPJ)	Junichi Ishii (LDP)	2007	Kazuyasu Shiina (LDP)	Wakako Hironaka (DPJ)	-
Ken Kagaya (DPJ)	Hiroyuki Nagahama (DPJ)	Junichi Ishii (LDP)	2010	Hiroyuki Konishi (DPJ)	Kuniko Inoguchi (LDP)	Kenichi Mizuno (Your Party)
Junichi Ishii (LDP)	Toshirō Toyoda (LDP)	Hiroyuki Nagahama (DPJ)	2013	Hiroyuki Konishi (DPJ)	Kuniko Inoguchi (LDP)	Kenichi Mizuno (Your Party)
Junichi Ishii (LDP)	Toshirō Toyoda (LDP)	Hiroyuki Nagahama (DPJ)	2016	Kuniko Inoguchi (LDP)	Taichirō Motoe (LDP)	Hiroyuki Konishi (DPJ)
Junichi Ishii (LDP)	Hiroyuki Nagahama (CDP)	Toshirō Toyoda (LDP)	2019	Kuniko Inoguchi (LDP)	Taichirō Motoe (LDP)	Hiroyuki Konishi (DPJ)
Junichi Ishii (LDP)	Hiroyuki Nagahama (CDP)	Toshirō Toyoda (LDP)	2022	Shoichi Usui (LDP)	Kuniko Inoguchi (LDP)	Hiroyuki Konishi (CDP)

== Election results ==
2025: Chiba at-large 3 seats
Party	Candidate	Votes	%	±%
DPP	Sayaka Kobayashi	531,580	18.75	▲12.39
CDP	Hiroyuki Nagahama	500,096	17.64	▼0.98
LDP	Junichi Ishii	431,330	15.22	▼10.63
Sanseitō	Megu Nakaya	405,400	14.30	▲10.91
LDP	Toshirō Toyoda	277,723	9.80	▼13.33
Reiwa	Natsumi Yamamoto	186,851	6.59	new
JCP	Chiyo Shiraishi	135,751	4.79	▼2.86
Ishin	Sadamichi Ishizuka	123,104	4.34	▼5.55
Independent	Yūya Ōsuki	72,154	2.55	new
Team Mirai	Shūhei Kobayashi	68,363	2.41	new
Independent	Kyōko Ōtsuka	24,810	0.88	new
Japan Reform Party	Naohisa Hashimoto	22,341	0.79	new
Anti-NHK	Hiroshigi Tamamoto	21,569	0.76	▼0.35
Independent	Tomaki Nakano	15,380	0.54	new
Nihon Kaikaku	Yoshimasa Eda	9,476	0.33	new
Japan Family Party	Hiroshi Ogasawara	8,652	0.31	new
Turnout			55.73	▲5.73
Registered electors		5,250,052		
Party total seats		Won	Total	Change
Liberal Democratic		1	3	▼1
Constitutional Democratic		1	2	Steady
Democratic Party For the People		1	1	▲1

2022
Party	Candidate	Votes	%
LDP	Shoichi Usui (Endorsed by Komeito)	656,952	25.85
LDP	Kuniko Inoguchi (Endorsed by Komeito)	587,809	23.13
CDP	Hiroyuki Konishi (Endorsed by the SDP)	473,175	18.62
Ishin	Masato Sano	251,416	9.89
JCP	Kazuko Saito	194,475	7.65
DPP	Hirokazu Isobe	161,648	6.36
Sanseitō	Ryota Shiina	86,147	3.39
Anti-NHK	Noriko Nakamura	28,295	
Happiness Realization	Hiroko Nanami	22,834	0.9
Liberal Republican Party	Sakurako Uda	18,791	0.74
New Party Kunimori	Mari Azusa	18,329	0.72
Anti-NHK	Nobuhiro Watanabe	17,511	0.69
Anti-NHK	Ryo Sudara	13,016	0.51
Japan First	Megumi Kiuchi	10,922	0.43
Turnout		2,705,602	50.01
Total valid votes		2,607,139#	96.36
Rejected ballots		98,463	3.64
LDP hold			
LDP hold			
CDP gain from Democratic			

2019
Party	Candidate	Votes	%
LDP	Kuniko Inoguchi (Endorsed by Komeito)	698,993	30.54
CDP	Hiroyuki Nagahama (Endorsed by the DPP and the SDP)	661,224	28.89
LDP	Toshiro Toyoda (Endorsed by Komeito)	436,182	19.06
JCP	Fumiko Asano	359,854	15.72
Anti-NHK	Masayuki Hiratsuka	89,941	3.93
Euthanasia Party	Masanori Kadota	42,643	1.86
Turnout		2,374,919	45.28
Total valid votes		2,288,837	96.37
Rejected ballots		86,082	3.63
LDP hold			
CDP gain from LDP			
LDP gain from Democratic			

2016
Party	Candidate	Votes	%
LDP	Kuniko Inoguchi	760,093	29.15
LDP	Taichirō Motoe	577,392	22.15
Democratic	Hiroyuki Konishi	472,219	18.11
JCP	Fumiko Asano	359,854	15.72
Democratic	Kenichi Mizuno	314,670	12.07
Independent	Masao Takahashi	57,329	2.20
Japanese Kokoro	Naritomo Katori	50,098	1.92
Happiness Realization	Yuzo Furukawa	23,777	0.91
Registered electors		5,201,477	
Turnout		2,705,602	52.02
Total valid votes		2,607,139	96.36
Rejected ballots		98,463	3.64
LDP gain from Democratic			
LDP hold			
Democratic gain from Your			

2013
Party	Candidate	Votes	%
LDP	Junichi Ishii (endorsed by Komeito)	680,706	28.5
LDP	Toshiro Toyoda (endorsed by Komeito)	418,806	17.5
Democratic	Hiroyuki Nagahama	388,529	16.3
Your	Masahiro Terada	285,007	11.9
JCP	Satoshi Terao	232,477	9.7
Restoration	Hiroki Hanazaki	186,259	7.8
People's Life	Kazumi Ota	148,240	6.2
Ishin Seito Shimpu	Yuichi Watanabe	39,147	1.6
Happiness Realization	Hironori Matsushima	9,227	0.4
Turnout			

2010
Party	Candidate	Votes	%
Democratic	Hiroyuki Konishi (endorsed by People's New Party)	35,632	20.2
LDP	Kuniko Inoguchi	513,772	19.3
Your	Kenichi Mizuko	476,259	17.9
Democratic	Ayumi Michi	463,648	17.4
LDP	Kazuyasu Shiina	395,746	14.9
JCP	Kazuko Saito	163,803	6.2
New Renaissance	Hisashi Koga	66,384	2.5
Sunrise	Satoshi Shimizu	29,926	1.1
Happiness Realization	Masahiko Makino	12,669	0.5
Turnout			

2007
Party	Candidate	Votes	%
Democratic	Hiroyuki Nagahama	666,241	25.2
LDP	Junichi Ishii (endorsed by Komeito)	541,701	20.5
Democratic	Ken Kagaya	477,402	18.1
LDP	Takaki Shirasuka (endorsed by Komeito)	387,395	14.7
JCP	Fumiko Asano	214,991	8.1
Independent	Susumu Honma	130,364	4.9
Social Democratic	Kazumi Aoki	124,113	4.7
People's New	Michiko Iwabuchi	99,316	3.8
Turnout			

2004
Party	Candidate	Votes	%
Democratic	Wakako Hironaka	1,187,663	49.1
LDP	Kazuyasu Shiina (endorsed by Komeito)	944,231	39.0
JCP	Fumiko Asano	288,072	11.9
Turnout			

2002 By-Election
Party	Candidate	Votes	%
LDP	Kazuyasu Shiina	509,688	45.1
Clean Chiba Political Roundtable	Yasuhito Wakai	422,185	37.4
JCP	Fumiko Asano	197,699	17.5
Turnout			39.61

== See also ==
- List of districts of the House of Councillors of Japan
