= Kenichi Mizuno =

Japanese politician (born 1966)

- 水野 賢一
- Official portrait, 2006

Member of the House of Councillors
- In office 26 July 2010 – 25 July 2016
- Preceded by: Seat established
- Succeeded by: Taichirō Motoe
- Constituency: Chiba at-large

Member of the House of Representatives; from Southern Kanto
- In office 16 March 1999 – 21 July 2009
- Preceded by: Kazuya Ishibashi
- Succeeded by: Sōichirō Okuno
- Constituency: PR block (1999–2000); Chiba 9th (2000–2009)

Personal details
- Born: 21 July 1966 (age 60) Minato, Tokyo, Japan
- Party: Democratic (2016)
- Other political affiliations: LDP (1996–2010); Your Party (2010–2014); Independent (2014–2016)
- Parent: Eiichi Nakao (father)
- Education: Waseda University

Kenichi Mizuno (水野 賢一, Mizuno Ken'ichi; born 21 July 1966) is a former Japanese politician of Your Party, formerly of the Liberal Democratic Party, who served as a member of the House of Councillors and the House of Representatives in the Diet (national legislature). A native of Tokyo and graduate of Waseda University, he was elected to the House of Representatives for the first time in 1999 after an unsuccessful run in 1996.

He ran in House of Councillors election in 2010 as a candidate of Your Party and won.
