= Wakako Hironaka =

Japanese writer and politician

- 広中 和歌子
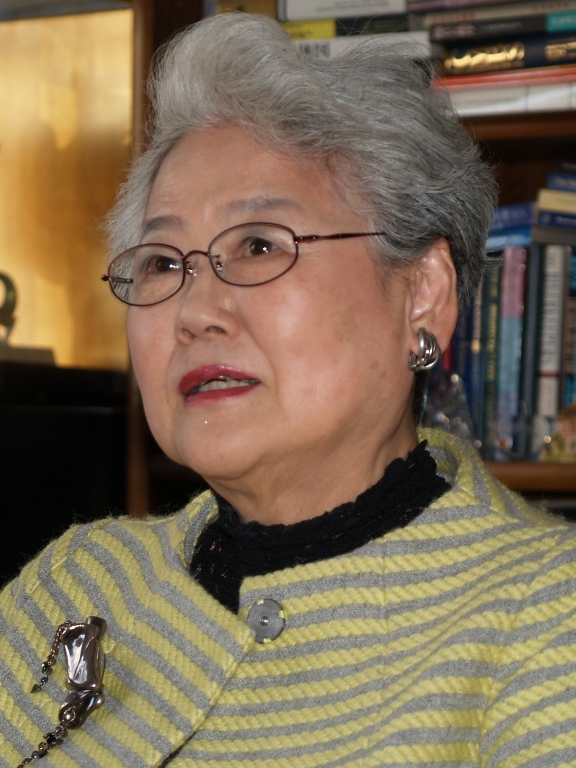
- Hironaka in 2010

Director-General of the Environmental Agency
- In office 9 August 1993 – 28 April 1994
- Prime Minister: Morihiro Hosokawa
- Preceded by: Taikan Hayashi
- Succeeded by: Toshiko Hamayotsu

Member of the House of Councillors
- In office 8 July 1986 – 25 July 2010
- Preceded by: Constituency established
- Succeeded by: Hiroyuki Konishi
- Constituency: National PR (1986–1998); Chiba at-large (1998–2010)

Personal details
- Born: 11 May 1934 (age 92) Tokyo, Japan
- Party: DPP (since 2018)
- Other political affiliations: CGP (1986–1994); NFP (1994–1998); GGP (1998); DPJ (1998–2016); DP (2016–2018)
- Spouse: Heisuke Hironaka (m. 1960)
- Children: 2
- Education: Brandeis University

Wakako Hironaka (広中 和歌子, Hironaka Wakako; born 11 May 1934, Tokyo) is a Japanese writer and politician. She served four terms in the House of Councillors, the upper house of the national Diet, from 1986 until 2010. Her husband is Heisuke Hironaka, a mathematician.

== Political career ==
Hironaka was first elected to the House of Councillors from the national proportional representation block at the 1986 election as a member of the Komeito party. She was re-elected to a second term as a national PR member at the 1992 election. Between 1993-1994, she was State Minister, Director-General of the Environment Agency in the Hosokawa Cabinet.

Following the breakup of Komeito in 1994, Hironaka was part of the group that formed the New Frontier Party, which itself dissolved in 1997. She contested the Chiba at-large district as an independent at the 1998 election, winning one of the district's two seats. She subsequently joined the Democratic Party of Japan and served as one of the party's vice presidents on several occasions. Hironaka won a second term as a Councillor for Chiba at the 2004 election, this time as an official DPJ candidate. At the July 2010 election, Chiba's representation was expanded to three seats, however the 76 year-old Hironaka was replaced as a DPJ candidate by the younger Hiroyuki Konishi and Ayumi Michi, who finished first and fourth in the ballot respectively. Hironaka contested the election from the national PR block. She was listed 39th on the DPJ's party ticket in the contest for 48 seats, making it realistically impossible for her to retain a seat. The party received enough votes for 16 seats in the election, ending Hironaka's career in the Diet.

During her time in the Diet, Hironaka also served as Director of the Research Committee on International Affairs and Global Warming Issues and a Member of both the Committee on Environment and Official Development Assistance and Related Matters. She has been active internationally, as Vice Chair of Global Environmental Action (GEA), an organizing member of Micro Credit Summit, a member of World Commission on Forests and Sustainable Development, Earth Charter Commission, and Teri (The Energy and Resources Institute)

Hironaka received a B.A. in English from Ochanomizu Women's University and an M.A. in Anthropology from Brandeis University. She has written several books, essays, translations, and critiques on education, culture, society, and women's issues.

== Other activities ==
Party Affiliation and Position Standing

- Officer, Democratic Party of Japan
- Membership, House Committees Chair, Research Committee on Economy, Industry and Employment
- Member, Committee on Education, Culture, and Science.
- Membership, International Organizations Vice-Chair, Global Environmental Action (GEA)
- Vice-Chair, GLOBE Japan (Global Legislators Organization for a Balanced Environment)
- Co-Chair, Council of Parliamentarians, Micro Credit Summit
- Member, WCFSD (World Commission on Forests and Sustainable Development)
- Member, Earth Charter Commission
- Member, Earth Charter International Council
- Chair, Committee for Promoting the Earth Charter in Japan and the Asia Pacific
- Member, International Scientific Advisory Board (ISAB), UNESCO
- Chair, PGA (Parliamentarians for Global Action) Japan National Committee
- Member, Governing Council, TERI The Energy Research Institute, New Delhi, India
- Member, UNEP Sasakawa Prize Jury

Former Roles

- Sept. 2005 – Sept. 2006: Vice President, Democratic Party of Japan
- June 1996 - Jan. 1997: Chairperson, House Special Committee on Science and Technology
- Aug. 1995 - June 1996: Shadow Cabinet Minister of Environment Policy, New Frontier Party
- Aug. 1993 - Apr. 1994: State Minister, Director General of the Environment Agency
- Apr. 1993 - Aug. 1993: President, GLOBE Japan (Global Legislators Organization for a Balanced Environment)

== Bibliography ==
In Japanese

- Futatsu no Bunka no Aida de (二つの文化の間で, Between Two Cultures) 1979
- Josei no Shigoto to Katei (Woman-Her Work and Family) 1981
- Tsugi no Sedai ni Nani wo nokosu ka (What Values Should We Leave for the Future Generations?) 1982
- Amerika ha Nihon ni nani wo nozon de iru ka, Gikai kara no Koe (What America Wants from Japan, Voices from the American Congress) 1987
- Seiji ha wakaranai (Politics is Unexpectedly Interesting) 1989

Translations into Japanese

- Shifting Gears, George & Nina O'Neill, 1975
- Japan as Number One, Ezra Vogel with A. Kimoto, 1979
- Samurai & Silk, Haru M. Reischauer, 1987

Translations from Japanese to English

- Hanaoka Seisyuu no Tsuma (華岡青洲の妻｜The Doctor's Wife) : Sawako Ariyoshi, 1978 (with Ann Siller Kostant)
- Ameyuki-san, Tomoko Yamazaki, 1986
