= Sayako =

- Pronunciation: [sa.ja.ko]
- Gender: Female

Origin
- Origin: Japanese
- Meaning: Depends on kanji
- Region of origin: Japan

Sayako (written: 清子 or 紗冶子) is a feminine Japanese given name. Notable people with the name include:

- Sayako Kuroda (黒田 清子; born 1969), a former princess of the Japanese Imperial Family, daughter and youngest child of Emperor Akihito
- Sayako Ito (伊東 紗冶子; born 1994), Japanese television personality
- Sayako Kishimoto (岸本 清子; 1939-1988), Japanese artist
- Sayako Kuramoto (倉本 清子; born 1983), Japanese actress

== See also ==
- Sayaka
- Sayoko
