= Mary Schaps =

Israeli mathematician and novelist

- מלכה אלישבע שפס
- Born: Mary Elizabeth Kramer; August 6, 1948 (age 78); Cleveland, Ohio, U.S.
- Education: Swarthmore College (BA); Harvard University (MA, PhD)
- Spouse: David Schaps (m. 1968)
- Children: Two
- Scientific career
- Fields: Theoretical mathematics
- Thesis: Non-singular deformations of space curves, using determinantal schemes (1972)
- Doctoral advisor: David Mumford; Heisuke Hironaka

Mary Elizabeth Schaps (Hebrew: מלכה אלישבע שפס; born August 6, 1948), also known as Malka Elisheva Schaps, is an Israeli-American mathematician. She is Professor of Mathematics and Dean of the Faculty of Exact Sciences at Bar Ilan University. She received her Ph.D. from Harvard University, and has published in deformation theory, group theory, and representation theory. She is also a writer, authoring several novels under the pseudonym Rachel Pomerantz.

== Early and personal life ==
Mary Elizabeth Kramer was born on August 6, 1948, in Cleveland, Ohio, United States. From 1965 to 1969, she was educated at Swarthmore College in Pennsylvania, majoring in mathematics, philosophy and history, and graduating summa cum laude in 1969. She then attended Harvard University as a mathematics graduate student: she completed her Master of Arts (MA) degree in 1971 and her Doctor of Philosophy (PhD) degree in 1972. Her doctoral thesis was titled "Non-singular deformations of space curves, using determinantal schemes": her advisors were David Mumford and Heisuke Hironaka.

She was brought up a Presbyterian and then a Unitarian Universalism. She became interested in Judaism, and formally converted to Conservative Judaism in college. In 1968, she married David Schaps, a classics professor who was then also studying for a PhD at Harvard. They both gradually felt more and more drawn to Orthodox Judaism and considered themselves Haredi by the time they had completed their doctorates. The couple made aliyah (moved to Israel) in 1972.

Together, she and her husband had two children: this was a small family by Haredi standards, and they raised four more foster children. They live in Bnei Brak, a Haredi city near Tel Aviv.

== Career ==
Schaps had some teaching experience at Harvard University: she was teaching assistant from 1971 to 1972, and a lecturer at the 1975 Harvard Summer School. In 1972, having moved to Israel, she was appointed a lecturer in mathematics at Tel Aviv University. In her second year in Israel the Yom Kippur War occurred: the change in language, culture and the threat to her new family were a shock. In 1977, she moved to Bar-Ilan University as a senior lecturer: she was promoted to associate professor in 1991 and full professor in 2006. She was the only female Haredi professor in Israel. In October 2013, she was appointed Dean of Exact Sciences at Bar-Ilan University: having been the only female Haredi professor, she now became the highest ranking Haredi woman in Israeli academia. She stepped down as dean in 2015, and was made Professor Emeritus on retirement in 2016.

== Selected publications ==
- Kanovei, Vladimir; Katz, Karin U.; Katz, Mikhail G.; Schaps, Mary (2015), "Proofs and Retributions, Or: Why Sarah Can't Take Limits", Foundations of Science, 20: 1–25, doi:10.1007/s10699-013-9340-0, S2CID 123352636.
- Katz, Mikhail G.; Schaps, Mary; Vishne, Uzi. Logarithmic growth of systole of arithmetic Riemann surfaces along congruence subgroups. J. Differential Geom. 76 (2007), no. 3, 399–422.
- Schaps, Mary. Deformations of Cohen–Macaulay schemes of codimension 2 and non-singular deformations of space curves. Amer. J. Math. 99 (1977), no. 4, 669–685.
- Schaps, Mary; Zakay-Illouz, Evelyne. Combinatorial partial tilting complexes for the Brauer star algebras. Representations of algebras (São Paulo, 1999), 187–207, Lecture Notes in Pure and Appl. Math., 224, Dekker, New York, 2002.
