= Taichirō Motoe =

Japanese politician

- 元榮 太一郎
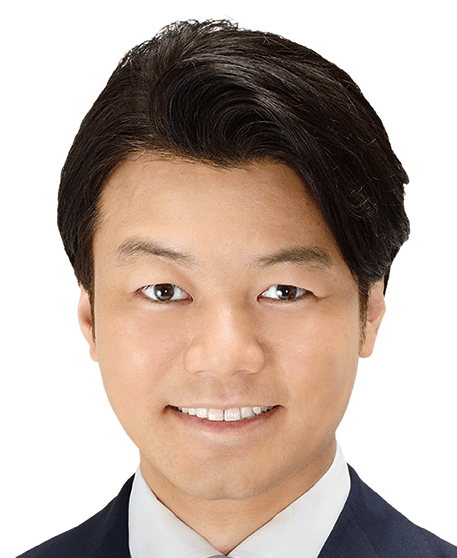
- Official portrait, 2016

Member of the House of Councillors
- In office 26 July 2016 – 25 July 2022
- Preceded by: Kenichi Mizuno
- Succeeded by: Shoichi Usui
- Constituency: Chiba at-large

Personal details
- Born: 14 December 1975 (age 50) Illinois, U.S.
- Party: Liberal Democratic
- Education: Keio University

Taichirō Motoe (born December 14, 1975) is a Japanese politician who is a member of the House of Councillors of Japan.

== Career ==
He was elected in 2016.
