= Kazuyasu Shiina =

Japanese politician

- 椎名 一保
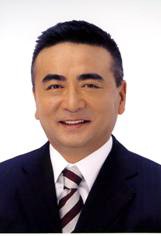
- Official portrait, 2006

Member of the House of Councillors
- In office 28 October 2002 – 25 July 2010
- Preceded by: Yutaka Inoue
- Succeeded by: Kuniko Inoguchi
- Constituency: Chiba at-large

Member of the Chiba Prefectural Assembly
- In office 23 April 1987 – 10 October 2002
- Constituency: Chōshi City

Personal details
- Born: 15 January 1952 (age 74) Chōshi, Chiba, Japan
- Party: Liberal Democratic
- Relatives: Takashi Shiina (grandfather)
- Education: Nihon University

Kazuyasu Shiina (椎名 一保, Shiina Kazuyasu; born January 15, 1952) is a Japanese politician of the Liberal Democratic Party and a member of the House of Councillors in the Diet (national legislature). After living in Choshi, Chiba and graduating from Nihon University, he was elected to the House of Councillors for the first time in 2002 after serving in the assembly of Chiba Prefecture for four terms.
