= Hiroyuki Konishi (politician, born 1972) =

Japanese politician (born 1972)

- 小西 洋之
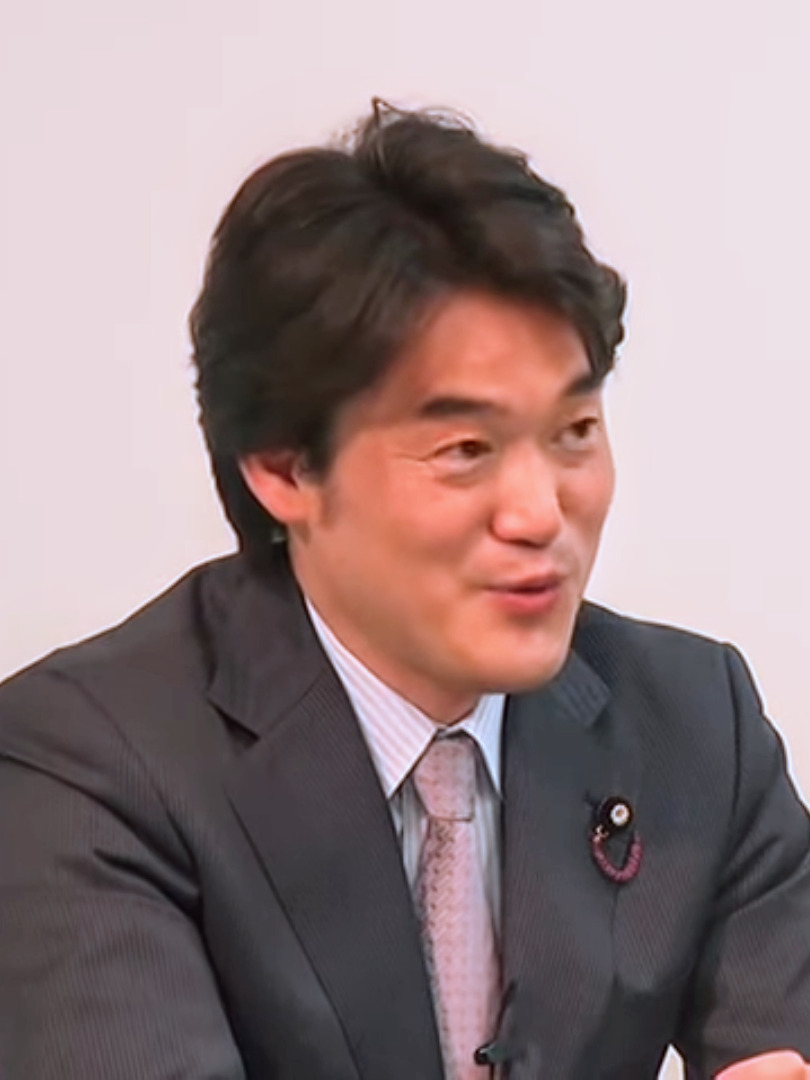
- Konishi in 2014

Member of the House of Councillors
- Incumbent
- Assumed office 26 July 2010
- Preceded by: Wakako Hironaka
- Constituency: Chiba at-large

Personal details
- Born: 28 January 1972 (age 54) Tokushima City, Tokushima, Japan
- Party: CDP (since 2020)
- Other political affiliations: DPJ (2009–2016); DP (2016–2018); Independent (2018–2020)
- Education: Columbia University; University of Tokyo

Hiroyuki Konishi (小西洋之, Konishi Hiroyuki; born 28 January 1972) is a Japanese politician serving as a member of the House of Councillors since 2010. He has served as chairman of the land, infrastructure, transport and tourism committee since 2024.
