= Satoshi Suzuki (mathematician) =

Japanese mathematician (1930–1991)

- Born: June 24, 1930; Nagoya, Japan
- Died: August 11, 1991 (aged 61); Kyoto, Japan
- Citizenship: Japan
- Education: Kyoto University
- Scientific career
- Fields: algebraic geometry
- Workplaces: Kyoto University; Kyoto Women's University; Momoyama Gakuin University; Florida State University; Purdue University; Queen's University at Kingston; Rutgers University
- Doctoral advisor: Yasuo Akizuki

Satoshi Suzuki (24 June 1930 – 11 August 1991) was a Japanese mathematician, and a professor at Kyoto University.

== Academic works ==
- "On m-adic Differentials" is cited by 5 articles.
- "Higher differential algebras of discrete valuation rings" is cited by "Regular local rings essentially of finite type over fields of prime characteristic", Mamoru Furuya a, Hiroshi Niitsuma, Journal of Algebra 306 (2006) 703–711.
- 5 articles written by Suzuki are cited in the textbook "Homologie des algèbres commutatives".

== Life ==
Satoshi Suzuki was born on 24 June 1930 in Nagoya. He entered Kyoto University in 1949. He studied mathematics in his undergraduate cours. His adviser in graduate course was Yasuo Akizuki from 1953 to 1958, but his research ideas were developed by his own. He wrote a paper "Note on the existence of rational points" published in the Proceedings of the Japan Academy in 1958.

- 1958 - 59 taught at Kyoto Women's University
- 1959 - 61 taught at Momoyama Gakuin, Sakai, Osaka
- 1963 associate professor at Kyoto University
- 1964 submitted his doctoral thesis "Some results on m-adic differentials" to Kyoto University
- 1965 - 67 Purdue University, West Lafayette, Indiana, USA
- 1967 - 68 Queen's University, Kingston, Canada
- 1970 full professor at Kyoto University

Paulo Ribenboim wrote about Suzuki that "I was very interested in his work on differentials, especially the higher order differentials and I attended his lectures with profit. At my suggestion, Suzuki wrote up his lecture notes ...."

== Doctoral thesis ==
- Some results on m-adic differentials, Kyoto University, 1964.

== Research articles ==
- Note on the existence of rational points, Proceedings of the Japan Academy, 1958.
- On m-adic Differentials, J. Sci. Hiroshima Univ. Ser. A, Vol.24, No.3, December, 1960.
- Some results on Hausdorff m-adic modules and m-adic differentials, J.Math. Kyoto Univ. 2-2 (1963) 157–182.
- On torsion of the module of differentials of a locality which is a complete intersection, 1965, cited by 15 including one textbook Homologie des algèbres commutatives.
- Note on formally projective modules, 1966, cited by 8
- On the Flatness of Complete Formally Projective Modules, 1968 JSTOR, cited by 2 including one textbook Homologie des algèbres commutatives.
- Differential modules and derivations of complete discrete valuation rings, 1969, cited by 4 including one textbook Homologie des algèbres commutatives.
- Modules of high order differentials of topological rings, 1970, cited by 1.
- On Neggers' numbers of discrete valuation rings, 1971, cited by 2.
- Differentials of commutative rings, 1971 - Kingston, Ont., Queen's University, cited by 14 including one textbook Homologie des algèbres commutatives.
- Corrections and supplements to my paper "Differential modules and derivations of complete discrete valuation rings", 1971
- A note on Malliavin's result, 1973
- Higher differential algebras of discrete valuation rings, 1974
- Higher differential algebras of discrete valuation rings, 1975
- Some types of derivations and their applications to field theory, 1981, cited by 16.
- On extensions of higher derivations for algebraic extensions of fields of positive characteristics, 1989

== Books ==
- Collected Papers of Satoshi Suzuki, 1994 - Kingston, Ont.: Queen's University
