= Takashi Inoguchi =

Japanese political scientist (1944–2024)

Takashi Inoguchi (猪口 孝, Inoguchi Takashi; 17 January 1944 – 27 November 2024) was a Japanese academic researcher of foreign affairs and international and global relationships of states. He was the president of the University of Niigata Prefecture, and a professor emeritus at the University of Tokyo.

== Education ==
Inoguchi was born in Niigata. After graduating from Niigata High School, he attended the University of Tokyo from 1962 to 1968, obtaining a bachelor's degree in liberal arts and master's degree in international relations. He studied at the Massachusetts Institute of Technology from 1968 to 1974 and obtained a Ph.D. in political science. Following his Ph.D., he taught at Sophia University from 1974 to 1977, and at the University of Tokyo from 1977 onward. He was also at the University of Geneva-affiliated Geneva Graduate Institute from 1977 to 1978, and at Harvard University from 1983 to 1984.

== Research papers and other activities ==
Inoguchi was a well-known author in Japan and had numerous books in print.

=== With no co-editorial ===
- Comparative Researches on the style of the state diplomacy - China, UK and Japan -: (1978)
- The figure of international politics and economic relations: (1982)
- The dragonfly and peas (In original, Tombo to Edamame, nani ga yume wo kanaeru no ka ): the realization of our dreams: (2005)

== Personal life and death ==
Inoguchi was married to the academic and politician Kuniko Yokota, who he met while at Sophia University.

On the evening of 27 November 2024, a fire broke out inside the apartment building in Bunkyo, Tokyo where the Inoguchi family was living. Inoguchi and his 33-year-old daughter died. The cause of the fire was under investigation, but police suspected the possibility of a crime was low and that the fire was accidental. A large number of books in the apartment may have contributed to the fire spreading quickly.

== Honours ==
- Japan: Order of the Sacred Treasure, Gold Rays with Neck Ribbon (2023)
