= Sayoko Eri =

Japanese artist

- 江里 佐代子
- Born: 19 July 1945; Kyoto Prefecture, Japan
- Died: 3 October 2007 (aged 62)
- Education: Seian College of Art and Design
- Known for: Kirikane

Sayoko Eri (江里 佐代子, Eri Sayoko; July 19, 1945 – October 3, 2007) was a Japanese kirikane artist. She was a Living National Treasure of Japan and a member of the Japan Kōgei Association. Her husband Kokei Eri is a Buddhist image sculptor. Her daughter is Kirikane artist Tomoko Eri. Her son is artist Naoki Eri.

== Biography ==
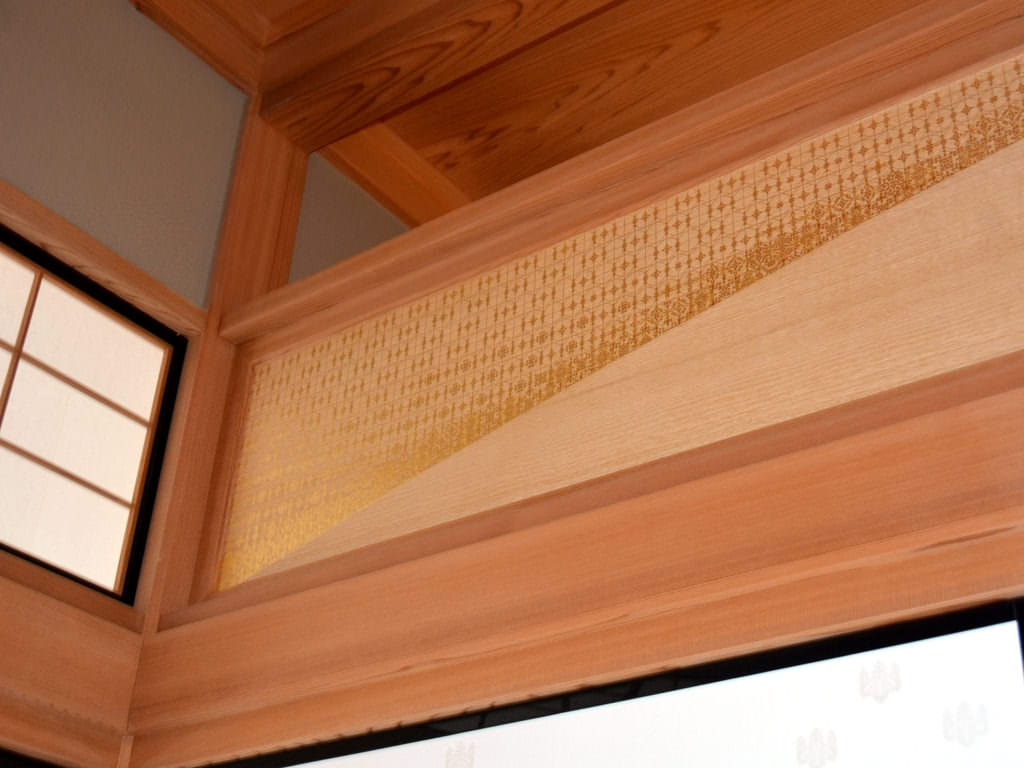
Kirikane works at the Kyoto State Guest House by Eri Sayoko

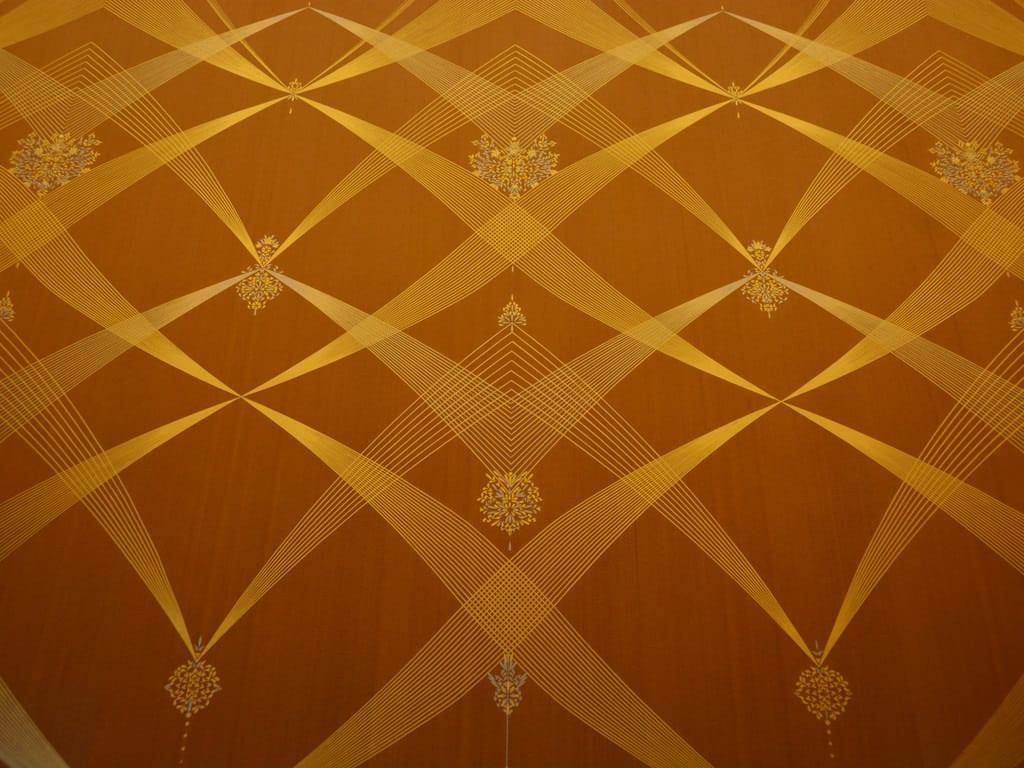
Kirikane works at the Kyoto State Guest House by Eri Sayoko

She was born into a family of Japanese embroiderers; she learned Japanese style of painting and dyeing. She started kirikane in 1974 after she married Kokei Eri, a sculptor of Buddhist images. Since acquiring the skill, she has tried to expand her scope as an artist, actively using the kirikane technique not only for traditional Buddhist images but for modern handicrafts as well. Her work includes objects such as boxes, trays, incense containers, green tea powder containers, plaques, wall decorations, folding screens and room dividers.

She had exhibited her works in private and public exhibitions. She won the President of Japan Art Crafts Association Prize, the grand prize of the exhibition, in 1991 and the Prince Takamatsu Memorial Prize in 2001. She had also won many prizes in the Kinki District exhibitions of Japanese Traditional Art Crafts Exhibitions and the Seventh Category exhibitions of Japanese Traditional Art Crafts Exhibitions. She participated in the decoration of the Kyoto State Guest House.

She was honoured as an Important Intangible Cultural Property, also known as Living National Treasure (Japan), on July 8, 2002, for her expertise and contributions in kirikane.

Eri Sayoko died unexpectedly on October 3, 2007, at the age of 62, in Amiens, France.

== Prizes ==
- Prize of 14th Japan Art Crafts Association in the Exhibition of Kinki District Japanese Traditional Art Crafts for "Octagonal box, Butterfly Fantasy" in 1985
- The Asahi Shimbun Prize in the 6th Exhibition of Nanabukai Japanese Traditional Art Crafts Association for "Ornamental small box, Blossoming" in 1990
- President Prize of 38th Japan Art Crafts Association in the Exhibition of Japanese Traditional Art Crafts for "Ornamental box, Flowering Art and Elegance" in 1991
- Prize of Japan Art Crafts Association in the 8th Exhibition of Nanabukai Japanese Traditional Art Crafts Association for "Ornamental small box, Fine Moment" in 1992
- Nihon Keizai Shimbun Prize in the 22nd Exhibitions of Kinki District Japanese Traditional Art Crafts for "Ornamental box, Blossoming Flower" in 1993
- Takamatsunomiya Commemorative Prize in the 48th Exhibition of Japanese Traditional Art Crafts for "Ornamental box, Silk Road Fantasy" in 2001
