= Junichi Ishii =

Japanese politician

- 石井 準一
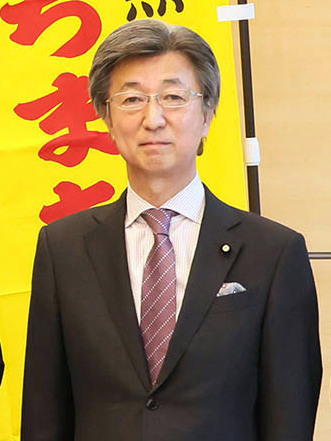
- Ishii in 2022

Member of the House of Councillors
- Incumbent
- Assumed office 29 July 2007
- Preceded by: Hiroyuki Kurata
- Constituency: Chiba at-large

Member of the Chiba Prefectural Assembly
- In office 1987–2007
- Constituency: Chōsei

Personal details
- Born: 23 November 1957 (age 68) Mobara, Chiba, Japan
- Party: Liberal Democratic

Junichi Ishii (石井 準一, Ishii Jun'ichi; born 1957) is a Japanese politician, currently a member of the House of Councillors in the Diet (Japanese national legislature). He is a member of the Liberal Democratic Party, and affiliated to the revisionist lobby Nippon Kaigi. A graduate of a high school in Chiba Prefecture, he served in the assembly of Chiba Prefecture since 2003, and was elected to the national House in 2007.

== Political career ==
- Secretary to a Member of the House of Representatives
- Prefectural Assembly member
- Chairperson, Committee on Budget, HC
- Chief Director, Committee on the Cabinet, HC
- Acting-Chairperson, LDP Diet Affairs Committee on the House of Councillors, LDP
- Acting Director, Cabinet Division, LDP

(source:)

House of Councillors
Preceded by Takamaro Fukuoka	Chairman of the Committee on Rules and Administration; 2022–2024	Succeeded by Keiichiro Asao
Party political offices
Preceded by Kotaro Nogami	Chairman of the Diet Affairs Committee for the Liberal Democratic Party in the House of Councillors; 2024—2025	Succeeded by Yoshihiko Isozaki
Preceded by Masaji Matsuyama	Secretary General for the Liberal Democratic Party in the House of Councillors; 2025—present	Incumbent
