= Sayaka Fukita =

Japanese actress

- 吹田 早哉佳
- Born: 23 June 1984 (age 42); Toyama, Toyama, Japan
- Occupation: Actress
- Years active: 2008–present
- Agent: Freelance
- Height: 160 cm (5 ft 3 in)
- Website: Official website

Sayaka Fukita (吹田 早哉佳, Fukita Sayaka; born 23 June 1984) is a Japanese actress from Toyama, Toyama who has acted in feature films, television series, radio shows and theater productions.

== Biography ==
- 2008; 3rd Toyama Regional Film Festival; she won the Grand Prix at the 1st Toyama Movie Debut Audition.
- She moved to Toyama Prefecture in January 2017. She also retired from Itoh Company and worked freelance.

'Tarento' Megumi Fukushita and model Yumi Seino were classmates from her high school days.

== Appearances ==
=== Films ===
- Kanna-san Daiseikō Desu! (2009)
- Mt. Tsurugidake (2009)
- Nippon no Dai Kazoku Saiko! The Large family Hōsō Kinshi Gekijō-ban (2009) – as Gon Urabayashi
- Shuffle (2011) as Yoko
- ItohTube Short Movie Collection Kappa Saratarō Shinnen no Creamer (Nov 2011, Argo Pictures)
- Milocrorze: A Love Story (2012)
- Highsay –Kamisama no Iutōri– (2012)

=== Television ===
- Untouchable no Makimaki de Yatte miyou!! (2008, ABC TV)
- Untouchable no Choi Maki de Yatte miyou!! (2008)
- Torihada—Yofukashi no anata ni Zokutto suru Hanashi o (2008, CX) as Yuka Sato
- Neconade (2008) as Emi Kanzaki
- Nanase futatabi (2008, NHK)
- SMAP×SMAP (15, 22 Jun 2008, 27 Sep 2010, CX)
- Love @ Party Perfume×Shin Owarai Sanjūshi (2 Jan 2009, NTV)
- Idol League! (2009–11, NTV/Nittele Plus)
- Marusummers (2010, TBS)
- Don! (3 Sep 2010, NTV)
- Pablok no Inu (2010–, TBS)
- Ramen Walker TV (2011, Fuji TV One Two)
- Yūmei Manga Jikken Gekijō Dekiru de Show!? (2013–, BeeTV) MC
- Koroshi no Joōbachi (2013, TX) as Mari

=== Radio ===
- Junju Takada-Michiko Kawai no Tokyo Paradise (1 Jan 2011, NCB)
- Madamada Gocha maze'! –Atsumare Yanyan– (16 Apr 2011 – 14 Apr 2012, MBS Radio)
- The Hit Studio –Let's Go Yanyan– (29 Oct 2011 – 13 Apr 2013, MBS Radio)

=== Stage ===
- Slow Rider 12th Performance Crows
- Vampire Hunter (22–26 Jun 2011, Sasazuka Factory) as Vericruz
- Shinobu's Brain in the Soup Full2: Pain (22–28 Dec 2011, Shimokitazawa Theatre 711)
- Nelke Planning Samurai7 (1–8 Apr 2012, Aoyama Theatre) as Shino
- Zero Mansion Ryūma ga ippai (11–14 Jul 2012, Sasazuka Factory) heroine: as Hatsune
- Nelke Planning Nazotoki wa Dinner no Ato de (31 Aug – 9 Sep 2012, Tennozu Ginga Theatre) as Mizuzaka
- Shinobu's Brain in the Soup Bomb: Drug Store (7–14 Jan 2013, Kichijoji Theatre)

=== Advertisements ===
- Sammy Corporation "Pachinko CR Hokuto no Kobushi" Toki-hen (2008)
- Willer Travel Willer Express (2009)
- Japan Tobacco Bunen News "Bunen Policy"-hen (2009)
- Kobayashi Pharmaceutical Nodonuru Nure Mask Kashitsu Virus Taisaku Futatsu no Barrier-hen
- Ebara Oishii Kimchi (2010)
- Jins Jins PC (2012)

=== Magazines ===
- Jimny Plus (No. 20 Jan 2008)
- Young Animal Arashi (No. 2 Apr 2010, Hakusensha)
- Young Animal (No. 9 Apr 2010, Hakusensha)
- Young Animal (No. 9 Jul 2010, Hakusensha)
- Flash (No. 21 Sep 2010, Kobunsha)
- Weekly Young Jump (No. 17 Mar 2011, Shueisha)
- Weekly Playboy (No. 24 Oct 2011, Shueisha)
- Bus Graphic (No. 30 Jun 2012, Neko Publishing)

=== DVD ===
- Naizō Ageage Taisō (2009)
- Plumeria (2010)
- Avanti (2011)

=== Others ===
- Original Drama Theater Koi no Paradora Episode 4 "Ashita mo Issho" heroine: as Miwa
- Chemistry 2010 Tour regeneration (Kiss kara Hajimeyou) music video heroine
