= Ken Kagaya (politician) =

Japanese politician

- 加賀谷 健
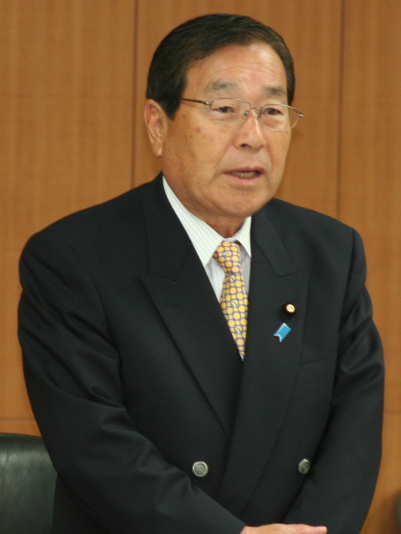
- Kagaya in 2011

Member of the House of Councillors
- In office 29 July 2007 – 28 July 2013
- Preceded by: Seat established
- Succeeded by: Toshirō Toyoda
- Constituency: Chiba at-large

Member of the Chiba Prefectural Assembly
- In office 1987–2007
- Constituency: Inage Ward, Chiba City

Personal details
- Born: 23 October 1943 Tomakomai, Hokkaido, Japan
- Died: 24 April 2014 (aged 70) Chūō, Chiba, Japan
- Party: Democratic (1998–2014)
- Other political affiliations: DSP (1987–1994); NFP (1994–1998)
- Education: Hokkaido Tomakomai Technical High School

Ken Kagaya (加賀谷 健, Kagaya Ken; October 23, 1943 – April 24, 2014) was a Japanese politician of the Democratic Party of Japan, a member of the House of Councillors in the Diet (national legislature). A native of Tomakomai, Hokkaidō and high school graduate, he had served in the assembly of Chiba Prefecture for five terms from 1987 to 2007. He was elected to the House of Councillors for the first time in 2007.
