= Sayaka Kobayashi (politician) =

Japanese politician (born 1983)

- 小林 さやか
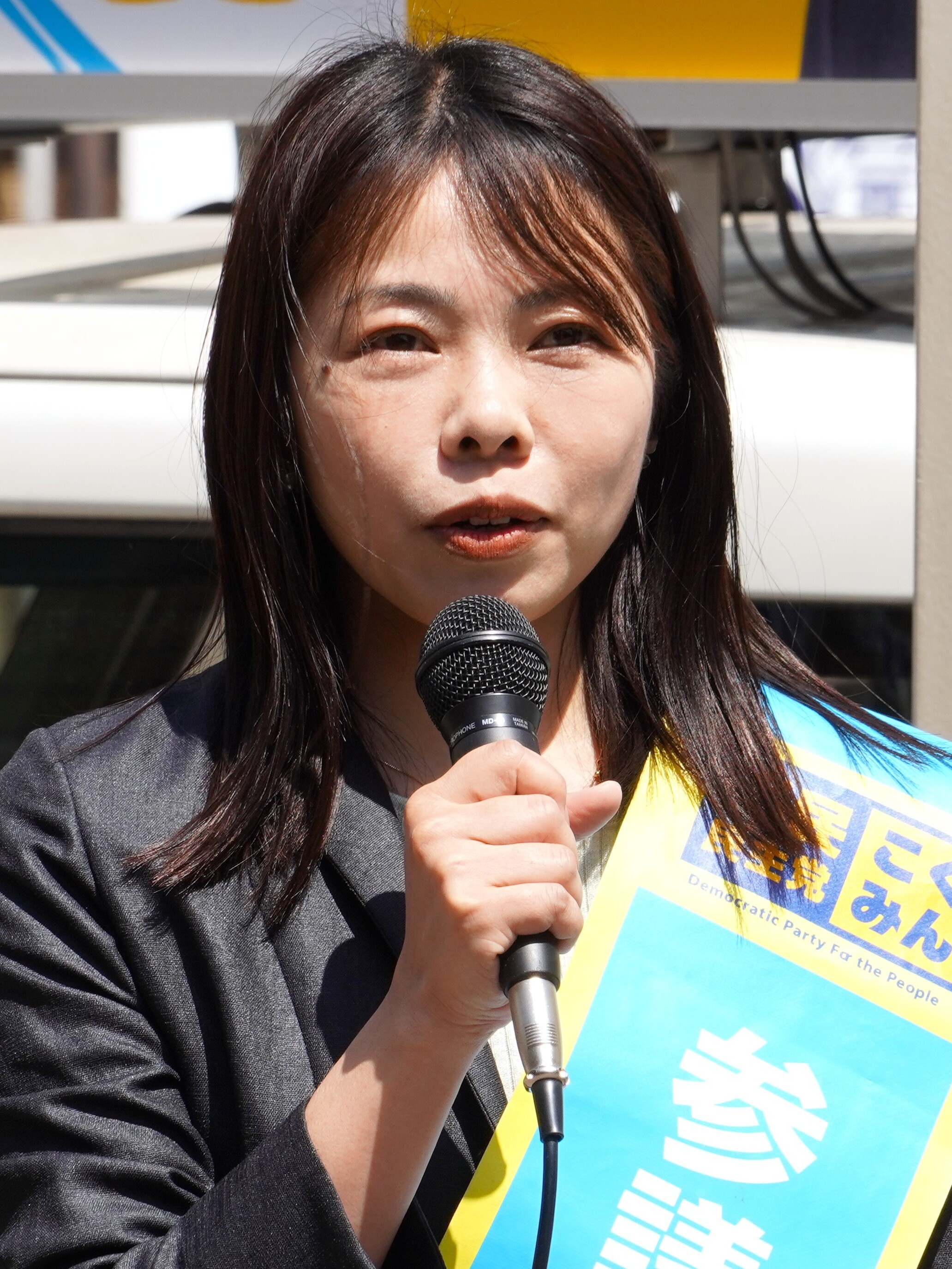
- Kobayashi in 2025

Member of the House of Councillors
- Incumbent
- Assumed office 29 July 2025
- Preceded by: Toshirō Toyoda
- Constituency: Chiba at-large

Personal details
- Born: 5 September 1983 (age 43) Ichikawa, Chiba, Japan
- Party: DPP
- Education: University of Tokyo

Sayaka Nakayama (中山 さやか, Nakayama Sayaka; born 5 September 1983), better known as Sayaka Kobayashi (小林さやか, Kobayashi Sayaka), is a Japanese politician serving as a member of the House of Councillors since 2025. From 2007 to 2025, she was a reporter for the NHK.
