= Hideyuki Matsumura =

Japanese mathematician (1930–1995)

Hideyuki Matsumura (松村 英之, 1930–1995) was a Japanese mathematician particularly known for his textbooks in commutative algebra. He received his Ph.D. in 1958 from Kyoto University under the advisory of mathematician Yasuo Akizuki.
