= Yasuo Akizuki =

Japanese mathematician

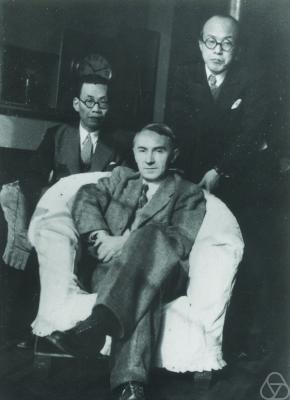
- Y. Akizuki, C. Chevalley and A. Kobori
- Born: August 23, 1902; Wakayama, Japan
- Died: July 11, 1984 (aged 81)
- Citizenship: Japan
- Education: Kyoto University
- Scientific career
- Fields: Algebraic geometry
- Workplaces: Kyoto University; Gunma University
- Doctoral advisor: Masazo Sono
- Doctoral students: Satoshi Suzuki; Hideyuki Matsumura

Yasuo Akizuki (23 August 1902 – 11 July 1984) was a Japanese mathematician. He was a professor at Kyoto University. Alongside Wolfgang Krull, Oscar Zariski, and Masayoshi Nagata, he is famous for his early work in commutative algebra. In particular, he is most well known in helping to demonstrate Akizuki–Hopkins–Levitzki theorem.

== Life ==
Yasuo Akizuki was born on 23 August 1902 in Wakayama. In 1926, Akizuki graduated Faculty of Mathematics, Department of Science, Kyoto Imperial University.

He was inaugurated as a professor of Kyoto University in 1948.

== See also ==
- Jacob Levitzki
