= Kazuko Saito =

Japanese politician

- 斉藤 和子

Member of the House of Representatives
- In office 19 December 2014 – 28 September 2017
- Constituency: Southern Kanto PR

Personal details
- Born: 29 September 1974 (age 52) Funabashi, Chiba, Japan
- Party: Communist
- Education: Nihon University

Kazuko Saito (Japanese: 斉藤 和子, Hepburn: Saitō Kazuko) is a member of the Japanese Communist Party serving in the House of Representatives as a representative of the Southern Kanto proportional representation block, a position she was elected to in 2014. She is against the Trans-Pacific Partnership, a proposal which she thinks will negatively affect farmers in Japan.
