= Ken Kagaya (artist) =

Japanese writer and painter

Ken Kagaya (加賀谷 研, July 15, 1944 – March 7, 2003) was a Japanese painter and writer. He was born in the Republic of China on July 15, 1944, and raised in Japan from 1945. He graduated from Faculty of Agriculture, Tohoku University. He died on March 7, 2003.

His father was Toshio Kagaya, a former Parliamentary Secretary for the Japanese Government, mining engineer, graduate of Akita University and mathematician. His mother was Sumino Kagaya.
