= Chiba Prefectural Assembly =

Prefectural parliament of Chiba Prefecture, Japan

Chiba Prefectural Assembly 千葉県議会

Type
- Type: Unicameral

Leadership
- Chairman: Mitsuyasu Shida, LDP
- Vice Chairman: Yoshikatsu Enosawa, LDP

Structure
- Seats: 94
- Political groups: Government (24) CDP/DPFP (17) Sensyokai (4) Simin Network (1) Heiwa no tou (1) Liberal Minsyu (1) Neutral (9) Kōmeitō (8) Chibakenmin no koe (1) Opposition (59) LDP (52) JCP (2) Independents (5)

Elections
- Last election: 7 April 2019

Meeting place
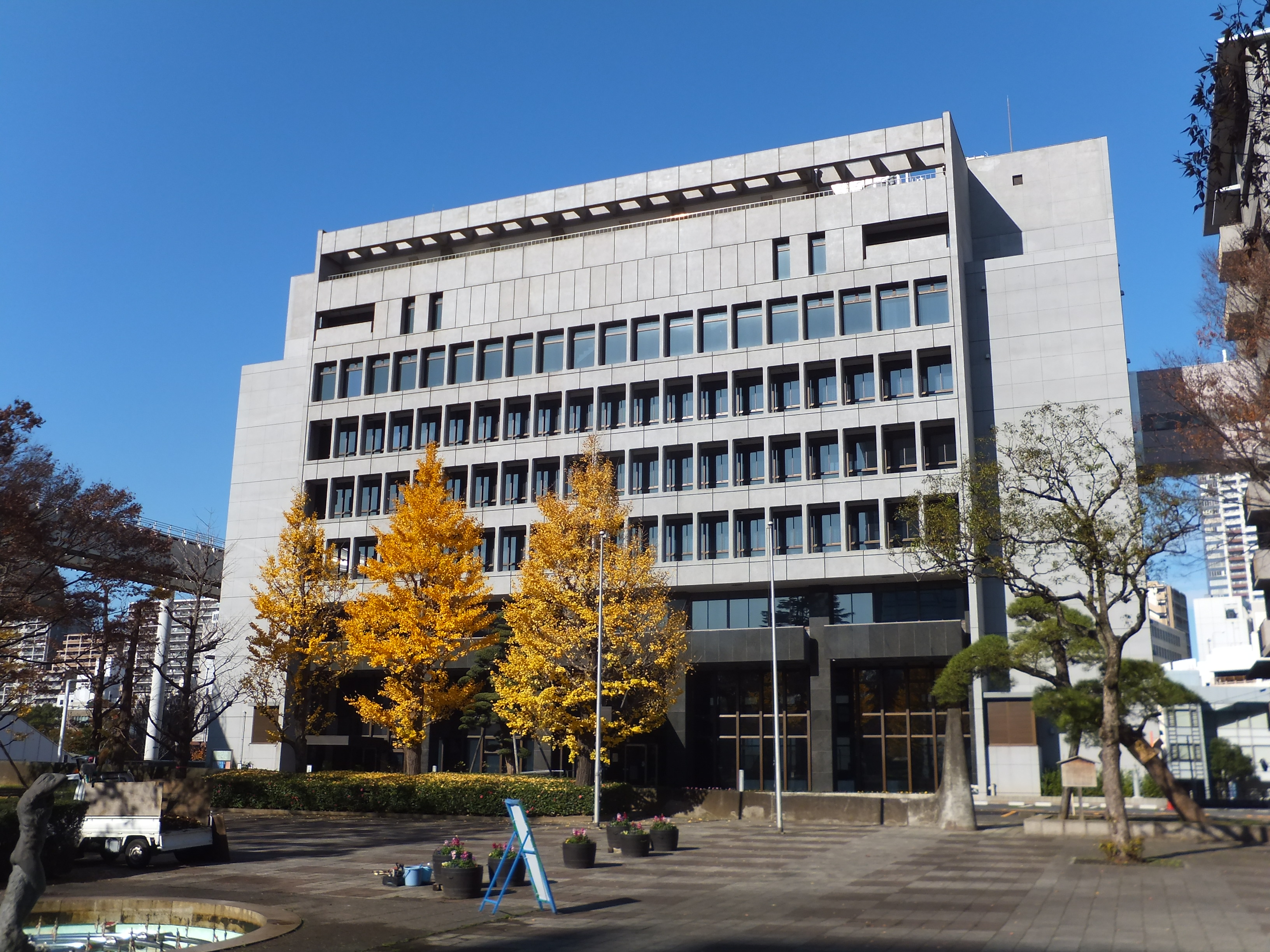

Website
- www.pref.chiba.lg.jp/gikai/

The Chiba Prefectural Assembly (千葉県議会, Chiba-ken Gikai) is the prefectural parliament of Chiba Prefecture.

== Current composition ==
As of 2021, the assembly was composed as follows:

Composition of the Chiba Prefectural Assembly
Parliamentary group	Seats
Liberal Democratic Party	52
CDP/DPFP	17
Kōmeitō	8
Sensyokai (Independents)	4
Japanese Communist Party	2
Heiwa no tou (Independent)	1
Chibakenmin no koe (Independent)	1
Simin Network (Independent)	1
Liberal Minsyu (Independent)	1
Independents	5
Vacant	2
Total (including vacant seats)	94

== Organisation ==
=== President and Vice-President ===
- President: Mitsuyasu Shida (LDP), elected from Chōshi and Tōnoshō
- Vice-president: Yoshikatsu Enosawa (LDP), elected from Sodegaura

== Electoral districts ==
Electoral districts
District	Magnitude	District	Magnitude	District	Magnitude	District	Magnitude
Chōsei District	1	Chūō-ku, Chiba	3	Hanamigawa-ku	3	Inage-ku	2
Wakaba-ku	2	Midori-ku, Chiba	2	Mihama-ku	2	Chōshi, Tōnoshō	2
Ichikawa	6	Funabashi	7	Tateyama	1	Kisarazu	2
Matsudo	7	Noda	2	Mobara	2	Narita	2
Sakura, Shisui	3	Tōgane	1	Asahi	1	Narashino	2
Kashiwa	5	Katsuura, Isumi District	1	Ichihara	4	Nagareyama	2
Yashiyo	3	Abiko	2	Kamogawa, Minamibōsō, Awa District	2	Kamagaya	2
Kimitsu	2	Futtsu	1	Urayasu	2	Yotsukaidō	2
Sodegaura	1	Yachimata	1	Inzai, Sakae	2	Siroi	1
Tomisato	1	Sōsa	1	Katori, Kōzaki, Tako	2	Sanmu, Sanbu District	2
Isumi	1	Ōamishirasato	1				
