= Kōen Station =

Railway station in Sakura, Chiba Prefecture, Japan

Kōen Station 公園駅
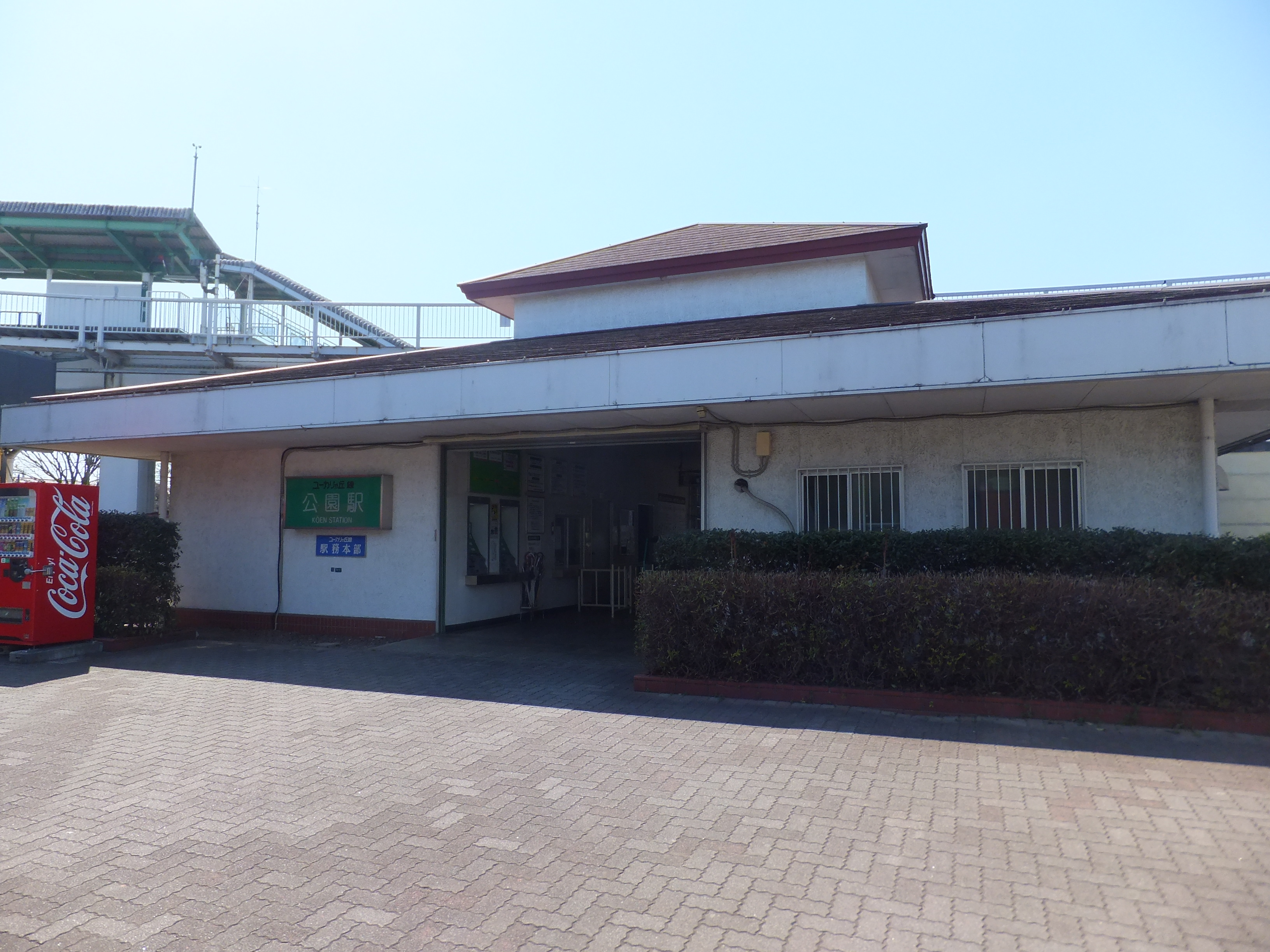
- Station entrance

General information
- Location: 5-5, Yūkarigaoka 6-chome Sakura, Chiba; Japan
- Coordinates: 35°43′51″N 140°09′14″E
- Operator: Yamaman
- Line: Yūkarigaoka Line
- Distance: 1.1 km (0.68 mi) from Yūkarigaoka, 4.1 km (2.5 mi) from Yūkarigaoka via Chūgakkō
- Platforms: 1 island platform
- Tracks: 2

Construction
- Structure type: Elevated

Other information
- Status: Staffed

History
- Opened: 2 November 1982; 43 years ago

Services
Preceding station	Yamaman	Following station
Chiku Center towards Yūkarigaoka	Yūkarigaoka Line	Joshidai towards Chūgakkō
Chiku Center towards Yūkarigaoka	Yūkarigaoka Line	Ino One-way operation
Location

Kōen Station (Japanese: 公園駅, Hepburn: Kōen-eki; lit. 'Park Station') is a people mover station in Sakura, Chiba Prefecture, Japan. It is on the Yūkarigaoka Line, serving the planned community of Yūkarigaoka. Trains run roughly every 20 minutes.

After Kōen Station, the Yūkarigaoka Line splits into two and forms a loop. Trains headed towards the loop section proceed to Joshidai Station, while trains returning from the loop proceed to Chiku Center Station.

== Gallery ==
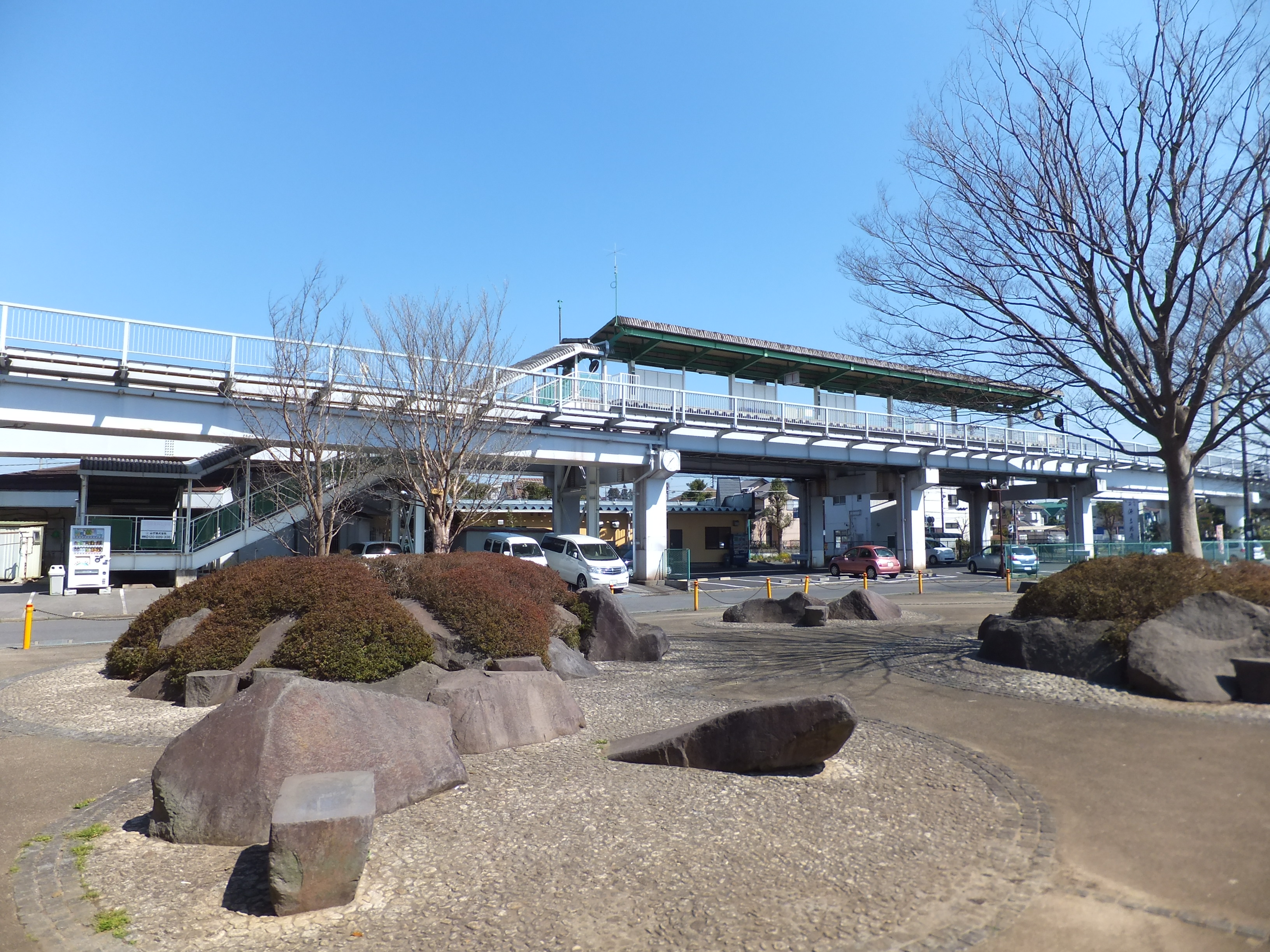
Entire view of the station

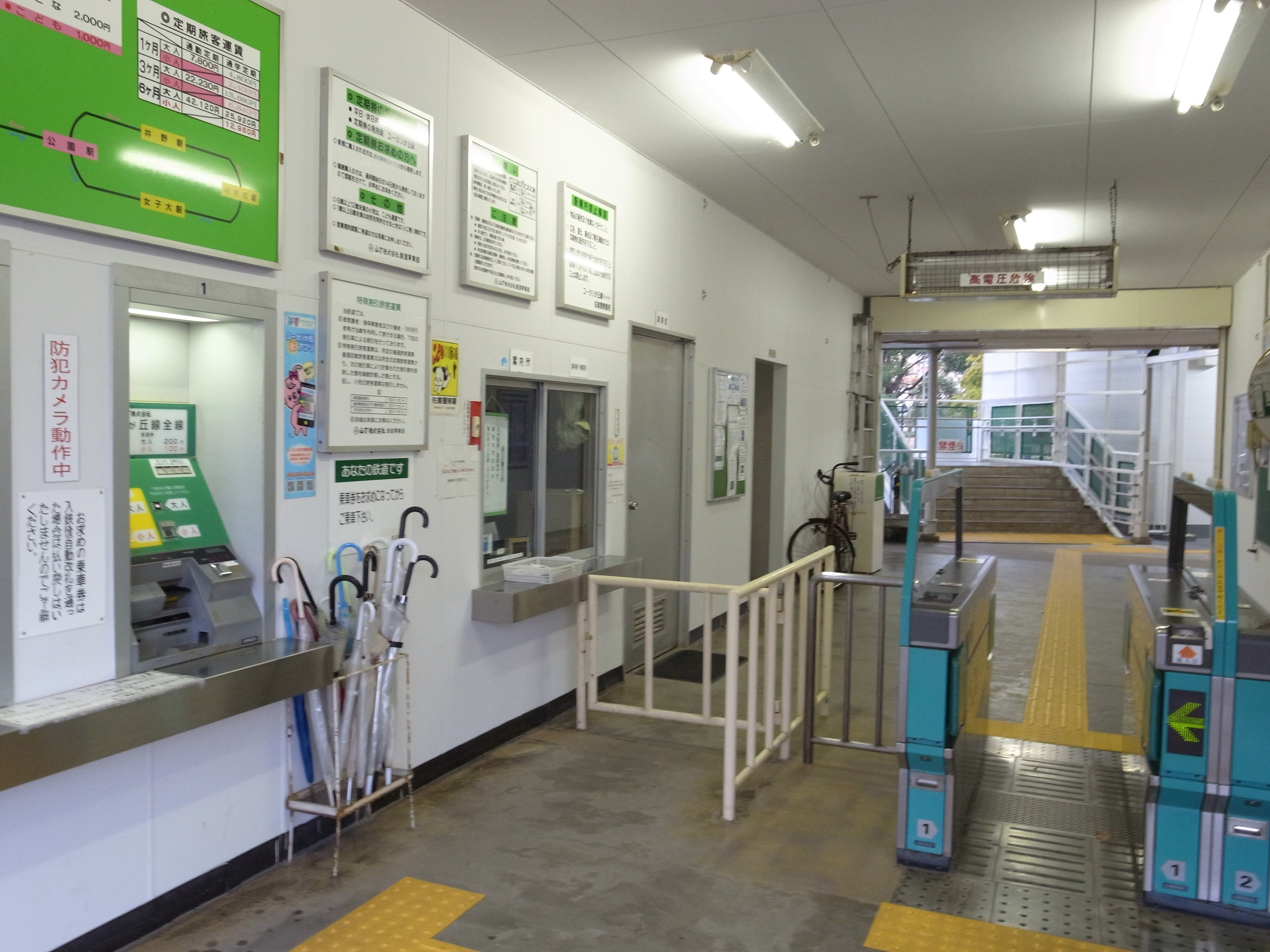
Station interior

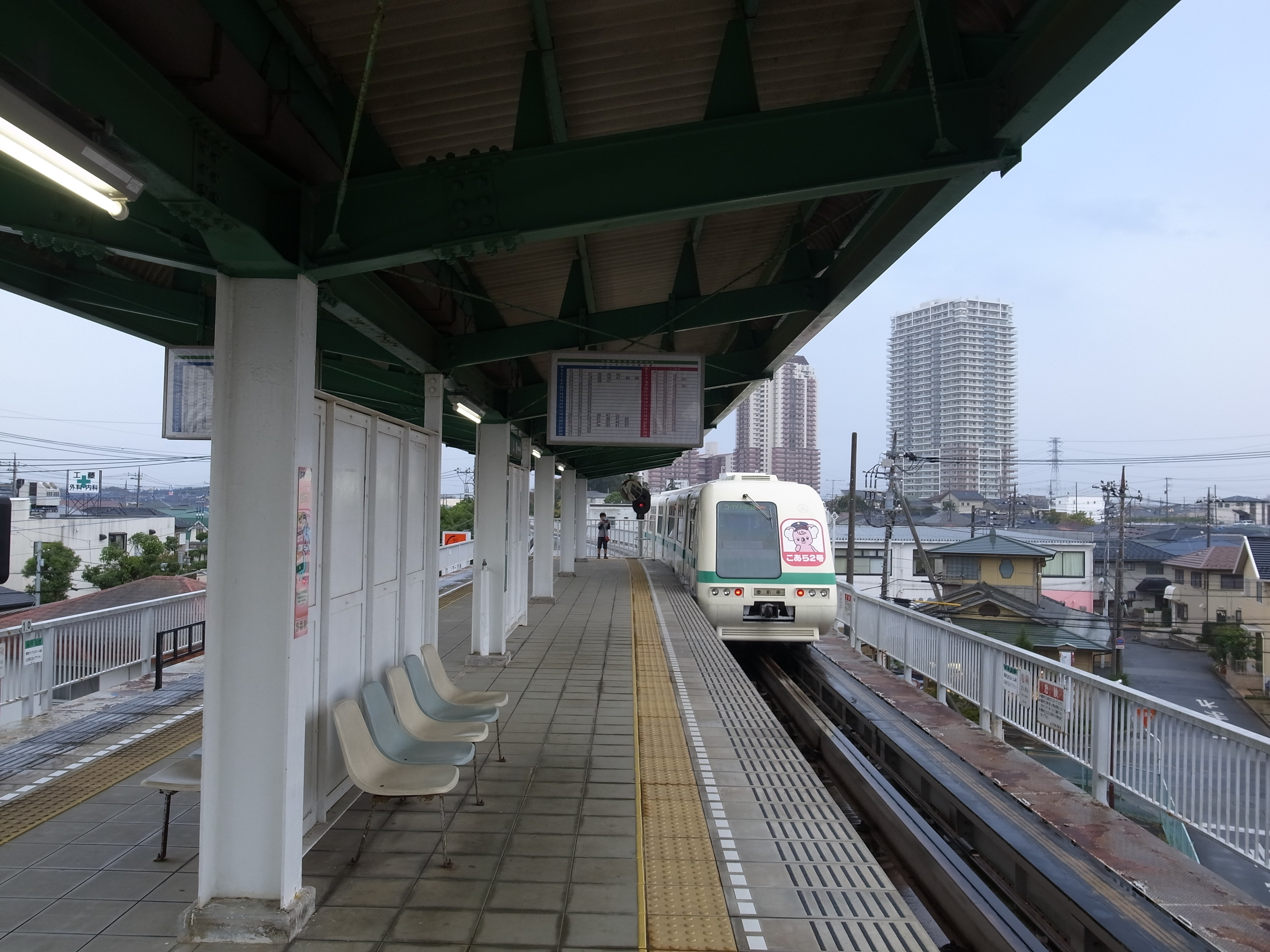
Station platform
