= Shizu =

Shizu is a Chinese term meaning ancestor or founder. It may also refer to:

== Posthumously named "Shìzǔ" (世祖) ==
- Kublai Khan (Emperor Shizu of Yuan)
- Shunzhi Emperor (Emperor Shizu of Qing)
- Wanyan Helibo (Emperor Shizu of Jin)
- Cao Pi (Emperor Shizu of [Cao] Wei)
- Emperor Xiaowu of Liu Song (Emperor Shizu of [Liu] Song)
- Emperor Wu of Southern Qi (Emperor Shizu of Southern Qi)
- Emperor Wucheng of Northern Qi (Emperor Shizu of Northern Qi)
- Emperor Wen of Chen (Emperor Shizu of Chen)
- Liu Chong (Emperor Shizu of Northern Han)
- Helian Bobo (Emperor Shizu of [Northern] Xia)
- Murong Chui (Emperor Shizu of [Later] Yan)
- Sejo of Joseon (King Shizu of Joseon [dynasty of Korea])

== Posthumously named "Shǐzǔ" (始祖) ==
- Tai Si (King Shizu of Xia)
- King Wen of Zhou (King Shizu of Zhou)
- Li Te (Emperor Shizu of Cheng Han)

== Given name ==
- Shizu Shiraki (素木 しづ; 1895 – 1918), Japanese author
- Shizu Saldamando (born 1978), American visual artist

== Fictional characters ==
- Shizu, a character from Shin Megami Tensei: Devil Summoner: Raidou Kuzunoha vs. The Soulless Army
- Shizu (シズ), a character from the video game Suikoden III
- Shizu Shidō (祇堂 静珠), a character from Maria Holic
- Princess Shizu, a character from Legend of the Eight Samurai
- Princess Shizu, a character from Shogun Iemitsu Shinobi Tabi

== Other uses ==
- Shizu (class) (士族(shìzú) or 世族(shìzú)), is a special class in Chinese history
- Shizu Station (disambiguation) (しづ, シズ), several train stations in Japan
  - Shizu Station (Chiba) (志津駅)
  - Shizu Station (Ibaraki) (静駅)

== See also ==
- Shizuka (disambiguation)
- Shizuko (静子), a feminine Japanese given name
