= Joshidai Station =

Railway station in Sakura, Chiba Prefecture, Japan

Joshidai Station 女子大駅
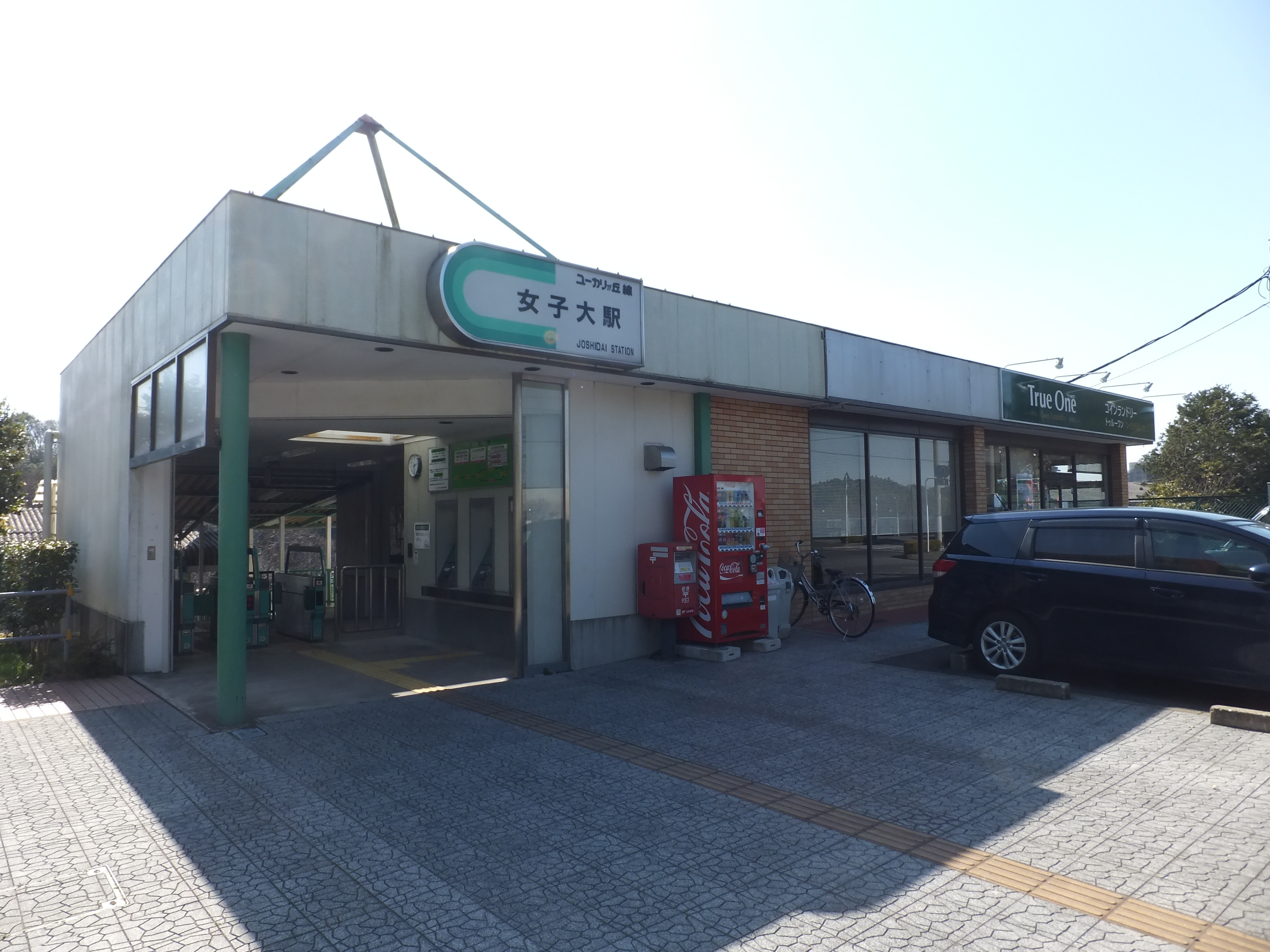
- Station entrance

General information
- Location: Sakura, Chiba; Japan
- Coordinates: 35°44′18″N 140°9′18″E
- Operator: Yamaman
- Line: Yūkarigaoka Line
- Distance: 2.0 km (1.2 mi) from Yūkarigaoka
- Platforms: 1 side platform
- Tracks: 1

Construction
- Structure type: At-grade

Other information
- Status: Unstaffed

History
- Opened: 2 November 1982; 43 years ago

Services
Preceding station	Yamaman	Following station
Kōen One-way operation	Yūkarigaoka Line	Chūgakkō towards Yūkarigaoka
Location

Joshidai Station (Japanese: 女子大駅, Hepburn: Joshidai-eki; lit. 'Women's University Station') is a people mover station in Sakura, Chiba Prefecture, Japan. It is on the Yamaman Yūkarigaoka Line, serving the planned community of Yūkarigaoka. Trains run roughly every 20 minutes.

Trains only run in one direction from this station, towards Chūgakkō Station. The station name refers to Wayo Women's University, which has a satellite campus located nearby.

== Gallery ==
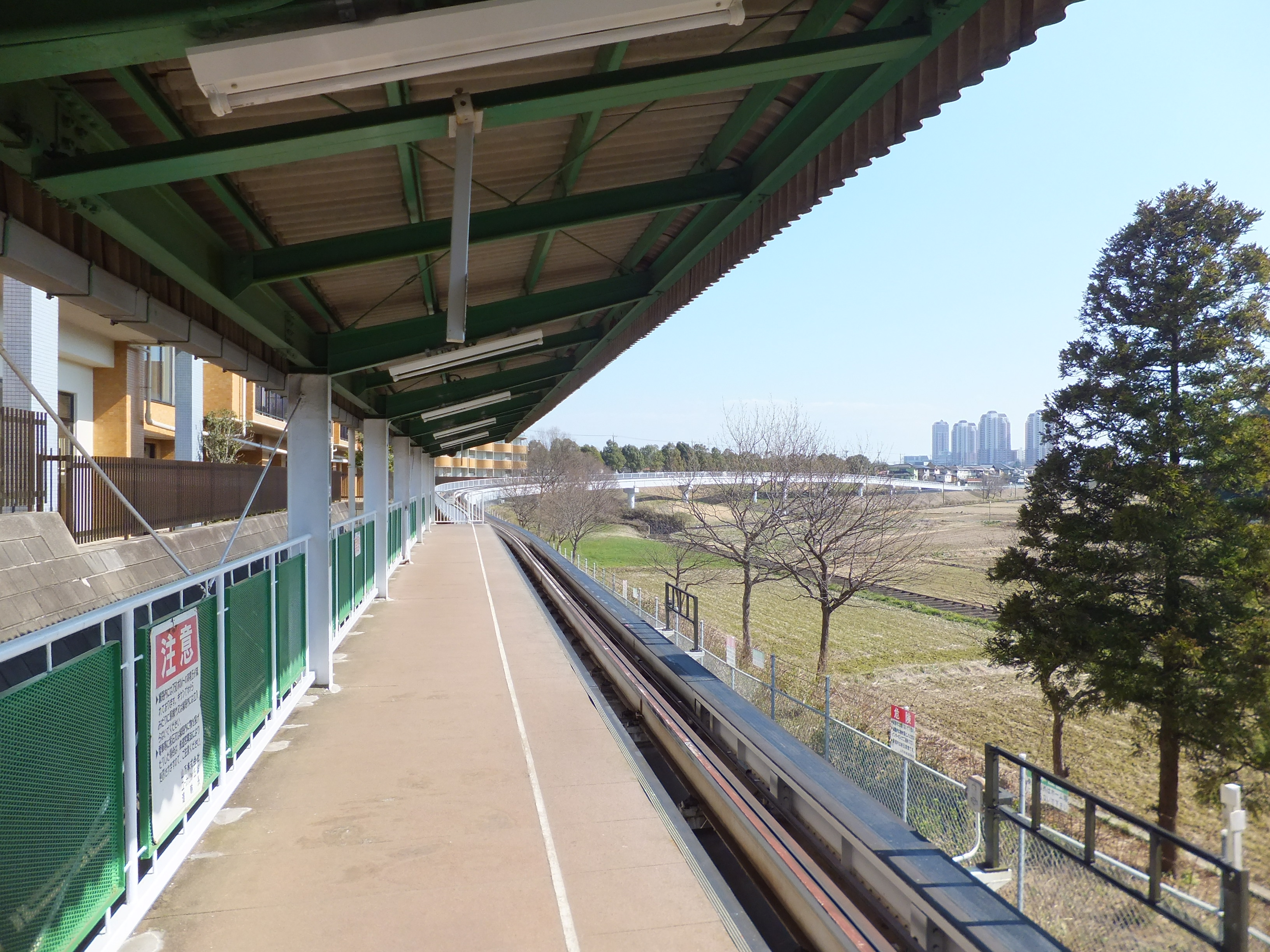
Station platform

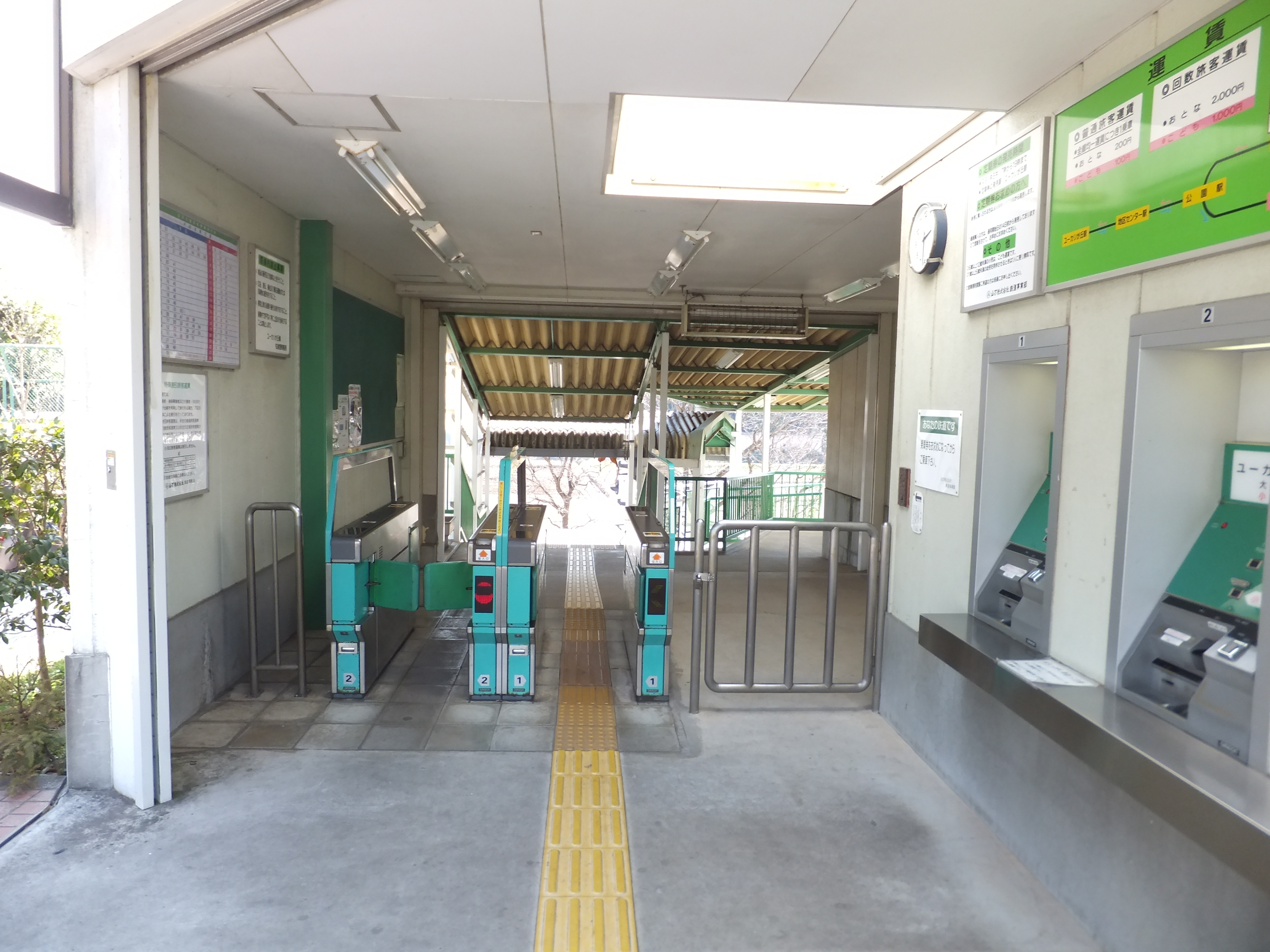
Station interior
