= Ino Station (Chiba) =

Railway station in Sakura, Chiba Prefecture, Japan

Ino Station 井野駅
- Station entrance

General information
- Location: Sakura, Chiba; Japan
- Coordinates: 35°43′57″N 140°08′55″E
- Operator: Yamaman
- Line: Yūkarigaoka Line
- Distance: 3.6 km (2.2 mi) from Yūkarigaoka
- Platforms: 1 side platform
- Tracks: 1

Construction
- Structure type: Below-grade

Other information
- Status: Unstaffed

History
- Opened: 22 September 1983; 43 years ago

Services
Preceding station	Yamaman	Following station
Chūgakkō One-way operation	Yūkarigaoka Line	Kōen towards Yūkarigaoka
Location

Ino Station (Japanese: 井野駅, Hepburn: Ino-eki) is a people mover station in Sakura, Chiba Prefecture, Japan. It is on the Yamaman Yūkarigaoka Line, serving the planned community of Yūkarigaoka. Trains run roughly every 20 minutes. Trains only run in one direction from this station, towards Kōen Station.

== Gallery ==
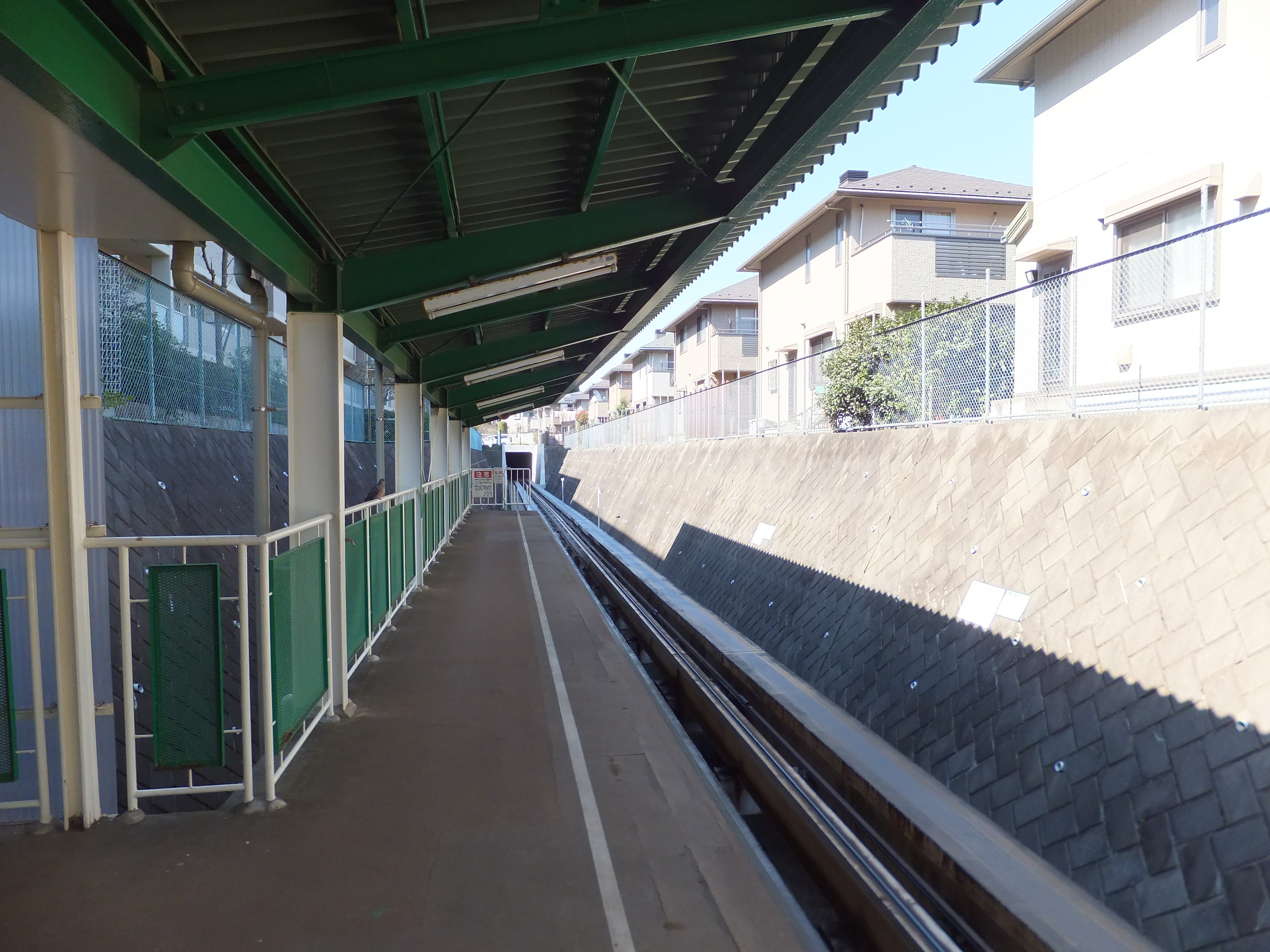
Station platform

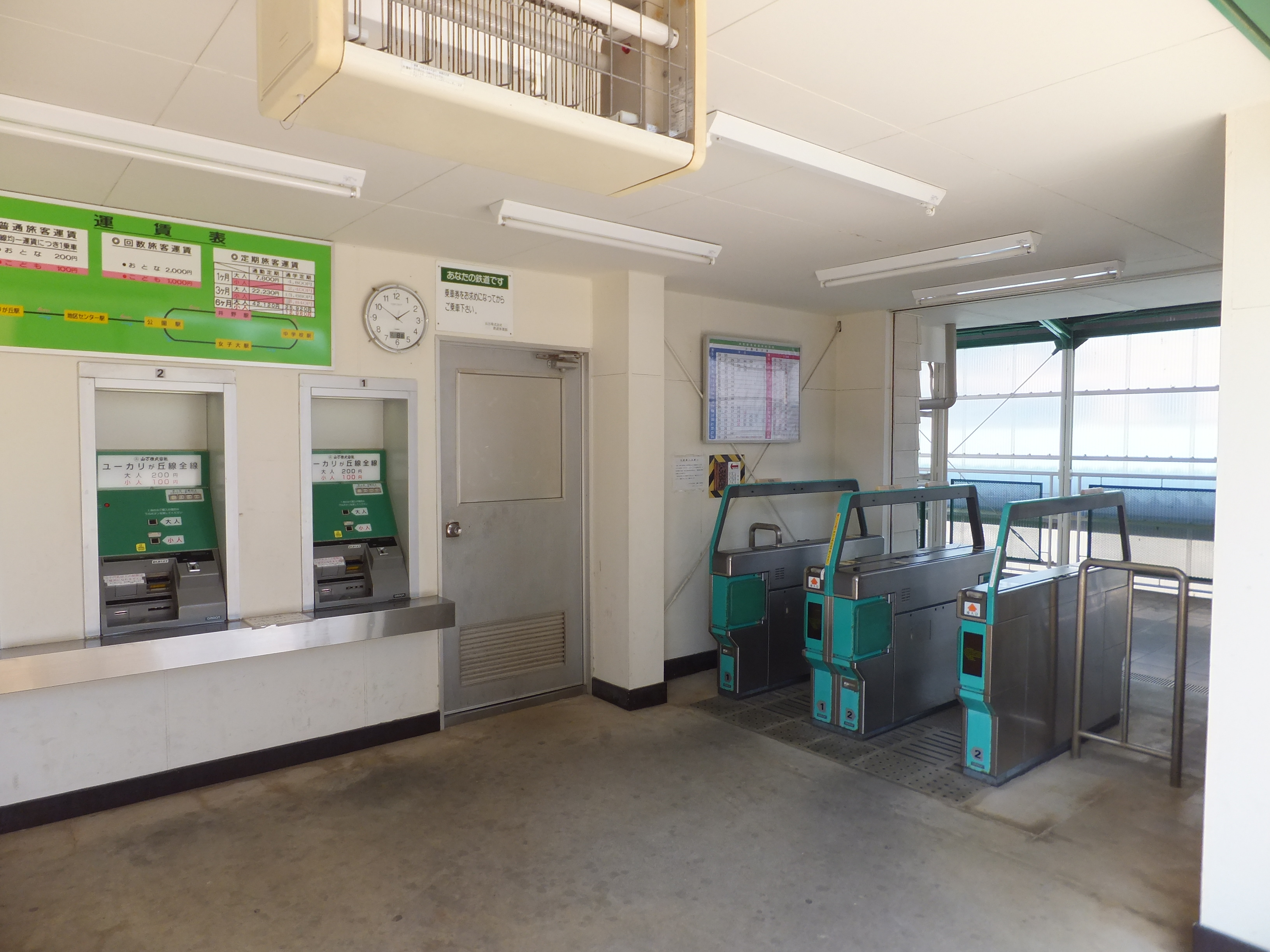
Station interior
