= Chiku Center Station =

Railway station in Sakura, Chiba Prefecture, Japan

Chiku Center Station 地区センター駅
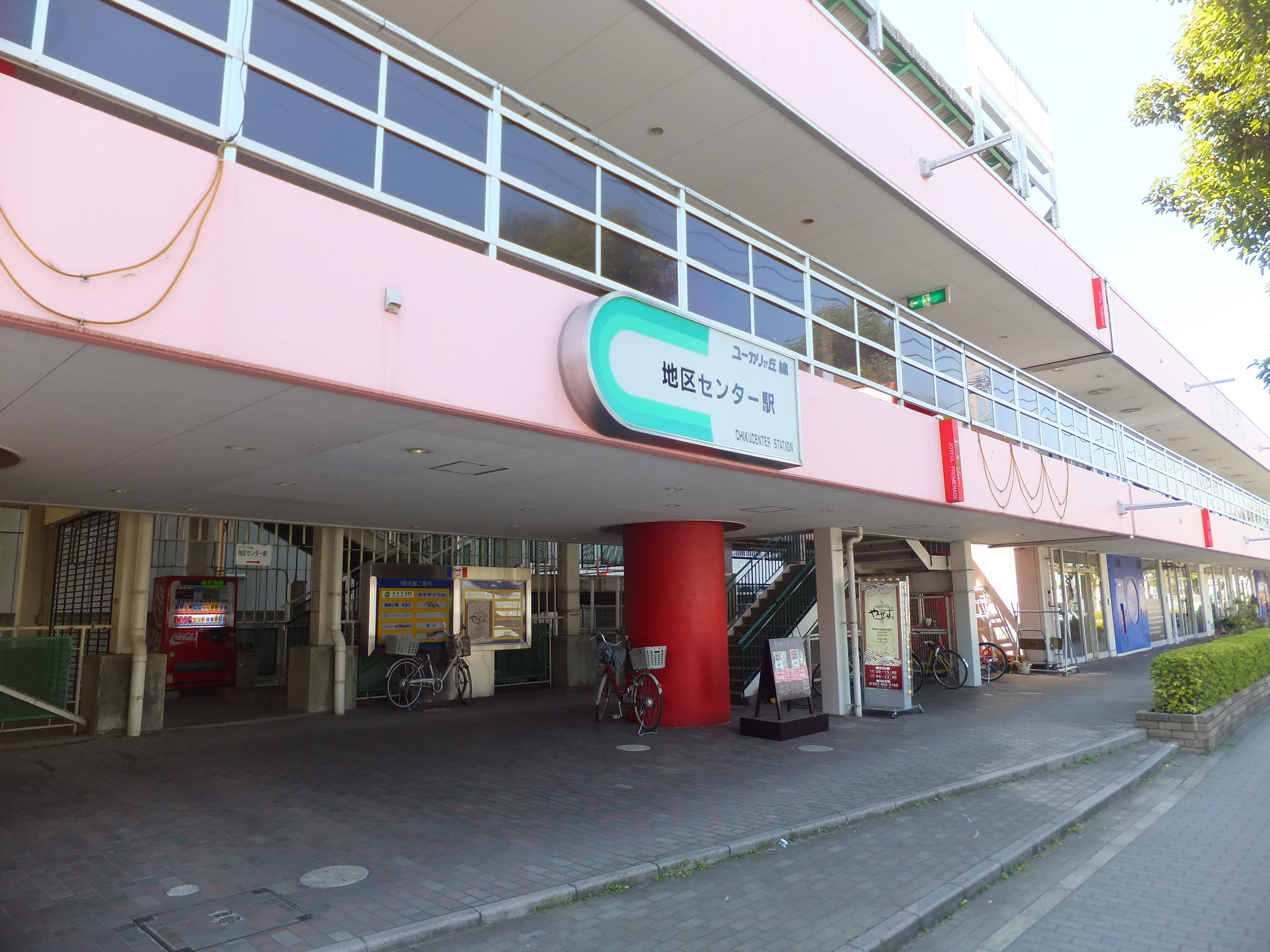
- Station entrance

General information
- Location: 3-1, Yūkarigaoka 4-chome Sakura, Chiba; Japan
- Coordinates: 35°43′33″N 140°09′19″E
- Operator: Yamaman
- Line: Yūkarigaoka Line
- Distance: 0.6 km (0.37 mi) from Yūkarigaoka
- Platforms: 1 side platform

Construction
- Structure type: Elevated

Other information
- Status: Unstaffed

History
- Opened: 3 December 1992; 33 years ago

Services
Preceding station	Yamaman	Following station
Yūkarigaoka Terminus	Yūkarigaoka Line	Kōen towards Chūgakkō
Location

Chiku Center Station (地区センター駅, Chiku-Sentā-eki) is a people mover station in Sakura, Chiba Prefecture, Japan. It is on the Yamaman Yūkarigaoka Line, serving the planned community of Yūkarigaoka. Trains run roughly every 20 minutes.

== Gallery ==
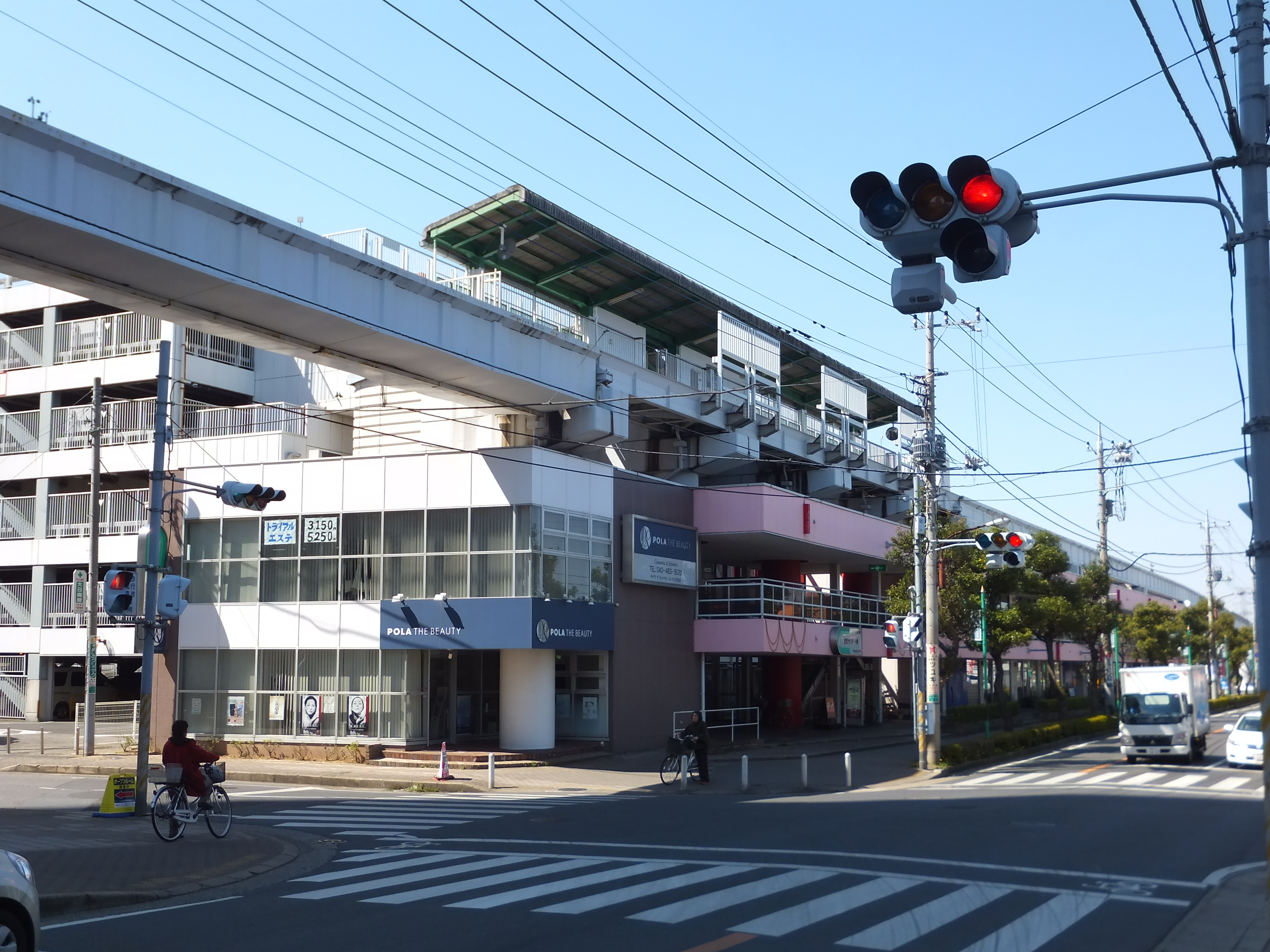
Entire view of the station

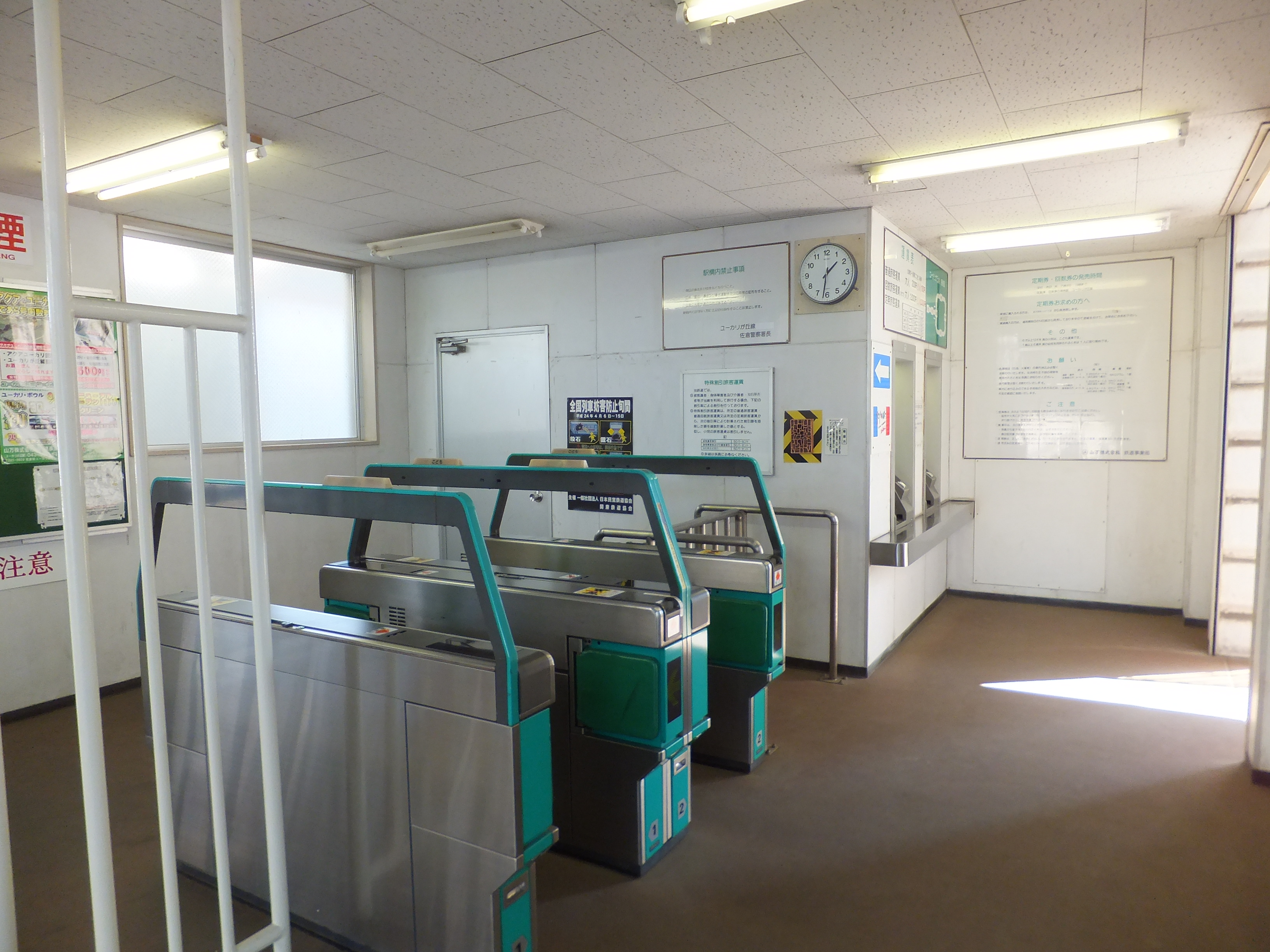
Ticket gates within the station
