= Sakura, Chiba =

Sakura 佐倉市
- City
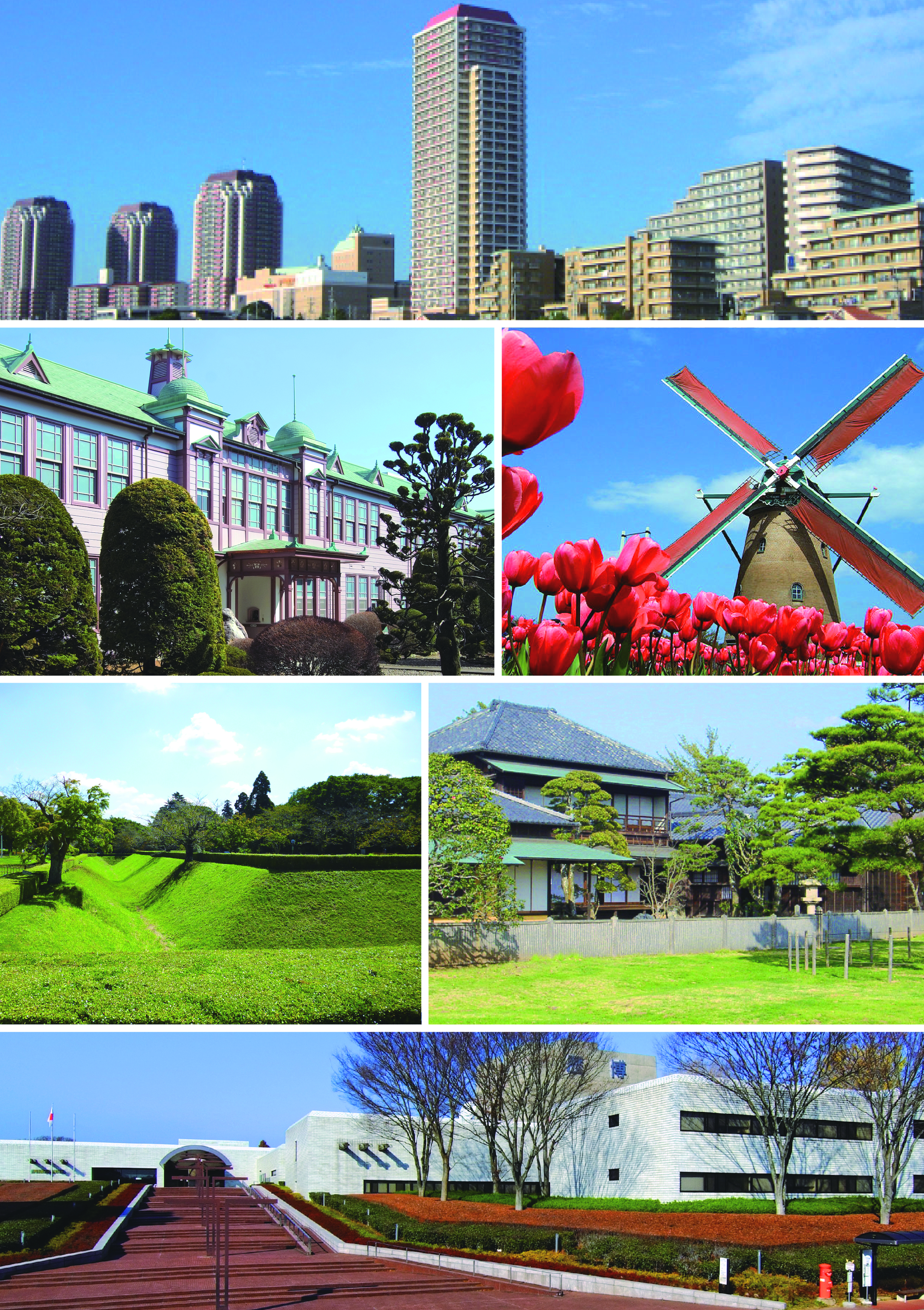
- Clockwise from top: Yukarigaoka apartment complexes; Sakura Furusato Square; Hotta residence; National Museum of Japanese History; Sakura Castle; Sakura High School

- Flag Seal

- Location of Sakura in Chiba Prefecture

- Coordinates: 35°43′N 140°13′E
- Country: Japan
- Region: Kantō
- Prefecture: Chiba

Government
  - Mayor: Sango Nishida

Area
  - Total: 103.59 km^{2} (40.00 sq mi)

Population (December 2020)
  - Total: 173,740
  - Density: 1,677.2/km^{2} (4,343.9/sq mi)
- Time zone: UTC+9 (Japan Standard Time)
- Phone number: 043-484-1111
- Address: 97, Kairinjimachi, Sakura-shi, Chiba-ken 285-8501
- Climate: Cfa
- Website: Official website
- Symbols
- Flower: Hanashōbu (Iris ensata var. ensata)
- Tree: Sakura

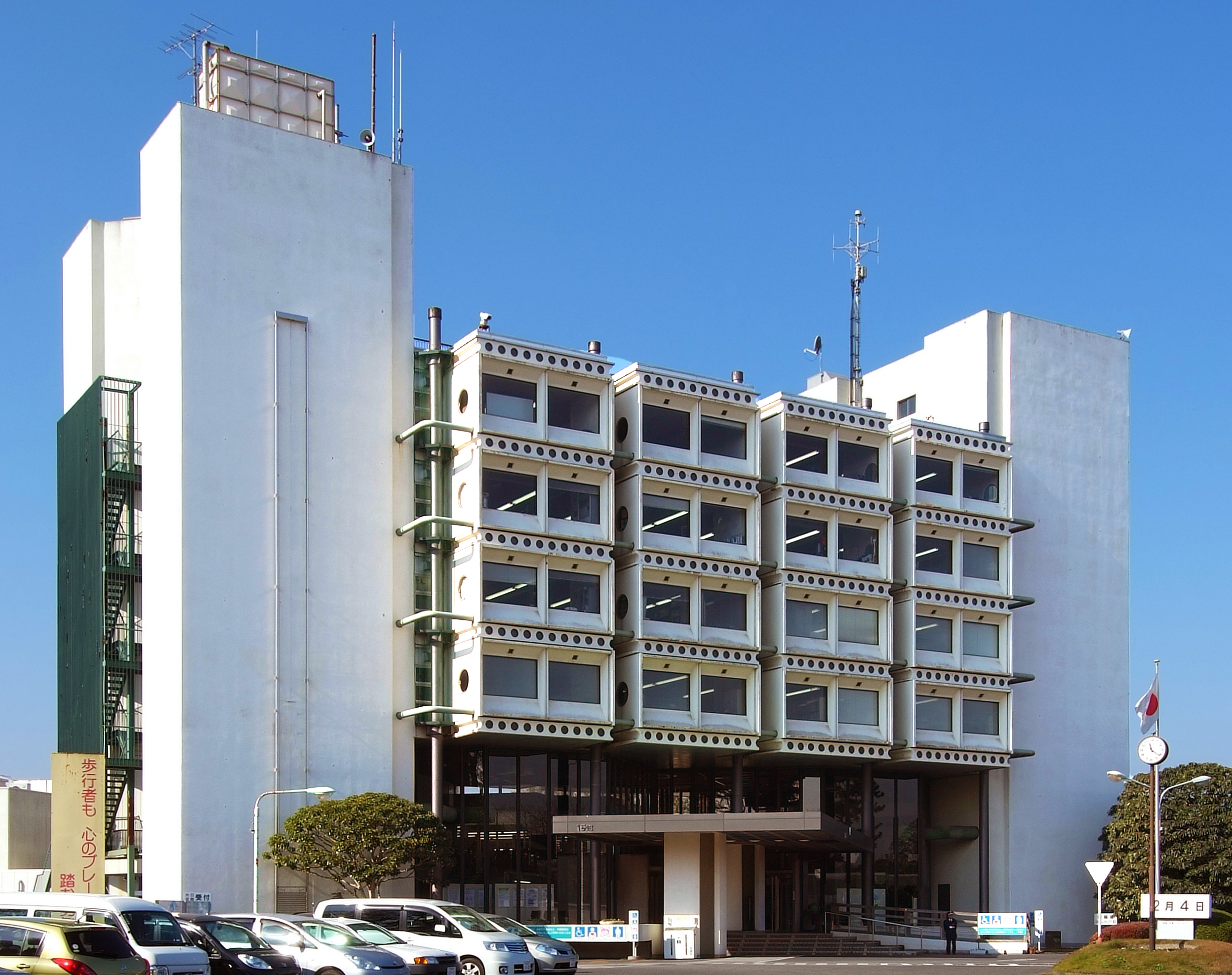
Sakura City Hall

Sakura (佐倉市, Sakura-shi; Japanese pronunciation: [saꜜ.kɯ.ɾa, sa.kɯ.ɾaꜜ.ɕi] (Note: The placename and personal name Sakura is pronounced with an accent, unlike the common noun sakura (桜; [sa.kɯ.ɾa]) from which it derives.)) is a city located in Chiba Prefecture, Japan. As of 1 November 2020, the city had an estimated population of 173,740 in 78,483 households and a population density of 1700 people per km^{2} (4300 per sq. mi.). The total area of the city is 103.59 square kilometres (40.00 sq mi).

== Geography ==
Sakura is located in northeastern Chiba Prefecture on the Shimōsa Plateau. It is situated approximately 40 kilometers (25 mi.) northeast of Tokyo and 15 kilometers (10 mi.) from Narita International Airport. Chiba City, the prefectural capital, lies 15 kilometers (10 mi.) southwest of Sakura. Lake Inba forms the northern city limits.

=== Neighboring municipalities ===
Chiba Prefecture

- Hanamigawa-ku
- Inzai
- Shisui
- Wakaba-ku
- Yachimata
- Yachiyo
- Yotsukaidō

=== Climate ===
Sakura has a humid subtropical climate (Köppen Cfa) characterized by warm summers and cool winters with light to no snowfall. The average annual temperature in Sakura is 14.8 °C (58.6 °F). The average annual rainfall is 1,455.9 mm (57.32 in) with October as the wettest month. The temperatures are highest on average in August, at around 26.3 °C (79.3 °F), and lowest in January, at around 3.7 °C (38.7 °F).

Climate data for Sakura, Chiba (1991−2020 normals, extremes 1978−present)
Month	Jan	Feb	Mar	Apr	May	Jun	Jul	Aug	Sep	Oct	Nov	Dec	Year
Record high °C (°F)	19.0 (66.2)	24.3 (75.7)	25.6 (78.1)	29.3 (84.7)	33.9 (93.0)	34.9 (94.8)	37.9 (100.2)	39.1 (102.4)	36.6 (97.9)	32.2 (90.0)	25.7 (78.3)	23.8 (74.8)	39.1 (102.4)
Mean daily maximum °C (°F)	9.6 (49.3)	10.4 (50.7)	13.7 (56.7)	18.8 (65.8)	23.2 (73.8)	25.8 (78.4)	29.8 (85.6)	31.2 (88.2)	27.3 (81.1)	21.9 (71.4)	16.8 (62.2)	11.9 (53.4)	20.0 (68.1)
Daily mean °C (°F)	3.7 (38.7)	4.8 (40.6)	8.3 (46.9)	13.4 (56.1)	18.1 (64.6)	21.3 (70.3)	25.1 (77.2)	26.3 (79.3)	22.7 (72.9)	17.1 (62.8)	11.2 (52.2)	6.0 (42.8)	14.8 (58.7)
Mean daily minimum °C (°F)	−1.8 (28.8)	−0.7 (30.7)	2.8 (37.0)	7.9 (46.2)	13.5 (56.3)	17.6 (63.7)	21.5 (70.7)	22.6 (72.7)	19.0 (66.2)	12.9 (55.2)	6.2 (43.2)	0.5 (32.9)	10.2 (50.3)
Record low °C (°F)	−12.7 (9.1)	−9.5 (14.9)	−5.3 (22.5)	−2.3 (27.9)	3.6 (38.5)	9.8 (49.6)	13.5 (56.3)	15.4 (59.7)	7.2 (45.0)	−0.4 (31.3)	−3.9 (25.0)	−7.2 (19.0)	−12.7 (9.1)
Average precipitation mm (inches)	65.9 (2.59)	57.8 (2.28)	109.2 (4.30)	112.9 (4.44)	127.4 (5.02)	148.6 (5.85)	140.1 (5.52)	109.1 (4.30)	206.5 (8.13)	223.3 (8.79)	95.8 (3.77)	56.0 (2.20)	1,455.9 (57.32)
Average precipitation days (≥ 1.0 mm)	5.8	6.4	10.4	10.4	10.7	11.7	10.3	8.0	11.0	10.9	8.3	6.1	110
Mean monthly sunshine hours	189.5	169.7	170.2	180.1	179.4	128.2	162.0	191.4	135.1	132.1	146.8	171.5	1,956
Source: Japan Meteorological Agency

== Demographics ==
Per Japanese census data, the population of Sakura increased rapidly in the late 20th century and has plateaued in the 21st.

Historical population
Year	Pop.	±%
1960	36,869	—
1970	60,068	+62.9%
1980	101,180	+68.4%
1990	144,688	+43.0%
2000	170,934	+18.1%
2010	172,183	+0.7%
2020	168,743	−2.0%

== History ==
The area around Sakura has been inhabited since prehistory, and archaeologists have found numerous Kofun period burial tumuli in the area, along with the remains of a Hakuho period Buddhist temple. During the Kamakura and Muromachi periods, the area was controlled by the Chiba clan. During the Sengoku period, the Chiba clan fought the Satomi clan to the south, and the Later Hōjō clan to the west. After the defeat of the Chiba clan, the area came within the control of Tokugawa Ieyasu, who assigned one of his chief generals, Doi Toshikatsu to rebuild Chiba Castle and to rule over Sakura Domain as a daimyō. Doi rebuilt the area as a jōkamachi, or castle town, which became the largest castle town in the Bōsō region. Under the Tokugawa shogunate, Sakura Domain came to be ruled for most of the Edo period under the Hotta clan. In the Bakumatsu period the domain became a center for rangaku studies, centered on the Juntendō school of the doctor Taizen Satō (1804 – 1872). The Juntendō and other educational institutions in Sakura contributed greatly to the Meiji Restoration. After the abolition of Sakura Domain, the area eventually became part of Chiba Prefecture.

Sakura Town was one of several towns and villages created on April 1, 1889, under Inba District with the establishment of the modern municipalities system. On March 31, 1954, Sakura achieved city status through merger of the neighboring municipalities of Usui, Wada, Nego, Yadomi, and Shizu.

== Government ==
Sakura has a mayor-council form of government with a directly elected mayor and a unicameral city council of 28 members. Sakura contributes three members to the Chiba Prefectural Assembly. In terms of national politics, the city is part of Chiba 9th district of the lower house of the Diet of Japan.

== Economy ==
Sakura is a regional commercial center and, due to its numerous train connections, a bedroom community for nearby Chiba and Tokyo, with more than 24% of the population commuting, per the 2010 census.

== Education ==
- Keiai University branch campus
- Chiba Keiai Junior College
- Wayo Women's University branch campus
- Sakura has 23 public elementary schools and 11 public middle schools operated by the city government, and four public high schools operated by the Chiba Prefectural Board of Education.

== Transportation ==
=== Railway ===
JR East – Narita Line, Sōbu Main Line

- Sakura

Keisei Electric Railway - Keisei Main Line

- Shizu - Yūkarigaoka - Keisei-Usui - Keisei-Sakura - Ōsakura

■ Yamaman - Yamaman Yūkarigaoka Line

- Yūkarigaoka - Chiku Center - Kōen - Joshidai- Chūgakkō - Ino

=== Highway ===
- Higashi-Kantō Expressway
- National Route 51
- National Route 296

== Local attractions ==
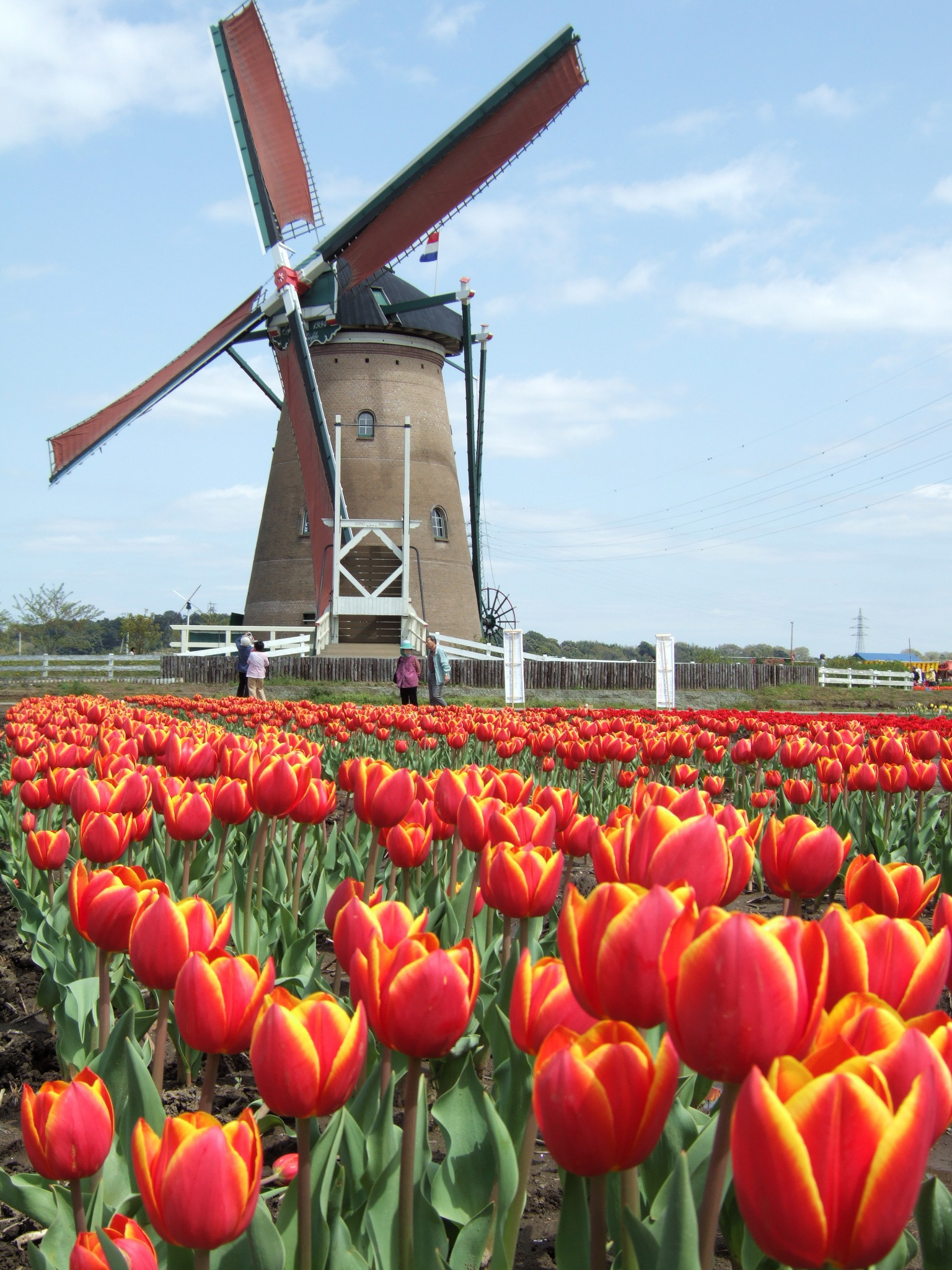
De Liefde Windmill, constructed in 1994

Sakura boasts a number of tourist attractions, including the large National Museum of Japanese History located on the ruins of Sakura Castle. Several samurai houses near the old castle are open to the public and are protected as Important Cultural Properties. Other sights of interest include the Moto Sakura Castle (one of the Continued Top 100 Japanese Castles), Tsukamoto Sword Museum, Sakura Museum of History and Folklore, Sakura City Museum of Art, and the Sakura Juntendo Memorial Building. Nearby is also the Kawamura Memorial Museum of Art.

In 1994 on the 40th anniversary of the city's foundation a Dutch windmill called De Liefde was erected by the Dutch millwright company "Verbij Hoogmade BV" on the south-eastern shore of Lake Inba as a landmark of Sakura Furusato Square. The mill serving as a polder mill is named after the first Dutch sailing ship which landed on the Japanese shore in 1600. It is the only windmill of this type in Japan (a so-called "ground-sailer", which means a windmill whose sails reach almost down to the ground.

In 2023, a monument dedicated to the dog Kabosu was installed in Sakura.

== Noted people from Sakura ==
- Ben-K, professional wrestler (real name: Futa Nakamura (中村風太, Nakamura Futa)
- Bump of Chicken, alternative rock group
- Asai Chū, painter, noted for his pioneering work in developing the yōga (Western-style) art movement in late nineteenth century and early twentieth-century Japanese painting
- Daisuke Fukushima, Olympic show jumping rider
- Kabosu, Shiba Inu dog known as the origin of the Doge meme
- Katsuya Nagato, footballer who plays as a defender for Yokohama F. Marinos in the J1 League
- Shinnosuke Nakatani, footballer who plays as a defender for Gamba Osaka in J1 League
- Sakiko Odaka, women's professional shogi player ranked 1-kyū
- Yoshimi Osawa, judoka and one of only three living Kodokan 10th dan
- Tsuda Sen, Meiji period statesman
- Shinnosuke Shigenobu, professional baseball outfielder for the Yomiuri Giants in Japan's Nippon Professional Baseball
- Nagashima Shigeo, professional baseball player
- Hayashi Tadasu, Meiji period statesman
