= Chiba Keiai Junior College =

Private junior Colleges in Sakura, Chiba, Japan

Coordinates: 35°41′06″N 140°12′29″E

- 千葉敬愛短期大学
- Type: private
- Established: 1950
- Location: Sakura, Chiba, Japan
- Website: www.chibakeiai.ac.jp

Chiba Keiai Junior College (千葉敬愛短期大学, Chiba Keiai Tanki Daigakubu) is one of the private junior Colleges located at Sakura, Chiba in Japan. It is one of the 149 junior colleges in Japan set up in 1950 when the junior college system started. It consists of one department now.

== Department and Graduate Course ==
=== Departments ===
- Department of Child care

== See also ==
- List of junior colleges in Japan
- Keiai University
