= Shizuka (disambiguation) =

Shizuka is a Japanese given name.

Shizuka may also refer to:

- Shizuka (band), a Japanese rock band
- Shizuka (album), by Shizuka Kudo, 1988
- Shizuka (apple), a variety of Japanese apple

== See also ==
- "Shizuka na Hibi no Kaidan o", an LP recording by Dragon Ash, 2000
