= Shizu Station =

Shizu Station is the name of two train stations in Japan:

- Shizu Station (Chiba) (志津駅)
- Shizu Station (Ibaraki) (静駅)
