= Yūkarigaoka Line =

Transit system in Chiba, Japan

- Yūkarigaoka Line train passes high-rise condominiums in the Yukarigaoka community, August 2023

Overview
- Native name: 山万ユーカリが丘線
- Locale: Yūkarigaoka, Sakura, Chiba, Japan
- Stations: 6

Service
- Type: Rubber-tired people mover

History
- Opened: 2 November 1982
- Completed: 22 September 1983

Technical
- Line length: 4.1 km (2.5 mi)
- Number of tracks: 1
- Electrification: Conductor rail, 750 V DC
- Operating speed: 50 km/h (31 mph)

The Yūkarigaoka Line (Japanese: ユーカリが丘線, Hepburn: Yūkarigaoka-sen; lit. 'Eucalyptus Hill Line') is a manually operated rubber-tired people mover owned and operated by Yamaman Co., Ltd., the developer of the planned community of Yūkarigaoka, Japan. The line, which opened in two stages between November 2, 1982, and September 22, 1983, runs from Yūkarigaoka Station. The entire route lies within the city of Sakura in Chiba Prefecture. The line follows a racquet-shaped route as shown in the route diagram.

To reduce costs, the line was built to be manually operated.

== Service description ==
=== Frequency ===
Yūkarigaoka Line trains run every 20 minutes for most of the day, every day. On weekdays, service increases to about every 15 minutes during the morning and evening rush hours. Service begins shortly after 5 a.m. and continues until around midnight.

=== Stations ===
All stations are in Sakura, Chiba. Trains run in a counter-clockwise direction, following the listed order.

Name	Distance	Connections
Yūkarigaoka	0.0 km (0 mi)	Keisei Main Line
Chiku Center	0.6 km (0.37 mi)	
Kōen	1.1 km (0.68 mi)	
Joshidai	2.0 km (1.2 mi)	
Chūgakkō	2.8 km (1.7 mi)	
Ino	3.6 km (2.2 mi)	
Kōen	4.1 km (2.5 mi)	
Chiku Center	4.6 km (2.9 mi)	
Yūkarigaoka	5.2 km (3.2 mi)	Keisei Main Line

== History ==
Inside one of the trains in motion, 2014

The Yūkarigaoka Line was developed by Yamaman Co., Ltd., a real estate company which was also the developer of the planned community of Yūkarigaoka, in Sakura, Chiba, Japan. Yamaman wanted to place all residents of Yūkarigaoka within a 10-minute walk of a station. Yamaman's decision to enter the railway business and continue operating the line itself was unusual at the time, as railway operations were outside the company's traditional business. The Ministry of Transport initially expressed reservations about a real estate company operating a railway, and Yamaman underwent extensive negotiations before receiving approval to proceed.

The Yūkarigaoka Line became the first people mover system in Japan operated by a wholly private company, excluding third-sector railways. The line uses the centrally guided VONA system, developed by Nippon Sharyo and other companies. Before its adoption on the Yūkarigaoka Line, the system had been used as an attraction at Yatsu Amusement Park in Narashino, Chiba.

The first section of the line between Yūkarigaoka and Chūgakkō via Joshidai opened on 2 November 1982. The remaining section between Chūgakkō and Kōen Station via Ino opened on 22 September 1983, completing the line and beginning its present circular operation. The line was expanded on 3 December 1992 with the opening of an infill station at Chiku Center.

The line has adopted the Koala as its mascot, a reference to the name of the Yūkarigaoka community, which literally means 'Eucalyptus Hill'. Koalas primarily feed on eucalyptus leaves. However, neither koalas nor eucalyptus are native to Japan.

The line was suspended following the 2011 Tōhoku earthquake and tsunami on 11 March 2011. Service resumed across the entire line on 1 April, although daytime service was initially suspended through 7 April and replaced by buses.

In September 2021, Yamaman began testing a facial-recognition ticketing system on the Yūkarigaoka Line and its bus services. The trial, conducted jointly with Panasonic and Jorudan, continued through January 2022.

On 14 June 2024, Yamaman ended sales of magnetic tickets and commuter passes on the line, except for school commuter passes, coupon tickets, and free passes. The following day, it introduced the facial-recognition ticketing system, branded "Yūkari PASS", together with QR-code tickets.

== Bus services ==
In November 2020, Yamaman established a bus department to provide local transportation around Yūkarigaoka. The service was developed in response to difficulties some residents, particularly older people, faced when using the Yūkarigaoka Line.

Before establishing its bus department, Yamaman operated the Kokora-ra-gō (ここらら号) as a community transportation trial from 2013 until October 2020. The current Yamaman community bus, Koala go (ここらら号, Koara-gō), operates the Yūkarigaoka Circulation Line and Katsutadai Circulation Line. The Yūkarigaoka Circulation Line has clockwise and counter-clockwise services from Yūkarigaoka Station, while the Katsutadai Circulation Line provides separate weekday and weekend/holiday services.

== See also ==
- List of rapid transit systems
