= Shizuka =

- Pronunciation: IPA: [ɕiꜜzɯka]
- Gender: Unisex

Origin
- Origin: Japanese
- Meaning: Depends on kanji used.
- Region of origin: Japanese

Other names
- Related names: Shizu; Shizuko

Shizuka (しずか, シズカ) is a unisex Japanese given name.

== People with the name ==
- Shizuka Anderson, (born 1991) Canadian-Japanese actress, television presenter, and model
- Shizuka Aoki (青木 静香; born 1972), Japanese voice actress
- Shizuka Arakawa (静香; born 1981), Japanese figure skater
- Shizuka Gozen (静; 1165–1211), Japanese court dancer
- Shizuka Anderson (born 1988), Japanese Paralympic judoka
- Shizuka Hasegawa (静香; born 1988), Japanese voice actress
- Shizuka Ijūin (静), Japanese novelist and lyricist
- Shizuka Ishibashi (静河; born 1994), Japanese actress and dancer
- Shizuka Ishigami (石上 静香; born 1988), Japanese voice actress
- Shizuka Ishikawa (静; born 1971), Japanese voice actress
- Shizuka Itō (静; born 1980), Japanese voice actress
- Shizuka Kamei (静香; born 1936), Japanese politician
- Shizuka Kubota (静; born 1983), Japanese former cricketer
- Shizuka Kudō (静香; born 1970), Japanese singer
- Shizuka Matsuo (静香; born 1986), Japanese badminton player
- Shizuka Miura (静香; died 2010), Japanese ball-jointed doll maker and musician
- Shizuka Miyaji (静香; born 1981), Japanese cricketer
- Shizuka Miyano (静), Japanese idol and member of Candy Tune
- Shizuka Murayama (密; 1918-2013), Japanese-French yōga painter
- Shizuka Nakamura (中村 静香; born 1988), Japanese gravure idol and actress
- Shizuka Narahara (楢原 静; born 1928), Japanese table tennis player
- Shizuka Nishida (静香; born 1988), Japanese pop singer, actress, and performer
- Shizuka Okazaki (静夏; born 1992), Japanese motorcycle racer
- Shizuka Ōya (志津香; born 1991), Japanese idol and talent
- Shizuka Saitō (齋藤 支靜加; born 1980), Japanese actress, gravure idol, and writer
- Shizuka Sugiyama (しずか; born 1987), Japanese mixed martial arts fighter
- Shizuka Terata (静; born 1975), Japanese politician
- Shizuka Uchida (しづか; born 1989), Japanese former badminton player
- Shizuka Yamamoto (静香; born 1975), badminton player
- Shizuka Yokomizo (横溝 静; born 1966), Japanese photographer

== Fictional characters ==
- Lady Shizuka, a character in the book Autumn Bridge by Takashi Matsuoka
- Shizuka Dōmeki (静), a male character in the manga and anime series xxxHolic
- Shizuka Hattori (静華), a character in the manga and anime series Detective Conan
- Shizuka Hio (閑), a character in the manga and anime series Vampire Knight
- Shizuka Joestar (静), a character in the manga series JoJo's Bizarre Adventure, by Hirohiko Araki
- Shizuka Kawai (川井静香), a character in the manga and anime series Yu-Gi-Oh!
- Shizuka Kiryu (桐生 静), a character and a Miko from Yuki Yuna is a Hero: Bouquet of Brilliance
- Shizuka Kuze (久世 しずか), a character in the web manga series Takopi's Original Sin
- Shizuka Marikawa (静香), a character in the series Highschool of the Dead
- Shizuka Mikazuki (三日月 閑), a character in the manga series Zom 100: Bucket List of the Dead
- Shizuka Minamoto (源静香), a character in the manga and anime series Doraemon
- Shizuka Muto, a character in the book trilogy Tales of the Otori
- Shizuka Nanahoshi (七星静香), a character in the light novel and anime series Mushoku Tensei
- Shizuka, Kaze no (シズカ), a character in the Super Sentai series GoGo Sentai Boukenger
- Shizuka Sakai (酒井静香), a character in the Yo-kai Watch franchise
- Shizuka Shishi (獅子静香), a character in the shōnen manga series Boarding School Juliet
- Shizuka Todou (藤堂静), a character in the shōjo manga series Boys Over Flowers
- Shizuka Yoshimoto (好本 静), a character in the manga and anime series The 100 Girlfriends Who Really, Really, Really, Really, Really Love You
