= Shizuko =

- Gender: Female

Origin
- Origin: Japanese
- Meaning: Quiet child
- Region of origin: Japanese

Other names
- Related names: Shizuka

Shizuko (しずこ, シズコ, 静子) is a feminine Japanese given name.

== Possible spellings ==
Shizuko can be written in hiragana, katakana, kanji, or with a combination of kana and kanji.

- しず子, spelled with hiragana and kanji
- シズ子, spelled with katakana and kanji
- 静子, "quiet/calm, child"
- 志津子, "motives, sea port, child"

== People with the name ==
- Shizuko Gō (郷 静子), Japanese novelist
- Shizuko Ihara (静子), Japanese enka singer professionally known as Mina Aoe
- Susana Shizuko Higuchi Miyagawa (シズコ), Japanese Peruvian politician and engineer. Ex-wife of former Peruvian president Alberto Fujimori.
- Shizuko Hoshi (シズコ), Japanese American actress and theatre director. Widow of Japanese actor Makoto "Mako" Iwamatsu.
- Shizuko Kasagi (シヅ子, 静子), Japanese jazz singer and actress
- Shizuko Minase (静子), daughter of Viscount Tadasuki Minase of Japan and wife of Prince Kuni Taka of Japan. Mother of Princess Hatsuko, Prince Yoshihiko, Princess Kuniko, Prince Iehiko, and Prince Norihiko of Japan
- Shizuko Natsuki (静子), Japanese author
- Shizuko Nogi (静子), daughter of samurai Yuji Sadano and wife of Count Maresuke Nogi
- Shizuko Sakashita (坂下 千津子), Japanese gymnast
- Shizuko Tōdō (藤堂 志津子), Japanese novelist and essayist
- Wakamatsu Shizuko (若松 賤子), Japanese educator, translator, and novelist

== Fictional characters ==
- Shizuko Amaike (志津子), female character in Fortune Arterial
- Shizuko Azumi (静子), female character in Cat Girl Alliance
- Shizuko Kaga (しず子, female character in Maid Sama!
- Shizuko Myojin, adoptive mother of Takeru Myojin in anime Godmars
- Shizuko Yamamura, mother of Sadako Yamamura in Koji Suzuki's 1991 novel Ring
- Shizuko (Cha Ju-Ran) (静子), female character in The Silenced, South Korean mystery-thriller movie
- Shizuko Yamashiro, the wife of the late special agent Ido Yamashiro and mother of Tatsu/Katana from Beware the Batman
- Shizuko Kawawa (河和 シズコ), a playable character from the role-playing game Blue Archive
- Shizuko, the alias of Shizuku Osaka from Love Live! Nijigasaki High School Idol Club
