= Chūgakkō Station =

Railway station in Sakura, Chiba Prefecture, Japan

Chūgakkō Station 中学校駅
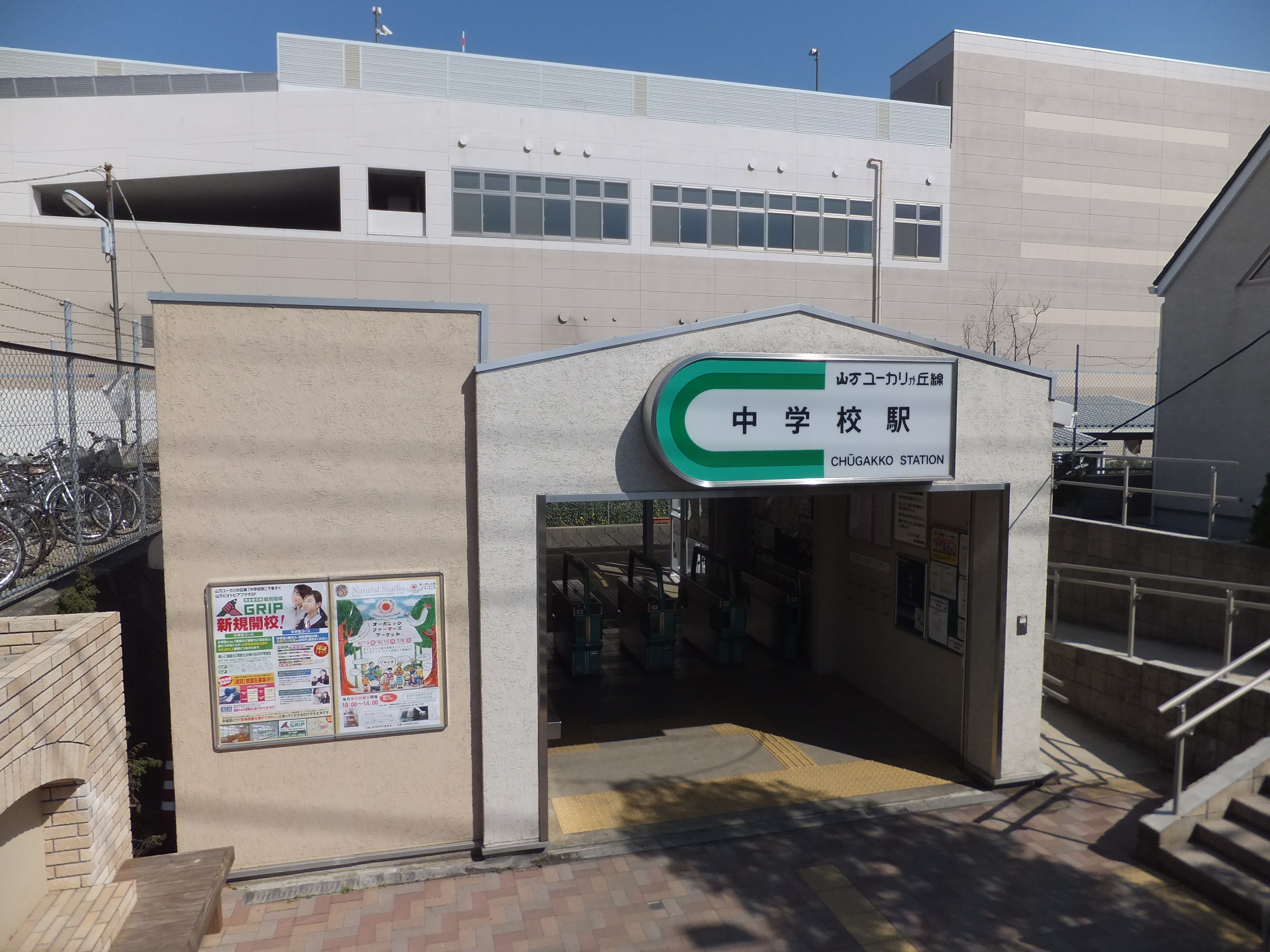
- Station entrance

General information
- Location: Sakura, Chiba; Japan
- Coordinates: 35°44′25″N 140°8′54″E
- Operator: Yamaman
- Line: Yūkarigaoka Line
- Distance: 2.8 km (1.7 mi) from Yūkarigaoka
- Platforms: 1 side platform
- Tracks: 1

Construction
- Structure type: Below-grade

Other information
- Status: Unstaffed

History
- Opened: 2 November 1982; 43 years ago

Services
Preceding station	Yamaman	Following station
Joshidai One-way operation	Yūkarigaoka Line	Ino towards Yūkarigaoka
Location

Chūgakkō Station (Japanese: 中学校駅, Hepburn: Chūgakkō-eki; lit. 'Middle School Station') is a people mover station in Sakura, Chiba Prefecture, Japan. It is on the Yamaman Yūkarigaoka Line, serving the planned community of Yūkarigaoka. Trains run roughly every 20 minutes.

Trains only run in one direction from this station, towards Ino Station. The station name refers to the nearby Ino Middle School.

== Gallery ==
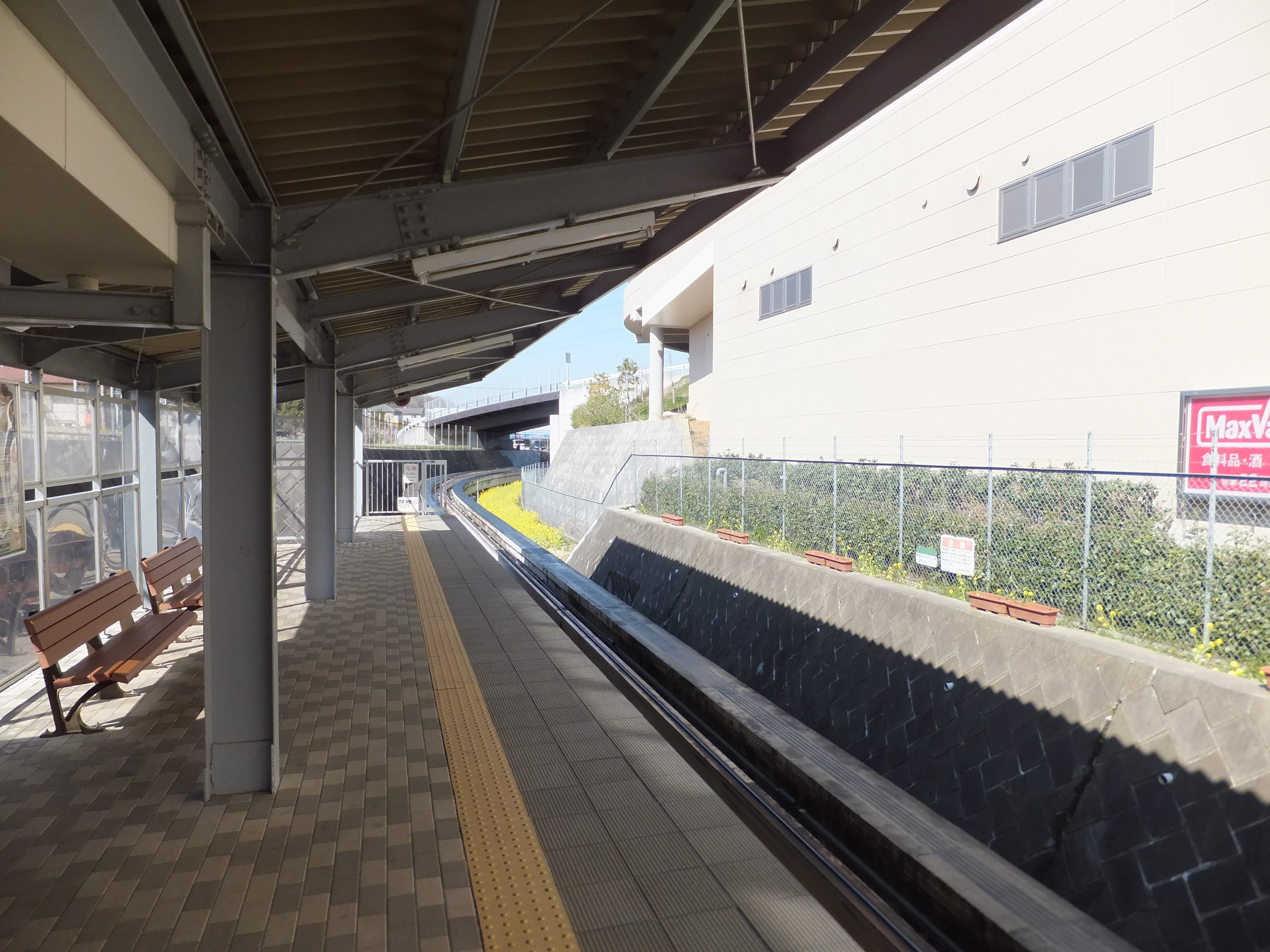
Station platform

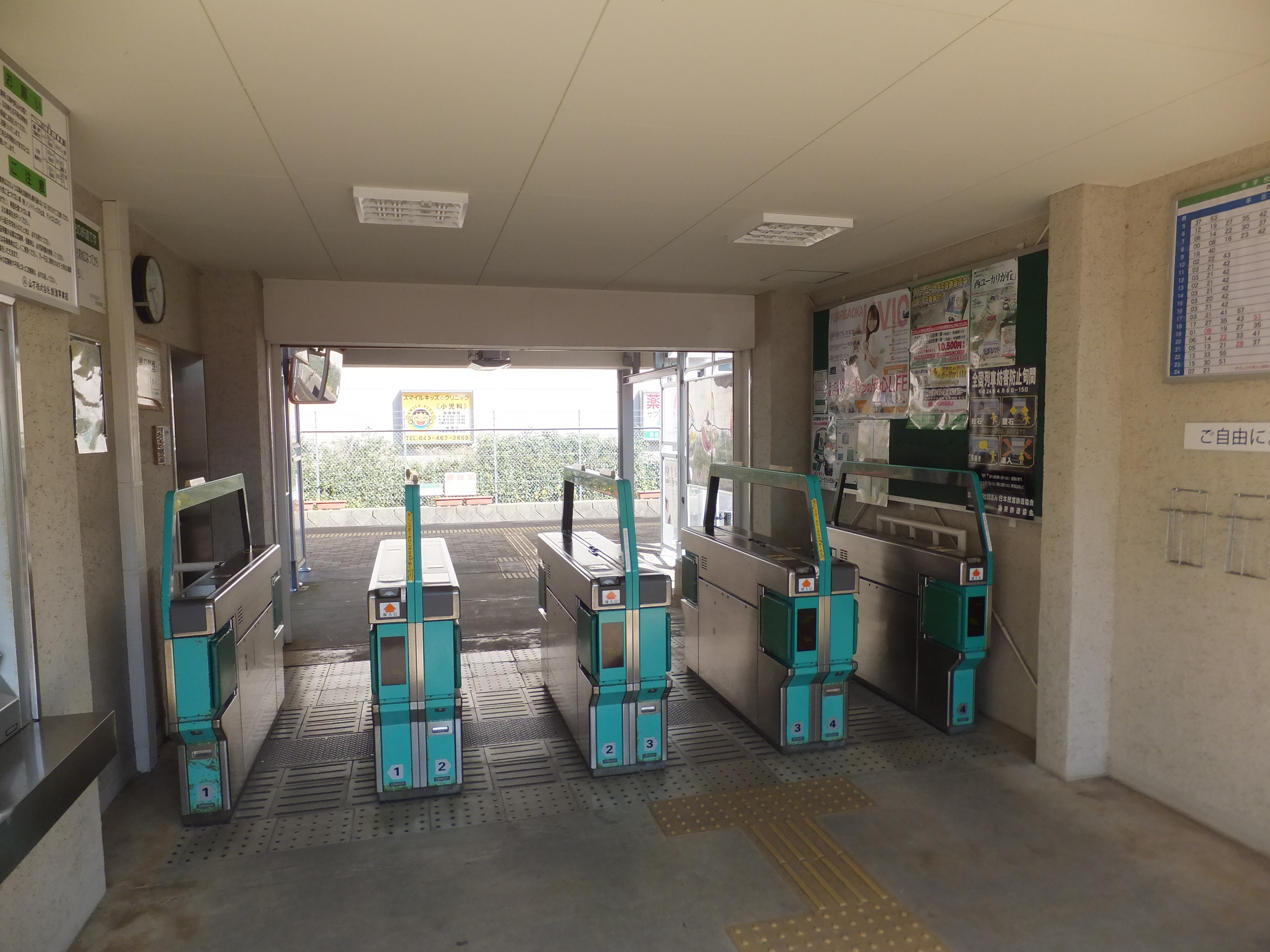
Station interior
