= Shizu Station (Chiba) =

Railway station in Sakura, Chiba Prefecture, Japan

KS32 Shizu Station 志津駅
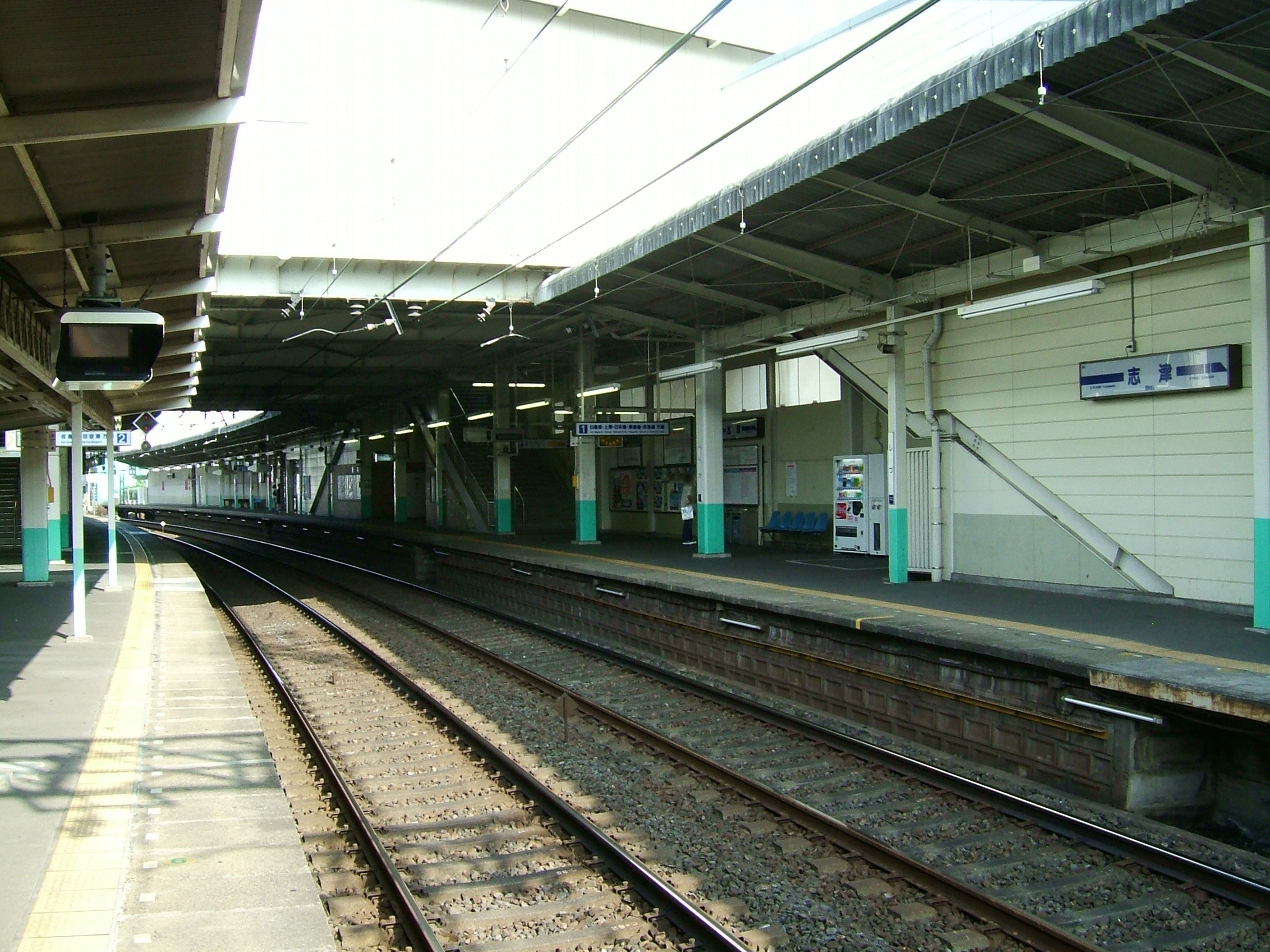
- Shizu Station

General information
- Location: 1669 Kami-Shizu, Sakura-shi, Chiba-ken 285-0846; Japan
- Coordinates: 35.7176°N 140.1448°E
- Operator: Keisei Electric Railway
- Line: Keisei Main Line
- Distance: 42.1 km from Keisei-Ueno
- Platforms: 2 side platforms

Construction
- Structure type: Elevated

Other information
- Station code: KS32
- Website: Official website

History
- Opened: 18 March 1928

Passengers
- FY2019: 15,716 daily

Services
Preceding station	Keisei	Following station
Katsutadai KS31 towards Keisei Ueno	Main Line Commuter Express Rapid Local	Yūkarigaoka KS33 towards Narita Airport Terminal 1
Location
- Location within Chiba Prefecture Location within Japan

Shizu Station (志津駅, Shizu-eki) is a passenger railway station in the city of Sakura, Chiba Prefecture, Japan, operated by the private railway operator Keisei Electric Railway.

== Lines ==
Shizu Station is served by the Keisei Main Line, and lies 42.1 kilometers from the Tokyo terminus of the line at Keisei-Ueno Station.

== Station layout ==
Shizu Station has two opposed side platforms connected by underpasses to a station building underneath.

=== Platforms ===
1	Keisei Main Line	for Keisei Tsudanuma, Keisei Takasago, Nippori, and Keisei Ueno
2	Keisei Main Line	for Keisei Narita, Higashi-Narita, and Narita Airport

== History ==
Shizu Station was opened on March 18, 1928. The station was rebuilt as an elevated station in 1981.

Station numbering was introduced to all Keisei Line stations on 17 July 2010. Shizu Station was assigned station number KS32.

== Passenger statistics ==
In fiscal 2019, the station was used by an average of 15,716 passengers daily.

== Surrounding area ==
- Sakura City Shizu Junior High School
- Sakura Shizu Post Office

== See also ==
- List of railway stations in Japan
