= Keiai University =

Coordinates: 35°39′19.77″N 140°08′39.81″E

- 敬愛大学; Keiai Daigaku
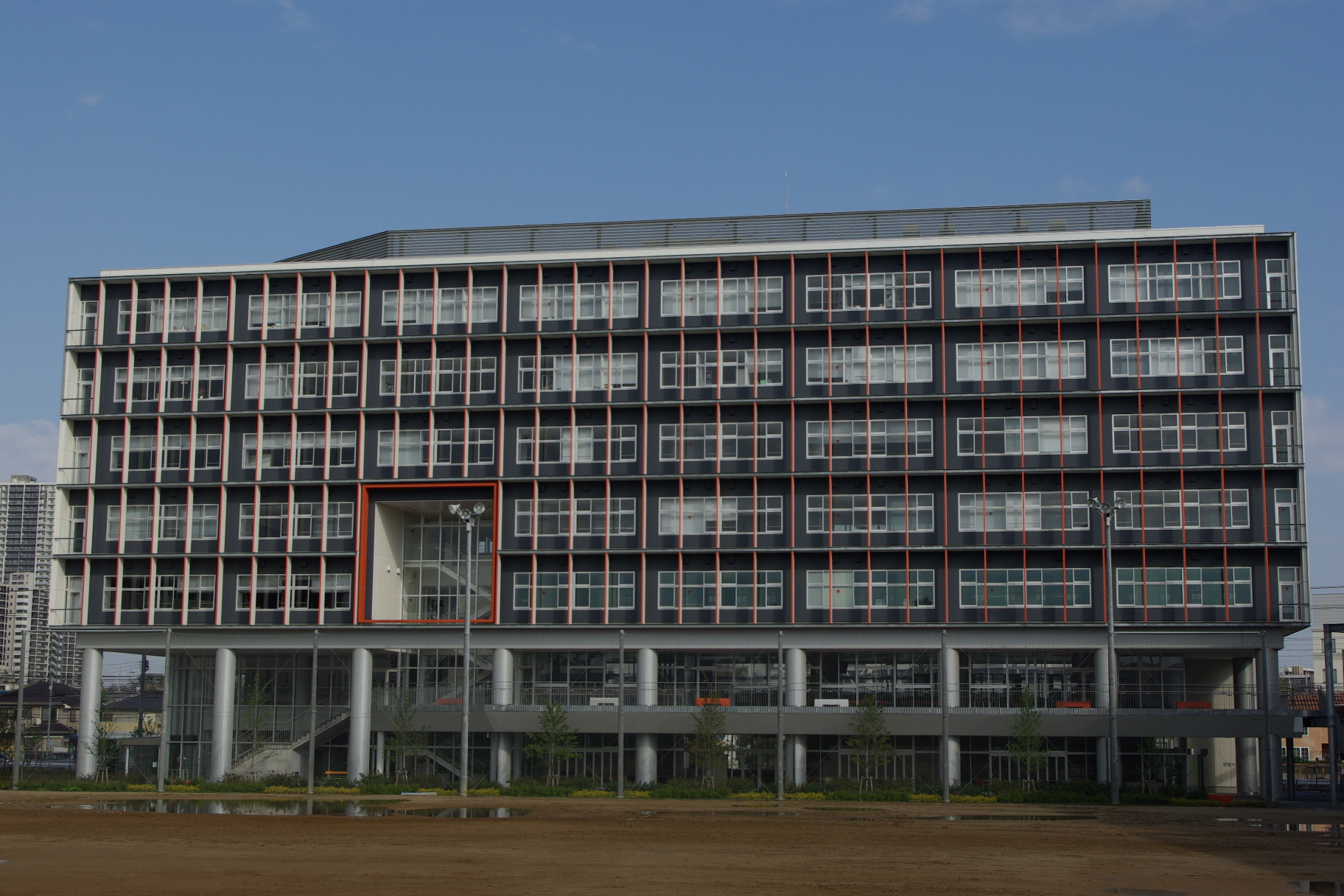
- Type: Private
- Established: 1921
- Location: Inage-ku, Chiba, Chiba, Japan
- Website: Official website

Keiai University (敬愛大学, Keiai Daigaku) is a private university in the city of Inage-ku, Chiba, Chiba Prefecture, Japan, established in 1966. The predecessor of the school was founded in 1921. The university has attached junior college, high schools and kindergarten.
