= Yūkarigaoka Station =

Railway station in Sakura, Chiba Prefecture, Japan

KS33 Yūkarigaoka Station ユーカリが丘駅
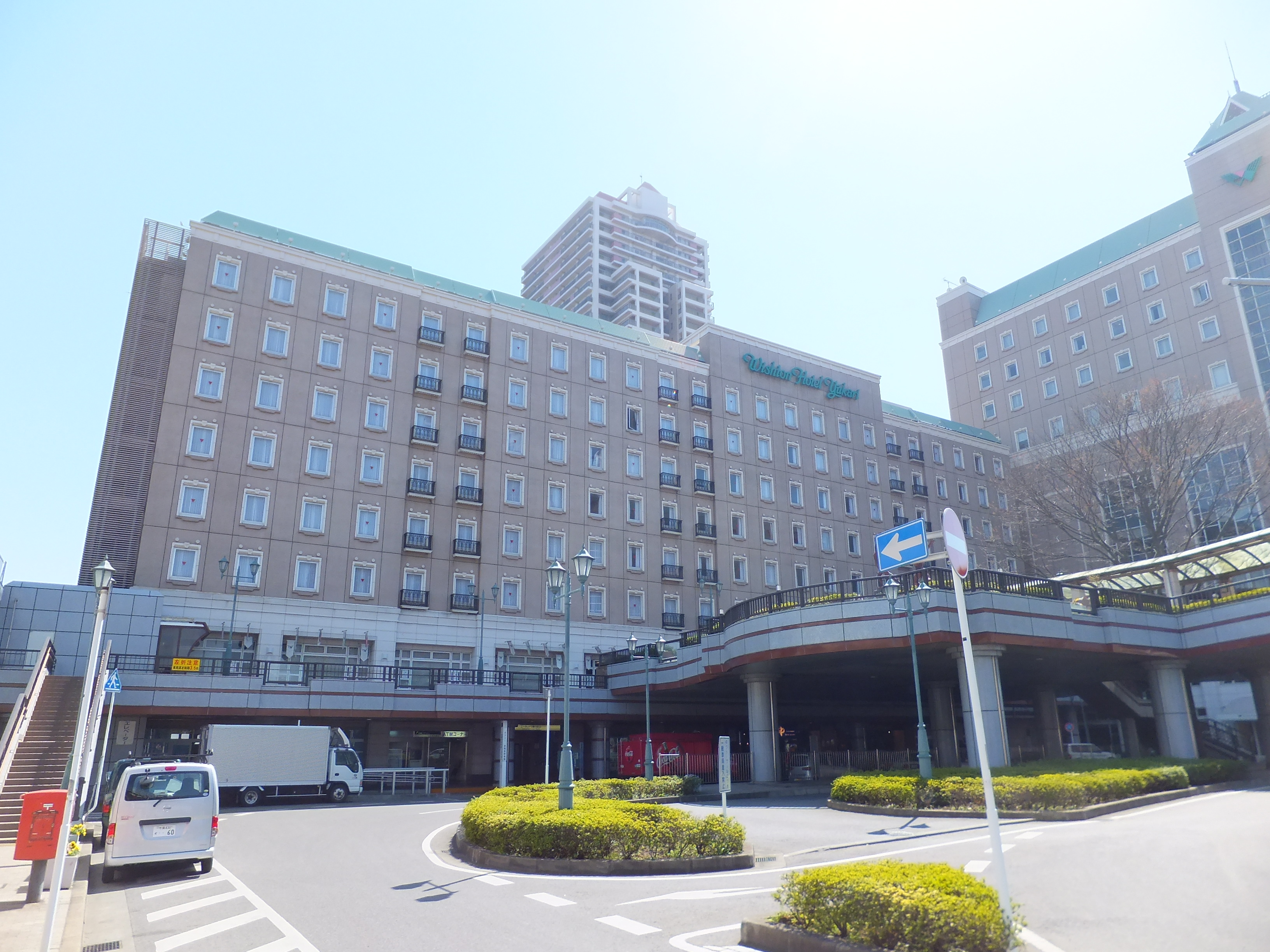
- Yūkarigaoka Station, April 2012

General information
- Location: 4 Yūkarigaoka; Sakura, Chiba; Japan
- Coordinates: 35°43′19″N 140°09′22″E
- Operator: Keisei Electric Railway; Yamaman
- Lines: Keisei Main Line; Yukarigaoka Line
- Distance: 43.2 km (26.8 mi) from Keisei-Ueno
- Platforms: Keisei: 1 side platform, 1 island platform; Yukarigaoka: 1 side platform

Other information
- Status: Staffed
- Station code: KS33
- Website: Official website

History
- Opened: 1 November 1982; 43 years ago

Passengers
- JFY2019: 21,456 daily (Keisei)

Services
| Preceding station | Keisei | Following station |
|---|---|---|
| Shizu KS32 towards Keisei Ueno | Main Line Commuter Express Rapid Local | Keisei Usui KS34 towards Narita Airport Terminal 1 |
| Preceding station | Yamaman | Following station |
| Terminus | Yūkarigaoka Line | Chiku Center towards Chūgakkō |
Location
- Location within Chiba Prefecture Location within Japan

Yūkarigaoka Station (Japanese: ユーカリが丘駅, Hepburn: Yūkarigaoka-eki) is an interchange passenger railway station in the Yūkarigaoka neighborhood of the city of Sakura, Chiba Prefecture, Japan, operated by Keisei Electric Railway.

== Lines ==
Yūkarigaoka Station is served by the Keisei Main Line, and is located 43.2 kilometres (26.8 mi) from the terminus of the line at Keisei-Ueno. The station is also served by the Yamaman Yukarigaoka Line.

== Station layout ==
The Keisei portion of the station has a single side platform and an island platform serving three tracks, connected to an elevated station building. The Yamaman portion of the station has a single side platform.

=== Platforms ===
==== Keisei Line ====
| 1-2 | Keisei Main Line | for Keisei Tsudanuma, Keisei Takasago, Nippori, Keisei Ueno, and Oshiage; Toei Asakusa Line for Asakusa, Nihombashi, and Nishi-magome |
| 3 | Keisei Main Line | for Higashi-Narita, Keisei Narita, and Narita Airport |

==== Yamaman Yukarigaoka Line ====
| 1 | ■ Yūkarigaoka Line | for Chūgakkō |

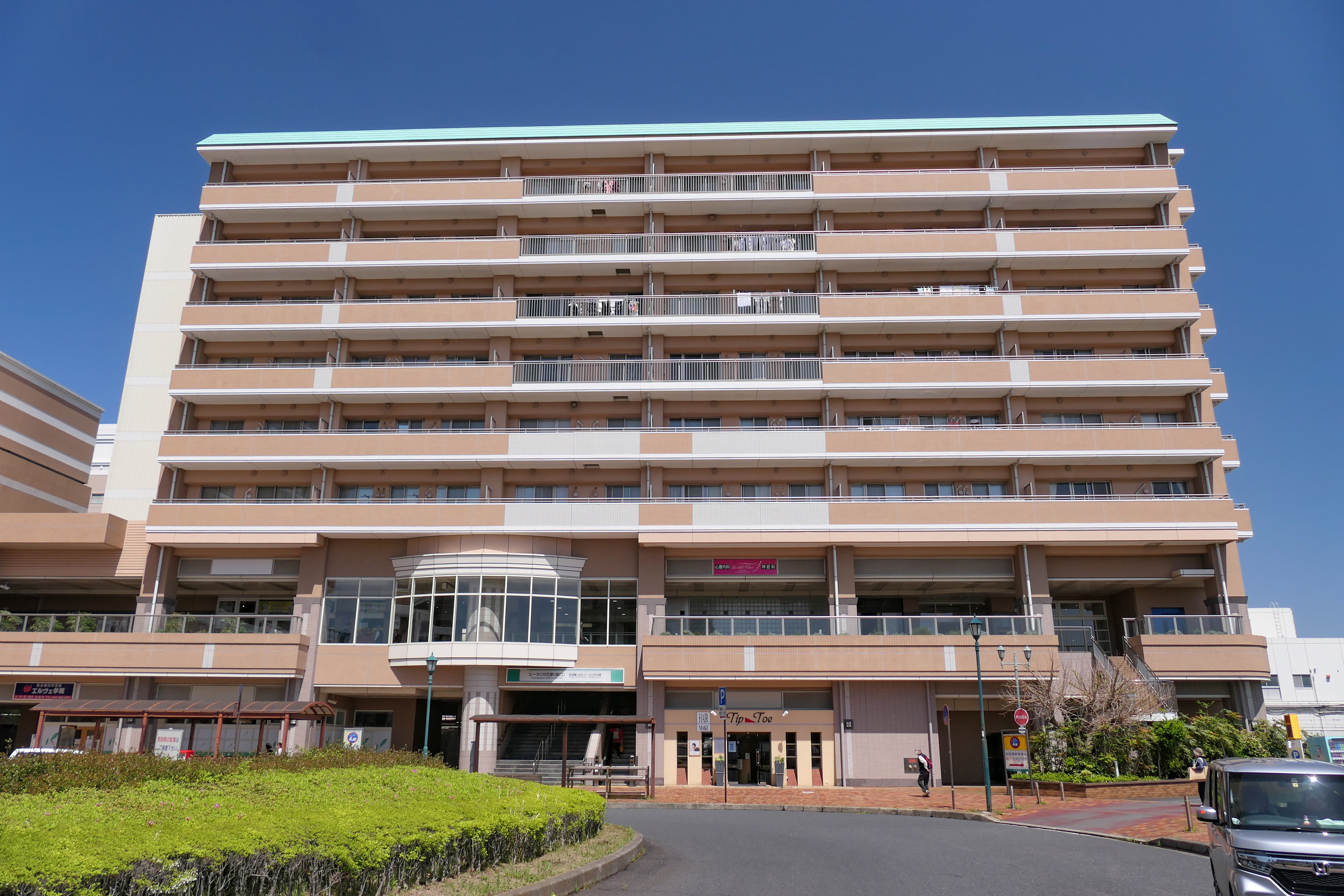
South entrance, April 2022

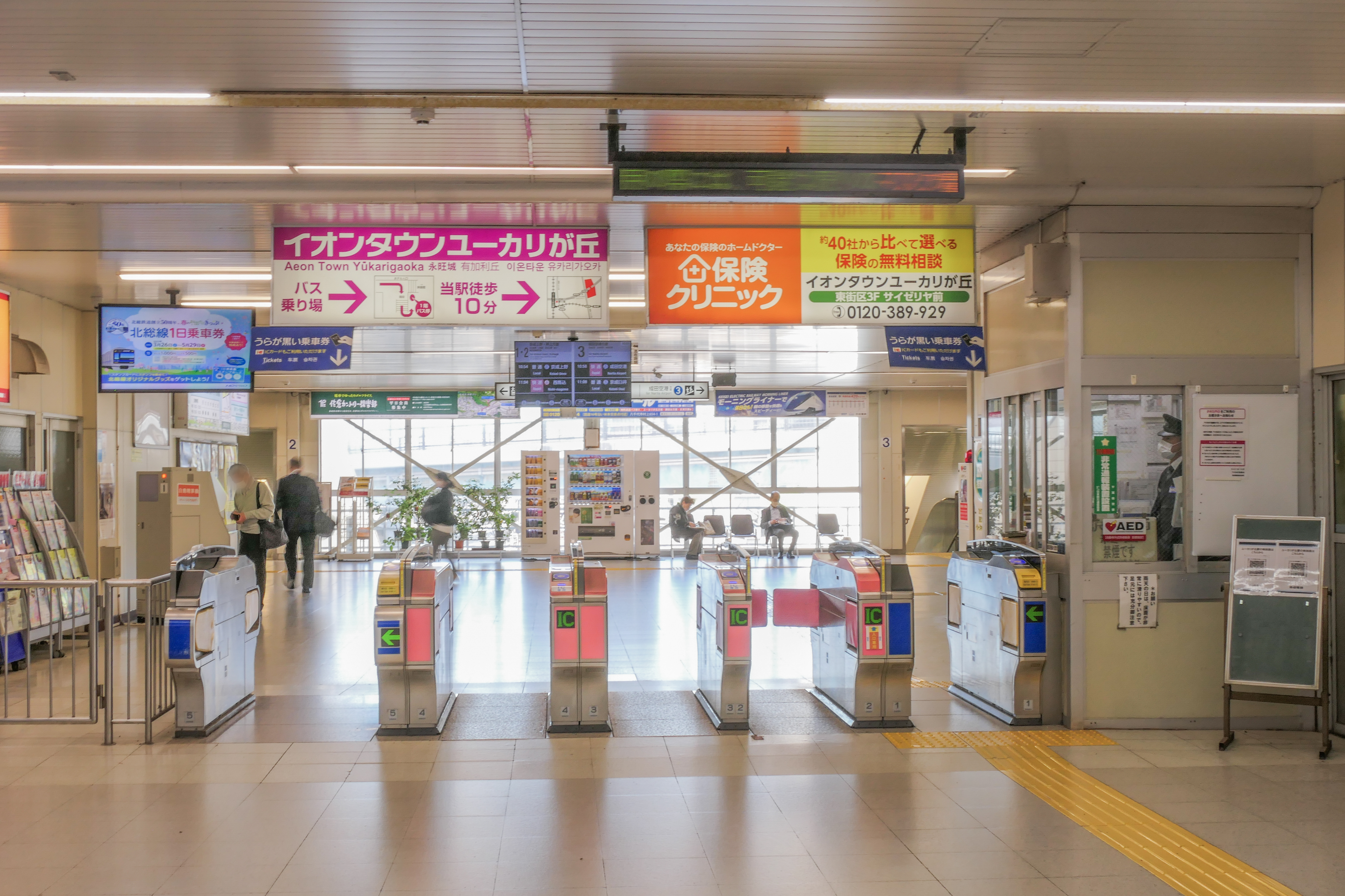
Keisei Line ticket gate, April 2022

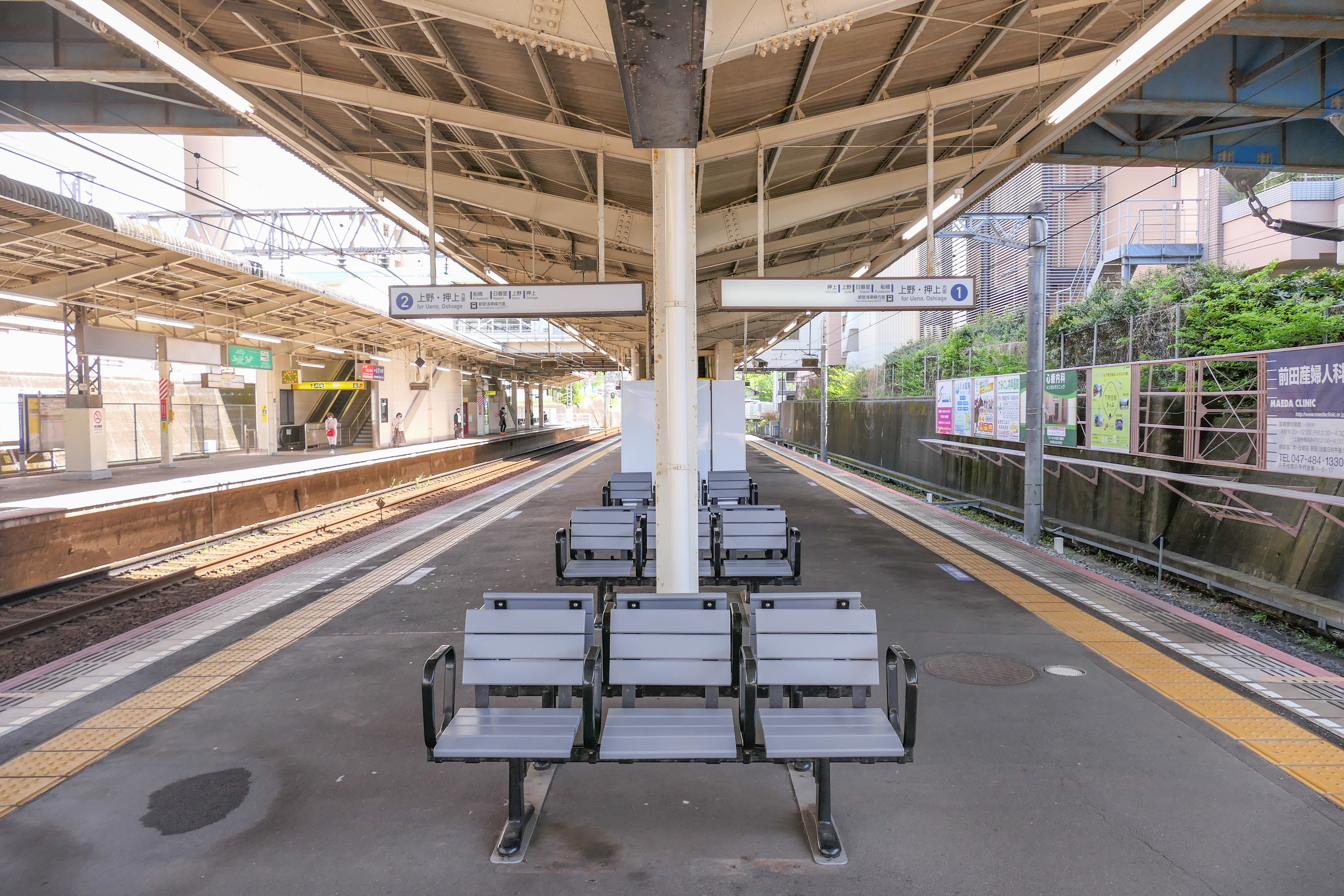
Keisei Line platforms, April 2022

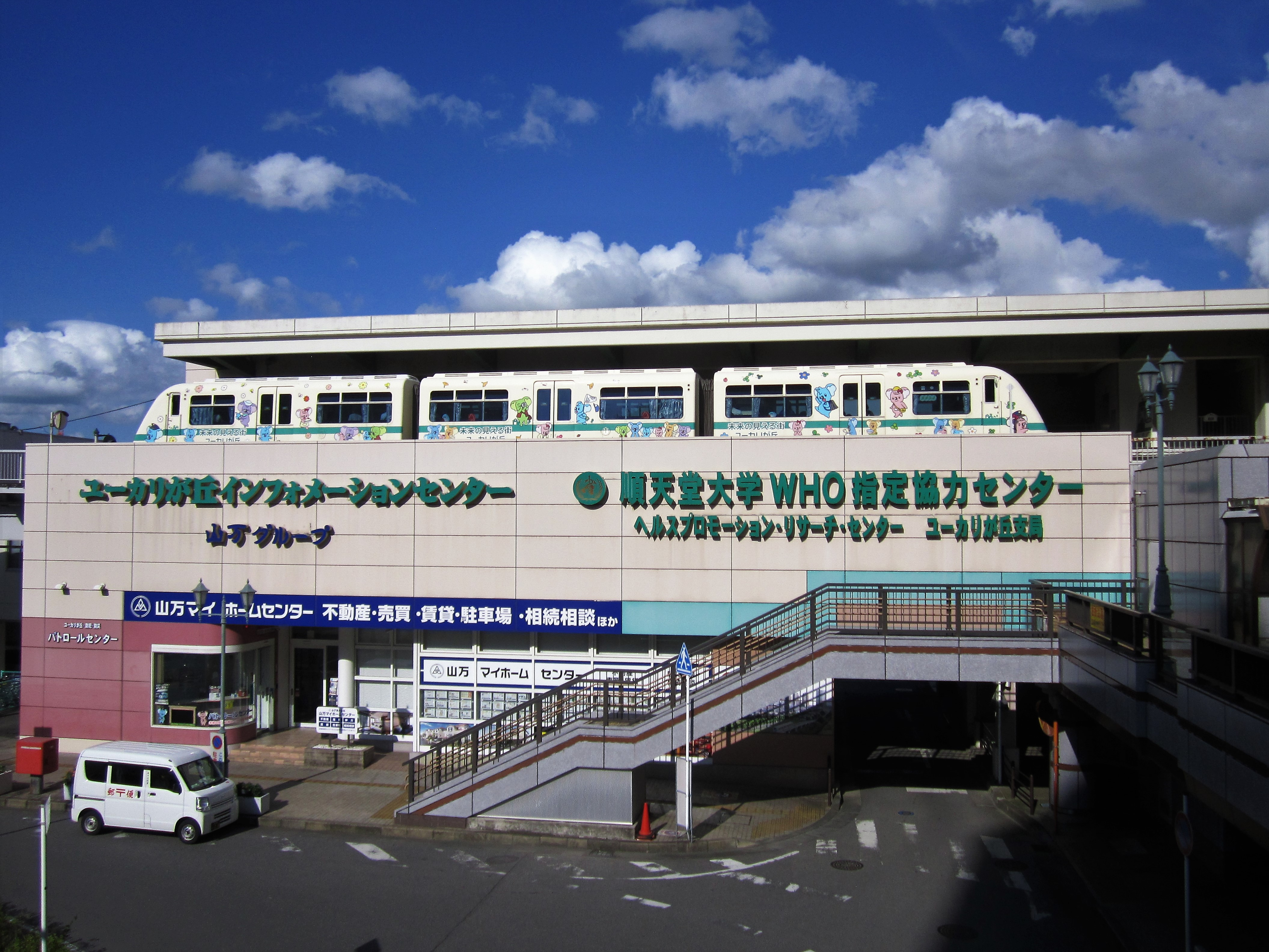
Yamaman Yukarigaoka Station, July 2019

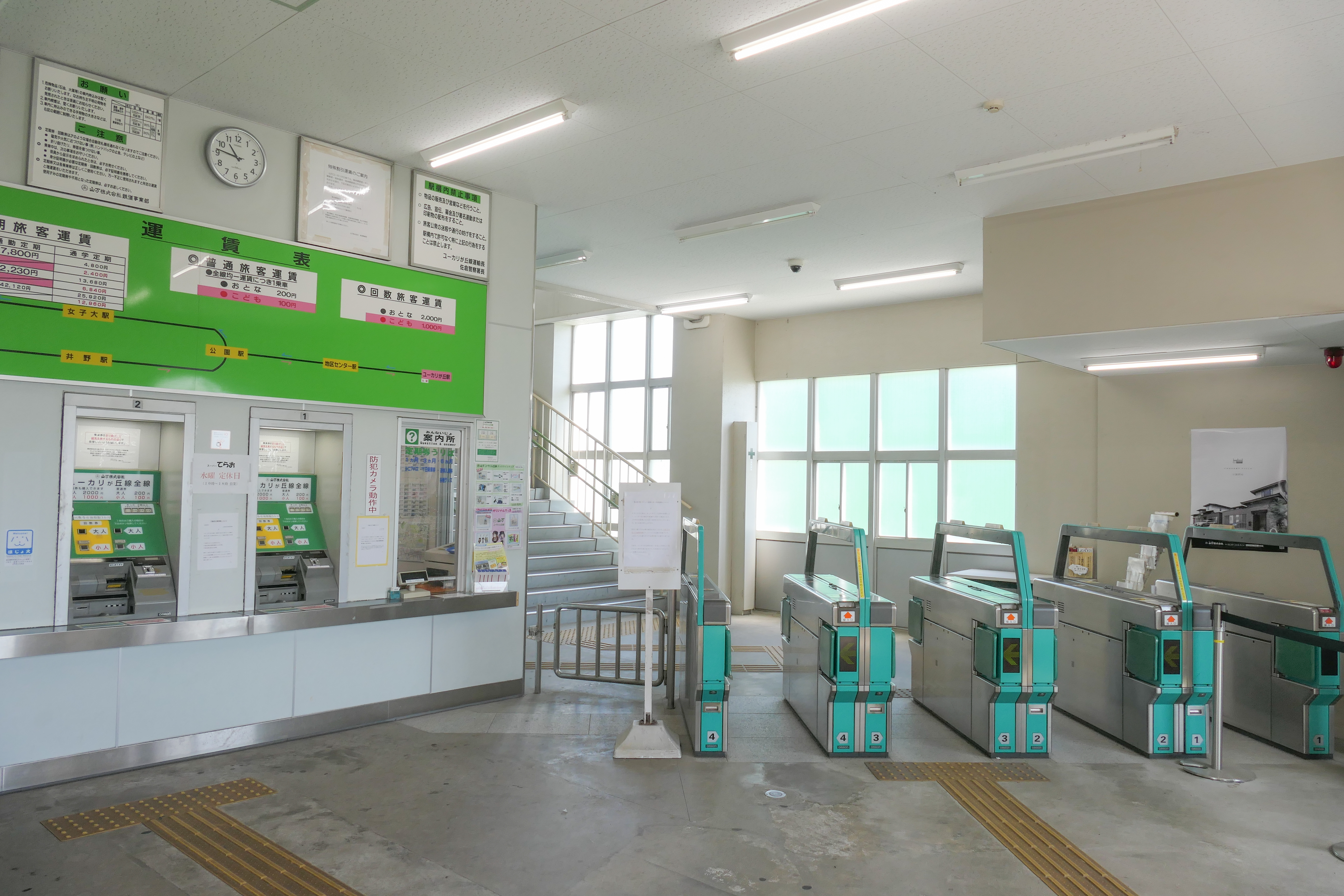
Yukarigaoka Line ticket gate, April 2022

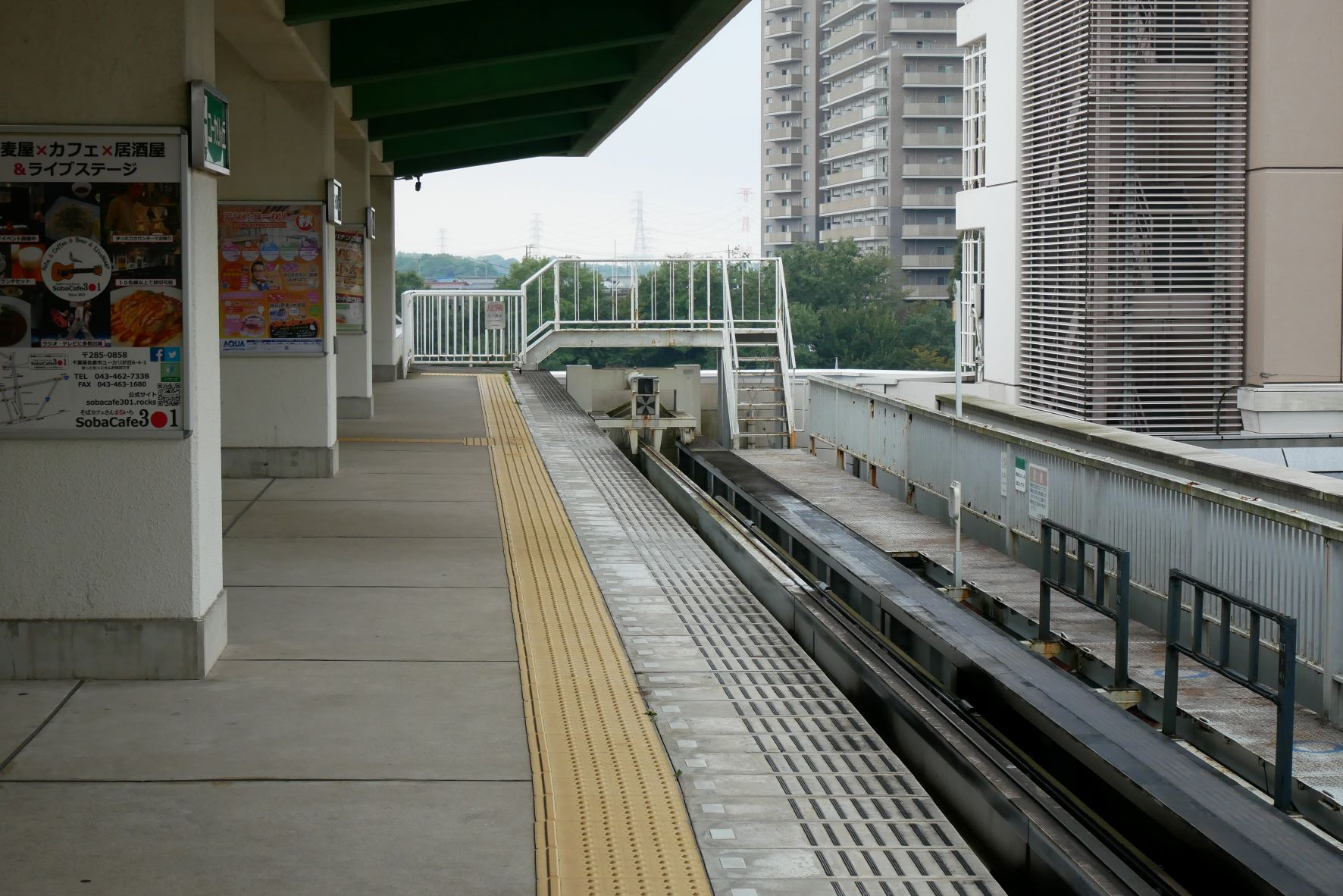
Yukarigaoka Line platform, September 2021

== History ==
Yūkarigaoka Station opened on 1 November 1982.

Station numbering was introduced to all Keisei Line stations on 17 July 2010. Yūkarigaoka Station was assigned station number KS32.

== Passenger statistics ==
In fiscal 2019, the station was used by an average of 21,456 passengers daily.

== Surrounding area ==
- Chiba Prefectural Sakura Nishi High School
- Sakura City Kamishizu Elementary School

== See also ==
- List of railway stations in Japan
