= Yūkarigaoka =

Coordinates: 35°43′19″N 140°09′22″E

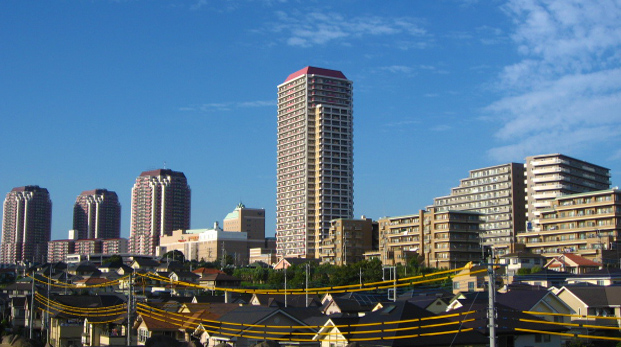
High-rise apartments in Yukarigaoka

Yūkarigaoka (ユーカリが丘) is a planned community development on a 250 hectare site in the city of Sakura, Chiba Prefecture, Japan by developer Yamaman Co Ltd. Development began in 1971 with a total planned population of 30,000. As of April 2024, the population was 18,943, consisting of 8,100 households.

While the name Yūkarigaoka translates literally as “eucalyptus hill”, Australian Eucalyptus trees do not occur in the area naturally.

== Transport ==
Yūkarigaoka serves as a bedroom community due to its proximity to central Tokyo. It is located roughly 60 minutes by Keisei Electric Railway's Keisei Line from Ueno Station. Yukarigaoka Station, built specifically for the new town development, is served by the Keisei Line and Yamaman Yūkarigaoka Line. The elevated Yamaman Yūkarigaoka Line, which exclusively serves Yūkarigaoka, is a manually-driven people mover system with a koala logo (koalas feed primarily on the leaves of eucalyptus trees). At least one hotel and a large multi-story shopping centre support the area.

== In popular culture ==
The 2005 Japanese movie Ainshutain Gāru (アインシュタインガール), or "Einstein Girl", takes place in Yūkarigaoka, and features the high-rise apartments, scenery such as Lake Inbanuma, and the Yamaman Yukarigaoka people mover.

== Gallery ==
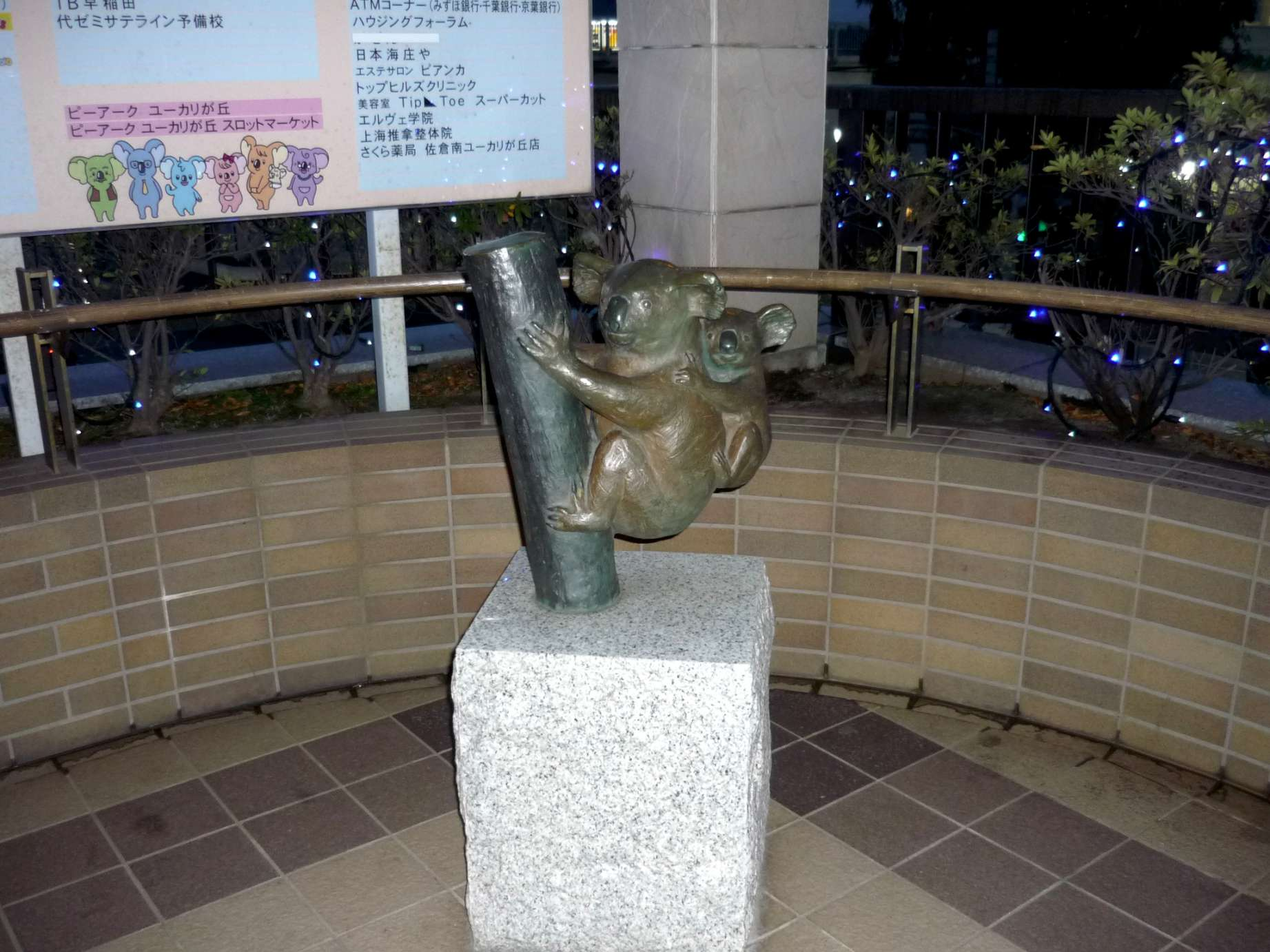
Yukarigaoka bronze of koalas

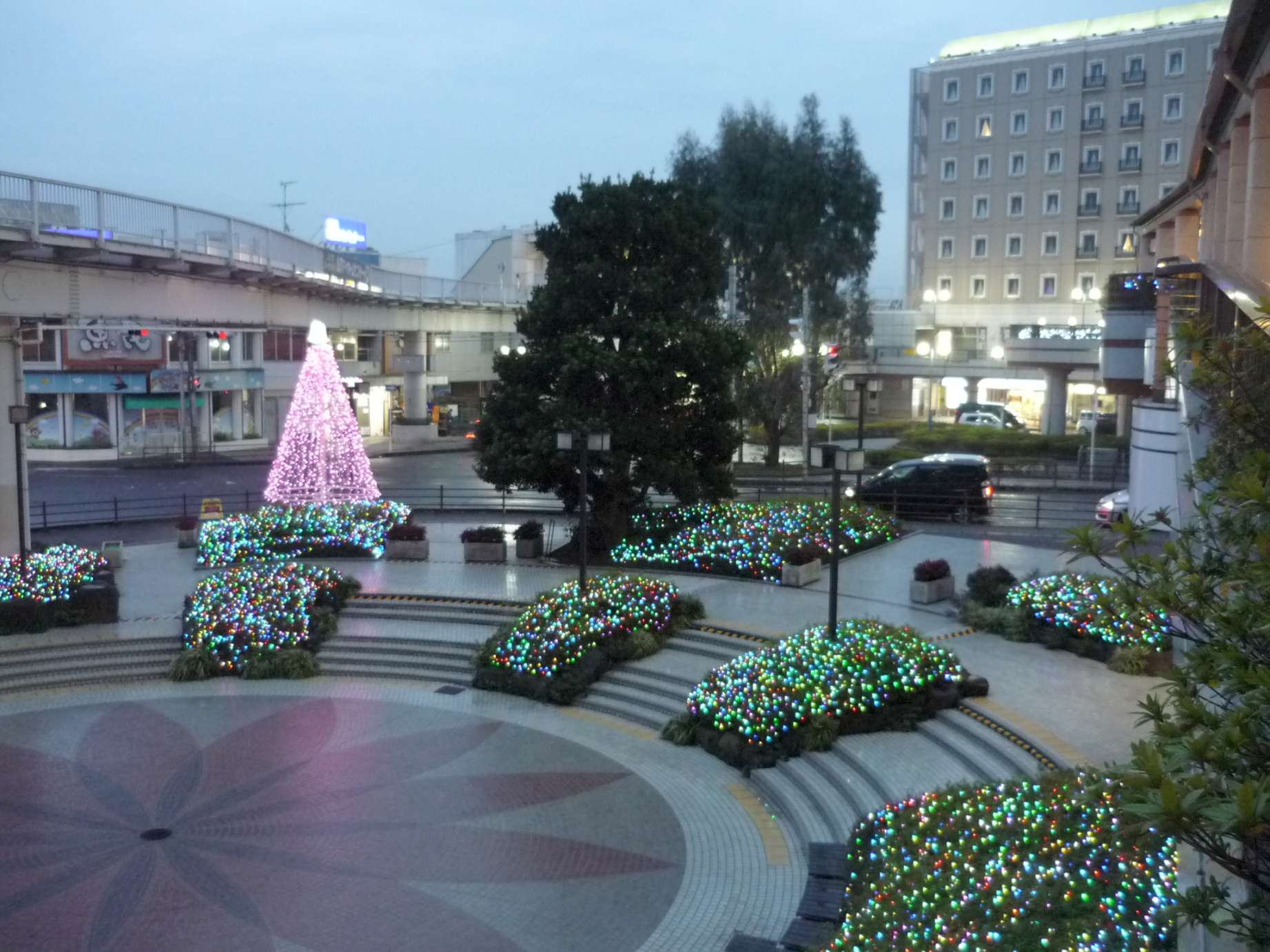
Yukarigaoka square near the railway station
