= Yukio Jitsukawa =

Japanese politician

- 実川 幸夫
- Official portrait, 2000

Member of the House of Representatives; from Southern Kanto
- In office 18 July 1993 – 21 July 2009
- Preceded by: Shinjirō Yamamura
- Succeeded by: Yasuhiko Wakai
- Constituency: Chiba 2nd (1993–1996); Chiba 9th (1996–2000); PR block (2000–2003); Chiba 13th (2003–2009)

Member of the Chiba Prefectural Assembly
- In office 1991–1993
- Constituency: Inba District

Personal details
- Born: 14 October 1943 (age 83) Tomisato, Chiba, Japan
- Party: Liberal Democratic
- Other political affiliations: JRP (1993–1994); NFP (1994–1997)
- Education: Hosei University
- Website: Official website

Yukio Jitsukawa (実川 幸夫, Jitsukawa Yukio; born 14 October 1943) is a former Japanese politician of the Liberal Democratic Party, who served as a member of the House of Representatives in the Diet (national legislature). A native of Narita, Chiba and graduate of Hosei University, he had served in the Chiba Prefectural Assembly from 1991 to 1993. He was elected to the House of Representatives for the first time in 1993.

== Early life ==
Jitsukawa was born in Tomisato, Inba District, Chiba Prefecture (now Tomisato City). After graduating from Narita High School, he studied at the Faculty of Law at Hosei University and graduated in 1967.

== Career ==
Jitsukawa became secretary to Shinjirō Yamamura in 1967, who was serving as a representative of Chiba 2nd district in the House of Representatives.

In 1991, he ran for the Chiba Prefectural Assembly election as a candidate endorsed by the Liberal Democratic Party and was elected for the first time. In 1993, he resigned from his position midway through his term and left the LDP. He ran for the 1993 House of Representatives election as a candidate endorsed by the Japan Renewal Party, and was elected. He later helped found the New Frontier Party, but rejoined the LDP in 1997 and was expelled from the NFP. He served as Parliamentary Vice-Minister of Transport in the Second Mori Cabinet and Deputy Minister of Justice in the Second Koizumi Cabinet. In 2004, he became Chairman of the House of Representatives General Affairs Committee. In 2006, he was appointed Deputy Director of the Party Organization Headquarters.

In the 2009 election, he lost to DPJ candidate Yasuhiko Wakai. In December of the same year, he announced his retirement from politics.

In November 2013, he was awarded the Grand Cordon of the Order of the Rising Sun, Gold and Silver Star in the autumn decorations.

As of November 2022, he serves as the chairman of the support group for Hisashi Matsumoto, who ran in the 2021 election for Chiba 13th district and was elected.
