= List of international presidential trips made by Gustavo Petro =

This is a list of international presidential trips made by Gustavo Petro, the 35th president of Colombia. Gustavo Petro has made 50 international trips to 25 countries during his presidency, which began on August 7, 2022, the date of his inauguration and ended on August 7, 2026.

== Summary ==
The number of visits per country where President Petro traveled are:

- One: Argentina, Chile, Dominican Republic, Ecuador, Egypt, Guatemala, Italy, Japan, Mexico, Peru, Portugal, Saint Vincent and the Grenadines and the United Arab Emirates
- Two: Belgium, China, Germany, Haiti, Spain, Switzerland and the Vatican City
- Three: Brazil, Cuba and France
- Five: United States
- Six: Venezuela

== 2022 ==
#	Country	Areas visited	Dates	Details	Image
1	Peru	Lima	August 18	Meeting with Pedro Castillo, Guillermo Lasso, president of Ecuador and Luis Arce, president of Bolivia.	
2	United States	New York City	September 17	Travel to New York City for the United Nations General Assembly.	
3	Venezuela	Caracas	November 1	Meeting with Nicolas Maduro, President of Venezuela.	
4	Egypt	Sharm El Sheikh	November 6	Attended the COP27 Environmental Summit	
4	Italy	Rome	November 8	Participation of the Food Safety Forum	
4	France	Paris	November 9	Meeting with the President of France, Emmanuel Macron	
5	Mexico	Mexico City	November 24–27	Bilateral meeting with the President of Mexico, Andrés Manuel López Obrador, Bilateral meeting with the mayoress of Mexico City, Claudia Sheinbaum.	

== 2023 ==
#	Country	Areas visited	Dates	Details	Image
1	Brazil	Brasília	January 2	Attendance at the Inauguration of President Lula da Silva	
2	Venezuela	Caracas	January 7	Extraordinary meeting with the president of Venezuela, Nicolas Maduro	
3	Chile	Santiago	January 9–10	Meeting with the President of Chile, Gabriel Boric	
4	Switzerland	Davos	January 13	Attendance at the World Economic Forum	
4	France	Toulouse	January 20	Bilateral meeting with the Prefect of the Occitanie Region, Étienne Guyot and the Mayor of Toulouse Jean-Luc Moudenc	
5	Argentina	Buenos Aires	January 24	Bilateral meeting with the President of Argentina, Alberto Fernández and participation in the 2023 CELAC summit	
6	Ecuador	Tulcán	January 31	Bilateral meeting between the Cabinets of Petro and Lasso	
7	Venezuela	Caracas	March 23	Bilateral meeting between Gustavo Petro and Nicolás Maduro	
8	Dominican Republic	Santo Domingo	March 24–25	Participation in the XXVIII Ibero-American Summit in Dominican Republic	
9	United States	Washington, D.C.	April 16–20	Bilateral meeting between Gustavo Petro and Joe Biden	
10	Spain	Madrid	May 3–5	State visit and meeting between Gustavo Petro and the King of Spain	
11	Portugal	Lisbon	May 7	Bilateral meeting between Gustavo Petro and Marcelo Rebelo de Sousa.	
12	Brazil	Brasília	May 30	Attendance at the 2023 South American summit	
13	Cuba	La Habana	June 9-10	Bilateral meeting with the president of Cuba, Miguel Diaz-Canel and six-month ceasefire agreement with ELN.	
14	Germany	Berlin	June 13	Bilateral meeting with the President of Germany, Frank-Walter Steinmeier, Federal Chancellor Olaf Scholz and with the directors of the Parliament, with the purpose of strengthening bilateral relations between both nations as well as their Assistance to the Federal Association of German Industry, in addition to a meeting with presidents of different companies of gas production, energy, infrastructure, steel industry, telecommunications.	
14	France	Paris	June 27	Attendance at the Summit for a New Global Financial Pact, an event convened by President Emmanuel Macron.	
15	Belgium	Brussels	July 17-18	Participation in the regional summit between the European Union and Celac. The president was received by the President of the European Commission, Ursula von der Leyen, and by the President of the European Council, Charles Michel. Then he attended the Official Opening and the I Plenary Session of the Summit, as well as the taking of the official photo of the Heads of State and Government participating in the event.	
16	Brazil	Belém	August 8-9	Participation in the meeting will involve leaders and environment ministers of the countries that share the Amazon biome. The idea, as they have explained, is to strengthen environmental protection mechanisms and stop deforestation in the Amazon by 2030.	
17	Costa Rica	San José	August 28-30	Bilateral meeting with President Rodrigo Chaves to discuss key issues such as energy transition, sustainable tourism, trade and migration, which are relevant both regionally and globally, in order to foster dialogue and cooperation. Meeting with the judges of the Inter-American Court of Human Rights. Received an honorary doctorate for his contributions to peace from the Rector of the University for Peace, Francisco Rojas.	
18	Chile	Santiago	September 10-12	Participation in the events commemorating the coup d'état of September 11, 1973 in Chile. Meeting between the former President of Uruguay, José Mujica, accompanied by the Minister of Foreign Affairs, Álvaro Leyva, and the 29th President of Colombia, Ernesto Samper.	
19	Cuba	La Habana	September 15-16	Participated in the Summit of Heads of State and Government of the multilateral group G77 + China.	
20	United States	New York	September 17-20	Participated in the United Nations General Assembly. Held a meeting with President Joe Biden in the Metropolitan Museum of Art. Met with United Nations Secretary General António Guterres.	
21	Mexico	Chiapas	October 21-23	Participation in the Latin American and Caribbean Conference on Migration in Chiapas, Mexico.	
22	China	Beijing	October 24-26	Traveled to China in order to strengthen economic relations and engage in dialogue on transportation systems in both countries, as well as the construction of Bogotá's first metro by Chinese companies. Later on Wednesday he held a meeting with President Xi Jinping which resulted in the signing of a plan for the growth of bilateral relations and cooperation instruments.	
23	United States	Washington, D.C.	November 2	met with President Joe Biden in Washington, D.C. within the framework of the Alliance for Economic Prosperity in the Americas.	
24	United States	San Francisco	November 16-17	Participation in the Asia-Pacific Economic Cooperation forum, representing Colombia as a guest country, with its main objective being to obtain full membership. Also made a three-minute intervention where he addressed the importance of sustainability, climate and economic transition.	
25	Venezuela	Caracas	November 18	Held his fifth meeting with President Nicolás Maduro in all of 2023.	
26	Ecuador	Quito	November 24	Participation in the inauguration of President Daniel Noboa. Later he held a meeting with the 31st President Álvaro Uribe.	

== 2024 ==
#	Country	Areas visited	Dates	Details	Image
1	Venezuela	Caracas	January 7	Met with President Nicolás Maduro.	
2	Guatemala	Guatemala City	January 14	Participated in the inauguration of President Bernardo Arévalo. Met with President of Honduras Xiomara Castro.	
3	Switzerland	Davos	January 15-17	Assisted to the World Economic Forum. Held a meeting with Bill Gates.	
4	Vatican City	Vatican City	January 18	Meeting with Pope Francis.	
5	Germany	Munich	February 16	Participated in the Munich Security Conference.	
6	Saint Vincent and the Grenadines	Kingstown	March 1	Assisted to the CELAC summit.	
7	Venezuela	Caracas	April 9	Meeting with President Nicolás Maduro.	
8	France	Paris	July 26	Petro travelled to Paris to attend the 2024 Summer Olympics opening ceremony.	

== 2025 ==
#	Country	Areas visited	Dates	Details	Image
1	Haiti	Jacmel	January 22	Met with Transitional Presidential Council chairman Leslie Voltaire.	
2	United Arab Emirates	Dubai	February 11-15	Attended the World Governments Summit 2025. Met with President Mohamed bin Zayed Al Nahyan and Vice President Mohammed bin Rashid Al Maktoum.	
3	China	Beijing	May 14	Met with General Secretary and President Xi Jinping.	
4	Vatican City	Vatican City	May 19	Attended the Papal inauguration of Pope Leo XIV.	
5	Haiti	Port-au-Prince	July 18	Attended the inauguration of the Colombian embassy. Met with acting Prime Minister Alix Didier Fils-Aimé.	
6	Japan	Osaka	September 5	Visited the Expo 2025. Met with Parliamentary Vice-Minister of Foreign Affairs Hisashi Matsumoto.	
7	Belgium	Brussels	October 9	Attended the Global Gateway Forum.	

== 2026 ==
#	Country	Areas visited	Dates	Details	Image
1	United States	Washington, D.C.	February 3–4	Met with U.S. President Donald Trump at the White House to discuss bilateral relations, migration, security, and counternarcotics cooperation.	
2	Venezuela	Caracas	April 24	Met with acting Venezuelan President Delcy Rodríguez at Miraflores Palace to discuss border security, migration, trade, and regional cooperation.	
3	Spain	Barcelona	April 18	Attended the 4th In Defense of Democracy summit.	
4	Cuba	Havana	July 31	Official visit. Met with President Miguel Díaz-Canel.	

== Multilateral meetings ==
Multilateral meetings of the following intergovernmental organizations took place during Gustavo Petros presidency (2022–Present).

Intergovernmental organizations
Group	Year				
Group	2022	2023	2024	2025	2026
APEC	Not an APEC Member	November 15–17 (United States) San Francisco	Not an APEC Member		
EU–CELAC	None	17–18 July, (Belgium) Brussels	None	9 November, (Colombia) Santa Marta	None
G20	Not a G20 Member		November 18–19 (Brazil) Rio de Janeiro	Not a G20 Member	
SOA (OAS)		None			TBA, (Dominican Republic) Punta Cana
UNCCC	6 November (Egypt) Sharm el-Sheikh	30 November – 3 December (United Arab Emirates) Dubai	12 November (Azerbaijan) Baku	10 November, (Brazil) Belém	
██ = Future event

== See also ==
- 2022 Colombian presidential election
- Foreign relations of Colombia
- List of international presidential trips made by Iván Duque, his predecessor
- List of international presidential trips made by Abelardo de la Espriella, his successor
- President of Colombia
- Presidency of Gustavo Petro
