= List of international presidential trips made by Juan Manuel Santos =

This is a list of international presidential trips made by Juan Manuel Santos, the 33rd president of Colombia. Juan Manuel Santos made 46 international trips to 26 countries during his presidency, which began on August 7, 2010 and ended on August 7, 2018.

== Summary ==
The number of visits per country where President Santos traveled are:

- One: China, Costa Rica, Cuba, Ecuador, France, Germany, Guatemala, Guyana, Israel, Japan, Norway, Palestine, Saint Kitts and Nevis, Singapore, South Korea, Switzerland, Vatican City
- Two: Canada and Peru
- Three: Brazil, Chile and the United Kingdom
- Four: Argentina and Venezuela
- Five: United States
- Six: Mexico

Map of international trips made by Juan Manuel Santos as president: Colombia 5 trips 4 trips 3 trips 2 trips 1 trip 0 trips

== 2010 ==
	Dates	Country	Locations	Details
1	September 1–2	Brazil	Brasília, São Paulo	State Visit Meeting with the president Luiz Inácio Lula da Silva and with the president of Congress José Sarney.
2	September 14	Mexico	Mexico City	Participation in the Dinner in honor of Heads of State and Government in commemoration of the Bicentennial of Mexico.
3	September 21–24	United States	New York City	Participation in the 65th United Nations General Assembly.
4	September 30–October 1	Argentina	Buenos Aires	Participation in the extraordinary summit of Unasur.
5	October 28–29	Argentina	Buenos Aires	Attendance at the funerals of the former president Néstor Kirchner.
6	November 2	Venezuela	Caracas	Meeting with President Hugo Chávez.
7	November 7	Mexico	Mérida	Participation in the 66th General Assembly of the Inter-American Press Association (IAPA).
8	November 19	Jamaica	Kingston	Official Visit.
9	November 26	Guyana	Georgetown	Participation in the IV South American Summit of Unasur.
10	December 3-4	Argentina	Mar del Plata	Participation in the XX Ibero-American Summit of Heads of State.
11	December 6	United States	New York City	Ninth session of the Assembly of States Parties to the International Criminal Court.
12	December 31–January 1, 2011	Brazil	Brasília	Inauguration of the president of Brazil Dilma Rousseff.

== 2011 ==
	Dates	Country	Locations	Details
13	January 23–26	France	Paris	Official Visit.
13	January 26–27	Switzerland	Davos	Attendance at the World Economic Forum.
14	April 4-7	United States	Providence (Rhode Island) - New York City - Washington, D.C.	Participation in the Ibero-American Forum - High-level meeting of the United Nations Security Council - Meeting with President Barack Obama.
15	April 10-12	Spain	Madrid	Official Visit.
15	April 12-13	Germany	Berlin	Official Visit.
16	April 28	Peru	Lima	Summit with the presidents of Peru, Chile, and Mexico: signing of the Deep Integration Agreement (AIP).
17	June 22	Guatemala	Guatemala City	Attendance at the International Conference in Support of the Central American Security Strategy.
18	July 2	Saint Kitts and Nevis	Basseterre	Conference of Heads of State and Government of the Caribbean Community CARICOM.
19	July 27-28	Peru	Lima	Inauguration of the president of Peru Ollanta Humala.
20	July 30-August 2	Mexico	Mexico City	Official Visit.
21	August 14-17	Chile	Santiago	State Visit.
21	August 17-18	Argentina	Buenos Aires	Official Visit.
22	September 11-14	Japan	Tokyo	Working Visit.
22	September 14-16	South Korea	Seoul - Panmunjom	Official Visit.
23	September 20-22	United States	New York City	Address at the United Nations General Assembly.
23	September 22	Canada	Toronto	Reception of the Statesman of the Year Award, granted by the Canadian Council for the Americas.
24	November 18-19	Turkey	Ankara	Official Visit.
24	November 19-22	United Kingdom	London	Official Visit, Meeting with Queen Elizabeth II.
25	November 28	Venezuela	Caracas	Meeting with President Hugo Chávez.
26	December 19	Ecuador	Quito	Official Visit.

== 2012 ==
	Dates	Country	Locations	Details
27	March 1	Cuba	Havana	Meeting of the president of Cuba Raúl Castro.
28	May 6-7	Singapore	Singapore	State Visit.
28	May 7-11	China	Beijing; Shanghai	State Visit.
29	May 25	United States	New York City	Opening of trading on the New York Stock Exchange.
30	June 6	Chile	Cerro Paranal	Attendance at the IV Presidential Summit of the Pacific Alliance.
31	June 15	Costa Rica	San José	Official Visit.
32	June 18-19	Mexico	Los Cabos	Attended the 2012 G20 Los Cabos summit.
33	June 20-21	Brazil	Rio de Janeiro	Participation in the Conference Rio+20.
34	August 16	Dominican Republic	Santo Domingo	Inauguration of the president Danilo Medina.
35	December 1	Mexico	Mexico City	Inauguration of the president Enrique Peña Nieto, and resignation meeting with Daniel Ortega.

== 2013 ==
	Dates	Country	Locations	Details
36	January 26-28	Chile	Santiago	Participation in the I CELAC-EU Summit.
39	March 8	Venezuela	Caracas	Attendance at the funeral ceremony of Hugo Chávez.
40	May 12	Vatican City	Vatican City	Attendance at the canonization of Mother Laura.
41	June 6	United Kingdom	London	Meeting with students and teachers from the University of Oxford.
42	June 8-11	Israel	Jerusalem	State visit.
42	June 9	Palestine	Ramallah	State visit.

== 2016 ==
	Dates	Country	Locations	Details
43	October 31-November 3	United Kingdom	London, Belfast	State visit, meeting and lunch with Queen Elizabeth II, accommodation at Buckingham Palace
44	December 9-12	Norway	Oslo	Audience with King Harald V and meeting with Prime Minister Erna Solberg. Reception of the Nobel Peace Prize.

== 2017 ==
	Dates	Country	Locations	Details
45	May 18	United States	Washington, D. C.	Held with President Donald Trump joint news conference at the White House, where Trump praised Colombia's efforts to end a 52-year civil war that left more than 220,000 dead as a "great thing to watch."
46	October 30	Canada	Ottawa	State visit, met with Prime Minister Justin Trudeau.

== Multilateral meetings ==
Multilateral meetings of the following intergovernmental organizations took place during Juan Manuel Santos' presidency (2010–2018).

Group	Year								
Group	2010	2011	2012	2013	2014	2015	2016	2017	2018
EU–CELAC	none			January 26–27 (Chile) Santiago	None	June 10 (Belgium) Brussels	None	October 26–27 (El Salvador) San Salvador	None
SOA (OAS)	none	none	April 14–15 (Colombia) Cartagena	none	none	April 10–11; Panama City	none	none	April 13–14 (Peru) Lima
Others	None		G20; June 18–19 (Mexico) Los Cabos						

== See also ==
- 2010 Colombian presidential election
- Foreign relations of Colombia
- List of international presidential trips made by Iván Duque, his successor
