= List of international presidential trips made by Abelardo de la Espriella =

Visits by the president of Colombia since 2026

This is a list of international presidential trips made by Abelardo de la Espriella, the 36th president of Colombia. Abelardo de la Espriella has served as president since August 7, 2026, the date of his inauguration. As of November 15, 2026, de la Espriella has not made an international trip as president.

== Summary ==
As of November 15, 2026, de la Espriella has yet to travel abroad during his presidency. During the presidential transition and throughout his first 100 days in office, he maintained a policy of focusing on domestic security and governing from Colombia’s regions, delegating international travel and diplomatic representation to Vice President José Manuel Restrepo and cabinet ministers. For instance, although a presidential visit to Israel had been rumored following the administration's decision to restore bilateral ties, Colombia's new embassy in Jerusalem was ultimately inaugurated on October 14, 2026, by Foreign Minister Omar Bula Escobar.

== Multilateral meetings ==
De la Espriella is scheduled or expected to attend the following regular summits during his presidency (2026–2030), subject to confirmation:

| Group | Year | | | | |
| Group | 2026 | 2027 | 2028 | 2029 | 2030 |
|---|---|---|---|---|---|
| UNGA | 22–25 September, (United States) ^{[a]} New York City | TBD, (United States) New York City | TBD, (United States) New York City | TBD, (United States) New York City | |
| COP | 9–20 November, (Turkey) ^{[b]} Antalya (COP31) | TBD | TBD | TBD | |
| CELAC | TBD | TBD | TBD | TBD | |
| Summit of the Americas | TBD, (Dominican Republic) Punta Cana (10th) | none | TBD | none | |
██ = Future / expected event ██ = None scheduled ██ = Did not attend ██ = Presidency ends^a Vice President José Manuel Restrepo delivered Colombia's national statement.^b Environment Minister Fabio Arjona led Colombia's technical delegation; the country did not participate in the leaders' summit.

== See also ==
- 2026 Colombian presidential election
- Foreign relations of Colombia
- List of international presidential trips made by Gustavo Petro, his predecessor
- President of Colombia
