= Chiba 13th district =

Electoral constituency in Chiba Prefecture, Japan

- Parliamentary constituency for the Japanese House of Representatives
- Numbered map of the Chiba Prefecture single seats
- Prefecture: Chiba
- Proportional District: Southern Kanto
- Electorate: 418,377

Current constituency
- Created: 2002
- Seats: One
- Party: LDP
- Representatives: Hisashi Matsumoto
- Municipalities: Cities of Abiko, Inzai, Kamagaya, Shiroi, and Tomisato District of Iba

Chiba 13th district (千葉県第13区, Chiba-ken dai-ju-sanku or simply 千葉13区, Chiba-ju-sanku) is a single-member constituency of the House of Representatives in the national Diet of Japan located in Chiba Prefecture.

From 2012 until 2021, the district was represented by LDP-member Takaki Shirasuka. Shirasuka left the party after it was revealed he visited a hostess club in Tokyo after a state of emergency had been declared due to the Covid-19 pandemic.

== Areas covered ==
=== Since 2022 ===
- Abiko
- Inzai
- Kamagaya
- Shiroi
- Tomisato
- Iba District

=== 2017 - 2022 ===
- Part of Funabashi
- Inzai
- Kamagaya
- Part of Kashiwa
  - Former Shōnan area
- Shiroi
- Tomisato
- Iba District

=== 2013 - 2017 ===
- Part of Funabashi
- Inzai
- Kamagaya
- Part of Kashiwa
  - Former Shōnan area
- Shiroi
- Tomisato
- Iba District

=== 2002 - 2013 ===
- Inzai
- Kamagaya
- Shiroi
- Tomisato
- Part of Higashi-Katsushika District
  - Shōnan area
- Iba District

== List of representatives ==
Election	Representative	Party	Notes
2003	Yukio Jitsukawa	LDP	
2005	Yukio Jitsukawa	LDP	
2009	Yasuhiko Wakai	Democratic	
2012	Takaki Shirasuka	LDP	
2014	Takaki Shirasuka	LDP	
2017	Takaki Shirasuka	LDP	Shirasuka left the LDP because of the scandal.
2017	Takaki Shirasuka	Independent	
2021	Hisashi Matsumoto	LDP	
2024	Hisashi Matsumoto	LDP	
2026	Hisashi Matsumoto	LDP	

== Election results ==
=== 2026 ===
2026
Party	Candidate	Votes	%	±%
LDP	Hisashi Matsumoto (Incumbent)	121,796	53.9	▲10.1
Centrist Reform	Shin Miyakawa	72,234	31.9	▼10.3
Sanseitō	Megu Nakaya (elected in S. Kanto PR block)	32,098	14.2	▲5.3
Registered electors		416,687		
Turnout			55.55	▲1.53
LDP hold				

=== 2024 ===
2024
Party	Candidate	Votes	%	±%
LDP	Hisashi Matsumoto (Incumbent)	96,024	43.77	▼1.30
CDP	Shin Miyakawa (Won PR seat)	92,501	42.16	▲6.33
Sanseitō	Megumi Nakaya	19,582	8.93	New
JCP	Sueto Kashiwazaki	11,287	5.14	N/A
Majority		3,523	1.61	
Registered electors		417,408		
Turnout			54.02	▼0.47
LDP hold				

=== 2021 ===
2021
Party	Candidate	Votes	%	±%
LDP	Hisashi Matsumoto	100,227	45.07	▼0.77
CDP	Shin Miyakawa	79,687	35.83	New
Ishin	Kiyoshi Shimizu	42,473	19.10	New
Majority		20,540	9.24	
Registered electors		416,857		
Turnout			54.49	▲3.70
LDP gain from Independent				

=== 2017 ===
2017
Party	Candidate	Votes	%	±%
LDP	Takaki Shirasuka (Incumbent)	93,081	45.84	▼5.06
CDP	Shin Miyakawa (Won PR seat)	57,431	28.28	New
Kibō no Tō	Tomohiko Mizuno	31,887	15.70	New
JCP	Kazuko Saito	20,679	10.18	▼4.70
Majority		35,650	17.56	
Registered electors		410,959		
Turnout			50.79	▼0.11
LDP hold				

=== 2014 ===
2014
Party	Candidate	Votes	%	±%
LDP	Takaki Shirasuka (Incumbent)	96,294	50.90	▲9.88
Democratic	Yasuhiko Wakai	64,725	34.22	▲6.56
JCP	Katsutoshi Nakagawa	28,147	14.88	▲7.36
Majority		31,569	16.68	
Registered electors		388,076		
Turnout			50.90	▼7.24
LDP hold				

=== 2012 ===
2012
Party	Candidate	Votes	%	±%
LDP	Takaki Shirasuka	75,152	41.02	▲2.11
Democratic	Yasuhiko Wakai (Incumbent) (Won PR seat)	50,666	27.66	▼29.36
Restoration	Tamotsu Shiiki (Won PR seat)	40,471	22.09	New
JCP	Tomoyuki Satake	13,769	7.52	N/A
Happiness Realization	Yuzo Furukawa	3,134	1.71	▼0.36
Majority		24,486	13.36	
Registered electors		329,571		
Turnout			58.14	▼7.92
LDP gain from Democratic				

=== 2009 ===
2009
Party	Candidate	Votes	%	±%
Democratic	Yasuhiko Wakai	118,062	57.02	▲18.42
LDP	Yukio Jitsukawa (Incumbent)	80,573	38.91	▼15.50
Happiness Realization	Hiroaki Ishii	4,293	2.07	New
Independent	Kenzo Tachibana	4,127	2.00	New
Majority		37,489	18.11	
Registered electors		321,969		
Turnout			66.06	▲0.35
Democratic gain from LDP				

=== 2005 ===
2005
Party	Candidate	Votes	%	±%
LDP	Yukio Jitsukawa (Incumbent)	106,994	54.41	▲6.11
Democratic	Yasuhiko Wakai	75,909	38.60	▼6.33
JCP	Choei Ino	13,756	6.99	▲0.22
Majority		31,085	15.81	
Registered electors		305,244		
Turnout			65.71	▲7.64
LDP hold				

=== 2003 ===
2003
Party	Candidate	Votes	%	±%
LDP	Yukio Jitsukawa	81,625	48.30	New
Democratic	Yasuhiko Wakai (Won PR seat)	75,927	44.93	New
JCP	Choei Ino	11,435	6.77	New
Majority		5,698	3.37	
Registered electors		299,034		
Turnout			58.07	
LDP win (new seat)				
