= Sanrizuka Struggle =

Japanese civil conflict over the construction of Narita Airport (1966-present)

- Part of the History of Japan
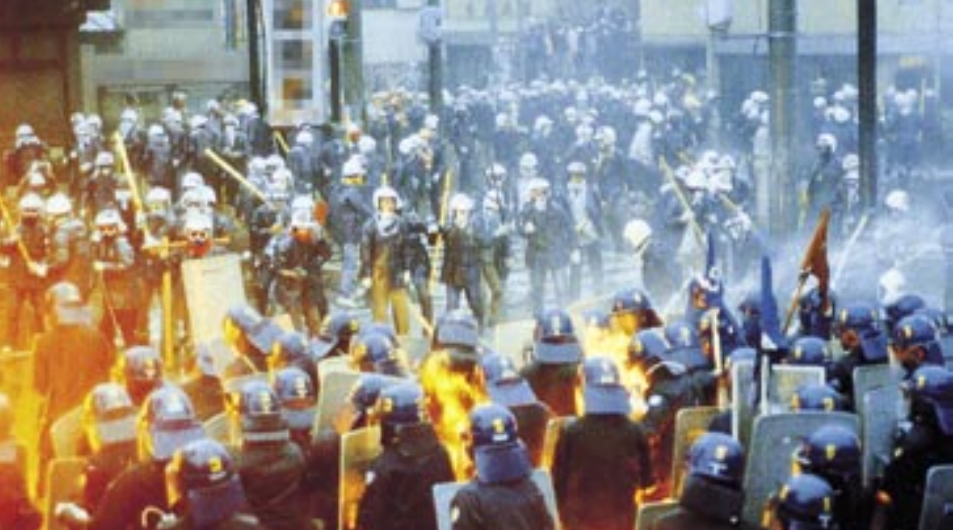
- Clashes between riot police and opposition groups, 20 October 1985
- Date: 22 June 1966 – present
- Location: Chiba Prefecture, Japan
- Caused by: Japanese government construction of Narita Airport without local consent
- Methods: Sit-ins, demonstrations, occupations, bombings
- Status: Ongoing

Parties
Sanrizuka-Shibayama United Opposition League against Construction of the Narita Airport (supported by Communist and Socialist parties)	All-Japan Federation of Student Self-Government Associations	Government of Japan (led by the Liberal Democratic Party)

The Sanrizuka Struggle (Note: Japanese: 三里塚闘争, Hepburn: Sanrizuka tōsō) is a series of civil conflicts and riots involving the Japanese government and the agricultural community of Sanrizuka, comprising organised opposition by farmers, local residents, and leftist groups to the construction of Narita International Airport (then New Tokyo International Airport). The struggle stemmed from the government's decision to construct the airport in Sanrizuka without the involvement or consent of most area residents.

The struggle was led by the Sanrizuka-Shibayama United Opposition League against Construction of the Narita Airport (Note: 三里塚芝山連合空港反対同盟, Sanrizuka-Shibayama Rengo Kūkō Hantai Dōmei) which locals formed under the leadership of opposition parties the Communist Party and Socialist Party. The struggle resulted in significant delays in the opening of the airport, as well as deaths on both sides.

At its height, the union mobilised 17,500 people for a general rally, while thousands of riot police were brought in on several occasions.

== Regional history ==
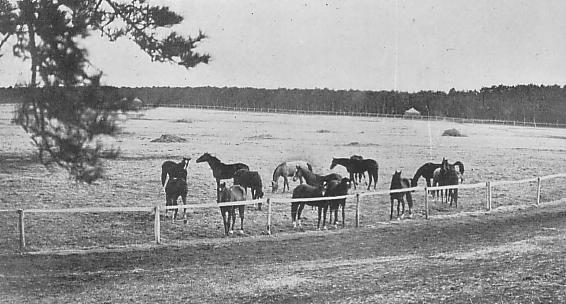
Horses at Goryō Farm in 1930

The northern region of Chiba Prefecture had been farmland since c. 700, when the emperor ordered the creation of horse and cattle pastures there. The Shimōsa Plateau, which covers most of the northern part of the prefecture, had been active in agriculture for centuries. Villages conducting agricultural work in the region since the Edo period were called koson (lit. 'old village'). Edo imperial magistrates' jurisdiction did not reach these villages, which is said to have fostered defiance of political authority as a feature of the region. Farmers' movements, unions, and strikes thrived here above anywhere else in the prefecture.

In the early 20th century, the area became the Imperial family's farmlands, known as Goryō Farm. (Note: 御料牧場, goryou bokujō) Locals became familiar with the Imperial family, who frequently came to visit their stables. The Goryō Farm was emotionally and economically indispensable to locals, with some residents saying this contributed to local opposition to the airport: "Hearing that the Goryō Farm would disappear [as a result of the construction] made everyone around here go crazy."

In 1923, 2,000 hectares (20 km^{2}; 7.7 sq mi) of the Goryō Farm were sold, leading to the development of small villages throughout the Meiji and Taishō periods. This land was cultivated by former lower-class samurai, servants of samurai families, and others who lost their livelihoods to the Meiji Restoration. Many could not cope with the hardships of land-clearing work and abandoned the area. The farmers who remained later won a long judicial struggle to secure their own rights to the land from wealthy Tokyo merchants who held land-bonds.

In 1946, after the Japanese defeat in WWII, large tracts of imperial-owned land were again sold off. The various disadvantaged peoples who settled this land were collectively called "the new poor". (Note: 新窮民, shin-kyuumin) They performed heavy agricultural labour day and night, living in straw huts without electricity or running water. Settlers who could not endure this harsh environment left; those who remained were able to make a living off of land purchased from deserters.

Because of these histories, this region's farmers had a very strong attachment to their lands.

== Origins of the struggle ==
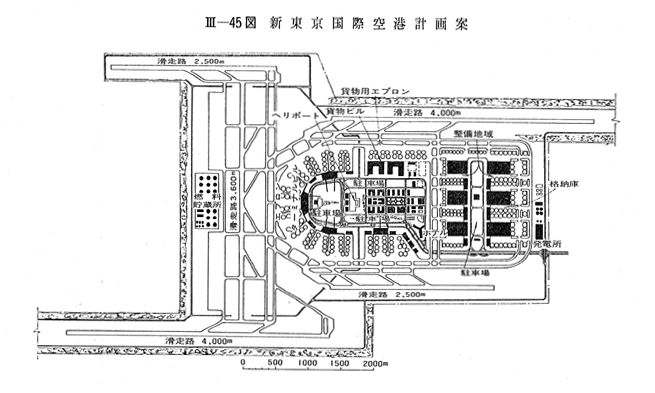
Blueprint for the New Tokyo International Airport (1964)

=== Aviation demand and plans for a new airport ===
In the 1960s, Japanese aviation demands were dramatically increasing with the nation's rapid economic growth. It was predicted that Tokyo International Airport (Haneda Airport) would reach capacity by 1970. For many logistical reasons, expanding Haneda was not an option. Instead, the Ikeda cabinet began planning a second international airport, making a formal cabinet decision on 16 November 1962.

In June 1963, the Ministry of Transport drew up plans for the "New Tokyo International Airport" which envisioned an airport spanning about 2,300 hectares (23 km^{2}; 8.9 sq mi). Areas considered for the site included Tomisato, Yachimata, and several other villages in Chiba Prefecture and Ibaraki Prefecture. In December 1963, the Aviation Council report to Minister of Transport Kentarō Ayabe recommended the Tomisato area, making no reference to the issue of land acquisition.

On 18 November 1965, Eisaku Satō's cabinet made an informal tentative decision to construct the airport in Tomisato, which Chief Cabinet Secretary Tomisaburō Hashimoto unexpectedly announced at a press conference. The planned airport's area equaled half of Tomisato, and its construction would mean the disappearance of many farming villages. Additionally, because aircraft usage at the time was not yet common among the general public, people considered airports to be disruptions that burdened their surrounding environments with noise pollution and other issues. Opposition movements had already risen in each of the potential construction sites, such as the Tomisato-Yachimata Anti-Airport Union formed in 1963. Local farmers expressed outrage at the one-sided nature of the decision and allied with opposition parties (Japanese Communist Party and Japan Socialist Party). There was also resistance by local public bodies who had not been informed of the developments, leading to temporary suspension of the cabinet decision.

=== Reassignment to the Sanrizuka site ===
In 1966, the opposition movement showed no signs of waning. Fearing that the airport construction would be forced to a standstill, the Satō cabinet negotiated secretly with transport vice minister Tokuji Wakasa, Chiba Prefectural Governor Taketo Tomonō, and Liberal Democratic Party (LDP) Vice-President Shōjirō Kawashima. They decided to reassign the construction site 4 kilometres (2.4 mi) north-east, to state-owned land on Goryō Farm, to minimise private land acquisition. They also expected that with Sanrizuka's impoverished farming communities, construction would be possible so long as adequate compensation was provided. However, the Ministry of Transport considered the Tomisato plan ideal and the Sanrizuka plan a fallback. On 21 June 1966, after the switch to the Sanrizuka plan had already been agreed between the government and the prefecture, Transport Minister Torata Nakamura told a press conference, "There is nowhere for the airport but Tomisato/Yachimata."

The following day, Prime Minister Satō held a broadcast conference with Governor Tomonō regarding the Sanrizuka plan. This time the decision had been made after co-ordination with prefectural officials, but without consulting locals. Consequently, Sanrizuka and Shibayama residents were shocked to learn of the decision from the broadcast, and furious opposition broke out as it had in Tomisato. Tomisato organisers hurried to Sanrizuka to encourage frustrated residents that resistance was possible.

On 4 July, the Satō cabinet, wishing to hurry the opening of the airport, made another cabinet decision for the new airport construction. This plan also required a vast expanse of land of which Goryō farmland constituted less than 40%, again making the acquisition of citizen-owned land a major issue.

According to the Transport Minister's instructions in December 1966, the goal was to build the airport in two phases and begin operating the first half by spring 1971, with the remainder to be completed by the end of 1973.

== Organisation of opposition ==
=== Formation of the anti-airport union ===
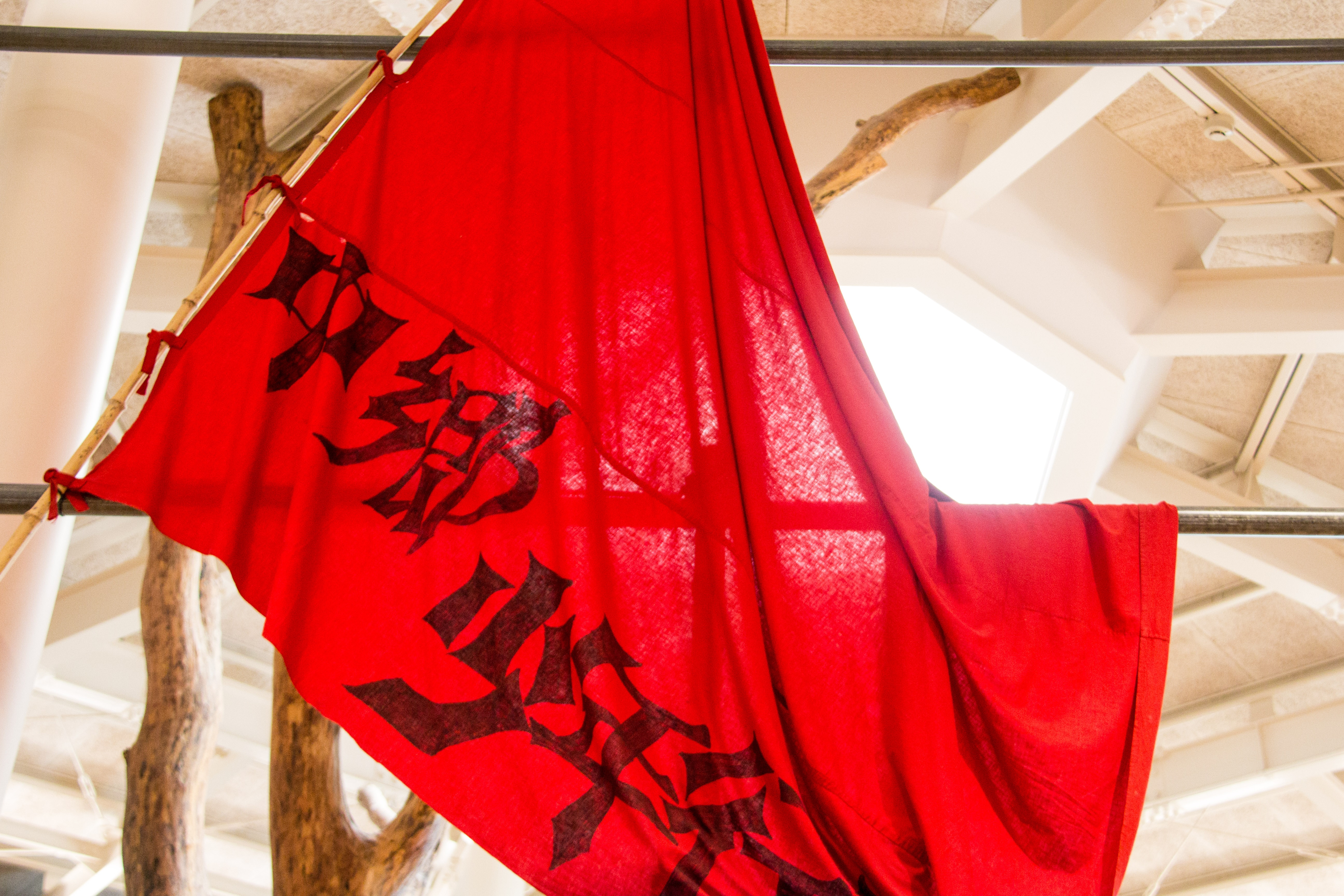
Official symbol of the Sanrizuka-Shibayama United Opposition League against Construction of the Narita Airport (top). Flag of the union's youth division (bottom).

There was nearly unanimous opposition in the region to the cabinet decision. In July or August 1966, the Sanrizuka-Shibayama Joint Anti-Airport Union was formed.

The government was eventually able to secure land from many residents who conceded for social or financial reasons. To acquire the rest, the government employed both hard and soft measures, but the opposition persisted. Beginning in August 1966, the union led a campaign to purchase single plots of land within the designated construction site.

Also that month, Governor Tomonō communicated intent to have on-site investigations performed on the construction site. The opposition responded with demonstrations, sit-ins, and petitions, none of which succeeded. Many appeals were made to LDP leaders, who had a wide following among the opposition, but they persisted in support of the airport.

Early on 10 October, airport corporation members protected by approximately 1,500 riot police arrived to install surveying piles. The opposition attempted to block the road with a sit-in, but they were violently removed by riot police. The airport corporation set up three pile drivers on-site, and afterwards called this a breakthrough toward the construction.

=== Involvement of other political groups ===
In 1967, the Japanese student movement was on the rise, and the union hoped to cooperate with students who had clashed with riot police in protests against the US–Japan Security Treaty, taking the stance that they would "accept support without regard for political faction". Supported by various left-wing groups, the union held sit-ins, seized and destroyed surveying equipment from airport corporation employees, erected barricades, threw stones, and harassed airport affiliates. They were generally successful in mobilising armed struggle against the government. However, antagonism developed between parties, creating differing perceptions among union members of their relationship to leftist parties and eventually leading to splits.

== Intensification of the struggle ==
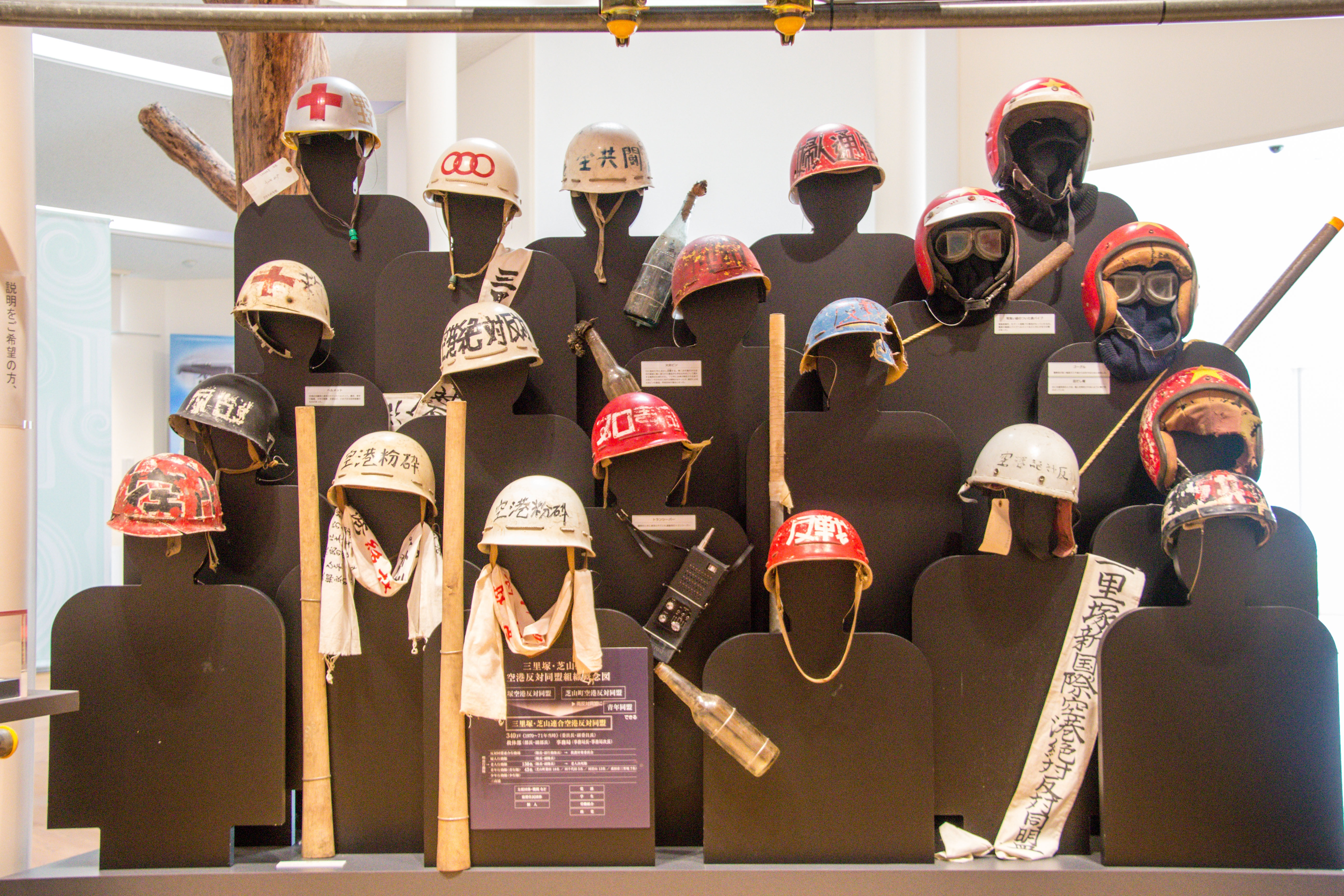
Anti-airport protesters' equipment and weapons

From April to July 1968, the airport corporation ran a survey of the real estate of residents who had agreed to give up their land. Both leftist parties and farmers had opposed with physical resistance, resulting in damage to many houses and fields.

On 18 August 1969, the Goryō Farm's closing ceremony was held. The union attended in protest, and the youth division destroyed the assembly hall, putting their leader on the police's nationwide wanted list. The police became tougher on the opposition, arresting union leader Issaku Tomura and thirteen others in November 1969 for occupying a road and stopping a bulldozer.

With these struggles, peaceful acquisition of land was thought impossible, and the airport corporation used state power to forcibly expropriate the remaining necessary land. In 1970, it carried out an on-site survey on yet-unpurchased land. Opposition members threw raw sewage, chloropicrin, and stones, and fought with sickles and bamboo spears. They also constructed fortifications on the land, some of them underground. On 22 February 1971, the government enacted the first administrative subrogation and the opposition supporters clashed with construction workers and riot police. The forts were demolished.

On 16 September 1971, the second subrogation was enacted. Three police officers were killed by rioters on this day (Tōhō Cross Road incident). Four days later, riot police and construction workers arrived on-site to remove an elderly woman, Yone Koizumi, and demolish her house. This incident was held as an example of the state throwing lives into turmoil, and became a symbol for the continuing opposition struggle.

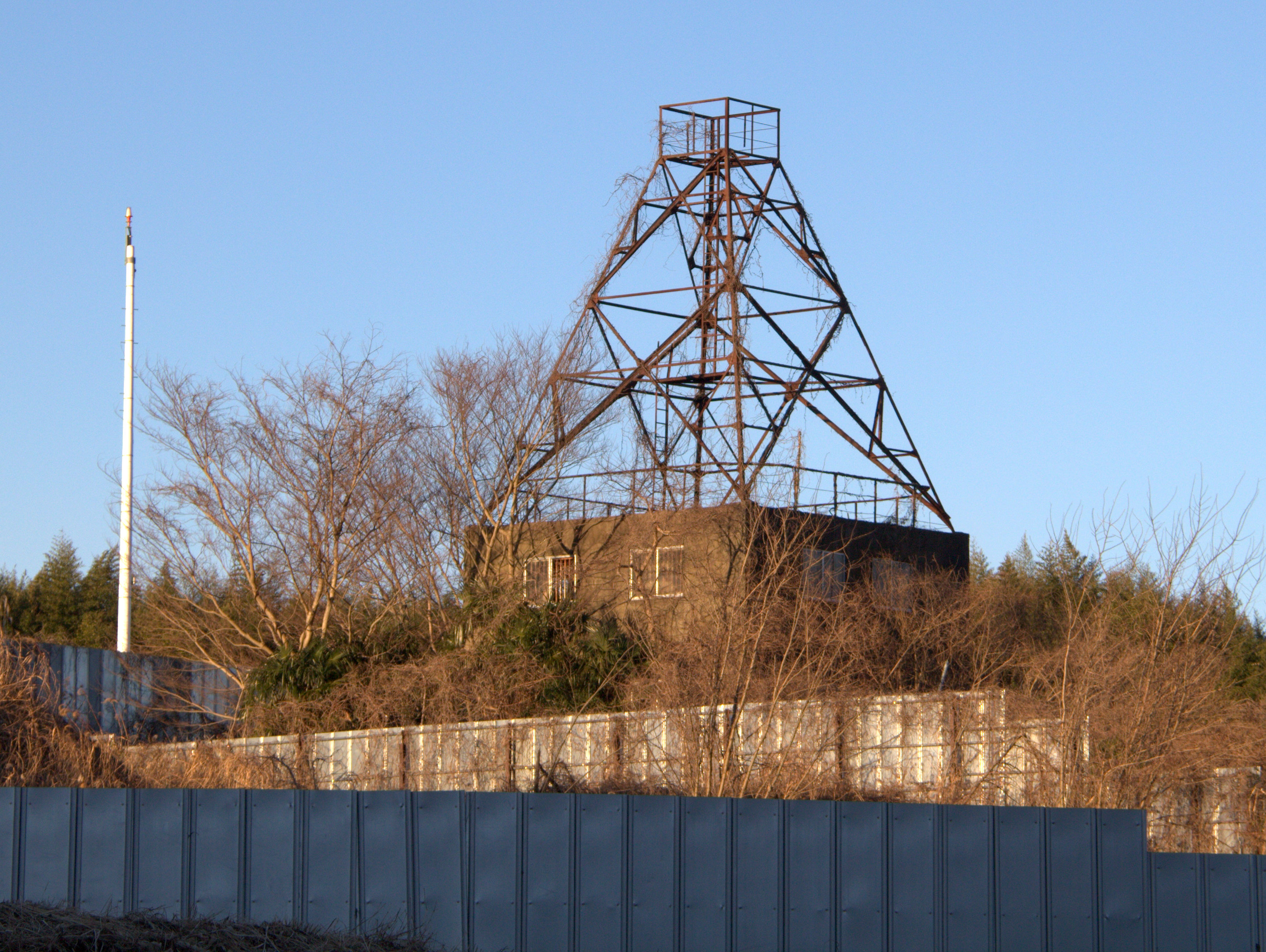
The tower built on the construction site by opposition members

On 1 October 1971, Fumio Sannomiya, a central member of the youth division, committed suicide, leaving a note that said, "I detest those who brought the airport to this land" and "I have lost the will to keep fighting." Additional conflicts in 1971 led to the deaths of three riot police, with multiple injuries on both sides.

In March 1972, the union constructed a 60.6-metre (200 ft) tower within Runway A's approach area, obstructing flight tests. Opposition activity also halted the construction of a jet fuel pipeline from the Port of Chiba. Facility construction was able to proceed, but the opening continued to be delayed. The opposition union had also received a blow from mass arrests at the anti-subrogation struggle, with its initial membership of 320 households falling to 45, then to 23 by 1976.

Footage of the incidents appeared in the film Days of Fury (1979), directed by Fred Warshofsky and hosted by Vincent Price.

== Opening of the airport ==
In January 1977, the Fukuda cabinet proclaimed that the airport would open within the year. On 17 April the opposition mobilised 17,500 people — an all-time record for the struggle — and held a general rally against the airport in a Sanrizuka public park.

In May 1977, the airport corporation submitted an injunction request for the demolition of the tower to the prefectural court, which was accepted. On 6 May, 2,100 riot police gained control of the tower and surrounding area. Protesters were removed and the tower demolished. Clashes between opposition and riot police continued, and on 8 May a large-scale conflict broke out. One protester sustained a direct blow to the head from a tear gas bomb, lost consciousness, and died two days later. The deceased's parents sued the government and prefecture for ¥94 million in damages. On 9 May, in an attack considered revenge for this incident, one police officer died.

Meanwhile, first-phase construction continued, and the airport was scheduled to open for operation with one runway on 30 March 1978. However, on 26 March, several left-wing groups raided the airport, occupying a control tower and destroying equipment and facilities. Further delays became inevitable, and the government enacted new disciplinary laws while increasing airport security.

On 20 May, two months later, the New Tokyo International Airport was completed despite ongoing opposition. At this time, 17 farming households remained on the unfinished second-phase land, of which 15 belonged to the union. The last of them was evicted in 2023.

== Continued opposition ==
With the opening of the airport, the union's slogan was changed from "Certain Prevention of the Airport" to "Airport Abolition / Stop Second Phase Construction". Issaku Tomura, the leader and psychological pillar of the union, soon died of illness, and combined with the reality of the airport's success, this led many union participants to withdraw. Over time, the union's previous supporters – leftist and student groups – came to take charge.

Authorities thought it impossible to protect the airport from militant attacks while also acquiring the second-phase land, leading to behind-the-scenes negotiations between government and union members. However, negotiations failed after being leaked to the media, resulting in harassment of union leaders and the union dissolving into chaos. Destructive action against the airport continued from splinter groups, with over 511 incidents of guerrilla action recorded between 1978 and 2017.

== Gallery ==
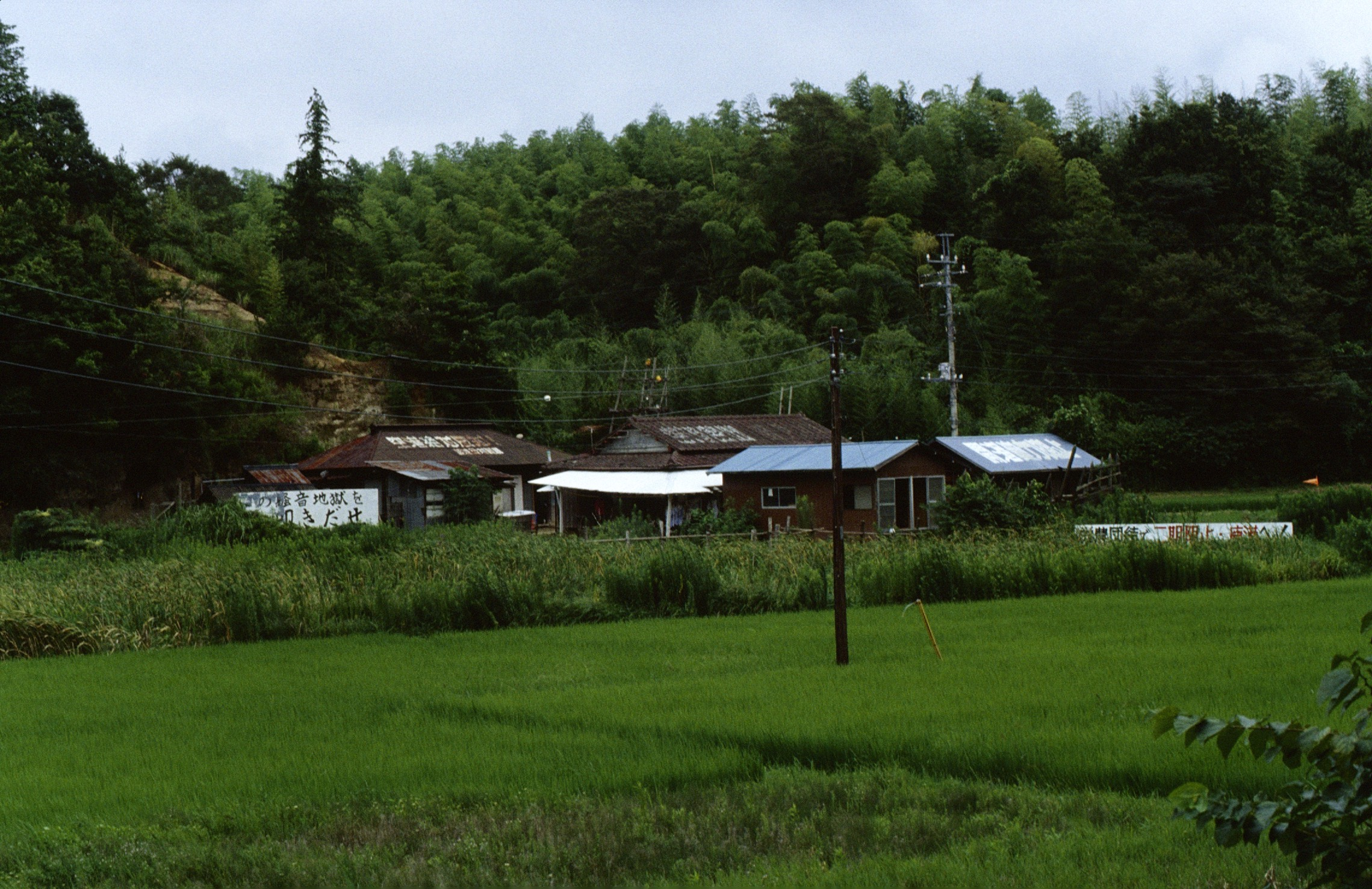
A protesting farmer, 1982

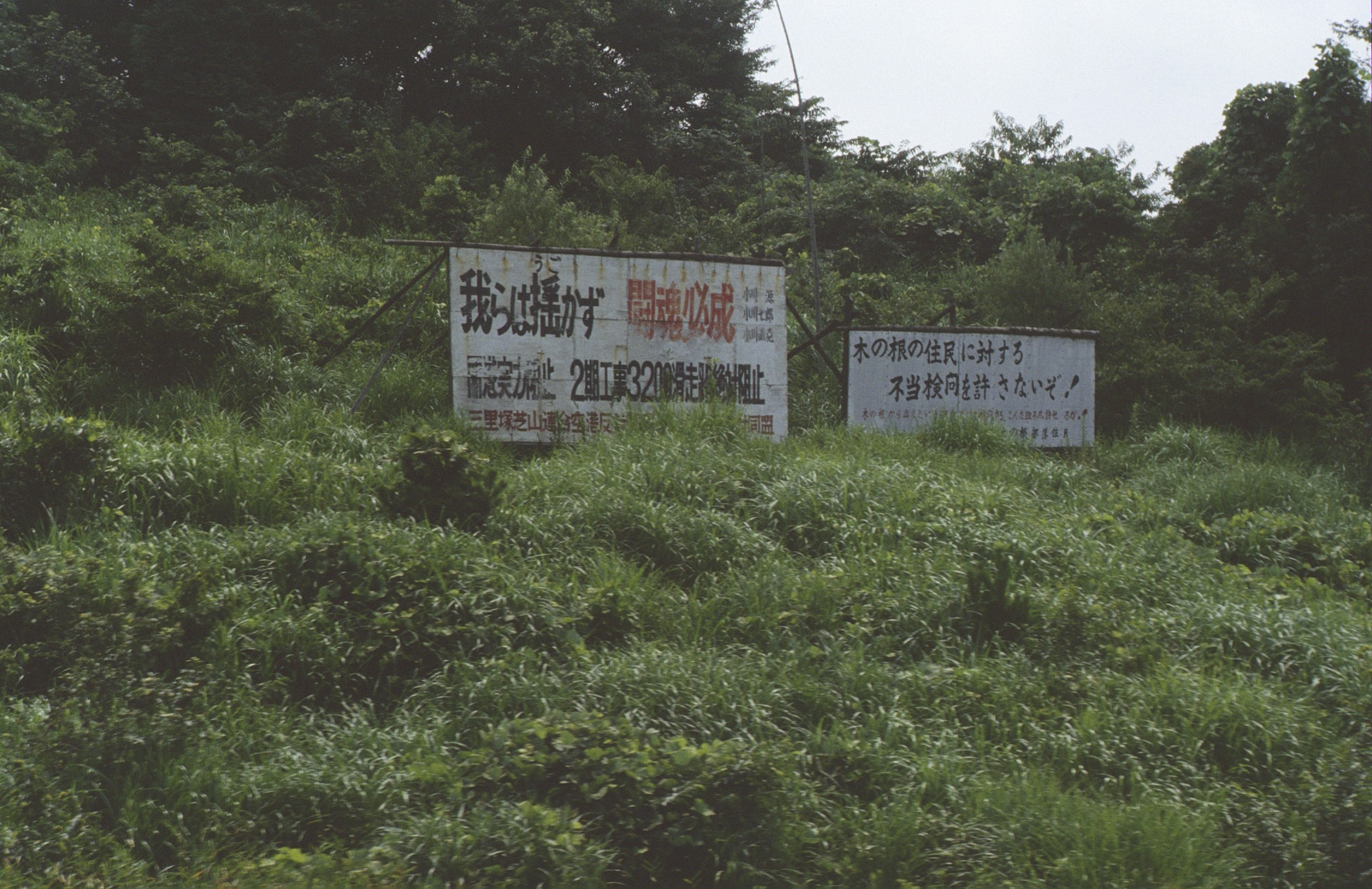
The anti-airport slogan, "Definitely block the second phase of construction of runway 3200", 1982

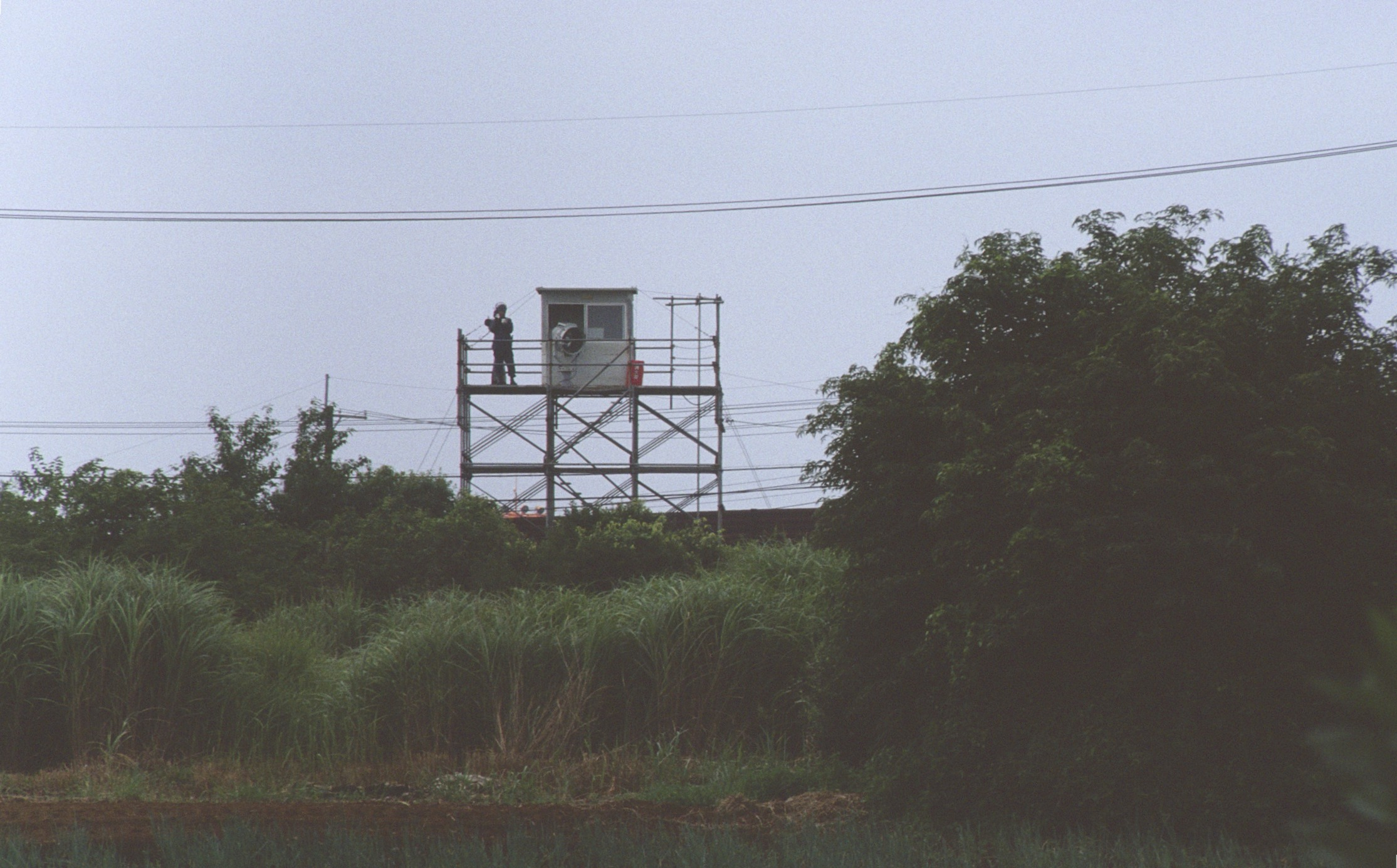
A police officer of the Riot Police Unit surveils the anti-airport riots, 1982

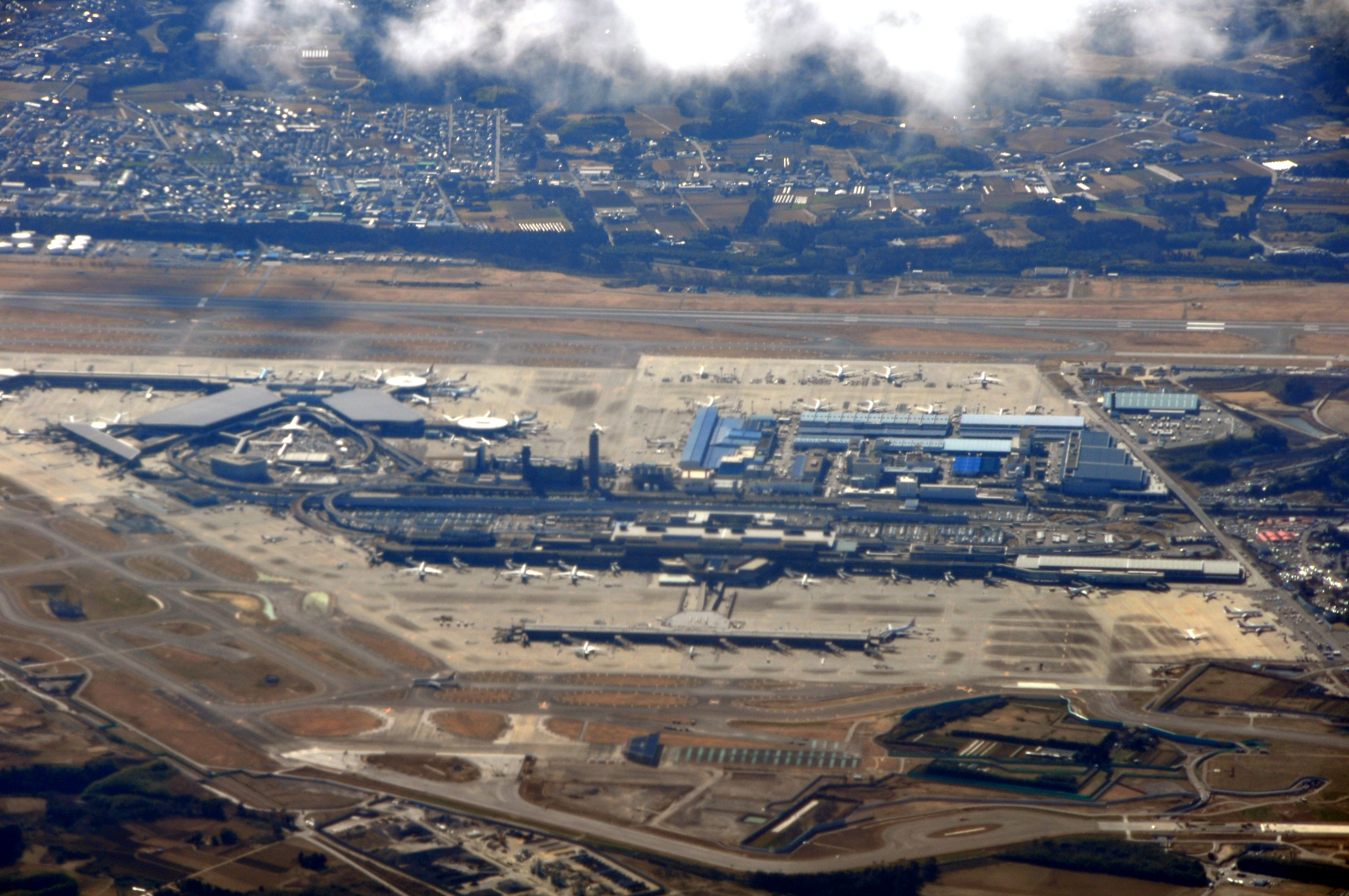
A site not purchased of the second construction area, 2009

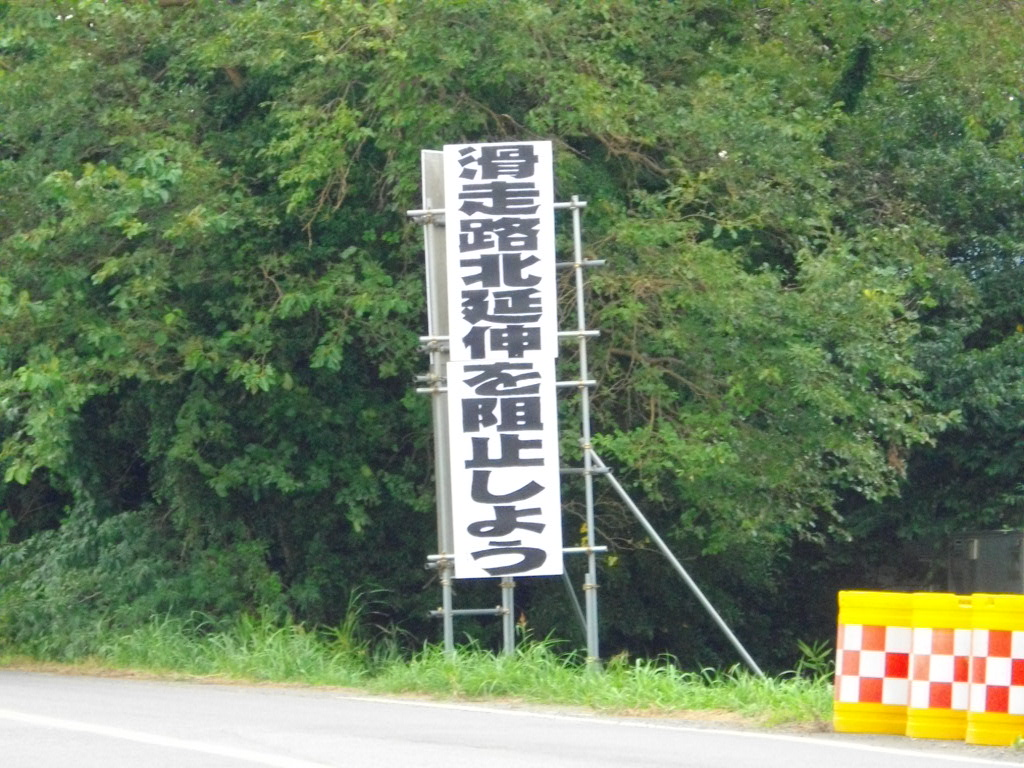
The anti-airport slogan, "Block the extended runway to the north", 2009

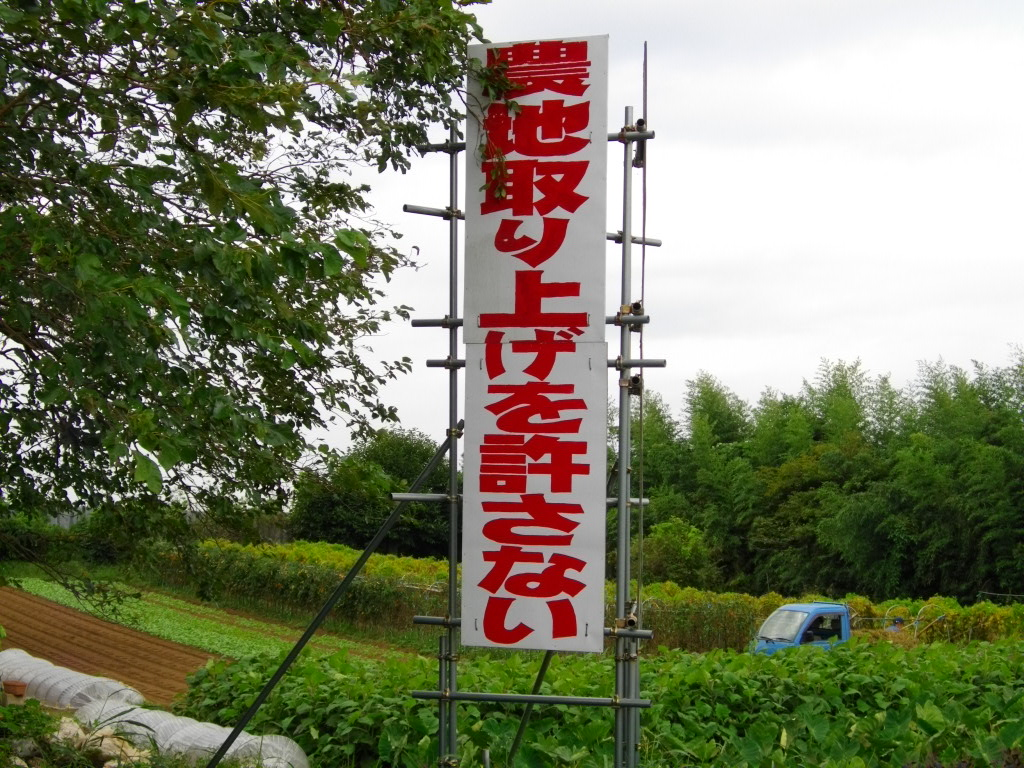
The anti-airport slogan, "We won't allow the acquisition of farmland", 2009

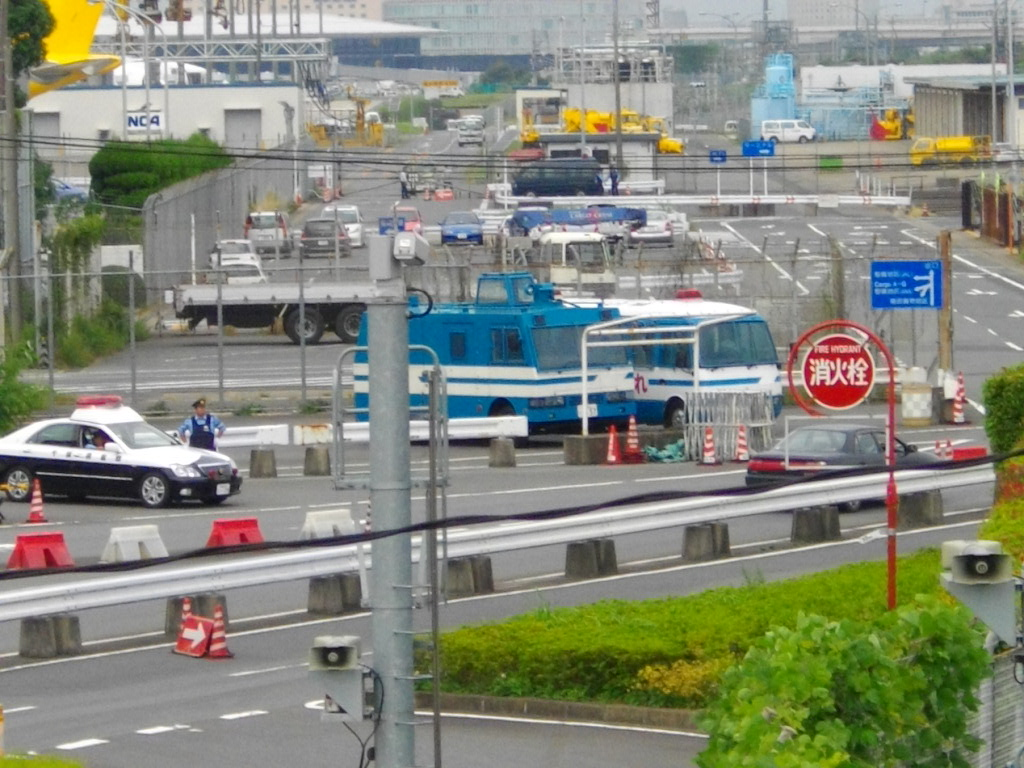
A police unit preparing to handle intruders near the airport entrance, 2009

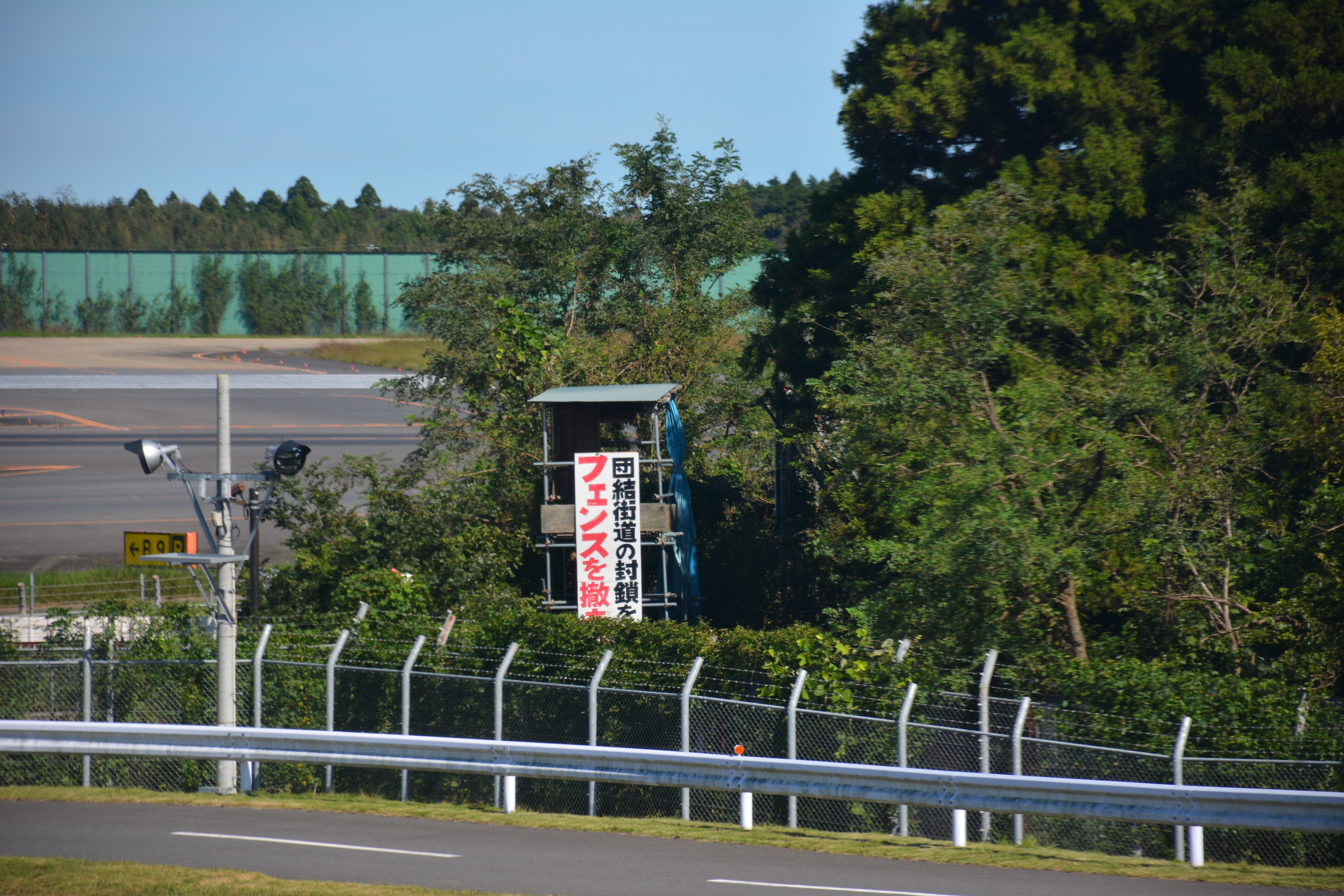
The anti-airport slogan, "Stop locking the Danketu (unity) road! Remove the fence!", 2009

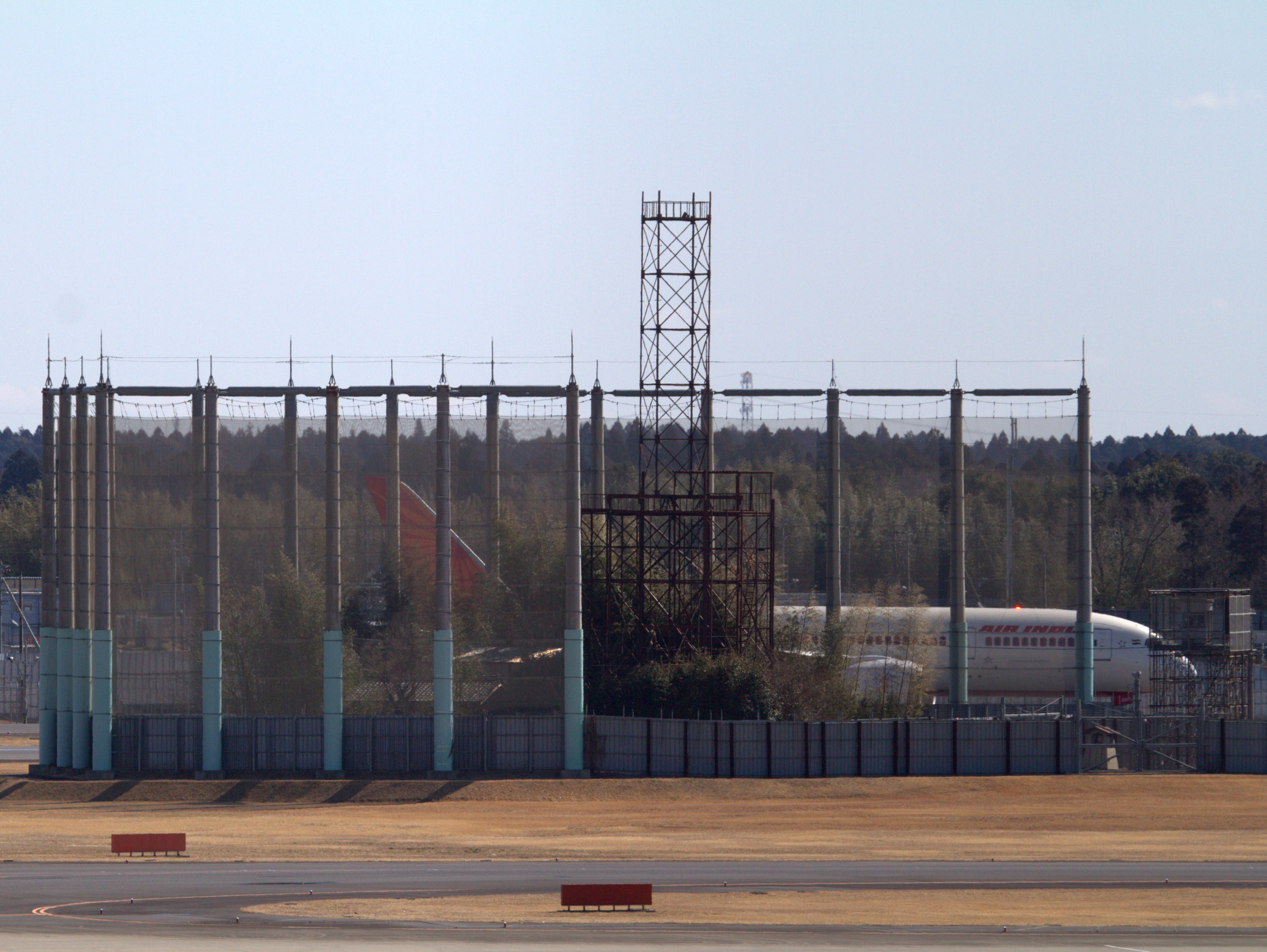
Yokobori steel tower, 2017

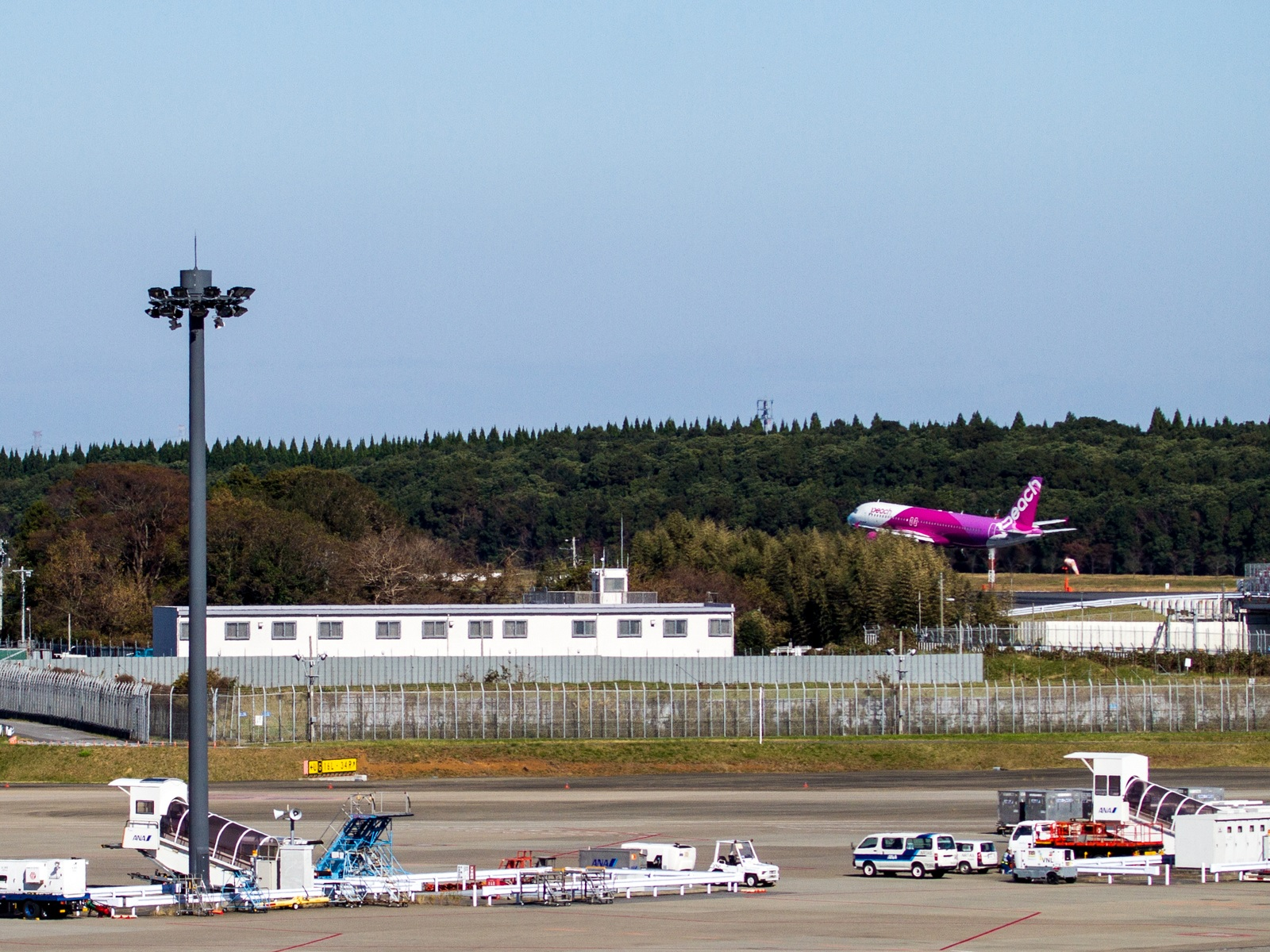
Unpurchased area of Tōhō and Tenjinmine district, 2019. The white building is a police facility.

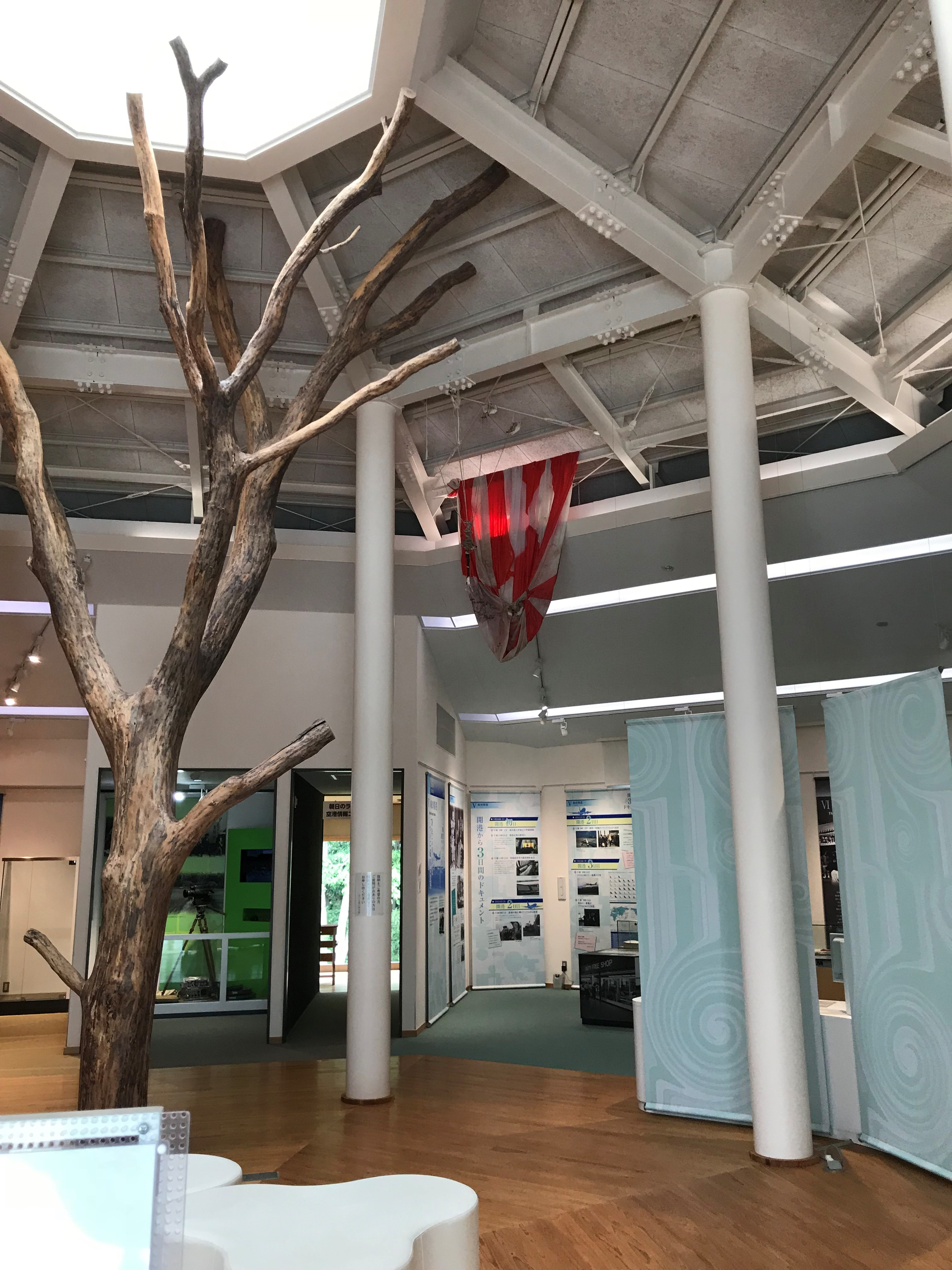
Balloon utilised by the anti-airport union to disturb aircraft (displayed at Narita Airport and Community Historical Museum)

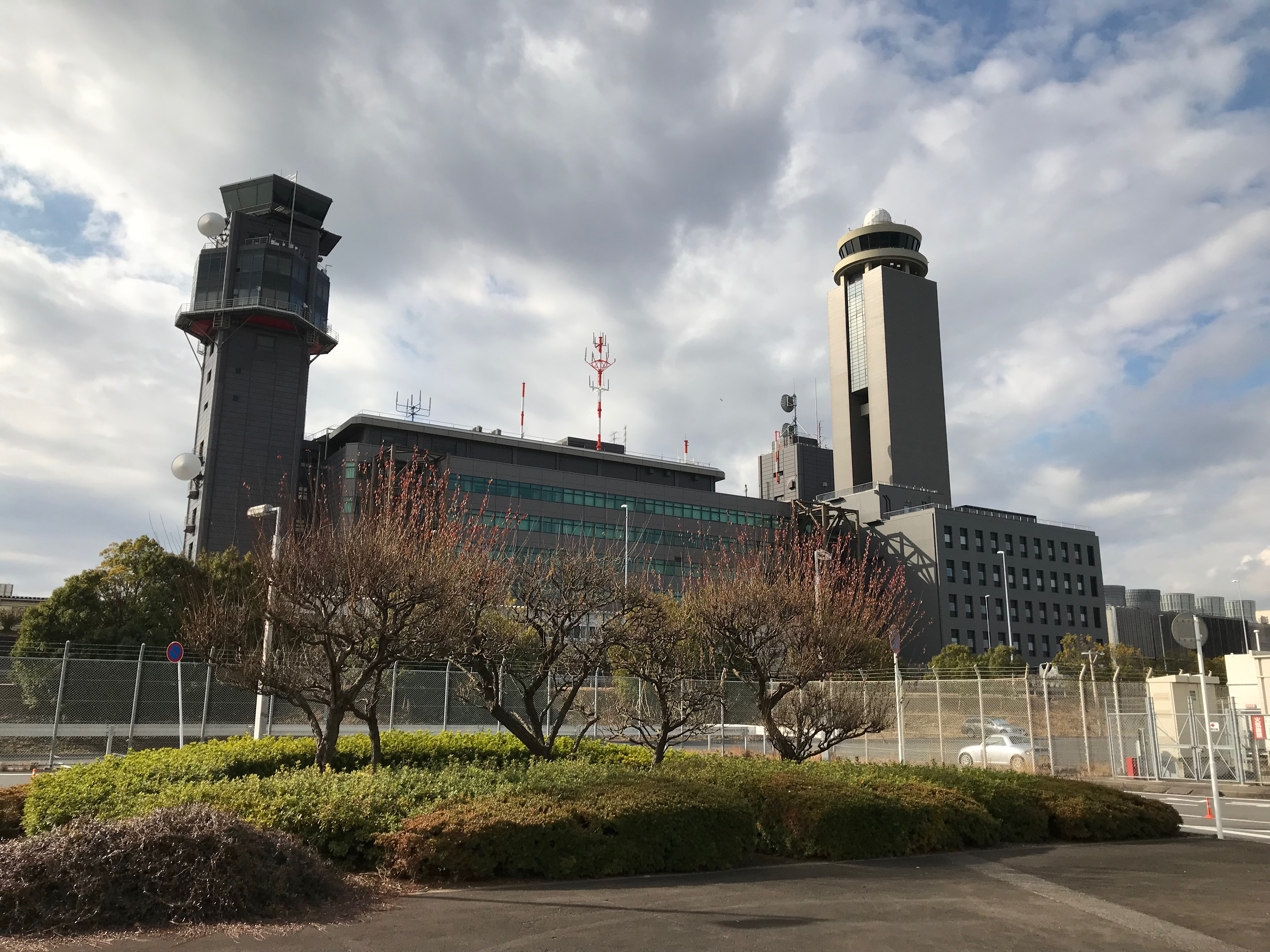
Transplanted plum trees and former ATC tower (left)

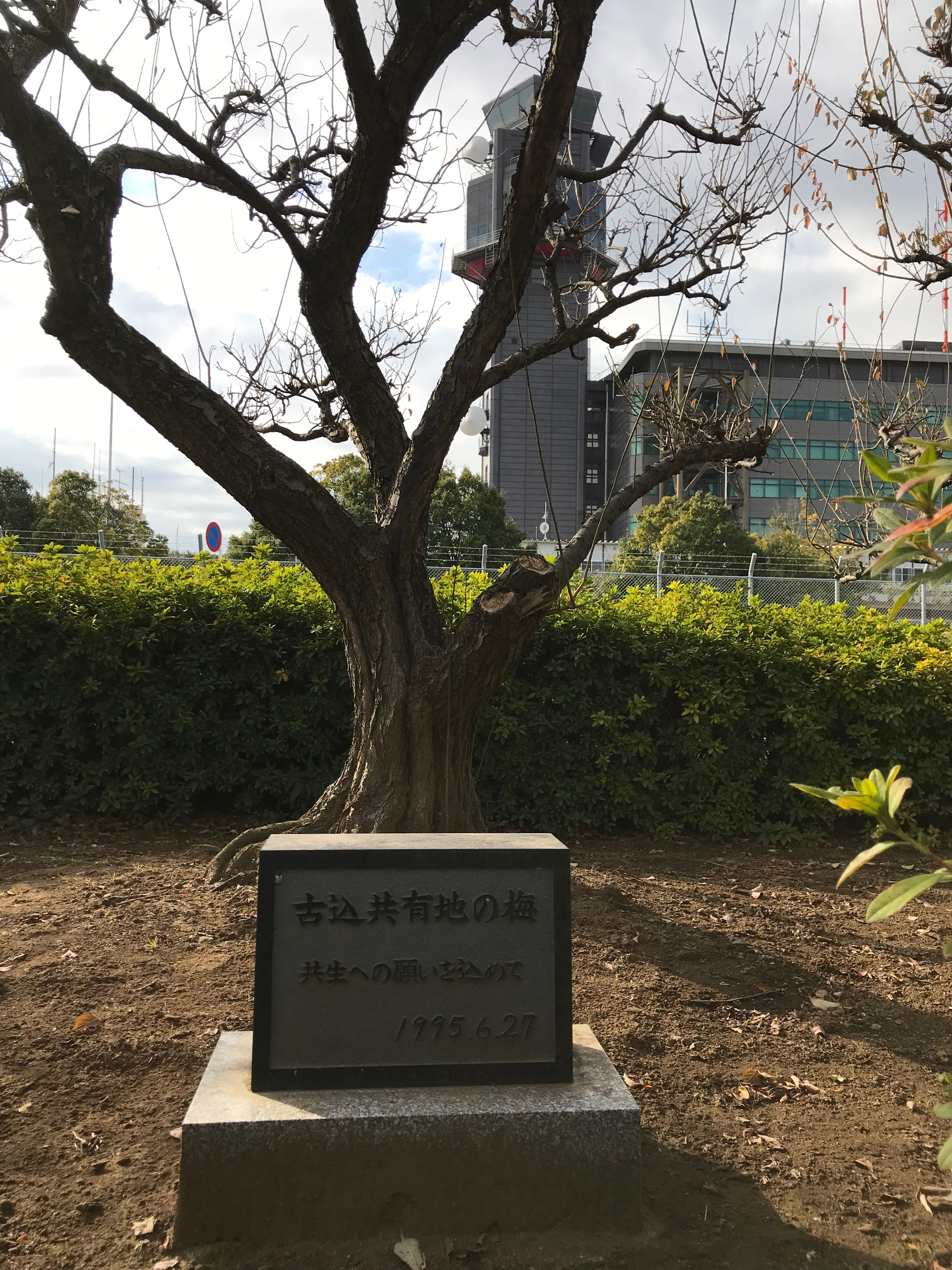
Plum tree monument with wishes for coexistence in Furugome common land, erected on June 27, 1995.

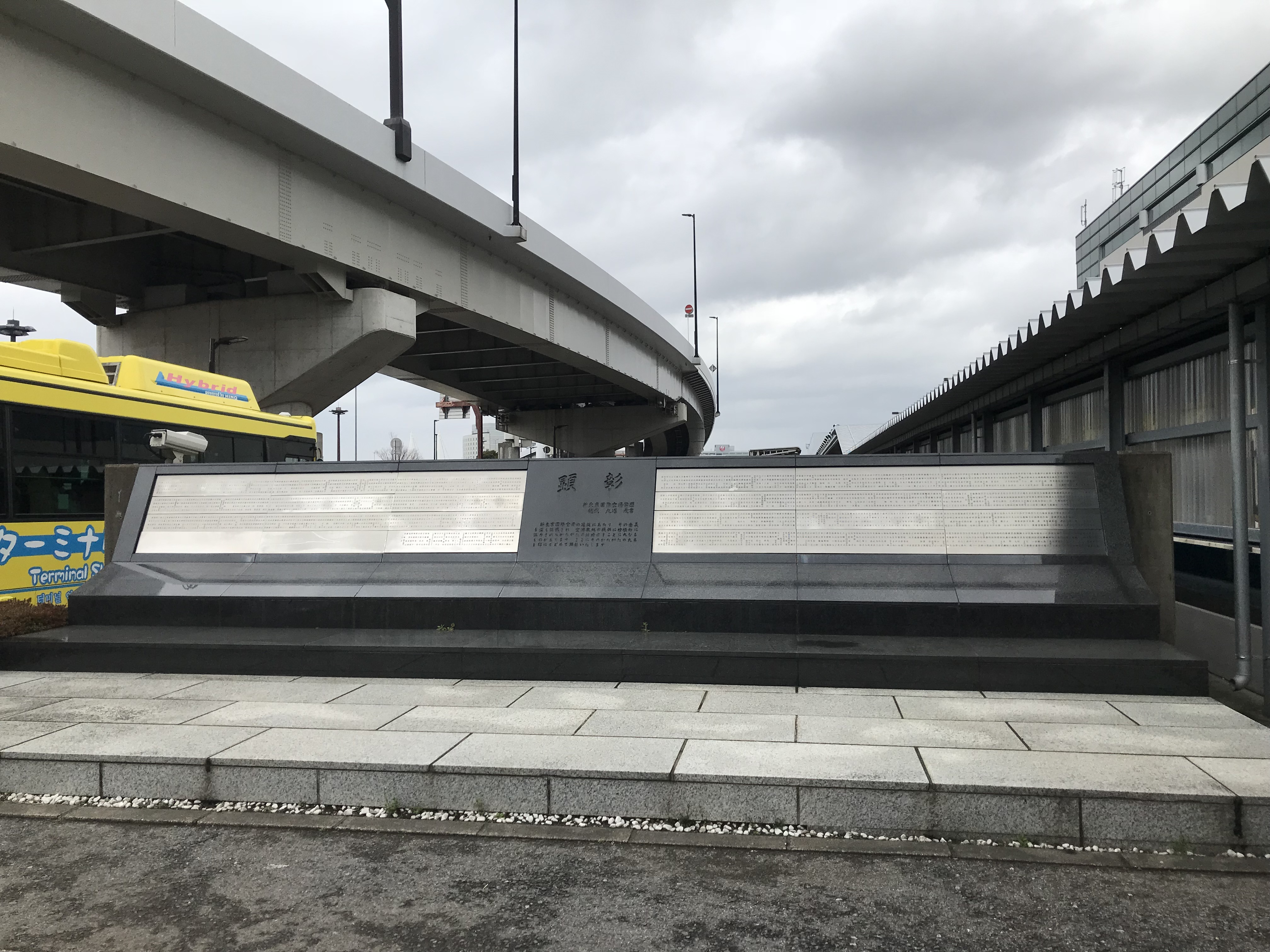
The honoring monument of land provider for construction located in the airport

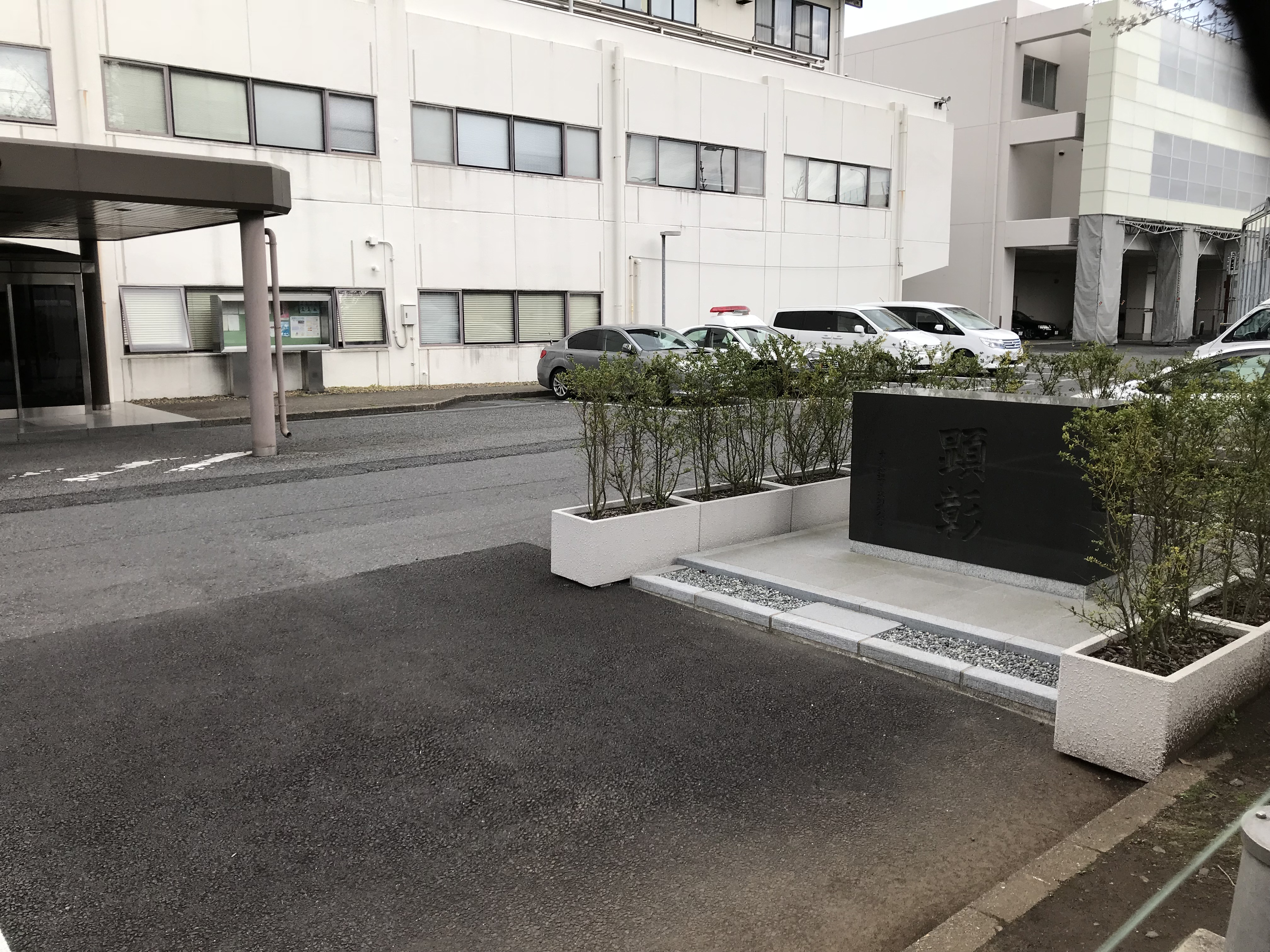
The monument honoring a police officer who died policing the Narita Airport

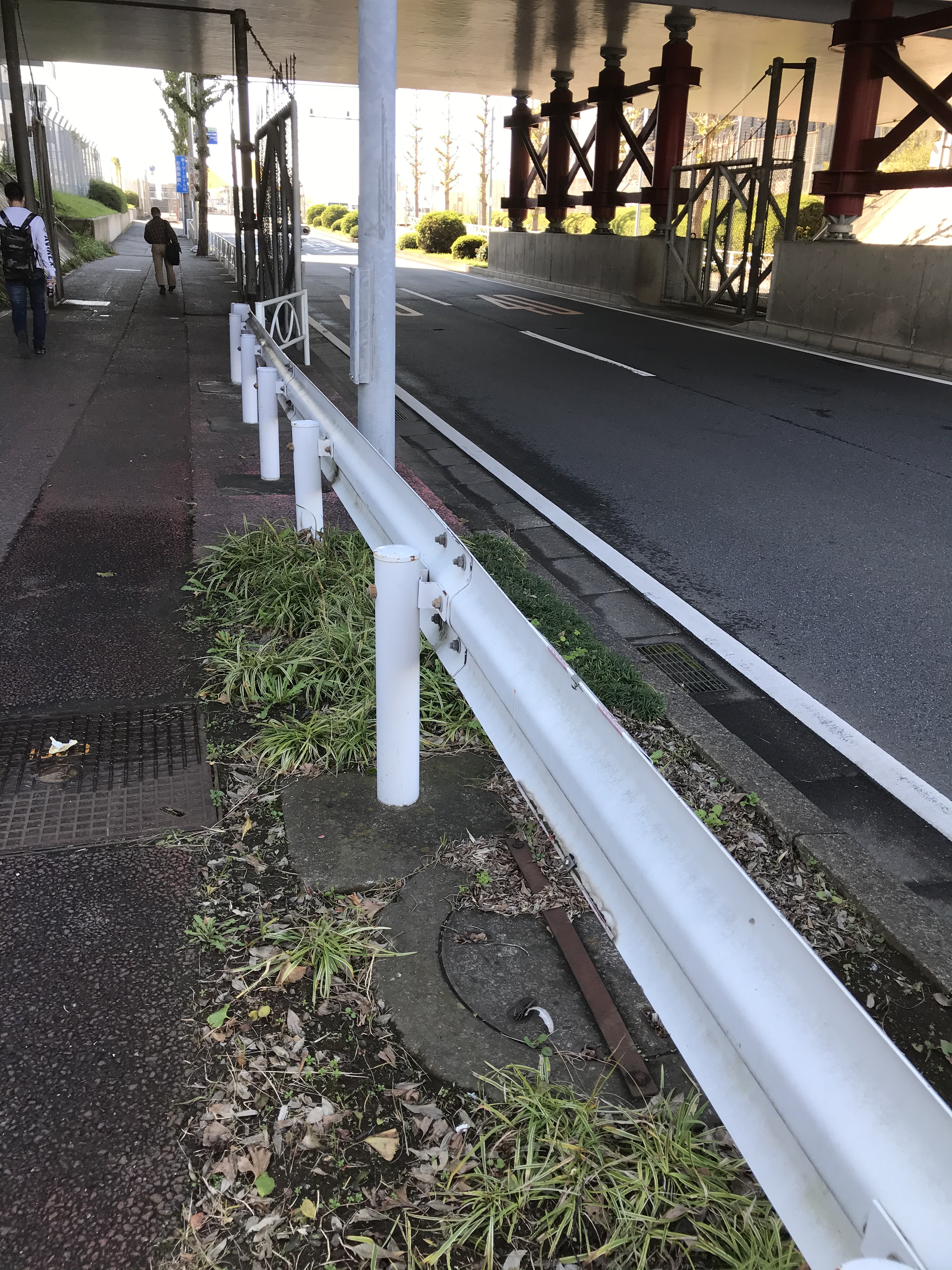
A manhole near the Narita Airport sealed to prevent extremists

== Support organizations ==
- Revolutionary Communist League, National Committee
- Japan Revolutionary Communist League
- National Railway Chiba Motive Power Union

== See also ==
- Sunagawa Struggle
