= List of international presidential trips made by Iván Duque =

This is a list of international presidential trips made by Iván Duque, the 34th president of Colombia. Iván Duque made 46 international trips to 24 countries during his presidency, which began on August 7, 2018 and ended on August 7, 2022.

== Summary ==
The number of visits per country where President Duque traveled are:

- One: Argentina, Bolivia, Brazil, Belgium, China, El Salvador, Guatemala, Italy, Israel, Korea, Paraguay, Spain, United Arab Emirates, Vatican City
- Two: Mexico, Switzerland, United Kingdom
- Three: Chile, Panama, Peru, France
- Four: Ecuador
- Eight: United States

== 2018 ==
	Dates	Country	Locations	Details
1	August 15, 2018	Paraguay	Asunción	Attendance to the inauguration of the President of Paraguay, Mario Abdo Benítez
2	September 10, 2018	Panama	Panama City	Meeting with President Juan Carlos Varela
3	September 23–26, 2018	United States	New York City	Participation in the 73th United Nations General Assembly
4	October 22, 2018	Vatican City	Vatican City	Private audience with His Holiness Pope Francis
4	October 22–23, 2018	Italy	Rome	Meetings with the president, Sergio Mattarella; the Italian prime minister, Giuseppe Conte and the president of the Senate, Maria Elisabetta Alberti.5
4	October 23–24, 2018	Belgium	Brussels	Meetings with the NATO Secretary General, Jens Stoltenberg; Belgian Prime Minister Charles Michel; the President of the European Council, Donald Tusk; the High Representative of the EU for Foreign Policy, Federica Mogherini and the President of the European Commission, Jean-Claude Juncker.
5	November 10–11, 2018	France	Paris	Participation in the commemorative acts of the centenary of the end of the First World War and the Paris Forum for Peace. Meeting with the Secretary General of the OECD, José Ángel Gurría and UNESCO authorities
6	December 1, 2018	Mexico	Mexico City	Attendance to the inauguration of President Andres Manuel Lopez Obrador
7	December 4, 2018	Ecuador	Quito	Meeting with the President of Ecuador, Lenín Moreno, and participation in the VII Binational Cabinet.

== 2019 ==
	Dates	Country	Locations	Details
8	January 22–25, 2019	Switzerland	Davos	Participation in the World Economic Forum.
9	January 27, 2019	Panama	Panama City	Participation in the World Youth Day 2019 and meeting with Pope Francis.
10	February 13, 2019	United States	Washington, D.C.	Meeting with President Donald Trump.
11	March 21–22, 2019	Chile	Santiago	First summit of the Forum for the Progress and Development of Latin America Prosur and meeting with the President of Chile, Sebastián Piñera.
12	March 8–9, 2018	United States	Silicon Valley, Seattle	Meeting with executives from Apple, Google, 500 Startups, Microsoft and Amazon.
13	March 26–27, 2019	Peru	Lima	state visit Participation in the XIX Andean Presidential Council and meeting with the President of Peru, Martín Vizcarra.
14	June 1, 2019	El Salvador	San Salvador	Attendance to the inauguration of President Nayib Bukele.
15	June 10, 2019	Argentina	Buenos Aires	Meeting with the President of Argentina, Mauricio Macri.
16	June 17–18, 2019	United Kingdom	London	Meeting with Prince Charles and the outgoing Prime Minister of the United Kingdom, Theresa May. Participation in the opening of Colombia Inside Out 2019.
16	June 19, 2019	Switzerland	Geneva	Meeting with António Vitorino, director of the IOM, and Guy Ryder, director of the ILO. Intervention before the General Assembly of the International Labour Organization.
16	June 19–20, 2019	France	Paris	Meeting with the President of France, Emmanuel Macron, and with the President of the French National Assembly, Richard Ferrand.
16	June 20, 2019	Switzerland	Bern	Meeting with the President of the Swiss Confederation, Ueli Maurer.
16	June 21, 2019	France	Cannes	Participation in the Cannes Lions International Advertising Festival.
17	July 1, 2019	Panama	Panama City	Attendance to the inauguration of President Laurentino Cortizo
18	July 5–6, 2019	Peru	Lima	Attendance to the XIV Summit of the Pacific Alliance.
19	July 29–31, 2019	China	Shanghai, Beijing	Meeting with the President of the People's Republic of China, Xi Jinping; the Chairman of the People's Congress, Li Zhanshu, and the Prime Minister, Li Keqiang.
20	September 22–28, 2019	United States	New York City	Participation in the 74th United Nations General Assembly

== 2020 ==
	Dates	Country	Locations	Details
21	January 14, 2020	Guatemala	Guatemala City	Inauguration of President Alejandro Giammattei.
22	March 1, 2020	Uruguay	Montevideo	Inauguration of President Luis Lacalle Pou.
22	March 2, 2020	United States	Washington	Meeting with the President of the United States, Donald Trump.
23	March 9, 2020	United States	New York City	Meeting with the Secretary General of the United Nations, António Guterres.
23	March 10, 2020	Mexico	Mexico City	Meeting with the President of Mexico, Andrés Manuel López Obrador.
24	November 8, 2020	Bolivia	La Paz	Inauguration of the president of Bolivia, Luis Arce.
24	November 9, 2020	Chile	Santiago	Meeting with the President of Chile, Sebastián Piñera.
25	December 11, 2020	Chile	Santiago	XV Summit of Presidents of the Pacific Alliance.

== 2021 ==
	Dates	Country	Locations	Details
26	January 14, 2021	Ecuador	San Lorenzo	Meeting with the President of Ecuador, Lenín Moreno.
27	July 28, 2021	Peru	Lima	Possession of the president of Peru, Pedro Castillo.
28	August 24–26, 2021	South Korea	Seoul	Meeting with the President of South Korea, Moon Jae-in.
29	September 15–18, 2021	Spain	Madrid, Santiago de Compostela	Meetings with the King, Felipe VI, the President of the Government, Pedro Sánchez and the President of the Galician Regional Government, Alberto Núñez Feijóo.
29	September 19–23, 2021	United States	New York City	Participation in the 75th General Assembly of the United Nations.
30	October 11–12, 2021	United States	Washington, D.C., New York City	Meetings with the President of the World Bank, David Malpass; the director of the International Monetary Fund, Kristalina Gueorguieva; the President of the Inter-American Development Bank, Mauricio Claver-Carone and the OAS Secretary General, Luis Almagro.
31	October 18–19, 2021	Brazil	Brasília	Meeting with the President of Brazil, Jair Bolsonaro.
32	November 1–2, 2021	United Kingdom	Glasgow	Participation in the United Nations Conference on Climate Change in 2021.
32	November 3, 2021	France	Paris	Meeting with French President Emmanuel Macron.
32	November 4–6, 2021	United Arab Emirates	Dubai	Attendance at the Dubai World Expo 2020.
32	November 7–8, 2021	Israel	Jerusalem	Meeting with the Prime Minister, Naftalí Bennett and the President, Isaac Herzog.
33	November 21, 2021	Ecuador	Quito	Meeting with the President of Ecuador, Guillermo Lasso.

== 2022 ==
	Dates	Country	Locations	Details
34	January 14, 2022	Ecuador	Galapagos Islands	Signing of the decree creating the Galapagos Islands Marine Reserve.
35	February 9–10, 2022	Luxembourg	Luxembourg	Meeting with the Prime Minister of Luxembourg, Xavier Bettel.
35	February 10–13, 2022	France	Paris, Brest	Participation in the special session of the OECD and the World Ocean Summit. Meeting with the Director-General of UNESCO, Audrey Azoulay
35	February 14, 2022	Belgium	Brussels	Meeting with the High Representative of the Union for Foreign Affairs and Security Policy Josep Borrell, the President of the European Commission Ursula von der Leyen, and the Secretary-General of the North Atlantic Treaty Organization NATO Jens Stoltenberg.
35	February 15, 2022	France	Strasbourg	Address at the plenary session of the European Parliament.
35	February 16–17, 2022	Netherlands	Rotterdam and The Hague	Meeting with Prime Minister of the Netherlands Mark Rutte and King William. Meeting with the President of the International Criminal Court Piotr Hofmański and Chief Prosecutor Karim Khan.
36	March 6–7, 2022	United States	Houston	Participation in the international CERAWEEK conference.
37	March 10, 2022	United States	Washington	Meeting with President of the United States Joe Biden.
38	April 10–12, 2022	United States	New York City	Meeting with Secretary-General of the United Nations António Guterres and address to the United Nations Security Council.
39	April 29, 2022	Dominican Republic	Santo Domingo	Meeting with President of the Dominican Republic Luis Abinader.
40	May 8, 2022	Costa Rica	San José	Inauguration of President of Costa Rica Rodrigo Chaves.
41	May 10–11, 2022	United States	New York City	Participation in the Inside Out-CIO Economic Forum.
42	May 18–19, 2022	United Kingdom	London	Meeting with Prime Minister of the United Kingdom Boris Johnson and Charles, Prince of Wales.
42	May 20–21, 2022	Turkey	Istanbul	Meeting with President of Turkey Recep Tayyip Erdoğan.
42	May 22–26, 2022	Switzerland	Davos	Participation in the World Economic Forum.
43	June 2–3, 2022	United States	Washington, Reno	Celebration of 200 years of relations with the United States and meeting with Secretary General of the OAS, Luis Almagro Participation in the U.S. National Conference of Mayors.
44	June 7–10, 2022	United States	Los Angeles	Participation in the IX Summit of the Americas.
45	June 14–15, 2022	United States	Washington	Launch of the book 'History of a Special Relationship: Colombia-United States 200 Years' with the presence of US Secretary of State, Antony Blinken.
46	June 26–28, 2022	Portugal	Lisbon	Participation in the Second United Nations Ocean Conference and meeting with the President of Portugal, Marcelo Rebelo de Sousa.
47	July 13, 2022	United States	Miami	Participation in the 2022 Concordia Summit of the Americas.

== Multilateral meetings ==
Multilateral meetings of the following intergovernmental organizations took place during Iván Duque's presidency (2018–2022).

Intergovernmental organizations
Group	Year				
Group	2018	2019	2020	2021	2022
UNGA	September 28 (United States) New York City	September 24–27 (United States) New York City	September 22 (videoconference) (United States) New York City	September 21–24 (United States) New York City	
SOA (OAS)		none			June 8–10 (United States) Los Angeles
██ = Did not attend

== See also ==
- 2018 Colombian presidential election
- Foreign relations of Colombia
- List of international presidential trips made by Juan Manuel Santos, his predecessor
- List of international presidential trips made by Gustavo Petro, his successor
- President of Colombia
