= Tomisato =

Tomisato 富里市
- City
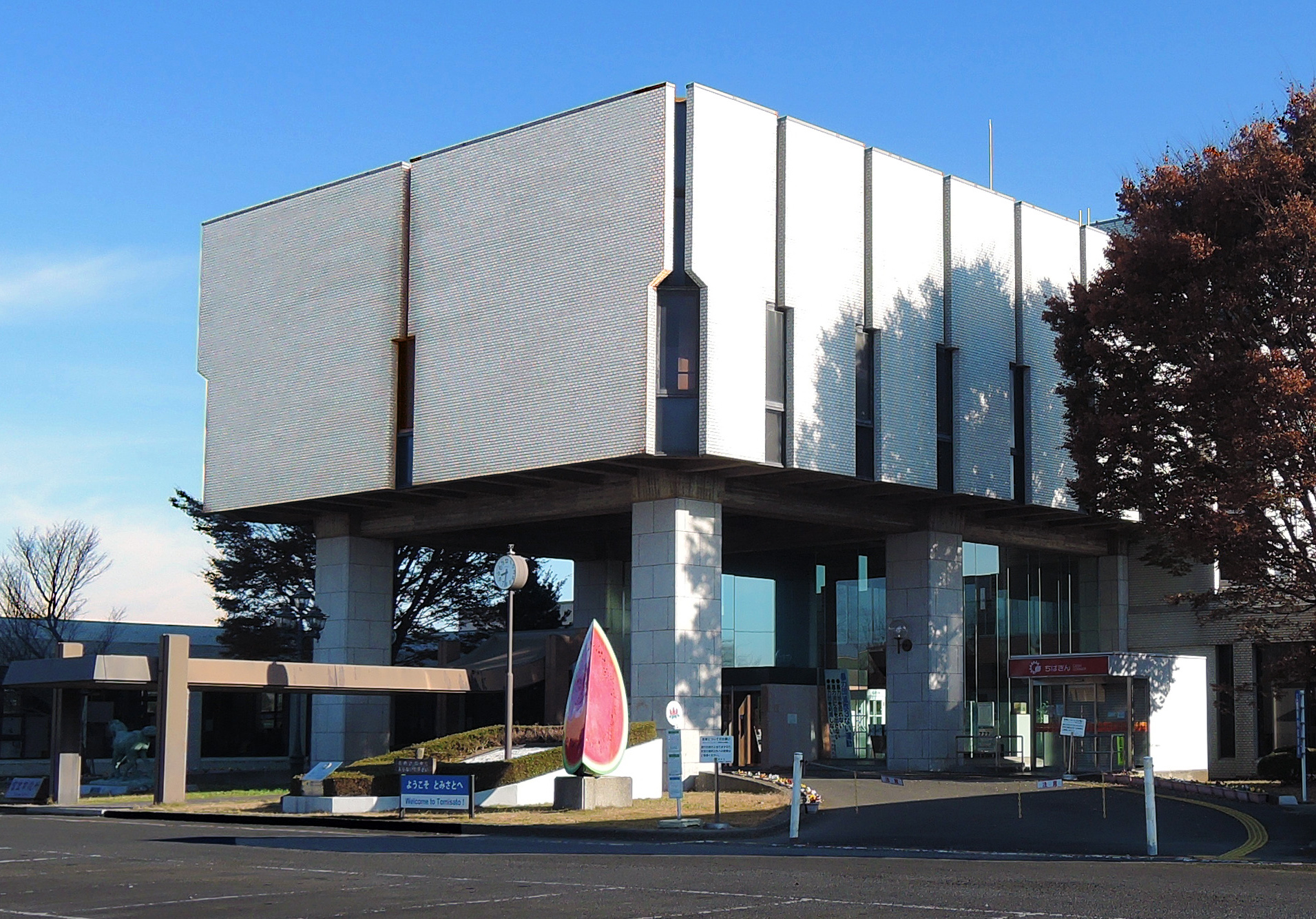
- Tomisato City hall

- Flag Seal

- Location of Tomisato in Chiba Prefecture

- Coordinates: 35°42′N 140°34′E
- Country: Japan
- Region: Kantō
- Prefecture: Chiba

Area
  - Total: 53.91 km^{2} (20.81 sq mi)

Population (November 2020)
  - Total: 49,914
  - Density: 925.9/km^{2} (2,398/sq mi)
- Time zone: UTC+9 (Japan Standard Time)
- -Tree: Sakura
- Flower: Salvia splendens
- Phone number: 0476-93-1111
- Address: 652-1 Nanaei Tomisato-shi, Chiba-ken 285-8510
- Website: Official website

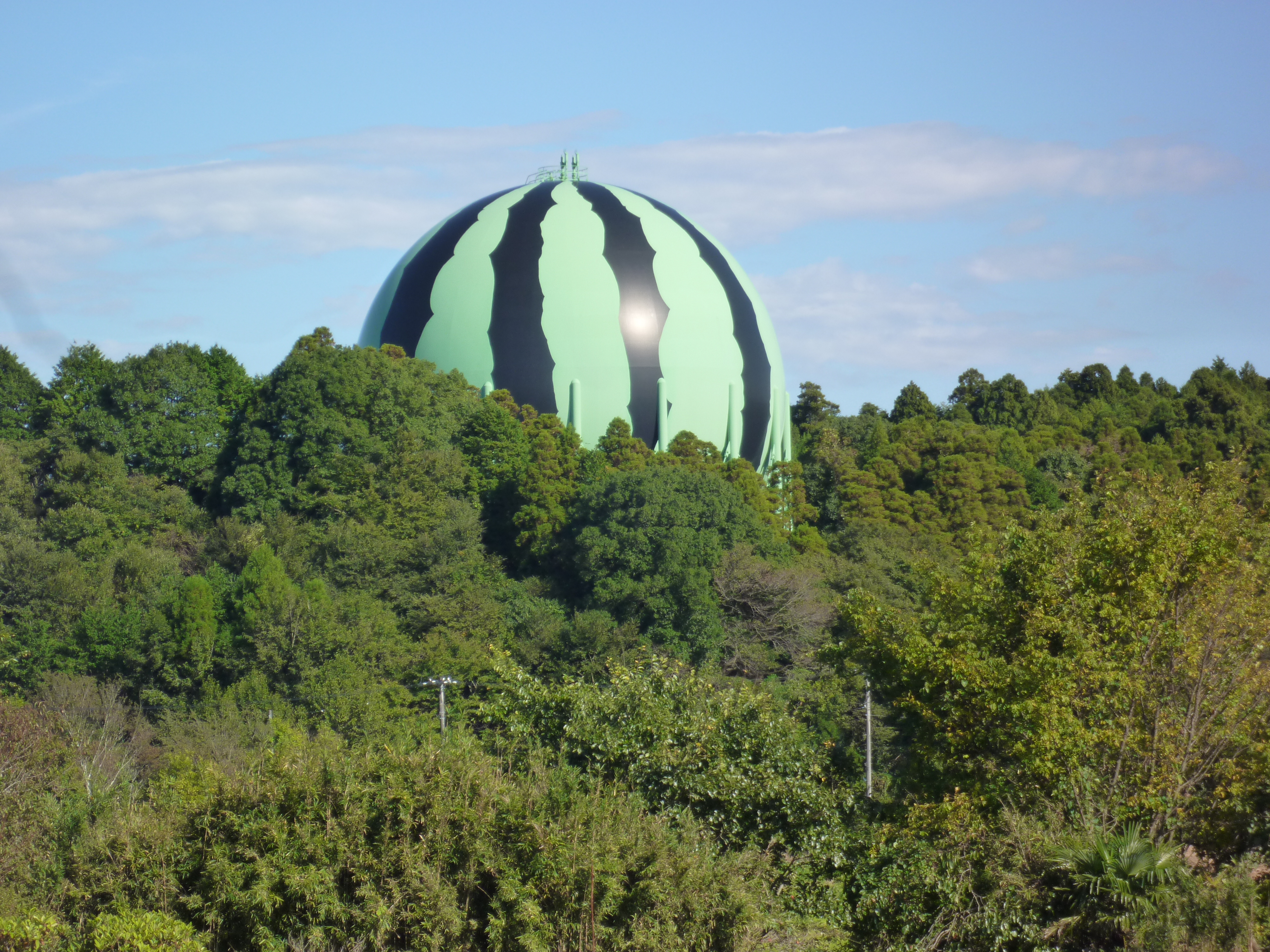
Chiba Gas LNG storage tank in Tomisato

Tomisato (富里市, Tomisato-shi) is a city located in Chiba Prefecture, Japan. As of 1 November 2020, the city had an estimated population of 49,914 in 23,753 households and a population density of 930 persons per km^{2}. The total area of the city is 53.91 square kilometres (20.81 sq mi).

== Geography ==
Tomisato is located in the northern center of Chiba prefecture, about 25 kilometers from the prefectural capital at Chiba, and 50 to 60 kilometers from central Tokyo. It is also within 5 kilometers of Narita International Airport.

=== Neighboring municipalities ===
Chiba Prefecture

- Narita
- Sanmu
- Shibayama
- Shisui
- Yachimata

=== Climate ===
Tomisato has a humid subtropical climate (Köppen Cfa) characterized by warm summers and cool winters with light to no snowfall. The average annual temperature in Tomisato is 14.7 °C. The average annual rainfall is 1475 mm with September as the wettest month. The temperatures are highest on average in August, at around 26.0 °C, and lowest in January, at around 4.4 °C.

== Demographics ==
Per Japanese census data, the population of Tomisato has recently plateaued after several decades of strong growth.

Historical population
| Year | Pop. | ±% |
|---|---|---|
| 1920 | 7,803 | — |
| 1930 | 8,370 | +7.3% |
| 1940 | 8,944 | +6.9% |
| 1950 | 12,891 | +44.1% |
| 1960 | 12,307 | −4.5% |
| 1970 | 12,116 | −1.6% |
| 1980 | 23,315 | +92.4% |
| 1990 | 42,852 | +83.8% |
| 2000 | 50,176 | +17.1% |
| 2010 | 51,087 | +1.8% |
| 2020 | 47,935 | −6.2% |

== History ==
During the Edo period, Tomisato was part of Shimōsa Province and was an area where the Tokugawa Shogunate had numerous ranches for raising horse. After the Meiji restoration, Tomisato Village was founded on April 1, 1889, within Inba District, Chiba Prefecture with the establishment of the modern municipalities system, and the government encouraged the settlement of the area by farmers. During the 1960s and 1970s, the village was the center of the Sanrizuka Struggle against the construction of the Narita International Airport. After the airport was completed, the population of the village grew rapidly. On April 1, 1985, it was elevated to town status, and later was elevated to city status on April 1, 2002.

== Government ==
Tomisato has a mayor-council form of government with a directly elected mayor and a unicameral city council of 18 members. Tomisato contributes one member to the Chiba Prefectural Assembly. In terms of national politics, the city is part of Chiba 13th district of the lower house of the Diet of Japan.

== Economy ==
Tomisato is a regional commercial center whose economy is primarily agricultural. About 68% or more of the area is forest and farmland, and about 14% is residential area. The main crops are rice and watermelons. The city is also a bedroom community for workers at Narita Airport, with a commuting rate to Narita city of 27.5% (2010 census).

== Education ==
Tomisato has eight public elementary schools and three public middle schools operated by the city government, and one public high school operated by the Chiba Prefectural Board of Education. The prefecture also operates one special education school for the handicapped.

== Transportation ==
=== Railway ===
Tomisato itself is not currently served by passenger railway stations. The Narita Railway Company's Yachimata Line operated from 1914 to 1940. However, Narita Station and Keisei Narita Station in central Narita are both adjacent the Tomisato border.

=== Highway ===
- Higashi-Kantō Expressway
- National Route 298
- National Route 409
