= Hisashi Matsumoto =

Japanese politician (born 1962)

- 松本 尚
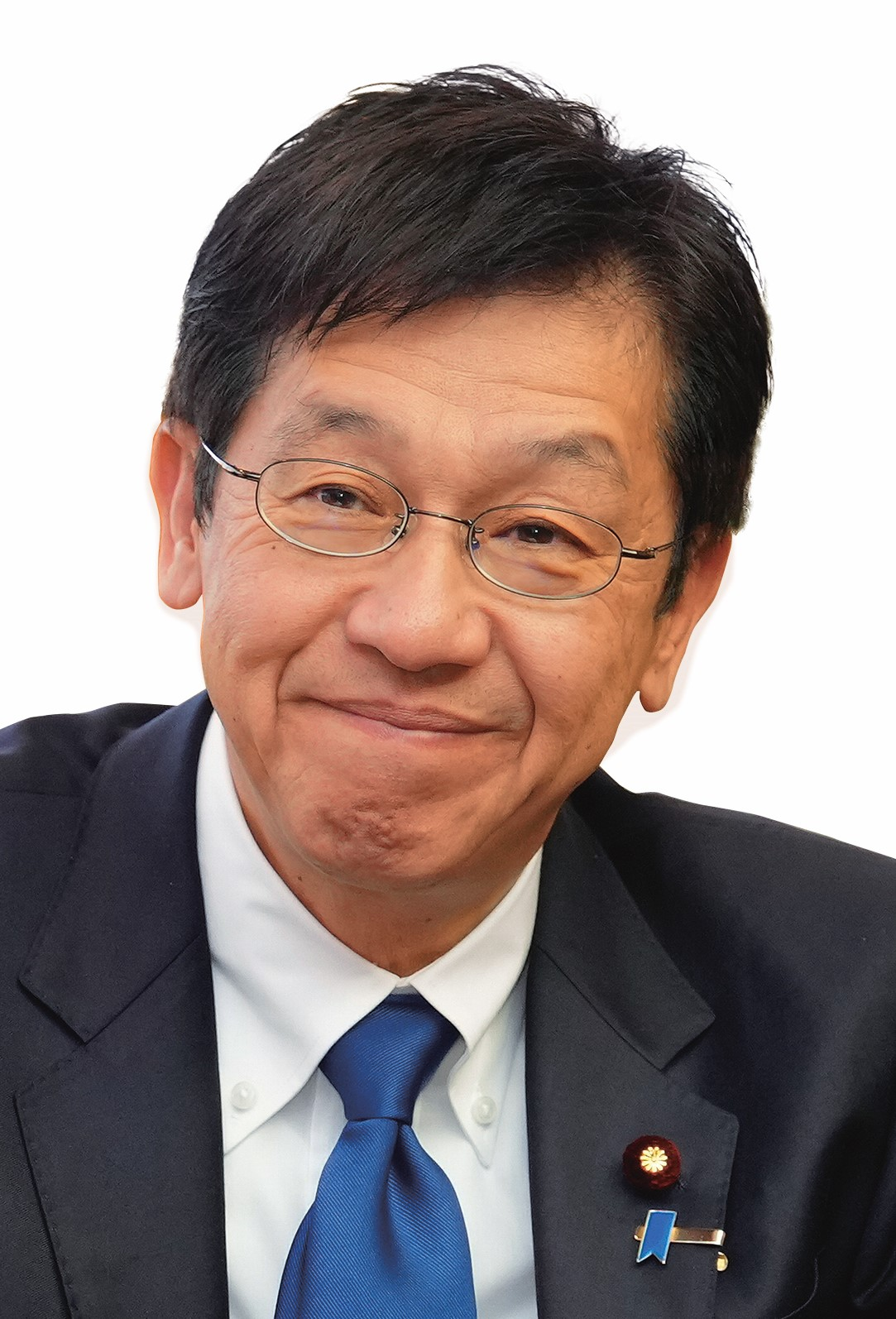
- Official portrait, 2025

Minister for Digital Transformation
- In office 21 October 2025 – 17 September 2026
- Prime Minister: Sanae Takaichi
- Preceded by: Masaaki Taira
- Succeeded by: Toshiharu Furukawa

Member of the House of Representatives
- Incumbent
- Assumed office 31 October 2021
- Preceded by: Takaki Shirasuka
- Constituency: Chiba 13th

Personal details
- Born: 3 June 1962 (age 64) Kanazawa, Ishikawa Prefecture, Japan
- Party: LDP
- Education: Kanazawa University

Hisashi Matsumoto (松本 尚, Matsumoto Hisashi; born 3 June 1962) is a Japanese politician of the Liberal Democratic Party, who serves as a member of the House of Representatives in the Diet (national legislature).

== Early years ==
He was born in 1962 in Kanazawa, Ishikawa Prefecture. He graduated from the medical department of Kanazawa University.

After working at Kanazawa University and other places, he was involved in emergency services at the Hokuso Hospital Emergency Life Center of Nippon Medical School and was involved in the operation of a doctor helicopter.

== Political career ==
On 21 April 2021, Liberal Democratic Party's Chiba Prefectural Confederation appointed Matsumoto as the head of the Chiba 13th district branch, which is the candidate for that constituency, to replace Takaki Shirasuka, who had left the LDP due to scandals.

In October 2021, Matsumoto ran in Chiba 13th under LDP's nomination and was elected.

In September 2023, he was appointed Parliamentary Vice-Minister of Defense in Second Kishida Second Reshuffled Cabinet.
