= Lake Inba =

Lake in Chiba Prefecture, Japan

- 印旛沼 (Japanese)
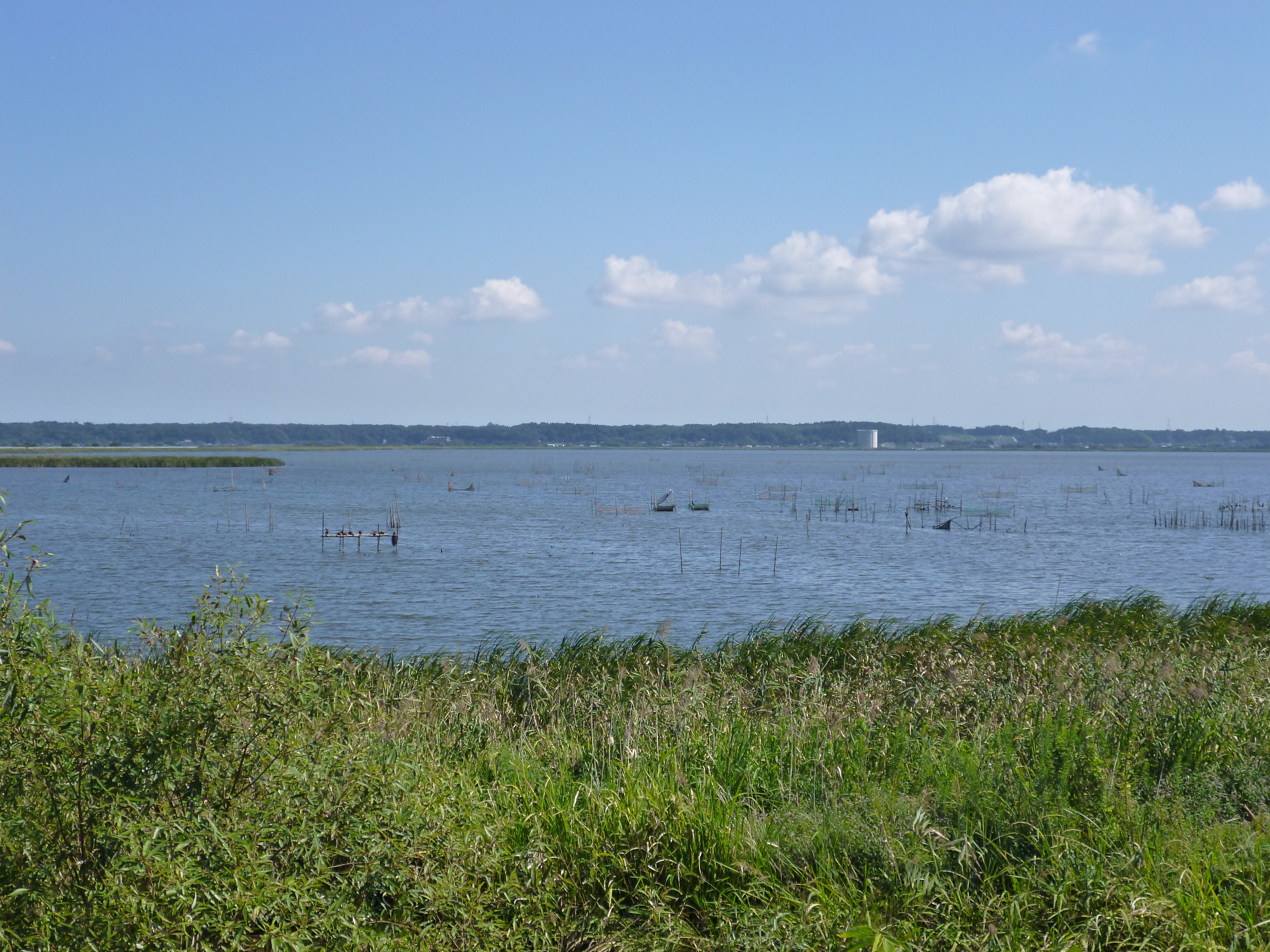
- View of the lake from Inzai

- Location within Japan Location within Chiba Prefecture
- Location: Chiba Prefecture, Japan
- Coordinates: 35°46′37.5″N 140°13′55.2″E
- Type: Polder
- River sources: Nagato River; Kashima River; Moroto River; Takasaki River; Teguri River; Kanzaki River; Kannō River; Shin River
- Catchment area: 494 square kilometres (191 sq mi)
- Basin countries: Japan
- Max. depth: 4.8 metres (16 ft) (north); 2.9 metres (9 ft 6 in) (west)
- Water volume: 19,700,000 cubic metres (700,000,000 cu ft)
- Islands: 0
- Sections/sub-basins: North Lake Inba (北印旛沼, Kita Inba-numa); West Lake Inba (西印旛沼, Nishi Inba-numa); Inba Cutoff Canal (印旛捷水路, Inba Shōsuiro)
- Settlements: Inzai; Narita; Sakae; Sakura; Yachiyo

Lake Inba (印旛沼, Inba-numa) is a man-made polder lake consisting of northern and western sections connected by a canal and located in Inba Tega Prefectural Natural Park in the Tone River basin in Chiba Prefecture, Japan. It is the largest lake in the prefecture. It was formed from remnants of the Katori Sea after the Tone River was diverted.

It is a popular location for outdoor activities, including fishing, bicycling, and birding, and is home to numerous species of plants, birds, and other wildlife. The National Museum of Japanese History is located on the grounds of the ruins of Sakura Castle, southwest of the lake. It is easily accessible through a number of train and bus services.

The lake is also variously known as Lake Imba, Lake Imbanuma, Inbanuma, and Imbanuma.

== Geography and history ==
Lake Inba is located in Inba Tega Prefectural Natural Park, and is the largest lake in Chiba Prefecture, with an original surface area of 25.8 square kilometres (10.0 mi^{2}). It is a man-made lake created by the natural damming of a small valley, and it is the largest lake in Chiba Prefecture. The lake is within the Shimōsa Plateau, which covers most of northern part of the prefecture. After multiple land reclamation projects, similar to those carried out on Lake Teganuma, its surface area was significantly reduced to about 13.1 square kilometres (5.1 mi^{2}), before being further reduced to 9.43 square kilometres (3.64 mi^{2}).

About 1000 years ago, the Tone River flowed into what is now Tokyo Bay, and the area where Lake Inba is now located was part of the inland Katori Sea and was called Inbaura (印旛浦). As part of a large project to control flooding in the Tokyo area during the Edo Period, the river's course was diverted to flow into the Pacific Ocean, with its mouth now at Chōshi. The Katori Sea was slowly filled in and the remaining water and land desalinated, and a large swampy area that eventually drained into Tokyo Bay was created.

Lake Inba was a large, swampy area containing a W-shaped lake of about 25.8 square kilometres (10.0 mi^{2}) until the 1930s. A project completed in 1949 reduced the surface area of the lake almost in half, and split the lake into northern and western sections connected by the Inba Cutoff Canal (印旛捷水路, Inba Shōsuiro). The Inba Cutoff Canal is listed as one of the top 100 canals in Japan. The northern section reaches depths of 4.8 metres (16 ft), while the western section is shallower at about 2.9 metres (9 ft 6 in) maximum depth. A reclamation project completed from 1963 to 1969 developed additional water resources, improved area rice fields, and better managed flooding. The lake contains no islands.

Due to population increases in the area during the 1970s, nutrient runoff into the lake began causing blue-green algae blooms, an increase in water chestnut growth, and municipal water odors. Various education programs and better handling of wastewater have reduced these issues.

The lake spans multiple municipalities, including the cities of Inzai, Narita, Sakura, and Yachiyo, and the town of Sakae. The drainage basin, which spans 494 square kilometres (191 sq mi), includes these municipalities as well as the cities of Chiba, Funabashi, Kamagaya, Yotsukaidō, Yachimata, Shiroi, and Tomisato, and the town of Shisui. The population found within the lake's basin is about 794,000 as of 2020.

There are numerous rivers that empty into Lake Inba. These include the Nagato River, Kashima River, Moroto River, Takasaki River, Teguri River, Kanzaki River, Kannō River, and Shin River. The lake holds a water volume of about 19,700,000 cubic metres (700,000,000 cu ft), and each year supplies about 34,831,000 cubic metres (45,557,000 cu yd) of potable water, 47,368,000 cubic metres (61,955,000 cu yd) of water for industrial uses, and 76,876,000 cubic metres (100,550,000 cu yd) for agricultural uses.

== Flora and fauna ==
Lake Inba supports a variety of plants and animals in the lake and its surrounding environs. Major plants found there include the hornwort, common reed, Japanese reed, the water snowflake, various eelgrasses, the fringed water lily, Carolina fanwort, Manchurian wild rice, water chestnut, pondweeds such as potamogeton wrightii and potamogeton lucens, western waterweed, the lesser bullrush, spiny water nymph, trapa incisa, various members of the water caltrop genus, hydrocharis dubia, and the lotus. A number of species of phytoplankton are also found in the lake, including microcystis, cyclotella, and chlamydomonas.

Fish found in the lake include the common carp, the Japanese bitterling, tamoroko, pond loach, pond smelt, Japanese halfbeak, icefish, Japanese eel, kawahigai, hasu, oikawa, mugitsuku, Chinese false grudgeon, and various types of Crucian carps and gobies.

Inba Lake is a popular birding destination due to many birds frequenting the lake and the surrounding wetlands. Birds found there include yellow, Eurasian, and Schrenk's bitterns (though the latter is very rare), Oriental reed warblers, ducks such as the falcated and Baikal teals and the smew, Japanese green pheasants, Siberian meadow buntings, Japanese buzzards, kestrels, sparrowhawks, and eastern marsh harriers. A single great white pelican has been living at the lake since the early 2000s.

== Recreation and access ==
The lake features relatively-flat bicycle paths along most of the shoreline, including the main canal, and bicycles can be rented. The cycling path continues for a few kilometers along the Shin River off the western section, and along the western shore of the northern section up to the Sakano Water Gate on the Nagato River. It is also a popular fishing and birding destination.

The National Museum of Japanese History is located on the grounds of the ruins of Sakura Castle, southeast of the western section of the lake in Sakura. The castle ruins are 20th on Japan's Top 100 Castles list by the Japan Castle Foundation. A Dutch windmill and fields of tulips are located next to the lake.

There are no toilet facilities at the lake.

=== Transportation ===
Narita International Airport is located about 11.3 kilometres (7.0 mi) southeast of Lake Inba. The Higashi-Kantō Expressway, a limited-access toll road, runs east-west and then northeast several kilometers south (and then east) of the lake. The lake is accessible from the Tomisato, Narita, Shisui, and Sakura Interchanges.

The following railway stations are within about 6 kilometres (3.7 mi) of Lake Inba (listed by line, then by distance):

- Keisei Narita Airport Line
  - Keisei-Usui (Sakura) – 1.3 kilometres (0.81 mi)
  - Sōgosandō (Shisui) – 2.5 kilometres (1.6 mi)
  - Kōzunomori (Narita) – 3.1 kilometres (1.9 mi), has buses that go to the lake
  - Keisei Sakura (Sakura) – 3.3 kilometres (2.1 mi), has buses that go to the lake
  - Yūkarigaoka Station (Sakura) – 3.4 kilometres (2.1 mi)
  - Ōsakura (Sakura) – 3.8 kilometres (2.4 mi)
  - Shizu (Sakura) – 4.5 kilometres (2.8 mi)
  - Keisei Shisui (Shisui) – 4.7 kilometres (2.9 mi)
  - Keisei Narita (Narita) – 4.8 kilometres (3.0 mi)
- Narita Line
  - Shimōsa-Manzaki (Narita) – 1.3 kilometres (0.81 mi)
  - Sakura (Sakura) – 2.6 kilometres (1.6 mi) (also on the Sōbu Main Line)
  - Ajiki (Sakae – 3 kilometres (1.9 mi)
  - Shisui (Shisui) – 4.4 kilometres (2.7 mi)
  - Kobayashi (Inzai) – 4.8 kilometres (3.0 mi)
  - Narita (Narita) – 5.3 kilometres (3.3 mi)
  - Monoi (Yotsukaidō) – 5.75 kilometres (3.57 mi)
- Hokusō Line
  - Imba Nihon-idai (Inzai) – 3.6 kilometres (2.2 mi)
  - Inzai-Makinohara (Inzai) – 5 kilometres (3.1 mi)

All stations on the looping Yamaman Yūkarigaoka Line are near the west end of the west section of the lake.

=== Surrounding area ===
- Chiba New Town
- National Route 16
- National Route 51
- National Route 296
- National Route 356
- National Route 464
- Ryūkaku-ji, located on a plateau near the lake

== See also ==
- List of lakes in japan
