= Inba =

INBA or Inba may refer to:

Chile

- Internado Nacional Barros Arana, a secondary school

India

- Inba (film), a 2008 Tamil-language film

Japan

- Inba, Chiba, a village
- Inba District, Chiba
- Lake Inba, a lake in Chiba Prefecture

Mexico

- Instituto Nacional de Bellas Artes, the National Fine Arts Institute

United States

- Illinois News Broadcasters Association
- International Natural Bodybuilding Association, a governing body in natural bodybuilding
