= Shin River (Chiba) =

Coordinates: 35°43′42″N 140°6′43.52″E

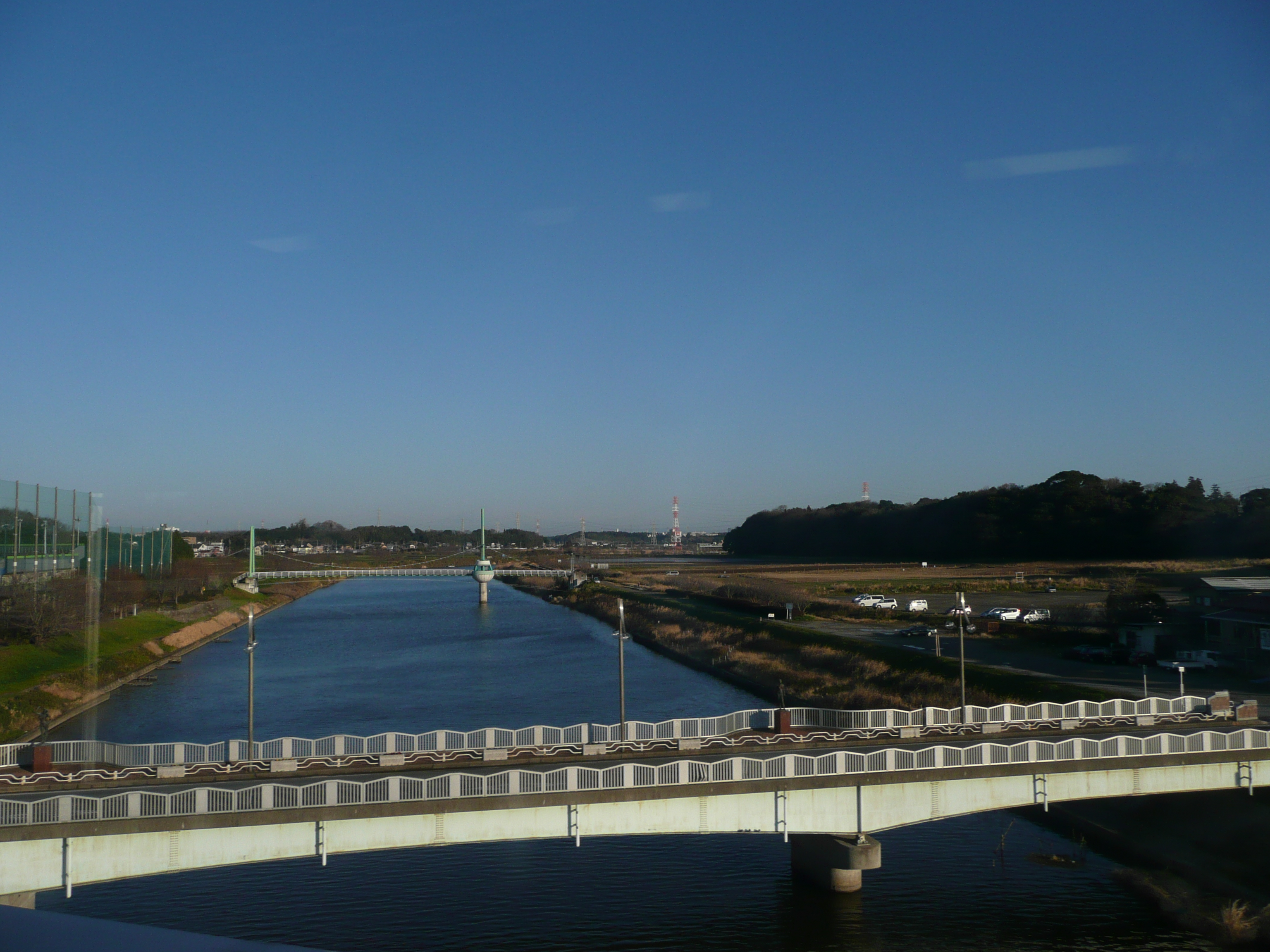
- Railroad bridge over Shin River, Tōyō Rapid Railway Line from Yachiyo-Chūō Station to Murakami Station, Yachiyo, Chiba Prefecture
- Inba Discharge Channel (Lake Inba -> Shin River -> #1: Ōwada Drainage Pump Station -> Hanami River -> Tokyo Bay)
- Native name: 新川 (Japanese)

Location
- Country: Japan

Physical characteristics
- Source
  - location: Yachiyo, Chiba Prefecture
- Mouth
  - location: Ōwada Drainage Pump Station, Yachiyo City
  - elevation: 0 m (0 ft)
- Length: 10 km (6.2 mi)

The Shin River (新川, Shin-gawa) is a river in Yachiyo and Chiba, Chiba Prefecture, Japan. The river is 10 kilometers (6.2 mi) in length. The Shin River forms the upper part of the Inba Discharge Channel (印旛放水路, Inba Hōsuiro), and flows between Lake Inba and the Ōwada Drainage Pump Station in Yachiyo City. Pollution is problematic along the river. Phosphorus, potassium, and nitrogen drain from vegetable farms along the length of the river.

== Recreation ==
A large-scale bicycle path, the Inbanuma Bicycle Path, is under construction to span the entirety of the Inba Discharge Channel. The path will ultimately pass through Chiba City, Yachiyo, Sakura, and Inba. A 19 kilometers (12 mi) walking path has also been built in Yachiyo along the Shin River, and features a pedestrian suspension bridge with an observation platform.
