= Motono, Chiba =

Motono 本埜村
- Former municipality
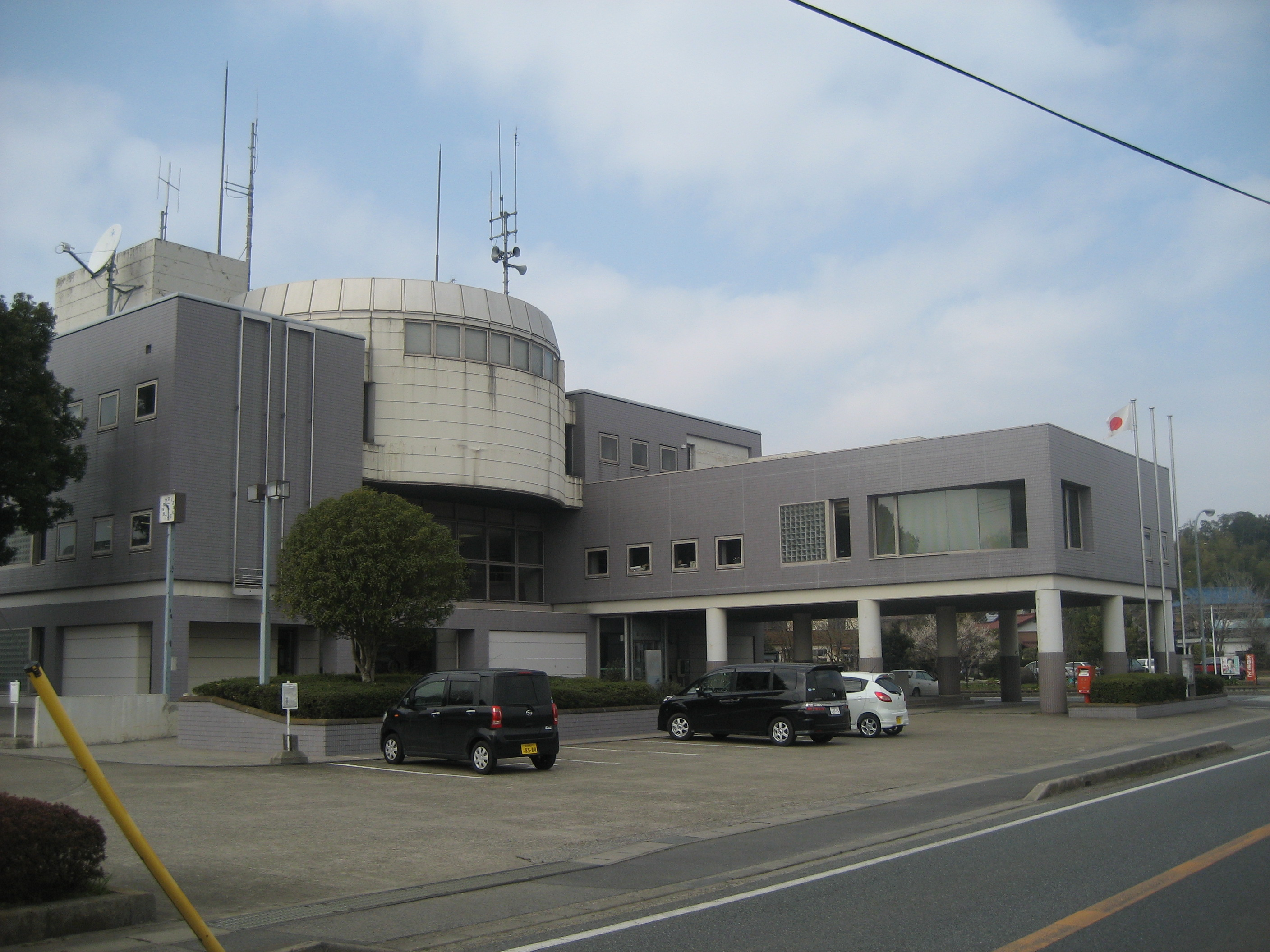
- former Motono Village Hall

- Location of Motono in Chiba Prefecture

- Location in Japan
- Coordinates: 35°49′N 140°12′E
- Country: Japan
- Region: Kantō
- Prefecture: Chiba Prefecture
- District: Inba
- Merged: March 23, 2010 (now part of Inzai)

Area
  - Total: 23.72 km^{2} (9.16 sq mi)

Population (November 1, 2005)
  - Total: 9,055
  - Density: 382/km^{2} (990/sq mi)
- Time zone: UTC+09:00 (JST)
- Symbols
- Bird: Swan, Japanese white-eye
- Flower: Broccolini, narcissus
- Tree: Osmanthus

Motono (本埜村, Motono-mura) was a village located in Inba District, Chiba Prefecture, Japan.

Motono Village was created on April 1, 1914, through the merger of Hongo and Yawara Villages. The development of Chiba New Town greatly accelerated the development of the village, which became a bedroom community for Chiba.

As of February 2011, the village had an estimated population of 9,055 and a density of 382 persons per km^{2}. The total area was 23.72 km^{2}.

On March 23, 2010, Motono, along with the village of Inba (also from Inba District), was merged into the expanded city of Inzai.
