= Inba Tega Prefectural Natural Park =

Natural park of Chiba prefecture, Japan

- 県立印旛手賀自然公園
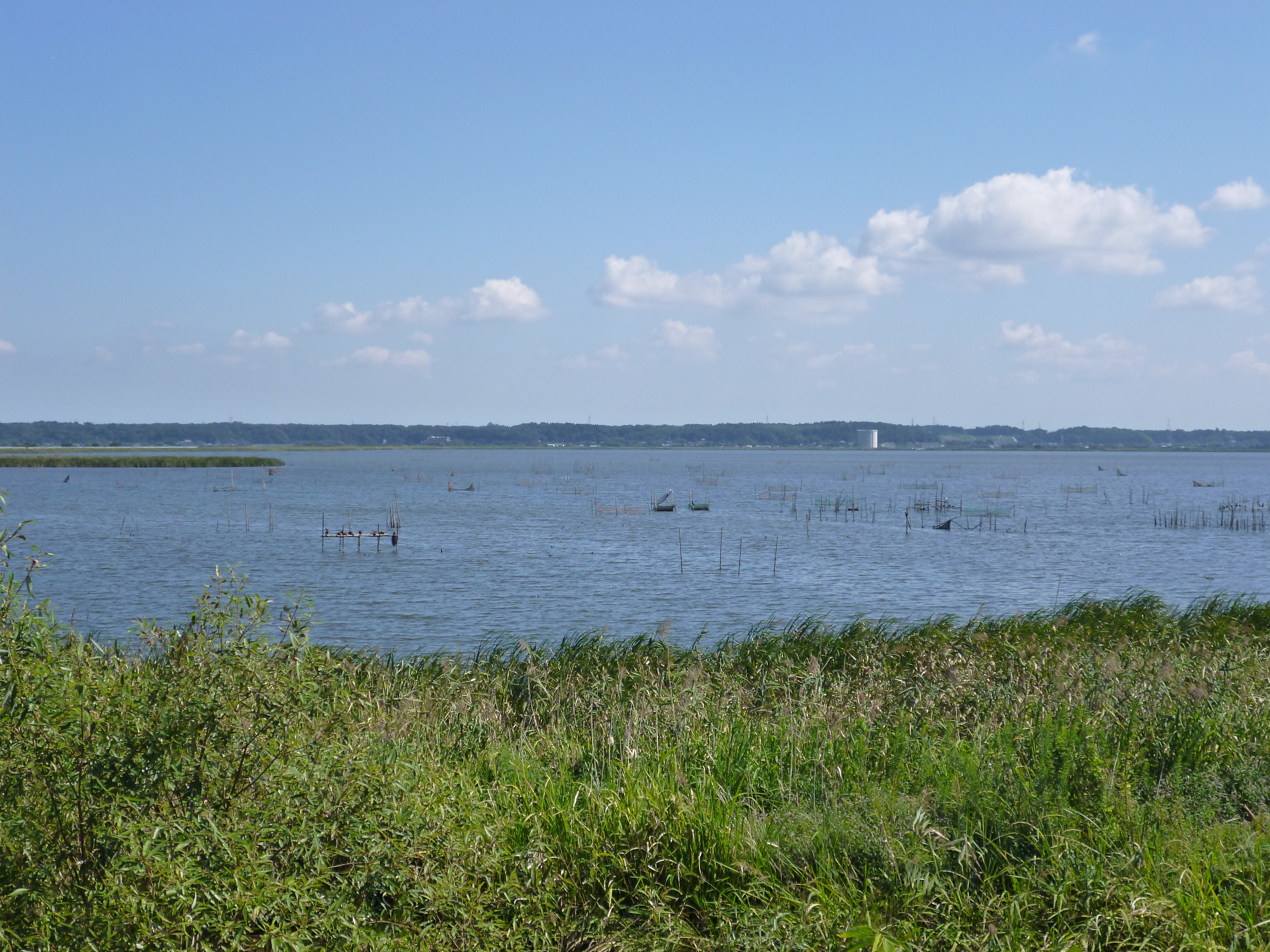
- Lake Inba
- Interactive map of Inba Tega Prefectural Natural Park
- Location: Chiba Prefecture, Japan
- Coordinates: 35°45′02″N 140°12′07″E
- Area: 66.06 km^{2} (25.51 sq mi)
- Established: 24 October 1952

Inba Tega Prefectural Natural Park (県立印旛手賀自然公園, Kenritsu Inba Tega shizen kōen) is a Prefectural Natural Park in northern Chiba Prefecture, Japan. First designated for protection in 1952, the park's central features are Inba Marsh (印旛沼) and Tega Marsh (手賀沼). The park spans the borders of seven municipalities: Abiko, Inzai, Kashiwa, Narita, Sakae, Sakura, and Shisui. The marshes provide an important wetland habitat for wild birds.

== See also ==
- National Parks of Japan
- Ramsar sites in Japan
