= Aikoku Gakuen University =

Coordinates: 35°39′57.51″N 140°09′42.06″E

- 愛国学園大学; Aikoku gakuen daigaku
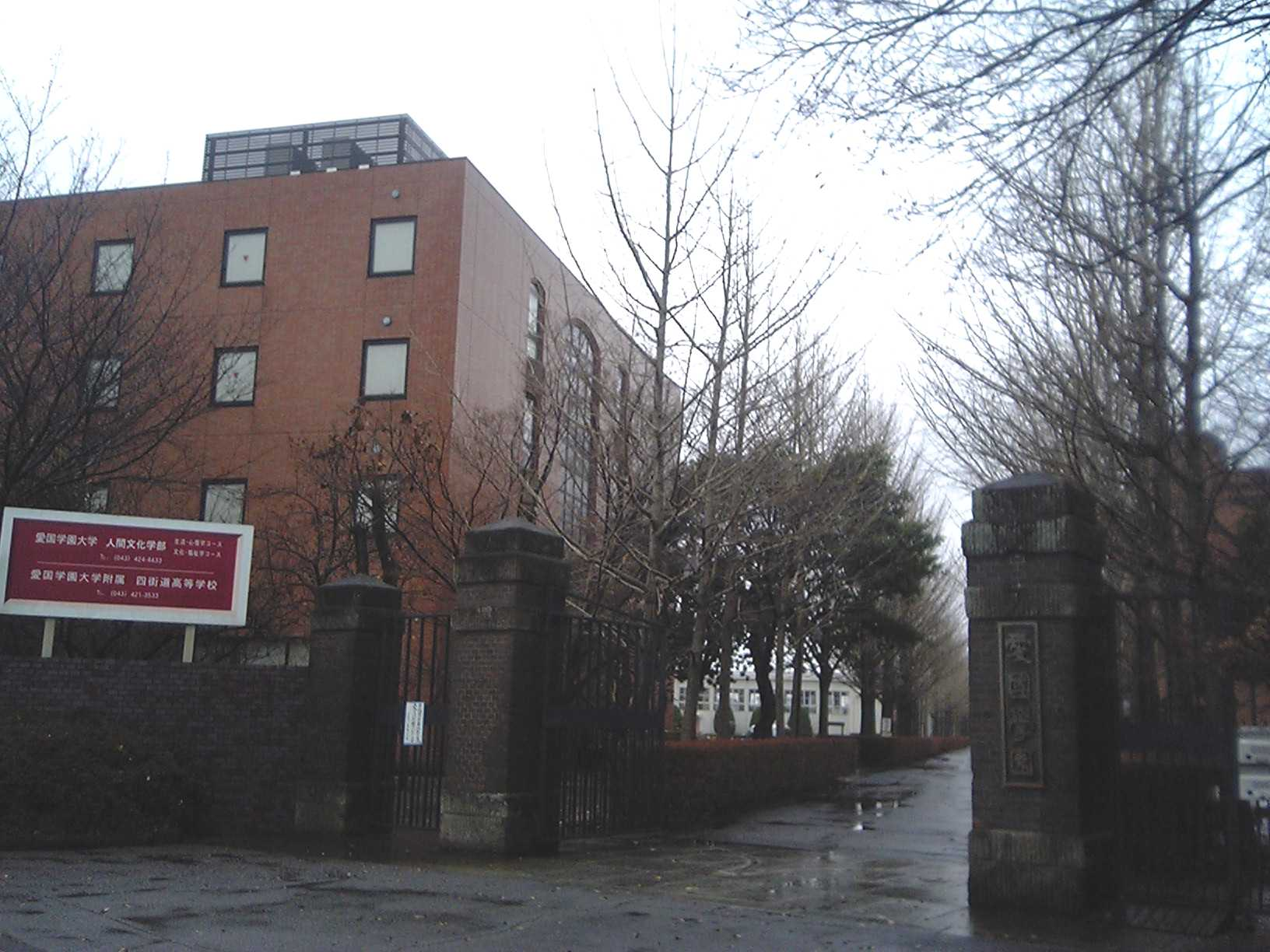
- Type: Private
- Established: 1938
- Location: Yotsukaido, Chiba, Japan
- Website: Official website

Aikoku Gakuen University (愛国学園大学, Aikoku gakuen daigaku) is a private university in Yotsukaido, Chiba, Japan, established in 1998. The predecessor of the school was founded in 1938. The university also has an attached junior college. The word "Aikoku" means "patriotism" in Japanese.

== Alumni ==
- Official website (in Japanese)
