= Inzai =

Inzai 印西市
- City
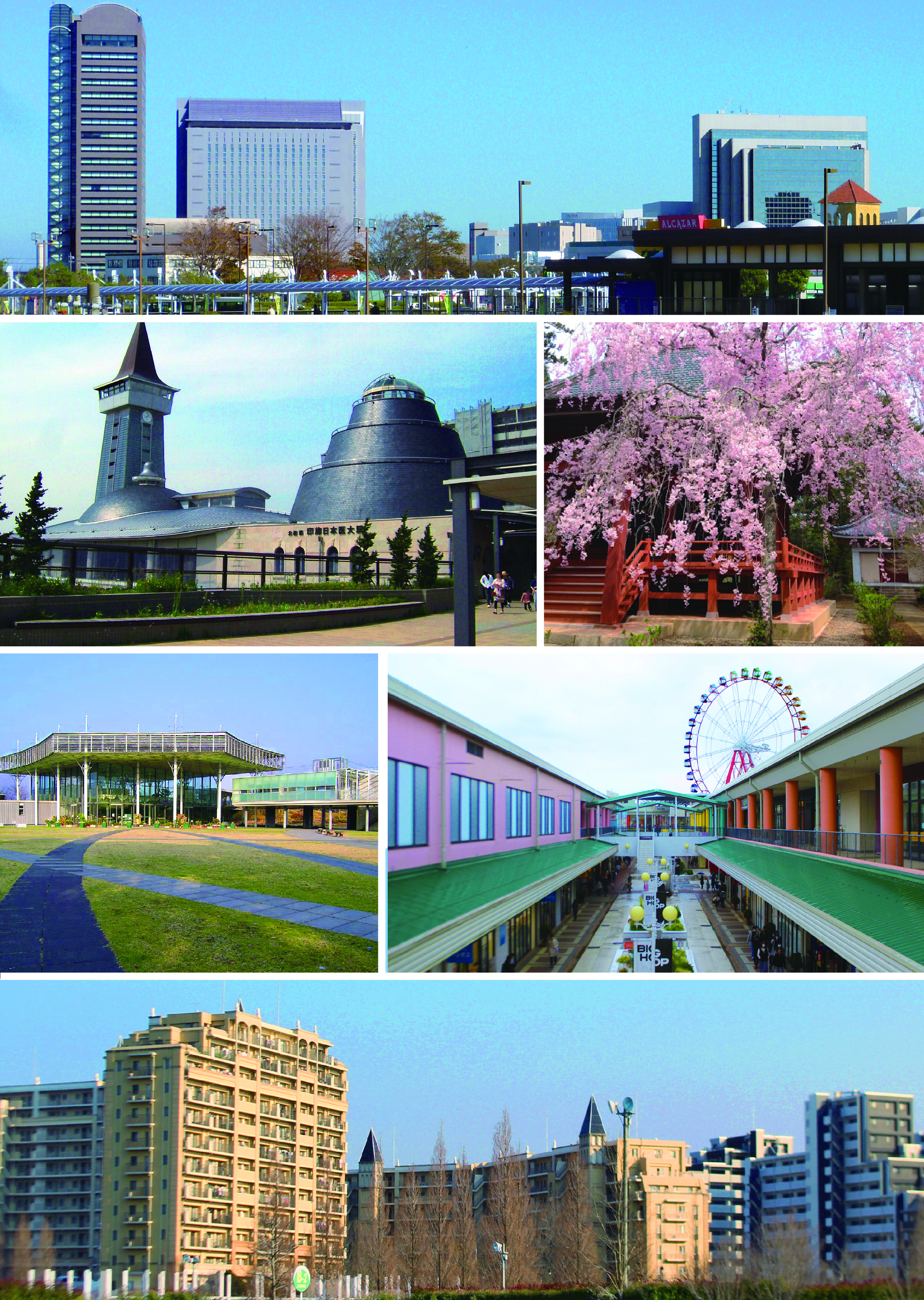
Chiba New Town
Imba Nihon-idai Station	Matsumushi-dera
Hokuso Hana-ga-oka Park	BIGHOP Mall Inzai
Inzai-Makinohara Station surroundings
- Flag Seal

- Location of Inzai in Chiba Prefecture

- Coordinates: 35°50′N 140°09′E
- Country: Japan
- Region: Kantō
- Prefecture: Chiba

Government
  - Mayor: Kengo Fujishiro (since July 2024)

Area
  - Total: 123.80 km^{2} (47.80 sq mi)

Population (February 2024)
  - Total: 111,266
  - Density: 898.76/km^{2} (2,327.8/sq mi)
- Time zone: UTC+9 (Japan Standard Time)
- -Tree: Japanese Black Pine
- Flower: Cosmos
- Phone number: 0476-42-5111
- Address: 2364 Omori, Inzai-shi, Chiba-ken 270-1396
- Website: Official website

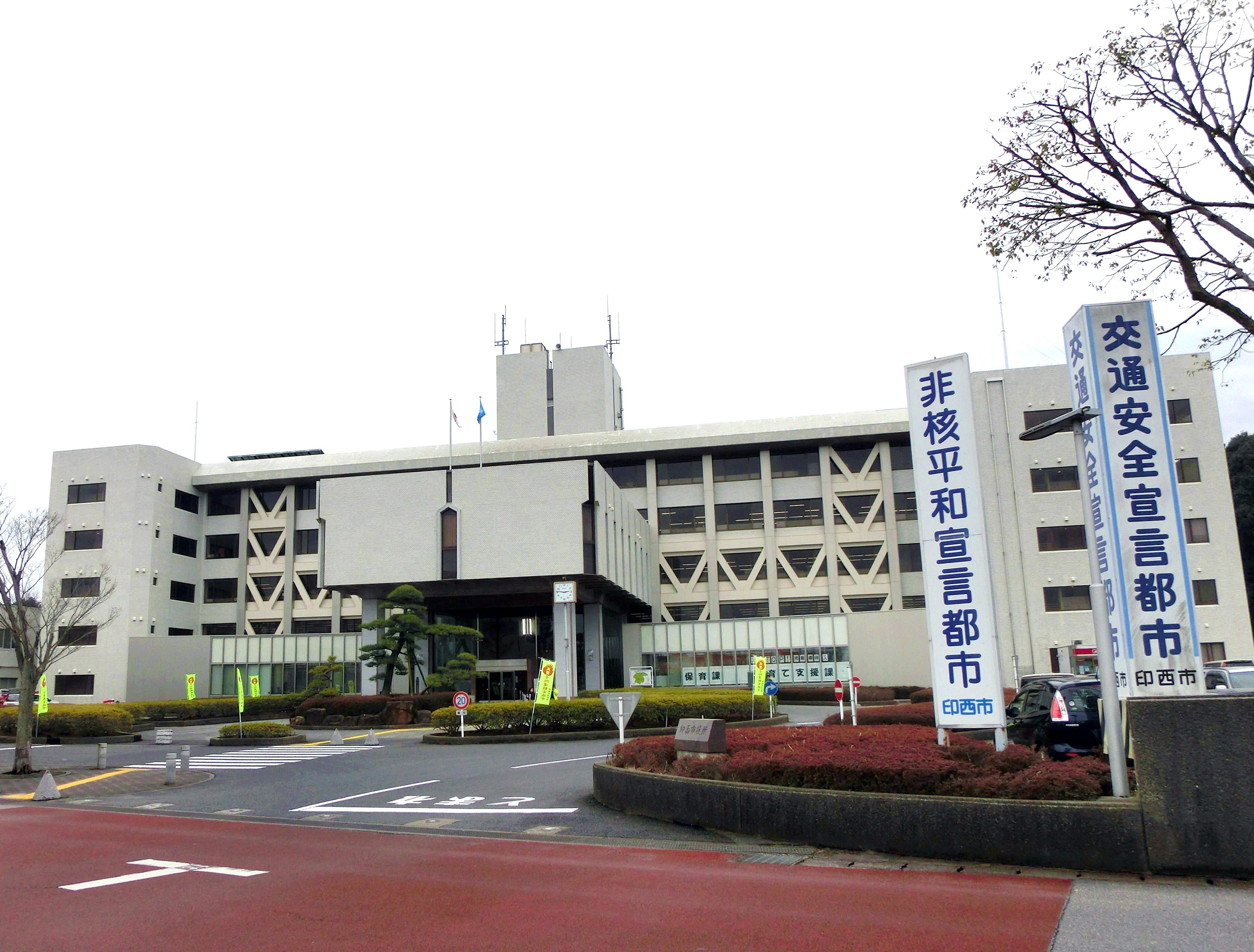
Inzai City Hall

Inzai (印西市, Inzai-shi; Japanese pronunciation: [íǹ.d͡zä̀ì, ìń.d͡zä́.í.ɕì, íń.d͡zä́.í-, -d͡zä́ì.ɕì]) is a city located in Chiba Prefecture, Japan. As of 31 January 2024, the city had an estimated population of 111,266 in 45,717 households and a population density of 900 persons per km^{2}. The total area of the city is 123.80 square kilometres (47.80 sq mi).

== Geography ==
Inzai is located in the important area of northern Chiba Prefecture connecting Tokyo and Narita. Besides Tone River that flows in the north, Lake Tega that lies in the north-west, Lake Inba that lies in the south-east of the city, the city is also surrounded by natural environment such as natural forest. the city is located approximately 20 kilometers from the prefectural capital at Chiba and within 30 to 40 kilometers from central Tokyo. It is located about 15 kilometers from Narita International Airport. The terrain is part of the Shimosa Plateau, with an elevation of 20 to 30 meters.

=== Surrounding municipalities ===
Chiba Prefecture

- Abiko
- Kashiwa
- Narita
- Sakae
- Sakura
- Shiroi
- Shusui
- Yachiyo

Ibaraki Prefecture

- Tone

=== Climate ===
Inzai has a humid subtropical climate (Köppen Cfa) characterized by warm summers and cool winters with light to no snowfall. The average annual temperature in Inzai is 14.8 °C. The average annual rainfall is 1383 mm with September as the wettest month. The temperatures are highest on average in August, at around 26.3 °C, and lowest in January, at around 4.1 °C.

== Demographics ==
Per Japanese census data, the population of Inzai has grown rapidly since 1980.

Historical population
Year	Pop.	±%
1950	31,771	—
1960	30,440	−4.2%
1970	28,011	−8.0%
1980	29,970	+7.0%
1990	55,131	+84.0%
2000	79,780	+44.7%
2010	88,176	+10.5%
2020	102,609	+16.4%

== History ==
The area of Inzai has been inhabited since the Japanese Paleolithic period, with some stone tools having been found in Kikaribyo that were used by people during that time. During the Edo period, the village of Kioroshi developed as a port at the bank of Tone River.

After the Meiji Restoration, on April 1, 1889, the town of Kioroshi, and the villages of Omori, Taisha, Funoho, Rokugo, Munakata, Hongo and Eiji were founded with the establishment of the modern municipalities system. The Meiji Era is also the golden age for steam ships in Tone River sailing from Tokyo to Chōshi. Taisha was raised to town status on March 1, 1913 and renamed Omori Town. In 1942, a pilot training center was built in Sofuke. This place was hit by Allied air raids in World War II. After the war the training center was abandoned.

On December 1, 1954, the town of Inzai was founded through the merger of the towns of Kioroshi and Taisha, and the villages of Eiji and Funaho. At the time the population was about 11,000.

The development of the Chiba New Town project and the Hokusō Line considerably boosted the development of Inzai from the mid-1980s. Inzai was elevated to city status on April 1, 1996.

On March 23, 2010, Inzai absorbed the villages of Inba and Motono (both from Inba District) to create the new and expanded city of Inzai.

== Government ==
Inzai has a mayor-council form of government with a directly elected mayor and a unicameral city council of 22 members. Inzai, together with the neighboring town of Sakae, contributes two members to the Chiba Prefectural Assembly. In terms of national politics, the city is part of Chiba 13th district of the lower house of the Diet of Japan.

== Economy ==
Inzai has mixed economy dominated by large shopping centers and industrial parks. Its location and good transportation connections between Tokyo and Narita International Airport have led to numerous logistics companies establishing warehouse and distribution centers in the city. The development of Chiba New Town has also greatly increased the number of commuter residents, with over 24% of the working population traveling to Tokyo daily.

== Transportation ==
=== Railway ===
JR East – Narita Line

- Kioroshi – Kobayashi

Hokusō Railway Company - Hokusō Line

- Chiba New Town Chūō - Inzai-Makinohara - Inba-Nihon-Idai

=== Highways ===
- National Route 356
- National Route 464

== Education ==
Inzai has 18 public elementary schools and nine public middle schools operated by the city government, and one public high school operated by the Chiba Prefectural Board of Education. The prefecture also operates one special education school for the handicapped.

=== Universities ===
- Juntendo University
- Tokyo Christian University, which shares its campus with Tokyo Christian Theological Seminary.
- Tokyo Denki University

=== Public libraries ===
- Kobayashi Library
- Oguradai Library
- Omori Library
- Sofuke Library

== Local attractions ==
- Cosmos Bridge Evening Scenery
- Kobayashi Farm's Sakura
- Kioroshi Park Monument
- Narashino Country Club, host of Japan Golf Tour and PGA Tour events
- Tone River Morning Fog
- Yokappe Yume Festival, festival is held annually in Kioroshi and Rokken Area.

== Notable people from Inzai ==
- Makiko Furukawa, Olympic volleyball silver medalist
- Miki Honoka, fashion model and actress (Mischievous Kiss: Love in Tokyo)
- Naoki Kobayashi, dancer, choreographer, actor and model, member of the famous J-pop boygroup Exile and the leader and performer of J-pop boygroup Sandaime J Soul Brothers.
- Yōko Maki, actress
- Sayaka Murata, novelist (Convenience Store Woman)
- Ōtori Tanigorō, sumo wrestler
