= Inba, Chiba =

Inba 印旛村
- Former Village
- Flag Emblem

- Location of Inba in Chiba Prefecture

- Location in Japan
- Coordinates: 35°47′N 140°12′E
- Country: Japan
- Region: Kantō
- Prefecture: Chiba Prefecture
- District: Inba
- Merged: March 23, 2010 (now part of Inzai)

Area
  - Total: 46.57 km^{2} (17.98 sq mi)

Population (February 1, 2010)
  - Total: 13,731
  - Density: 295/km^{2} (760/sq mi)
- Time zone: UTC+09:00 (JST)
- Symbols
- Bird: Little grebe
- Flower: Lilium auratum
- Tree: Pine

Inba (印旛村, Inba-mura) was a village located in Inba District, Chiba Prefecture, Japan.

== History ==
Inba Village was created on March 10, 1955 through the merger of Rokugo and Munakata Villages. The development of Chiba New Town greatly accelerated the development of the village, which became a bedroom community for Tokyo.

== Geography ==
As of February 2011, the village had an estimated population of 13,731 and a population density of 295 persons per km^{2}. The total area was 46.57 km^{2}. Lake Inba is located next to it.

On March 23, 2010, Inba, along with the village of Motono (also from Inba District), was merged into the expanded city of Inzai.
