= Nishi-Shiroi Station =

Railway station in Shiroi, Chiba Prefecture, Japan

HS09 Nishi-Shiroi Station 西白井駅
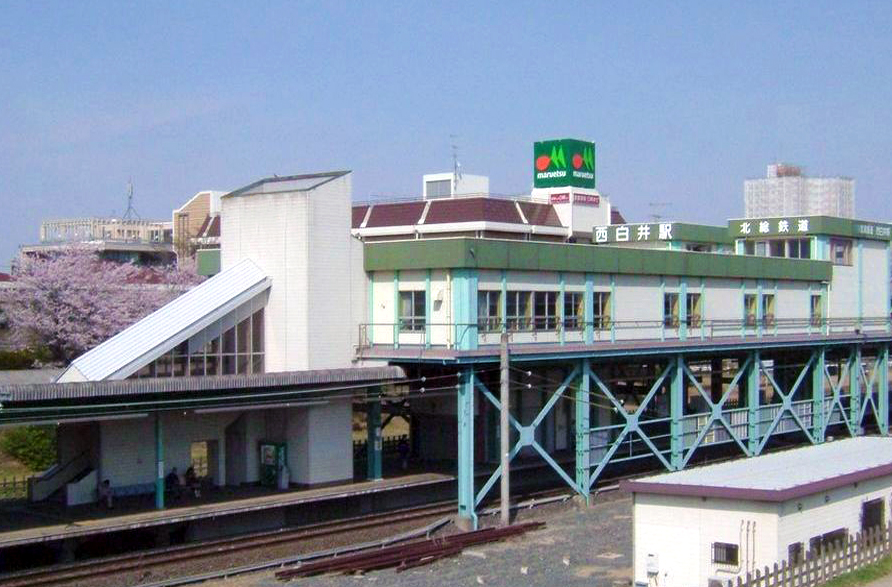
- Nishi-Shiroi Station, April 2008

General information
- Location: 1059-2 Ne, Shiroishi, Chiba-ken 271-0096; Japan
- Coordinates: 35.7844°N 140.0317°E
- Operator: Hokusō Railway
- Line: Hokusō Line
- Distance: 15.8 km from Keisei-Takasago
- Platforms: 1 island platform

Other information
- Status: Staffed
- Station code: HS09
- Website: Official website

History
- Opened: 9 March 1979

Passengers
- FY2018: 12,864

Services
Preceding station	Hokusō Railway	Following station
Shin-Kamagaya HS08 towards Keisei Takasago	Hokusō Line Limited Express Local	Shiroi HS10 towards Imba Nihon-idai
Location
- Location within Chiba Prefecture Location within Japan

Nishi-Shiroi Station (西白井駅, Nishi-Shiroi-eki) is a passenger railway station in the city of Shiroi, Chiba Prefecture, Japan, operated by the third-sector railway operator Hokusō Railway.

== Lines ==
Nishi-Shiroi Station is served by the Hokusō Line and is located 15.8 kilometers from the terminus of the line at Keisei-Takasago.

== Station layout ==
This station consists of a single ground-level island platform serving two tracks, with the station building built above.

=== Platforms ===
1	■ Hokusō Line	for Higashi-Matsudo, Shin-Kamagaya , Keisei-Takasago, Oshiage, Ueno, Shinagawa, and Haneda Airport Domestic Terminal
2	■ Hokusō Line	for Imba Nihon-idai, and Narita Airport

== History ==
Nishi-Shiroi Station was opened on 9 March 1979. On 17 July 2010 a station numbering system was introduced to the Hokusō Line, with the station designated HS09.

== Passenger statistics ==
In fiscal 2018, the station was used by an average of 12,864 passengers daily.

== Surrounding area ==
On certain days, a retired Hokuso 7000 series car is put on static display in a siding near the station.

- Chiba New Town
- Nishi-Shiori Eki-mae Post Office
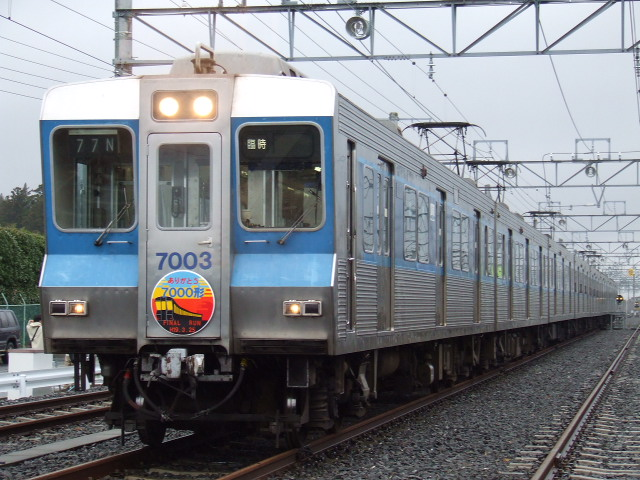
Hokuso 7000 series set during its last day of operation

== See also ==
- List of railway stations in Japan
