= Chiba Keiai Senior High School =

High school in Japan

Coordinates: 35.6665°N 140.1609°E

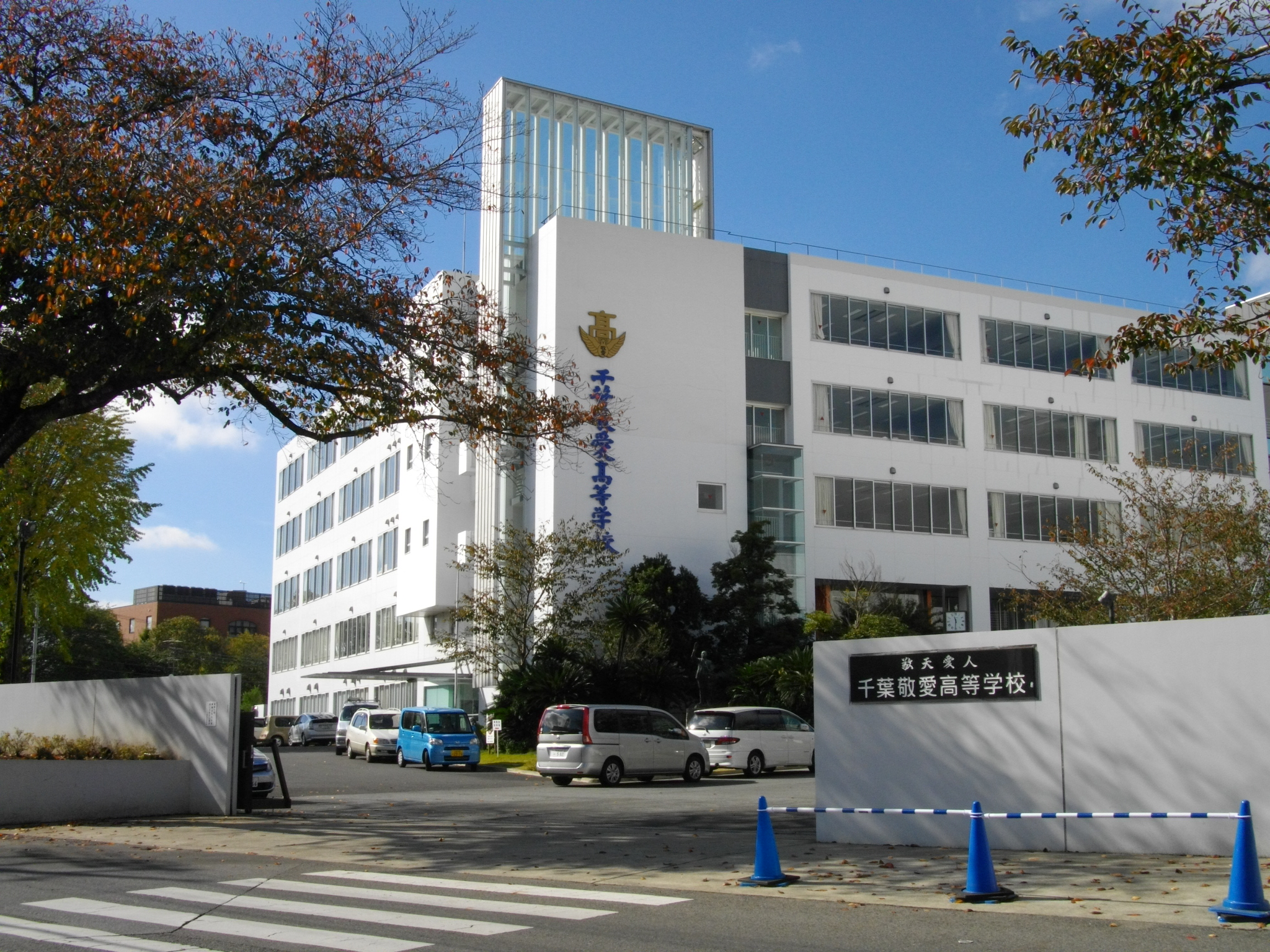
Chiba Keiai Senior High School

Chiba Keiai Senior High School (千葉敬愛高等学校, Chiba Keiai Kōtōgakkō) is a private senior high school in Yotsukaidō, Chiba Prefecture, Japan, in the Tokyo metropolitan area.

It originated from the April 1925 establishment of the Kanto Junior High School. On March 31, 1948, the governor of Chiba Prefecture approved the creation of Chiba Kanto High School, which changed its name to Chiba Keiai on July 8, 1958, and moved to its current location on April 8, 1964.
