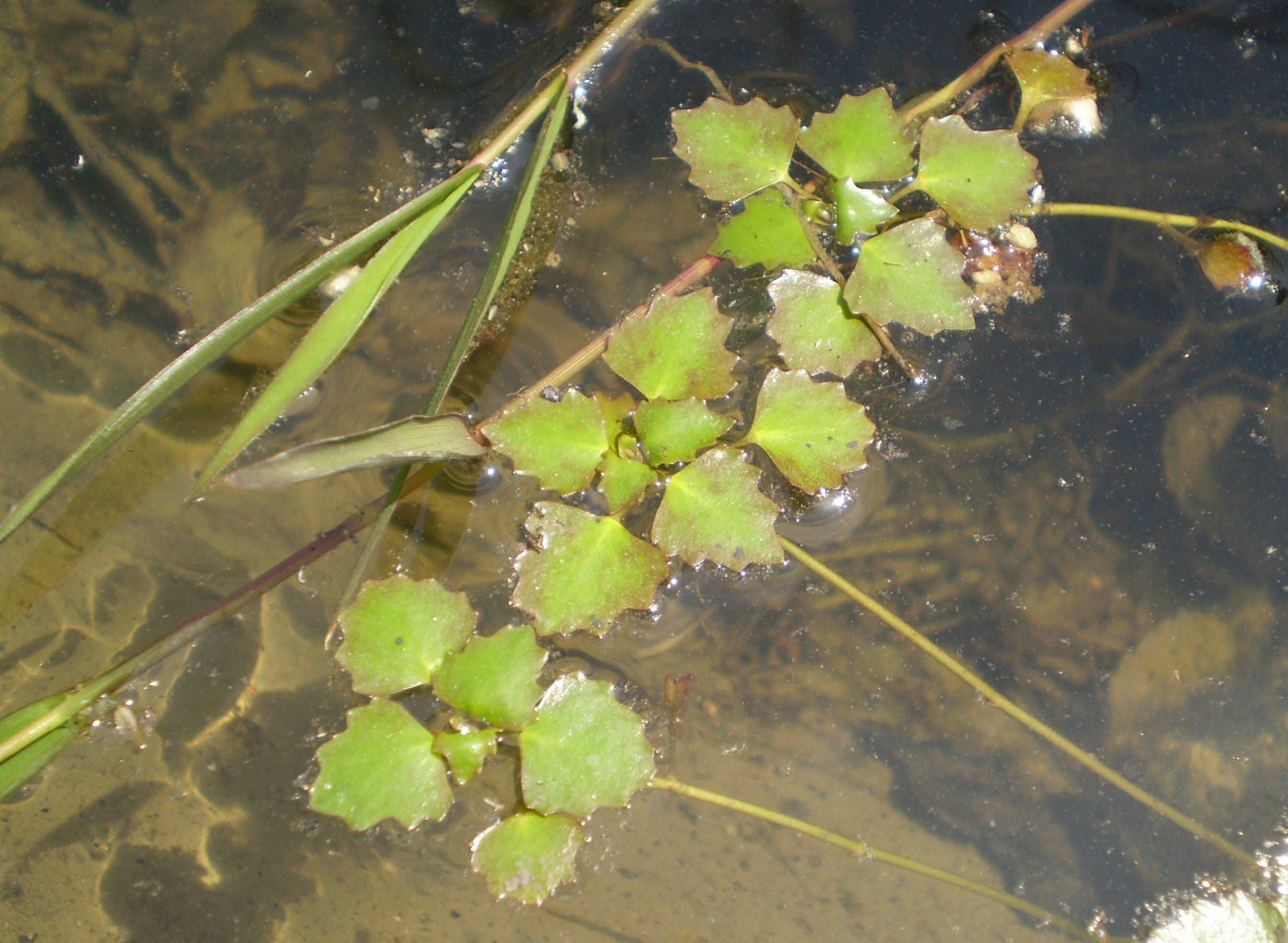
- Trapa incisa

Scientific classification
- Kingdom: Plantae
- Clade: Embryophytes
- Clade: Tracheophytes
- Clade: Spermatophytes
- Clade: Angiosperms
- Clade: Eudicots
- Clade: Rosids
- Order: Myrtales
- Family: Lythraceae
- Subfamily: Trapoideae; Voigt
- Genus: Trapa; L.

Type species
- Trapa natans L.

= Trapa =

Genus of aquatic plants

Trapa is a genus of floating annual aquatic plants in the Lythraceae family. A well-known species in the genus is Trapa natans, grown as a food crop in China and the Indian subcontinent.

Trapa was formerly placed in the separate family Trapaceae. However, molecular phylogenetic studies have recovered Trapa as the sister group of Sonneratia, with the clade comprising these two genera sister to a clade comprising Lagerstroemia and Duabanga. This four-genus clade is deeply nested within Lythraceae, and the APG system therefore includes Trapa in Lythraceae.

== Evolution ==
=== Fossil record ===
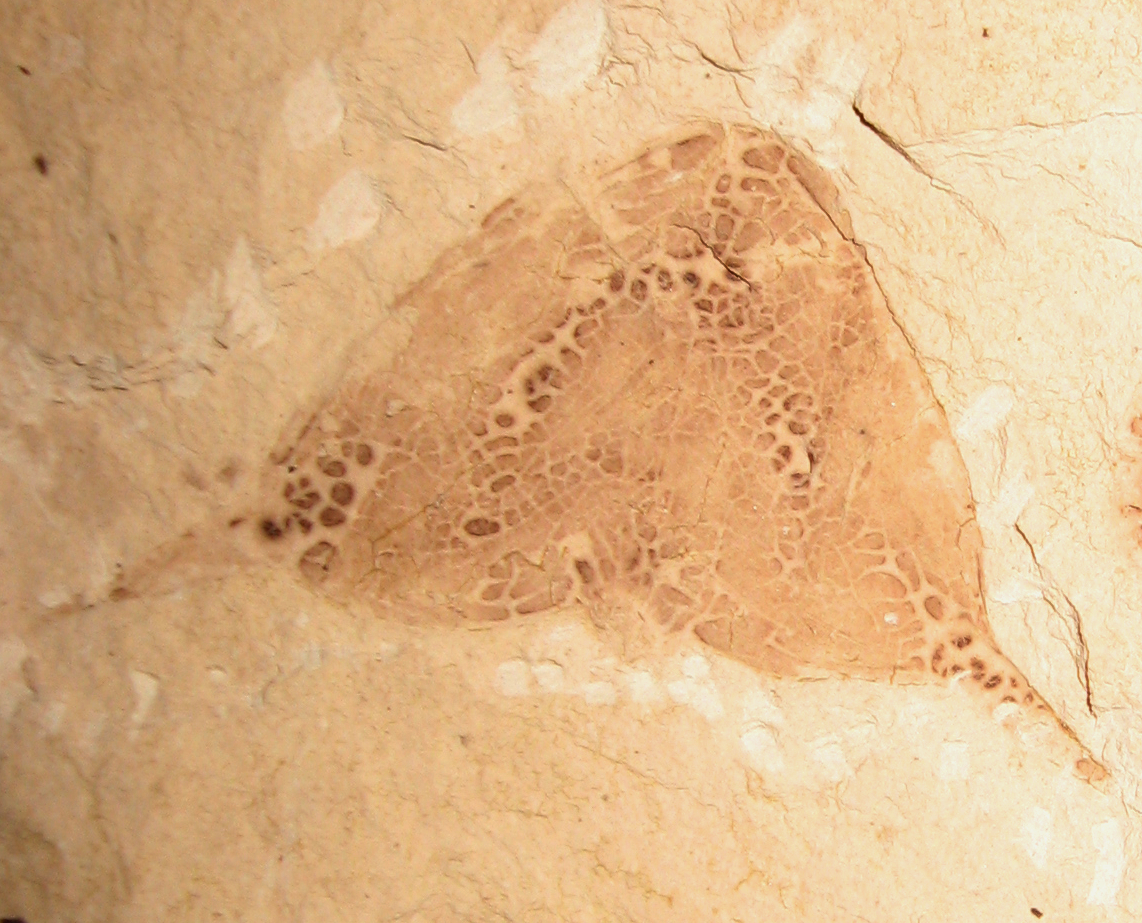
Trapa americana, Latah Formation, North America

The genus Trapa has an extensive fossil record, with numerous, distinctive species. Undisputed fossilized seeds have been found in Cenozoic strata starting from the Eocene throughout Europe, China and North America (though the genus became extinct in North America prior to the Pleistocene). The oldest known fossils attributed to the genus are of leaves from Cretaceous Alaska, referred to the species, T. borealis.

=== Taxonomy ===
The genus Trapa and its type species T. natans were named by the Swedish botanist Carl Linnaeus in his Species Plantarum in 1753. The generic name Trapa is derived from a late Latin word for a caltrop, calcitrappa, an area denial weapon. The specific name natans is the Latin for swimming or floating, from the verb nato, "I swim". As of 2023, there are eight recognised species, T. assamica, T. hankensis, T. hyrcana, T. incisa, T. kashmirensis, T. kozhevnikoviorum , T. natans, and T. nedoluzhkoi.
