= Katori Sea =

Vanished inland sea, Japan

Katori Sea 香取海
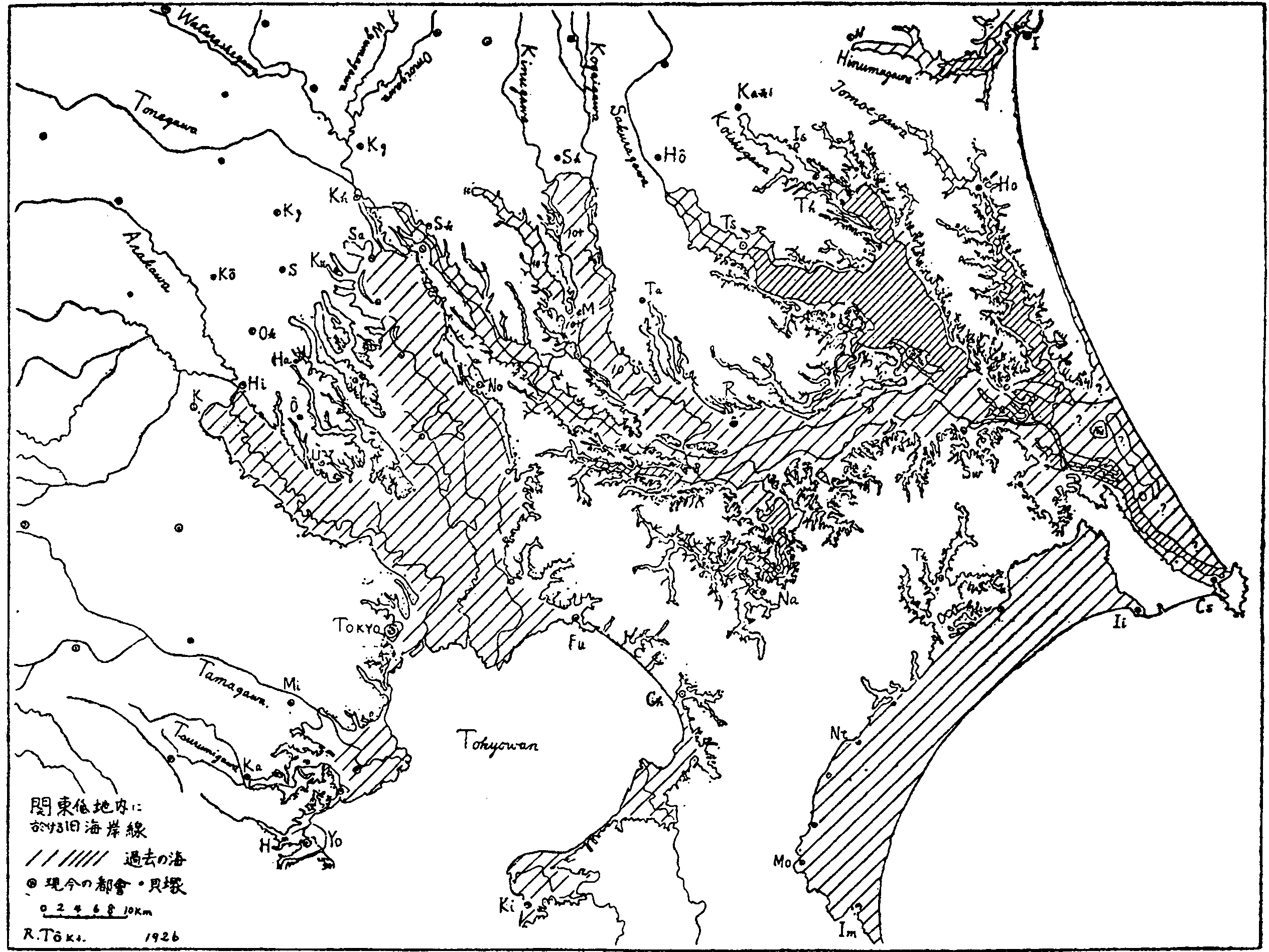
- Map of the Kantō Plain from the early 20th century with the Jōmon period (Holocene glacial retreat) area (shaded area) superimposed. The diagonal line around Lake Kasumigaura is the Katori Sea.

- Location within Japan
- Location: Japan
- Coordinates: 36°2′25″N 140°23′39″E
- Type: Inland sea
- River sources: Kinu River and others.
- Ocean/sea sources: Pacific Ocean

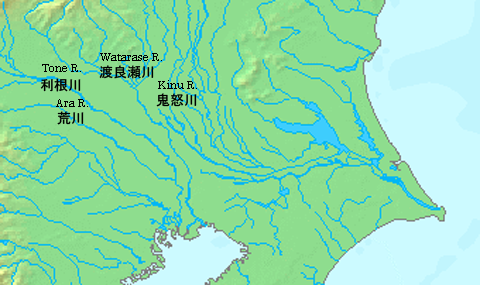
Kantō Plain in the 16th century, showing the Tone River discharging into the Tokyo Bay.

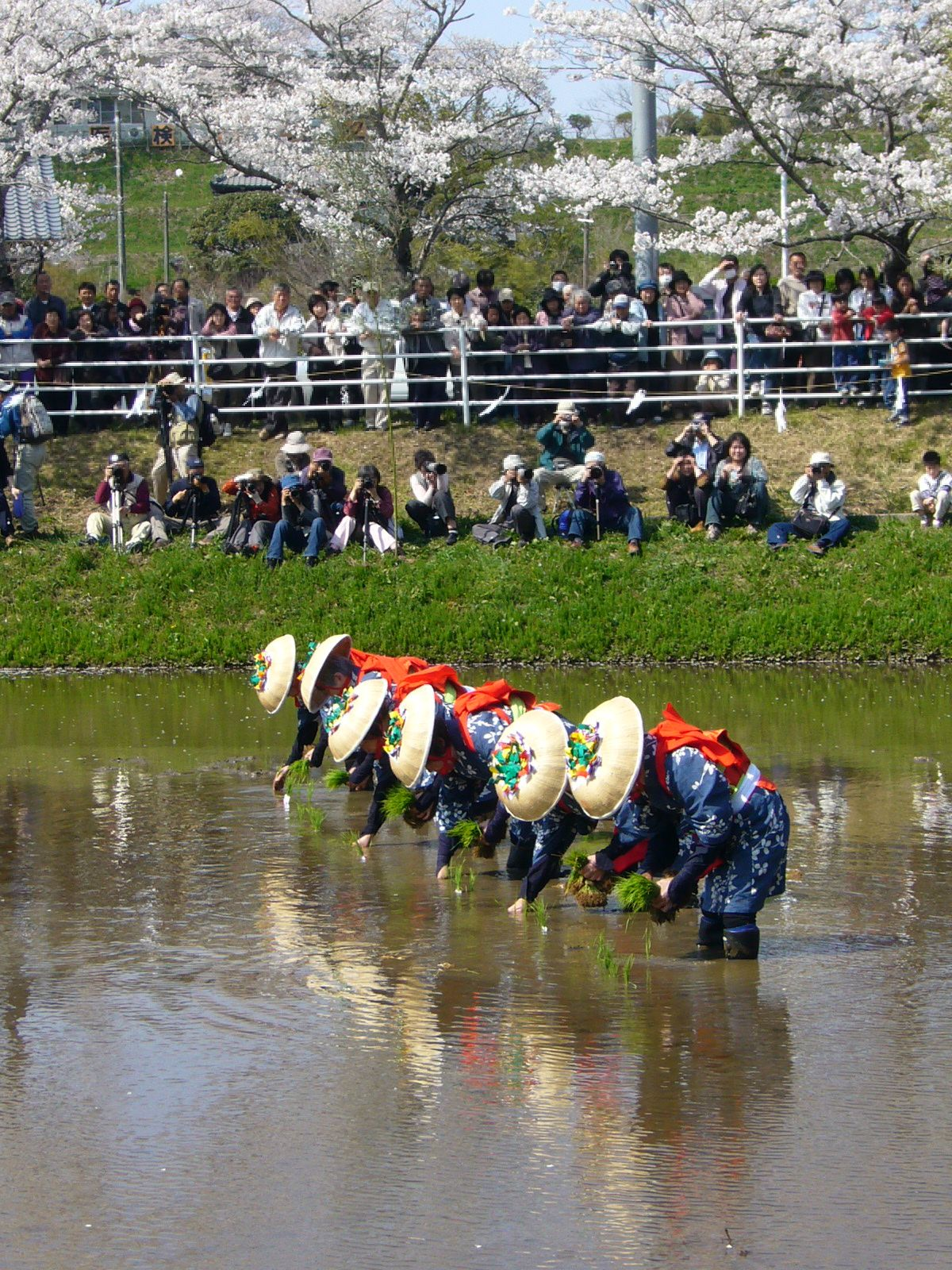
Rice transplanting Festival in Katori Shrine, Katori City

The Katori Sea (香取海, Katori no Umi) refers to the vanished inland sea formerly located in the eastern part of the ancient Kantō Plain connected to the Pacific Ocean, between the prefectures of Ibaraki and Chiba in Japan.

== Inland sea ==
In the Jōmon period part of the Kantō Plain was covered by the sea, due to the Holocene glacial retreat, which peaked about 6,000 years ago.

After thousands of years the land rose and the sea receded, and in the Yayoi period and the Kofun period much of the area was covered by wetlands, lakes and lagoons.

Over the centuries the sea decreased in size, a further cause of which was the deposition of volcanic ash from the nearby mountains and around Kantō. The volcanic ash fell in great quantity, and was also carried by the wind, by the rain, spilled into the rivers, from where it reached the Katori Sea and the Pacific Ocean. Additionally the sediments and rocks that flowed in the rivers influenced the decrease in size of the Katori.

Later the Lake Kasumigaura was formed from the remains of the inland sea.

== Edo Period ==
During the Tokugawa Shogunate in the Edo period, because of the food situation in Edo City, the recovery and development of the flooded lands and the sea became necessary, so the Tone River project was carried out. The Tone River originally discharged into the Tokyo Bay, but was diverted to flow into the Pacific Ocean (Kashima-nada); the courses of the rivers in this area were adequate to channel any overflow and avoid large floods. Lake Katori disappeared, and the desalination began of the lakes and lagoons that it left behind. The project encouraged canal farming, and irrigation was actively developed.

== Present ==
The remains of the inland sea are present in the Nishiura, Kitaura and Sotonasakaura lakes of the Kasumigaura and in the Teganuma and Inbanuma lagoons.

== See also ==
Suigō-Tsukuba Quasi-National Park
