= Inba District =

District in Chiba prefecture, Japan

Coordinates: 35.824°N 140.256°E

Yellow: The towns and villages of Inba District between 2002 and 2010

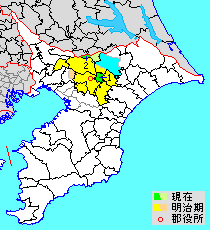
The maximum extent of Inba District between 1897 (merger of Shimo-Habu District into Inba) and 1954 (establishment of Sakura City and Narita City) within Chiba (white), with 21st century municipal borders overlaid. Blue and light green: Shimo-Habu-gun=Lower Habu District Green: present-day remainder of Inba Red circle: seat of the modern (1878–1926) district government Orange: ceded from Inba to Chiba District (Yachiyo Town) in 1954

Inba District (印旛郡, Inba-gun) is a district located in Chiba Prefecture, Japan.

As of 2011, the district has an estimated population of 43,480 and a density of 845 persons per km^{2}. The total area is 51.48 km^{2}.

There are two towns within the district.

- Sakae
- Shisui

== District timeline ==
- January 1, 1957 - Parts of Yotsukaidō merged into the city of Sakura.
- September 1, 1964 - The village of Shiroi gained town status.
- April 1, 1981 - The town of Yotsukaidō gained city status.
- April 1, 1985 - The village of Tomisato gained town status.
- April 1, 1992 - The town of Yachimata gained city status.
- April 1, 1996 - The town of Inzai gained city status.
- April 1, 2001 - The town of Shiroi gained city status.
- April 1, 2002 - The town of Tomisato gained city status.
- March 23, 2010 - The villages of Inba and Motono merged into the city of Inzai.
