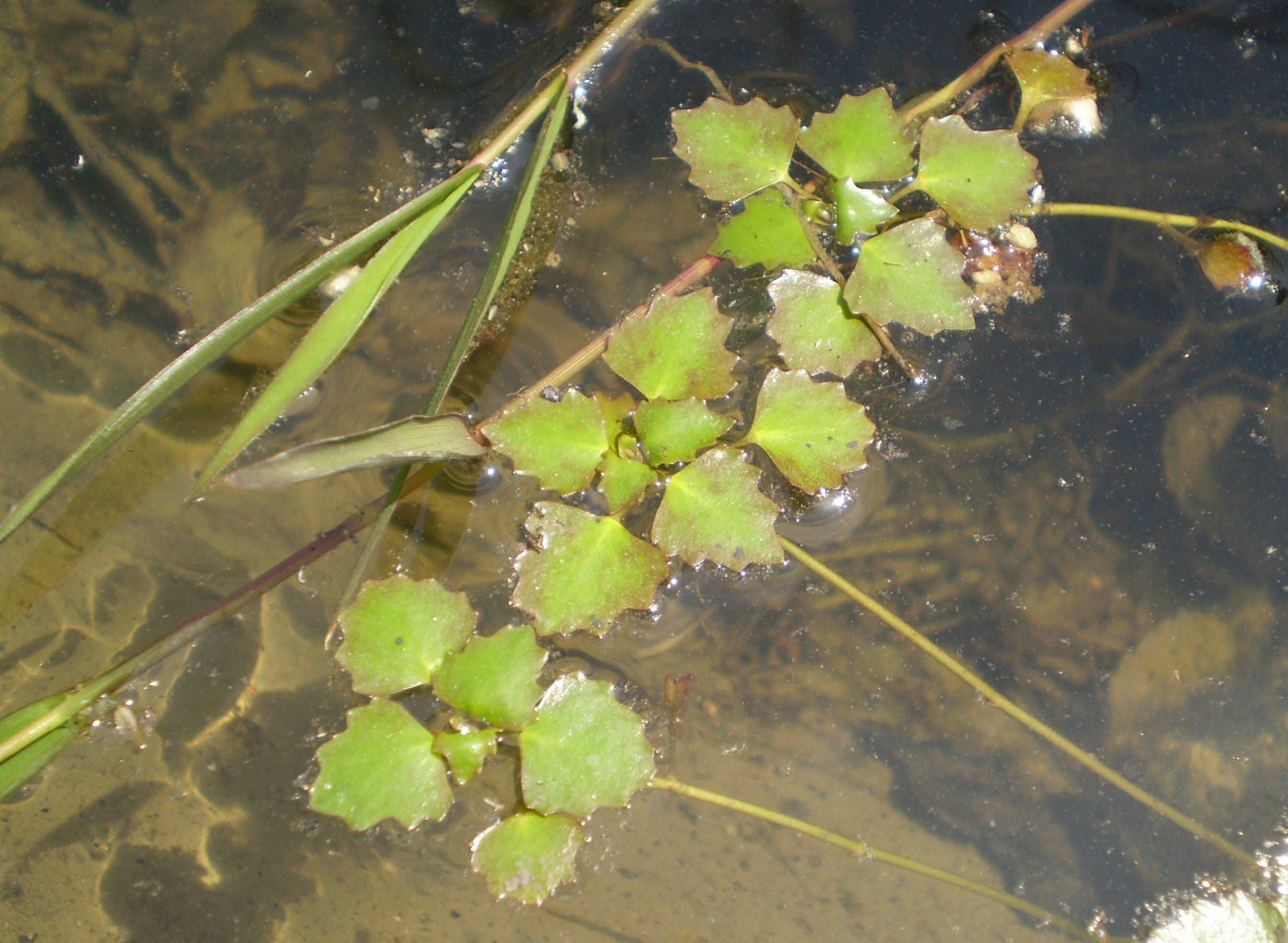
- Floating leaves
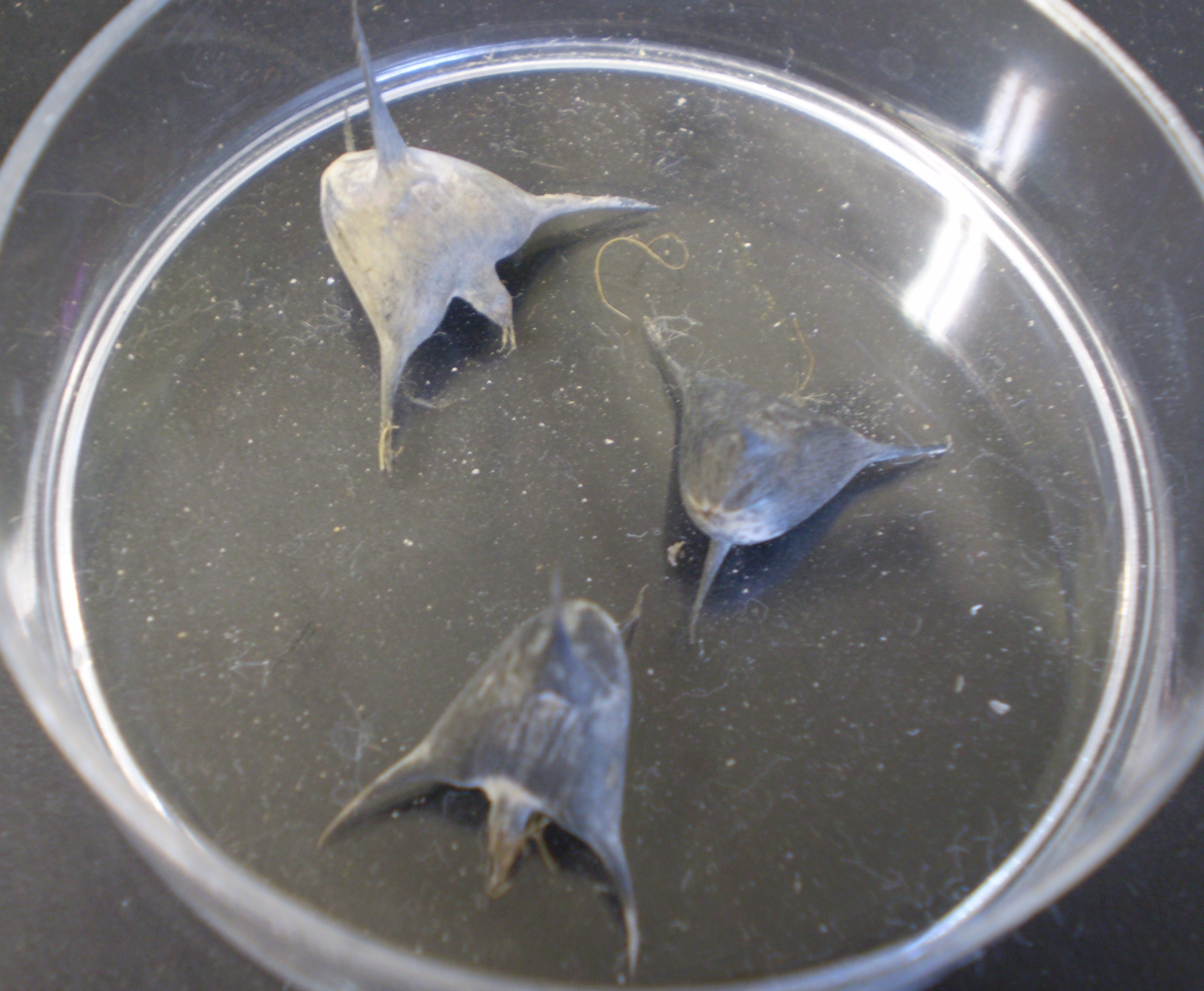
- Nuts in a bowl

Conservation status
- Least Concern (IUCN 3.1)

Scientific classification
- Kingdom: Plantae
- Clade: Tracheophytes
- Clade: Angiosperms
- Clade: Eudicots
- Clade: Rosids
- Order: Myrtales
- Family: Lythraceae
- Genus: Trapa
- Species: T. incisa

Binomial name
- Trapa incisa Siebold & Zucc.

Synonyms
- Trapa bispinosa var. incisa (Siebold & Zucc.) Franch. & Sav.; Trapa incisa var. pubescens Z.F.Yin, L.Yong Sun & Z.Jiang; Trapa maximowiczii var. tonkinensis Gagnep.; Trapa natans var. incisa (Siebold & Zucc.) Makino

= Trapa incisa =

Species of plant

Trapa incisa, the tiny water-chestnut, is a widespread species of flowering plant in the family Lythraceae. It is native to subtropical areas of northeastern India, Southeast Asia, eastern China, Korea, Japan, and the Russian Far East. A hydrosubshrub, it is typically found in freshwater ponds and swamps from sea level to 2,000 m (6,600 ft). Its chromosome number is 2n = 48, with reports of 88, 90, 92, and perhaps 96. It has been assessed as Least Concern.
