= Inzai-Makinohara Station =

Railway station in Inzai, Chiba Prefecture, Japan

HS13 Inzai-Makinohara Station 印西牧の原駅
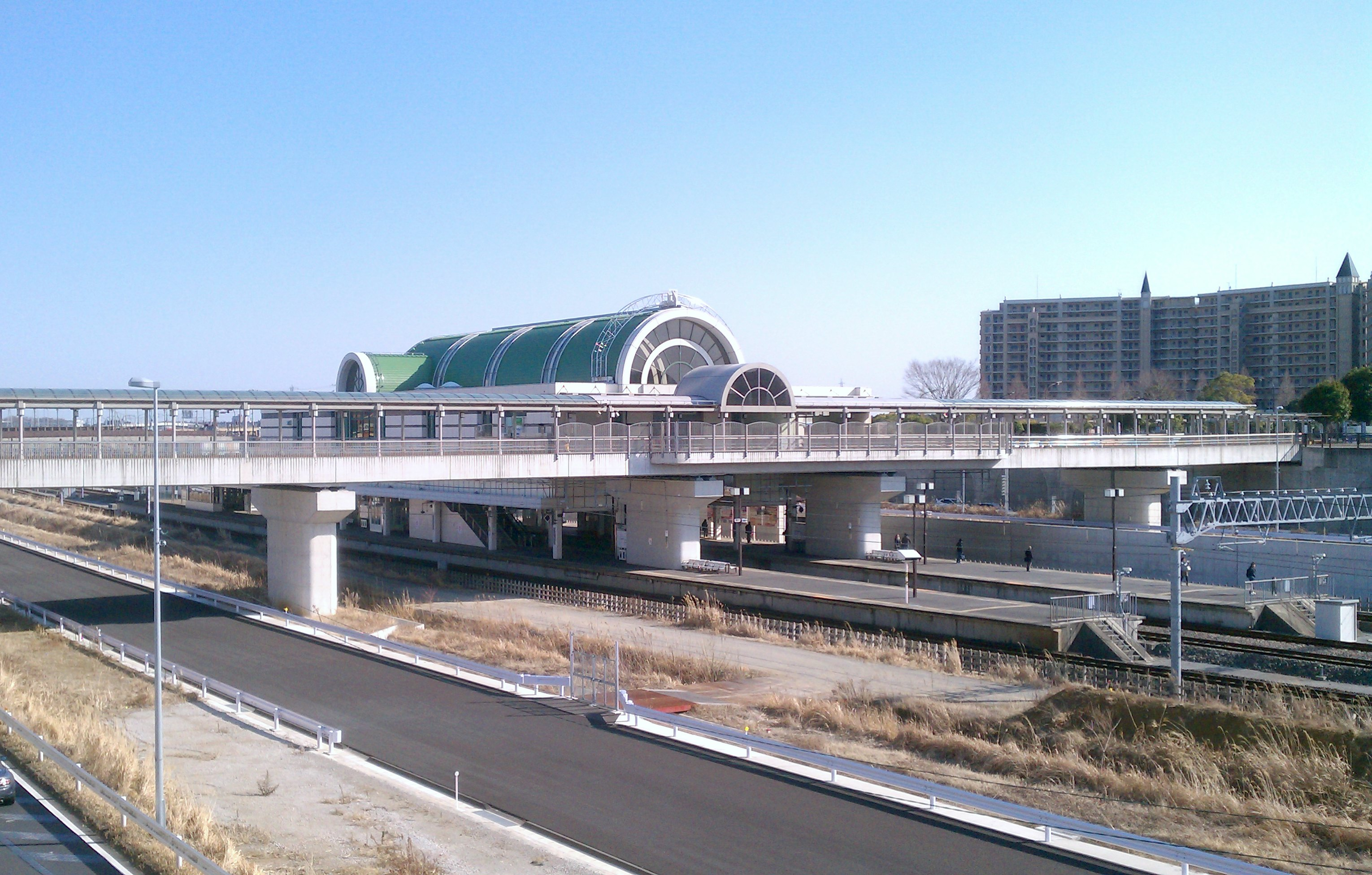
- Inzai-Makinohara Station, February 2013

General information
- Location: 1-2191 Hara, Inzai-shi, Chiba-ken; Japan
- Coordinates: 35°48′12.98″N 140°10′0.93″E
- Operator: Hokusō Railway
- Line: Hokusō Line
- Platforms: 2 island platforms

Other information
- Status: Staffed
- Station code: HS13
- Website: Official website

History
- Opened: 1 April 1995

Passengers
- FY2018: 14,410

Services
Preceding station	Hokusō Railway	Following station
Chiba New Town Chūō HS12 towards Keisei Takasago	Hokusō Line Limited Express Local	Imba Nihon-idai HS14 Terminus
Location
- Location within Chiba Prefecture Location within Japan

Inzai-Makinohara Station (印西牧の原駅, Inzai-Makinohara-eki) is a passenger railway station in the city of Inzai, Chiba Prefecture, Japan, operated by the third-sector railway operator Hokusō Railway.

== Lines ==
Inzai-Makinohara Station is served by the Hokusō Line and is located 28.5 kilometers from the terminus of the line at Keisei-Takasago.

== Station layout ==
This station consists of two ground-level island platforms serving four tracks, with an elevated station building located above to one side.

=== Platforms ===
1, 2	■ Hokusō Line	for Higashi-Matsudo, Shin-Kamagaya , Keisei-Takasago, Oshiage, Ueno, Shinagawa, and Haneda Airport Domestic Terminal
3, 4	■ Hokusō Line	for Imba Nihon-idai, and Narita Airport

== History ==
Inzai-Makinohara Station was opened on 1 April 1995. On 17 July 2010 a station numbering system was introduced to the Hokusō Line, with the station designated HS13.

== Passenger statistics ==
In fiscal 2018, the station was used by an average of 14,410 passengers daily.

== Surrounding area ==
- Chiba New Town

== See also ==
- List of railway stations in Japan
