= Shiroi =

Shiroi 白井市
- City
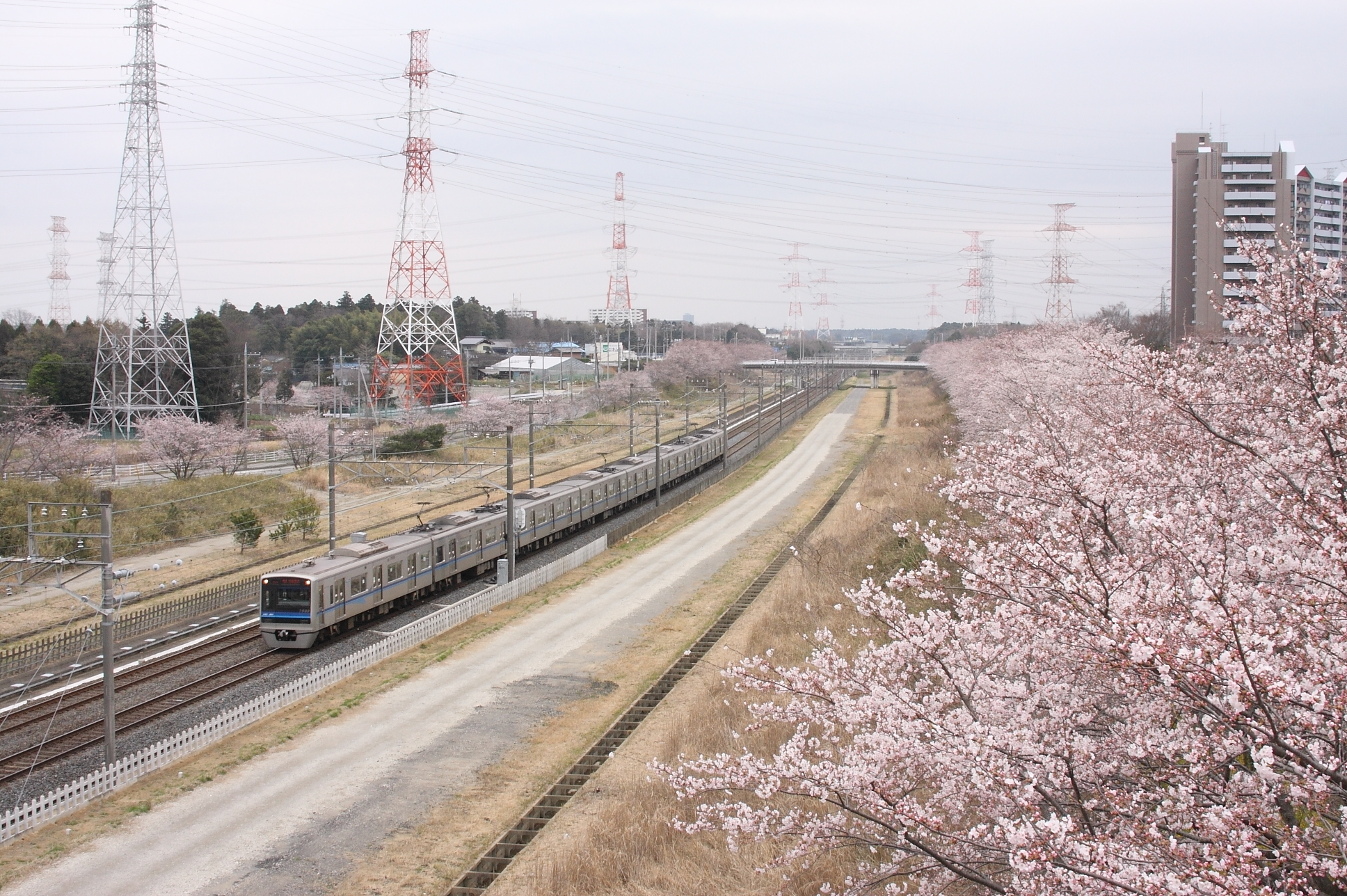
- Hokuso Line

- Flag Emblem

- Location of Shiroi in Chiba Prefecture

- Coordinates: 35°47′29.3″N 140°3′22.7″E
- Country: Japan
- Region: Kantō
- Prefecture: Chiba

Government
  - Mayor: Fumio Izawa

Area
  - Total: 35.48 km^{2} (13.70 sq mi)

Population (November 1, 2020)
  - Total: 63,190
  - Density: 1,781/km^{2} (4,613/sq mi)
- Time zone: UTC+9 (Japan Standard Time)
- Tree: Castanopsis
- Flower: Satsuki azalea
- Bird: Meadow bunting
- Phone number: 047-492-1111
- Address: 1123 Fuku, Shiroi-shi, Chiba-ken 270-1492
- Website: Official website

Shiroi (白井市, Shiroi-shi) is a city located in Chiba Prefecture, Japan. As of 1 November 2020, the city had an estimated population of 63,190 in 26,204 households and a population density of 1800 persons per km². The total area of the city is 35.48 square kilometres (13.70 sq mi). The name of the city comes from the word for "white" in Japanese, 白い。

== Geography ==
Shiroi is located in northwestern Chiba Prefecture, with an elevation of 20 to 30 meters above sea level. It is approximately equidistant from central Tokyo (25 kilometers) and the prefectural capital at Chiba. The city is bordered by Lake Tega to the north.

=== Neighboring municipalities ===
Chiba Prefecture

- Funabashi
- Inzai
- Kamagaya
- Kashiwa
- Yachiyo

=== Climate ===
Shiroi has a humid subtropical climate (Köppen Cfa) characterized by warm summers and cool winters with light to no snowfall. The average annual temperature in Shiroi is 14.8 °C. The average annual rainfall is 1371 mm with September as the wettest month. The temperatures are highest on average in August, at around 26.6 °C, and lowest in January, at around 4.2 °C.

== Demographics ==
Per Japanese census data, the population of Shiroi has recently plateaued after several decades of strong growth.

Historical population
Year	Pop.	±%
1950	8,402	—
1960	8,217	−2.2%
1970	10,509	+27.9%
1980	24,974	+137.6%
1990	37,082	+48.5%
2000	50,431	+36.0%
2010	60,353	+19.7%
2020	62,441	+3.5%

== History ==
Shiroi Village was created within Inba District, Chiba Prefecture on April 1, 1885 with the early Meiji period establishment of the modern municipalities system. From shortly after World War II until the early 1960s Shiroi was the site of a United States Air Force Base (Shiroi AFB APO73). Shiroi was elevated to town status on September 1, 1964. As the Japanese economy grew in the 1970s, many people moved from the country to the cities, and the growth of Tokyo sent many residents out to suburbs in the Kantō countryside. Shiroi's real growth began during this period: its rail connection to Chiba city was completed in 1979, and it was linked directly to the Tokyo railway network in 1991. Shiroi was elevated to city status on April 1, 2001.

== Government ==
Shiroi has a mayor-council form of government with a directly elected mayor and a unicameral city council of 21 members. Shiroi contributes one member to the Chiba Prefectural Assembly. In terms of national politics, the city is part of Chiba 13th district of the lower house of the Diet of Japan.

== Economy ==
Shiroi is a regional commercial center and a bedroom community for nearby Chiba and Tokyo. During the Meiji period, Shiroi became a fruit-growing area. Local farmers planted kiwifruit and grapes, but the most famous of Shiroi's fruits turned out to be nashi pears. In the springtime, the pear trees still bloom alongside the sakura.

== Education ==
Shiroi has nine public elementary schools and five public middle schools operated by the city government, and one public high school operated by the Chiba Prefectural Board of Education.

== Transportation ==
=== Railway ===
Hokusō Railway Company - Hokusō Line

- Nishi-Shiroi - Shiroi

=== Highway ===
- National Route 16
- National Route 464

== Sister cities ==
- Shire of Campaspe, Victoria, Australia

== Local attractions ==
- Lake Tega

== Noted people from Shiroi ==
- Akihiro Hyodo- professional soccer player
