= Yotsukaidō =

Yotsukaidō 四街道市
- City
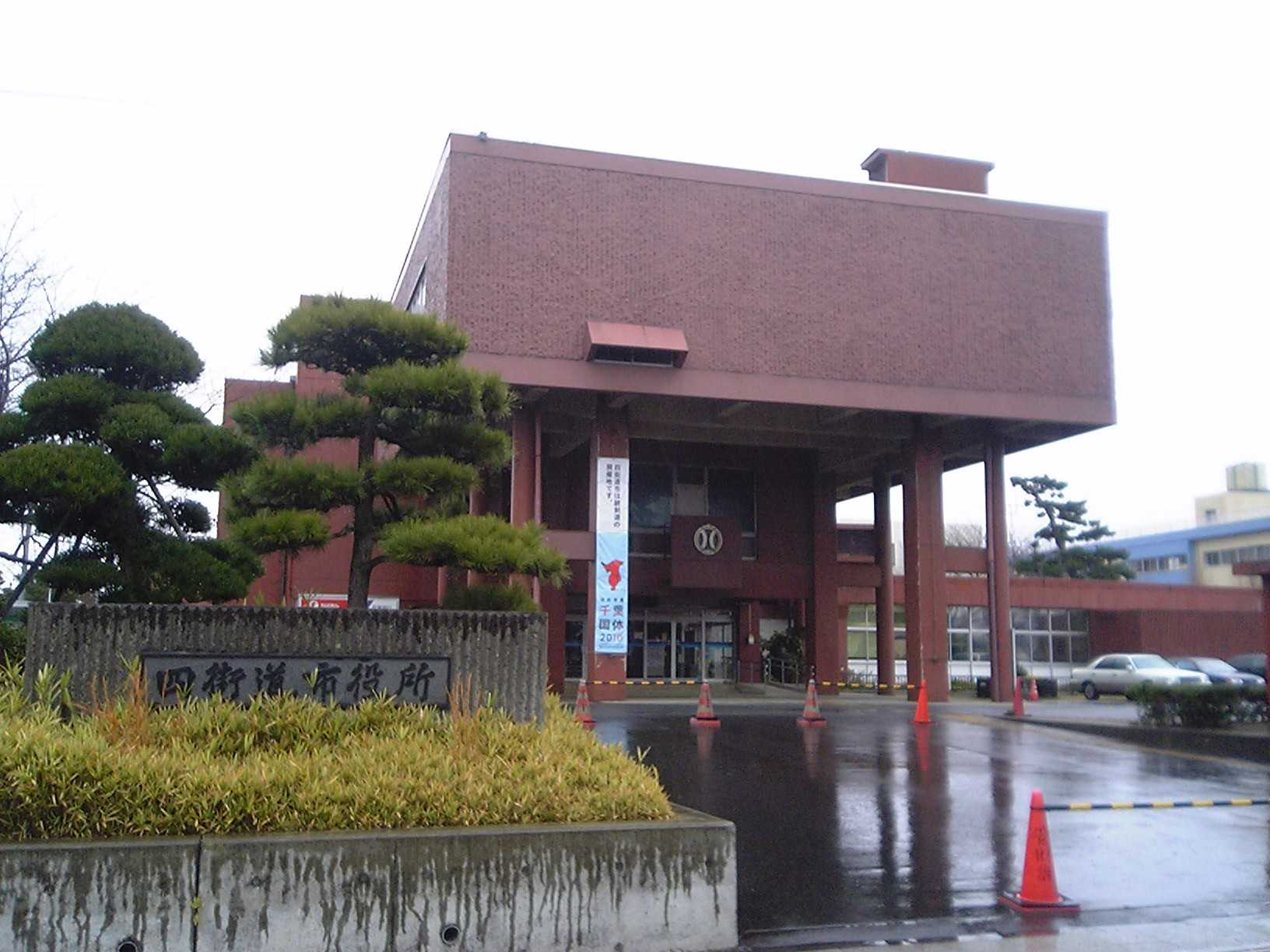
- Yotsukaidō City Hall

- Flag Seal

- Location of Yotsukaidō in Chiba Prefecture

- Coordinates: 35°40′11.2″N 140°10′4.6″E
- Country: Japan
- Region: Kantō
- Prefecture: Chiba

Government
  - Mayor: Hitoshi Sado (since February 2010)

Area
  - Total: 34.52 km^{2} (13.33 sq mi)

Population (December 1, 2020)
  - Total: 95,266
  - Density: 2,760/km^{2} (7,148/sq mi)
- Time zone: UTC+9 (Japan Standard Time)
- -Tree: Sakura
- Flower: Primrose
- Phone number: 043-421-2111
- Address: Shikawatashi, Yotsukaidō-shi, Chiba-ken 284-8555
- Website: Official website

Yotsukaidō (四街道市, Yotsukaidō-shi) is a city located in Chiba Prefecture, Japan. As of 1 November 2020, the city had an estimated population of 95,266 in 43,191 households and a population density of 2800 persons per km^{2}. The total area of the city is 34.52 square kilometres (13.33 sq mi).

== Geography ==
Located inland on the Shimosa Plateau in north-central part of Chiba Prefecture, Yotsukaidō borders the prefectural capital of Chiba to the south and west. Kashima River in the Tone River system runs north to Lake Inba on the eastern edge of the city.

=== Neighboring municipalities ===
Chiba Prefecture

- Hanamigawa-ku
- Inage-ku
- Sakura
- Wakaba-ku

=== Climate ===
Yotsukaidō has a humid subtropical climate (Köppen Cfa) characterized by warm summers and cool winters with light to no snowfall. The average annual temperature in Yotsukaidō is 15.0 °C. The average annual rainfall is 1431 mm with September as the wettest month. The temperatures are highest on average in August, at around 26.4 °C, and lowest in January, at around 4.7 °C.

== Demographics ==
Per Japanese census data, the population of Yotsukaidō has grown rapidly over the past 60 years. Yotsukaidō is home to almost 1,000 Afghans, which makes it the largest foreign population in Yotsukaidō and the Japanese city with largest Afghan community.

Historical population
Year	Pop.	±%
1960	16,623	—
1970	26,375	+58.7%
1980	59,236	+124.6%
1990	72,157	+21.8%
2000	82,552	+14.4%
2010	86,726	+5.1%
2020	93,576	+7.9%

== History ==
Yotsukaidō was inhabited by the Mononobe clan in ancient Japan, from whose name the Monoi region of the city is derived. In the Heian and Kamakura periods, it was under the control of shōen ruled by the Chiba clan for over 600 years. During the Edo period, portions were ruled by the Sakura Domain, and portions were tenryō under the direct control of the Tokugawa shogunate . After the Meiji Restoration, the villages of Chiyoda and Asahi were founded on April 1, 1889 within Inba District, Chiba Prefecture with the creation of them modern municipalities system. However, much of the area of these villages was already under the control of the Imperial Japanese Army, which had established a field artillery training school in 1886. The artillery school remained an active military installation until 1945. Chiyoda was elevated to town status on December 23, 1940, and merged with Asahi Village on March 10, 1955 to form Yotsukaidō Town. Yotsukaidō was elevated to city status on April 1, 1981. Proposals to merge the city into neighboring Chiba were rejected by public referendum in 2003 and 2004.

== Government ==
Yotsukaidō has a mayor-council form of government with a directly elected mayor and a unicameral city council of 20 members. Yotsukaidō contributes two members to the Chiba Prefectural Assembly. In terms of national politics, the city is part of Chiba 9th district of the lower house of the Diet of Japan.

== Economy ==
Yotsukaidō is a regional commercial center and a bedroom community for nearby Chiba and Tokyo. The largest industry within the city borders is a large food processing facility operated by Yakult.

== Education ==
- Aikoku Gakuen University
- Yotsukaidō has 12 public elementary schools and five public middle schools operated by the city government, and two public high schools operated by the Chiba Prefectural Board of Education. There are also two private high schools. The prefecture also operates two special education school for the handicapped.

Public high schools:

- Chiba Prefectural Yotsukaidō High School (千葉県立四街道高等学校)
- Chiba Prefectural Yotsukaidō North High School (千葉県立四街道北高等学校)

Private high schools:

- Aikoku Gakuen Yotsukaidō High School (愛国学園大学附属四街道高等学校)
- Chiba Keiai Senior High School

== Transportation ==
=== Railway ===
JR East – Sōbu Main Line

- Yotsukaidō - Monoi

=== Highway ===
- Higashi-Kantō Expressway
- National Route 51

== Notable people ==
- Yusuke Kobori, professional boxer
- Kazuo Shii, Japan Communist Party chairman
- Kodai Watanabe, professional soccer player

== Sister cities ==
- Livermore, California, United States, since April 19, 1977
