= Lake Tega =

Lake in Japan

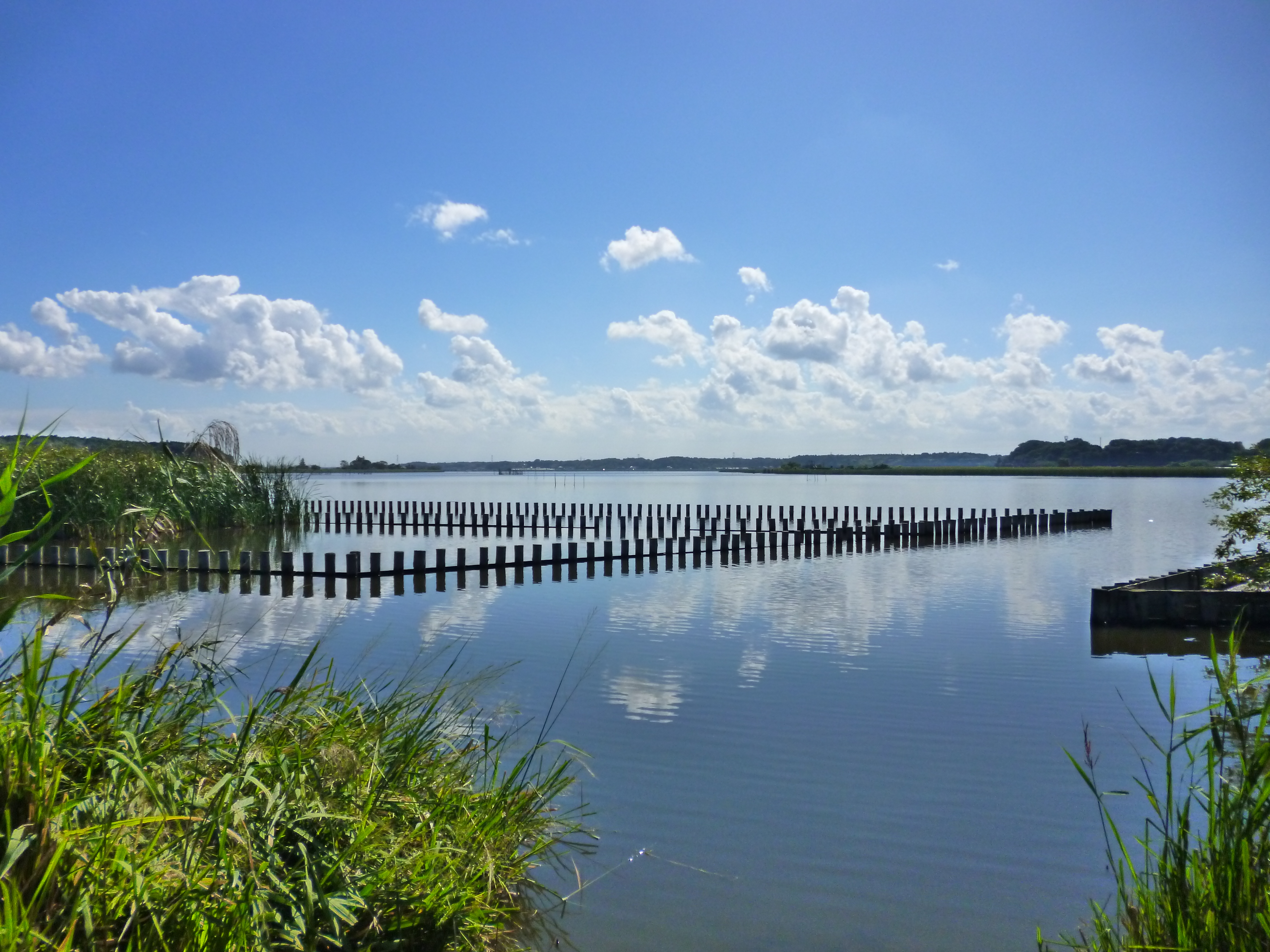

- Location within Japan
- Coordinates: 35°51′24″N 140°01′54″E
- Primary inflows: Ōhori River, Ōtsu River
- Primary outflows: Tone River
- Basin countries: Japan
- Surface area: 6.5 km^{2} (2.5 sq mi)
- Max. depth: 3.8 m (12 ft)
- Surface elevation: 0 m (0 ft)

Lake Tega (手賀沼, Tega-numa) is a lake located in the Chiba Prefecture of Japan, northeast of Tokyo.

== Geography ==
=== Location ===
Lake Tega is located entirely in the northwest of Chiba Prefecture, on the main island of Japan: Honshū. As the crow flies, it is about 21.5 kilometres (13.4 mi) north of Tokyo Bay, and 32 km (20 mi) north East of Tokyo Metropolitan Area.

=== Topography ===
Lake Tega has a total area of 6.5 km^{2} (2.5 sq mi) for a perimeter of 38 km (24 mi). Its average depth is 0.86 m (2 ft 10 in) and its maximum depth of 3.8 m (12 ft). It has the distinction of being composed of two bodies of water: Lake (main) Tega and Lake Shimotega, a watercourse of the watershed of the Tone River.

== See also ==
- Lake Inba
