= Chiba New Town =

Residential development in Chiba Prefecture, Japan

The Chiba New Town development was launched in the 1960s by the government of Chiba Prefecture in Japan and is located in the northern part of the prefecture. It includes parts of the cities of Funabashi, Shiroi, and Inzai. With an original target population of over 300,000 people, over 2900 ha, it was intended to be self-sustaining. The scale has since been reduced to 1900 ha, and the target population (now 147,000) has not been reached. It is served by train lines connecting to Tokyo and Narita Airport.
