= Chiba Prefecture =

Prefecture of Japan

Coordinates: 35°36′18″N 140°07′24″E

Chiba Prefecture 千葉県
- Prefecture

Japanese transcription(s)
  - Japanese: 千葉県
  - Rōmaji: Chiba-ken
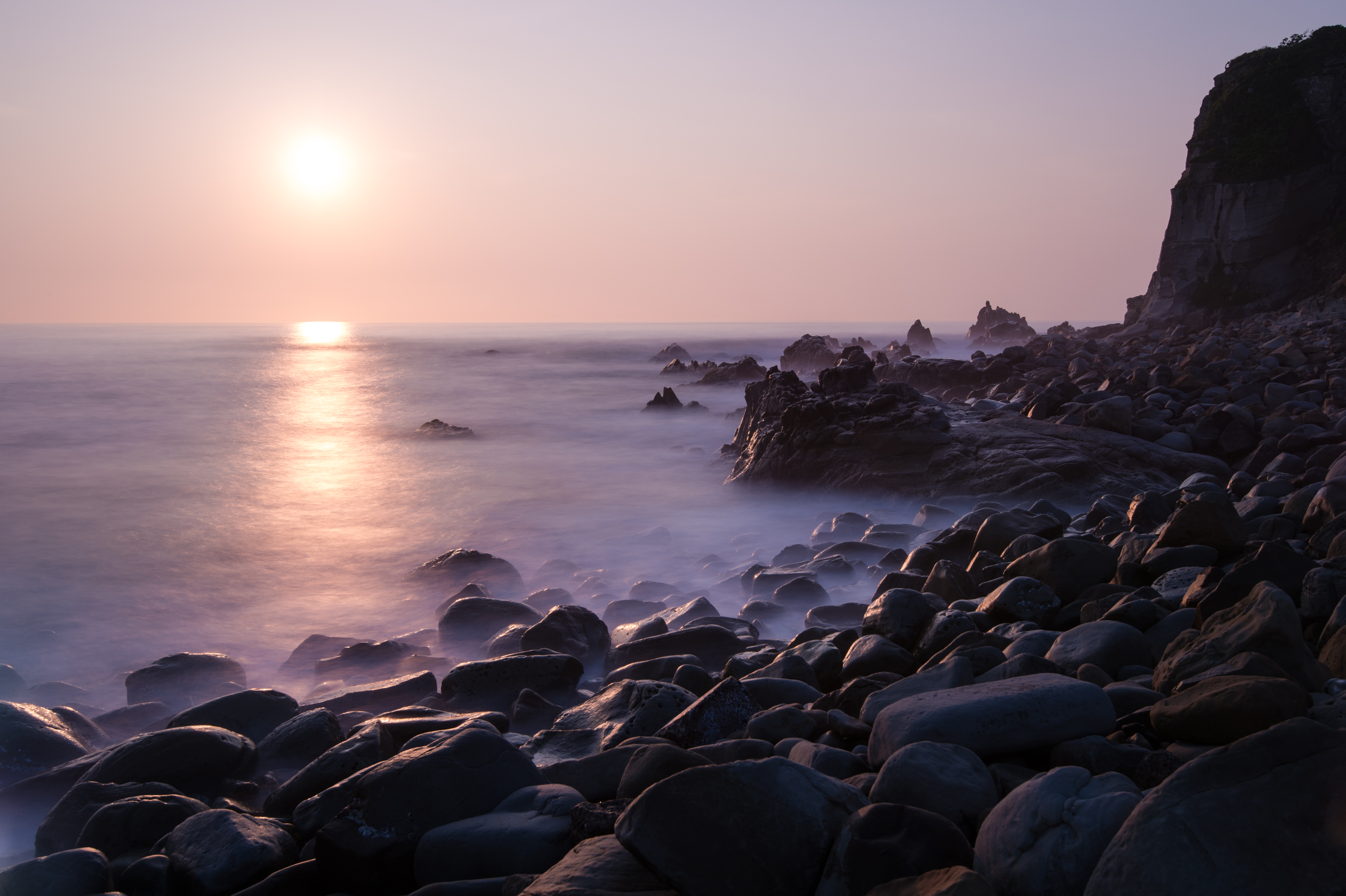
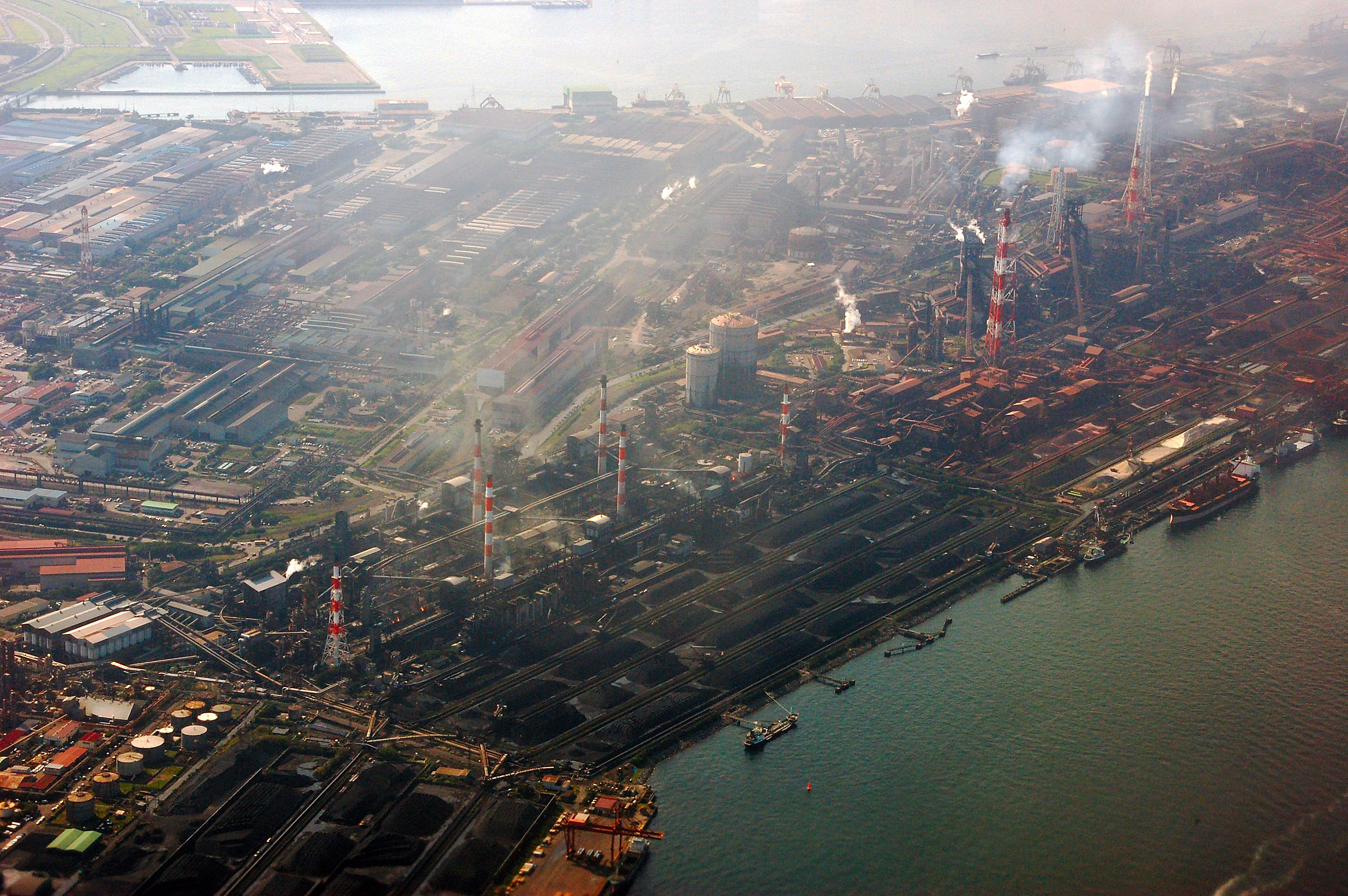
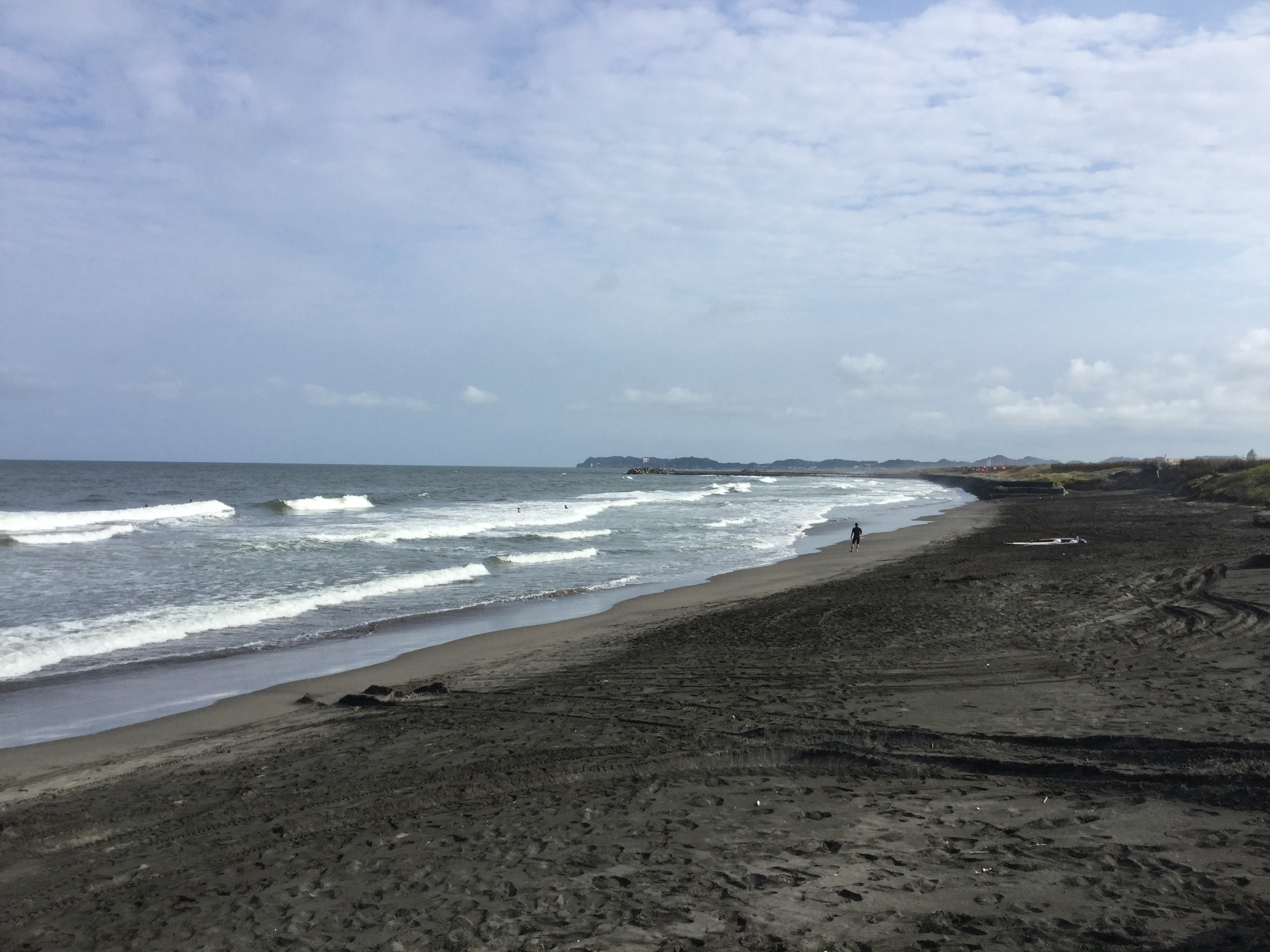
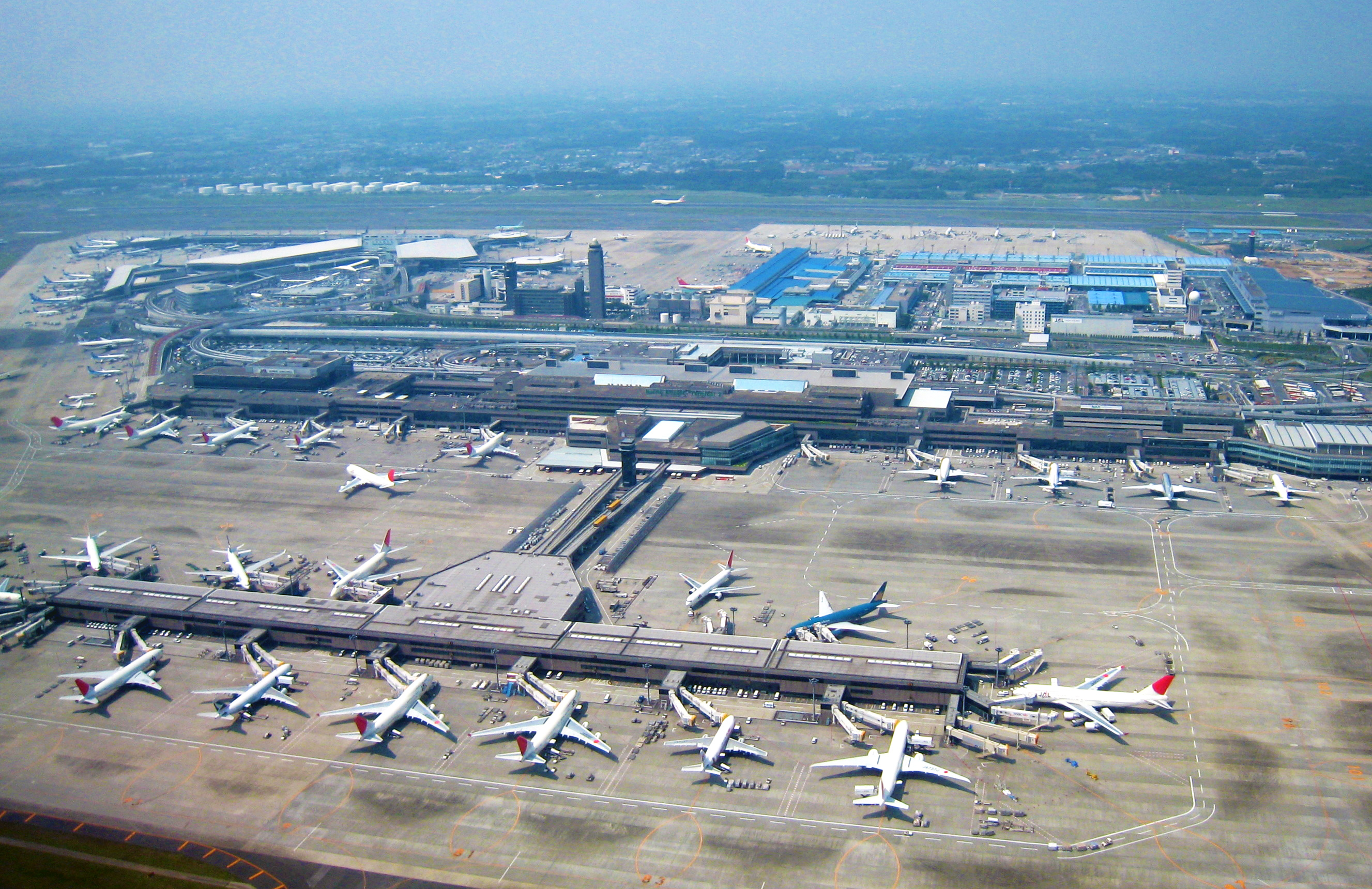
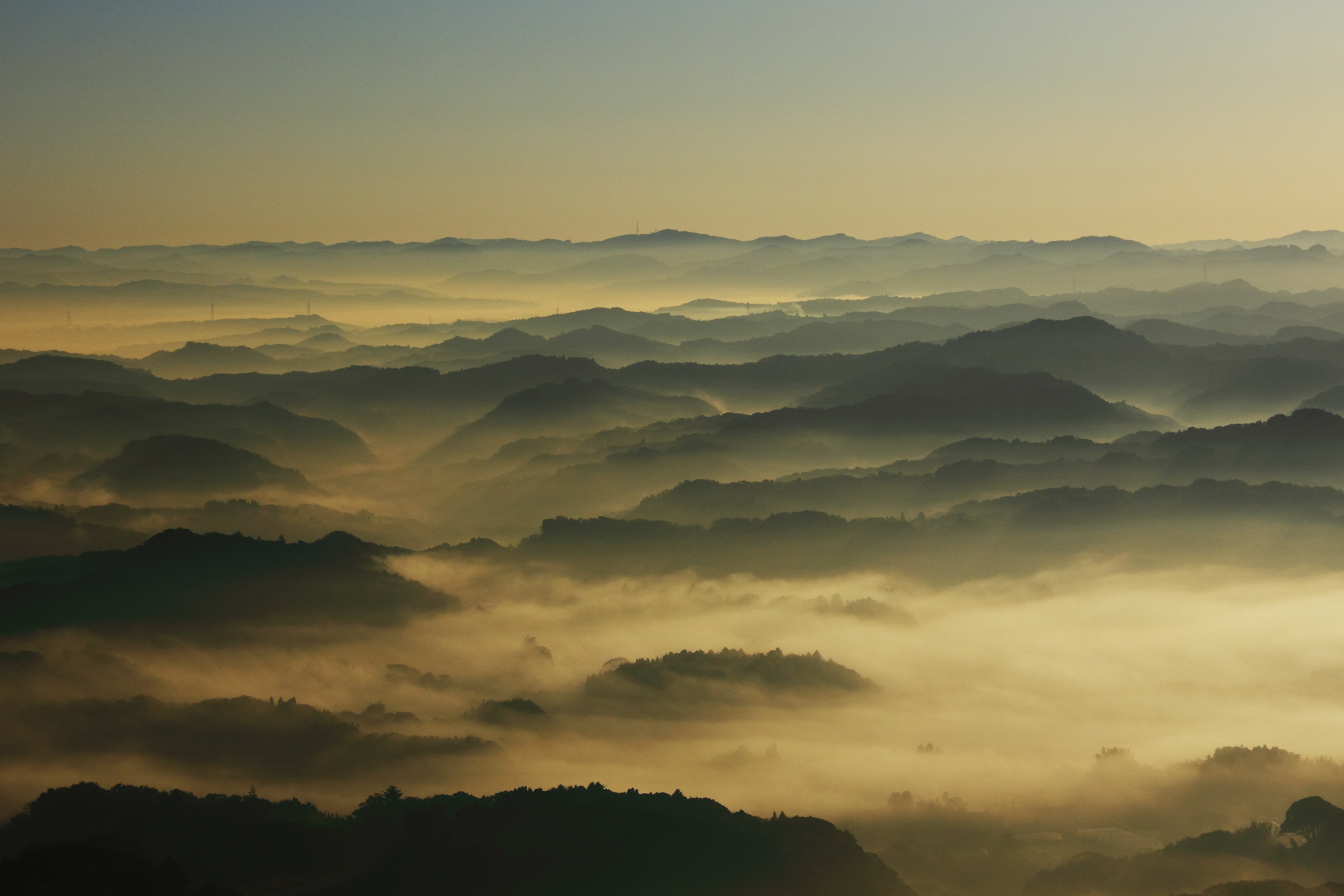
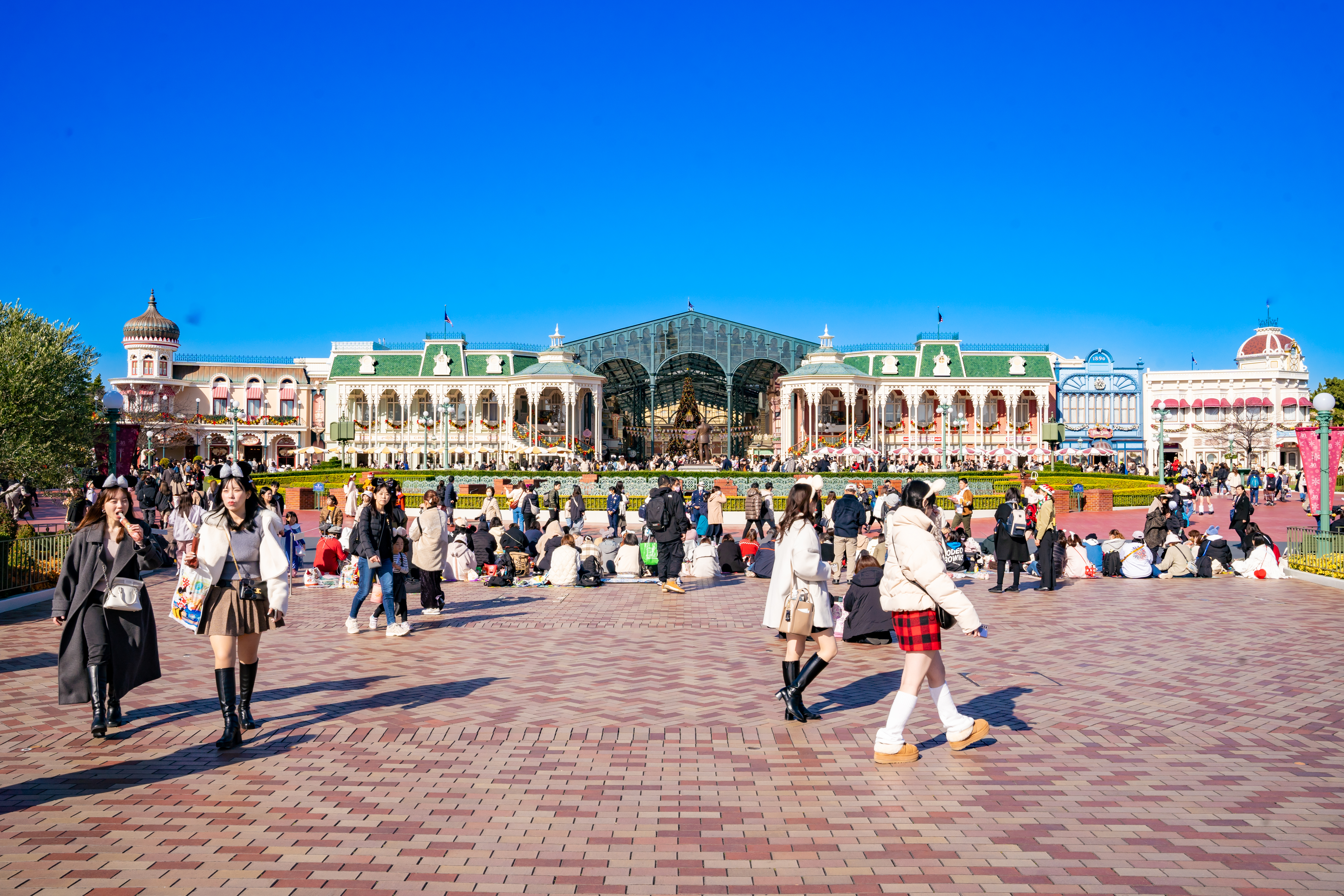
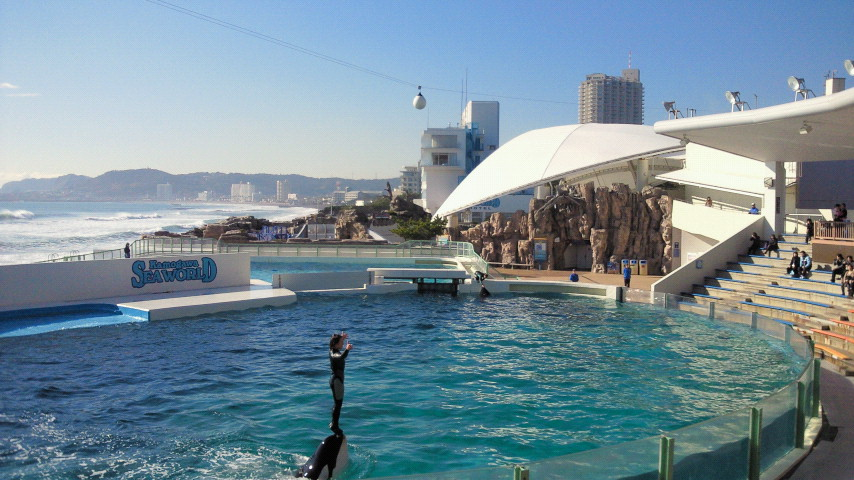
- Cape Inubō Keiyō Industrial Zone Kujūkuri Beach Narita International Airport Minami Bōsō Quasi-National Park Tokyo Disneyland Kamogawa Sea World

- Flag Symbol
- Anthem: Chiba kenminka
- Country: Japan
- Region: Kantō
- Island: Honshu
- Capital: Chiba
- Subdivisions: Districts: 6, Municipalities: 54

Government
  - Governor: Toshihito Kumagai (from April 2021)

Area
  - Total: 5,157.61 km^{2} (1,991.36 sq mi)
  - Rank: 28th

Population (July 1, 2025)
  - Total: 6,278,017
  - Rank: 6th
  - Density: 1,217.23/km^{2} (3,152.62/sq mi)

GDP
  - Total: JP¥ 21,414 billion US$ 158.1 billion (2022)
- ISO 3166 code: JP-12
- Website: www.pref.chiba.lg.jp
- Symbols of Japan
- Bird: Meadow bunting
- Fish: Seabream
- Flower: Seiyō aburana blossom
- Tree: Kusamaki

Boso Peninsula

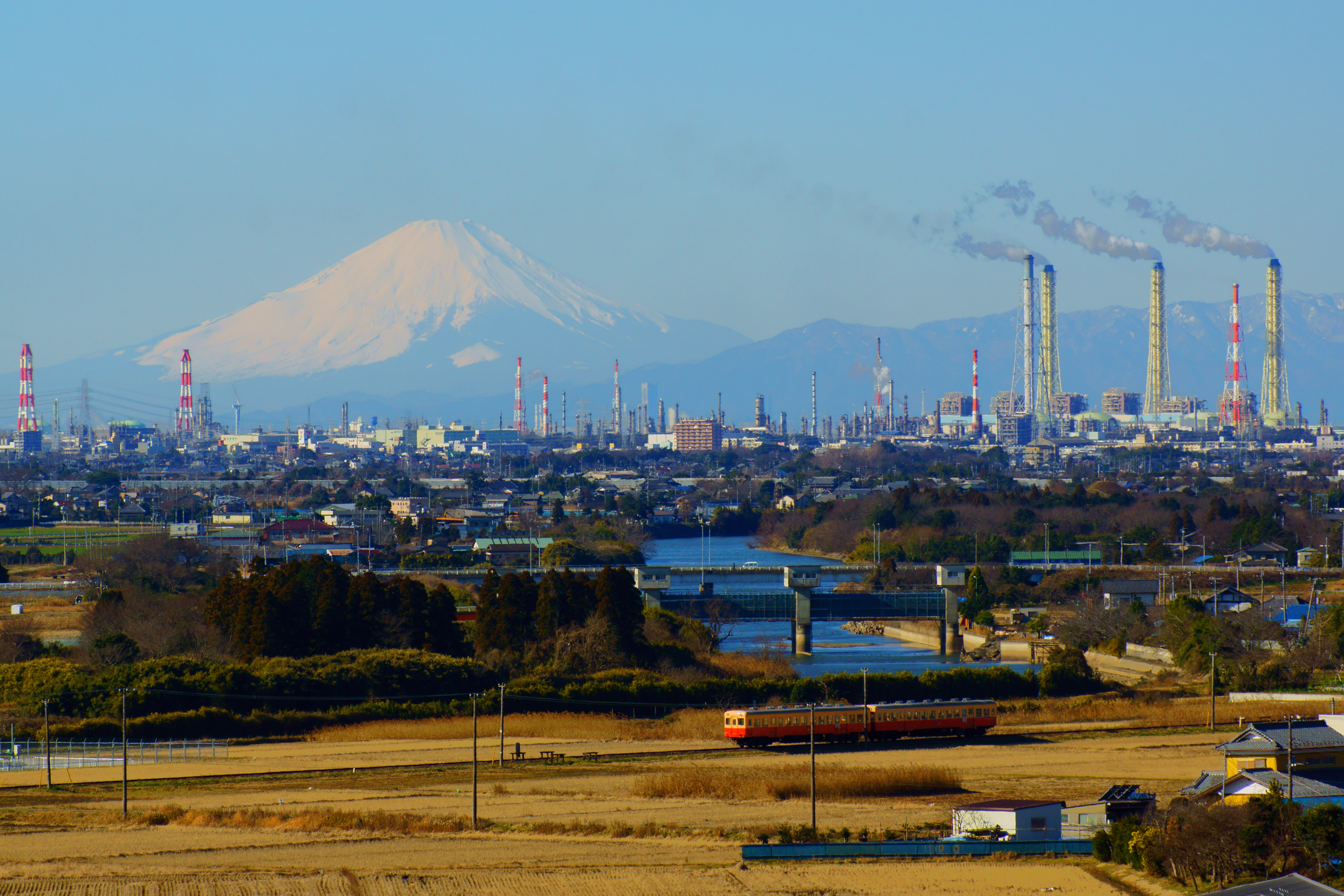
The Keiyō Industrial Zone, one of Japan's largest industrial complexes that spans the eight cities of Chiba Prefecture, and Mount Fuji on the horizon

Chiba Prefecture (千葉県, Chiba-ken; Japanese pronunciation: [c̟͡ɕí.bä̀, c̟͡ɕì.bä́(.kè̞ɴ̀)]) is a prefecture of Japan located in the Kantō region of Honshu. Chiba Prefecture has a population of 6,278,060 (1 June 2019) and has a geographic area of 5,157 km^{2} (1,991 sq mi). Chiba Prefecture borders Ibaraki Prefecture to the north, Saitama Prefecture to the northwest, and Tokyo to the west.

Chiba is the capital and largest city of Chiba Prefecture, with other major cities including Funabashi, Matsudo, Ichikawa and Kashiwa. Chiba Prefecture is located on Japan's eastern Pacific coast to the east of Tokyo, and is part of the Greater Tokyo Area, the most populous metropolitan area in the world. Chiba Prefecture largely consists of the Bōsō Peninsula, which encloses the eastern side of Tokyo Bay and separates it from Kanagawa Prefecture. Chiba Prefecture is home to Narita International Airport, the Tokyo Disney Resort, and the Keiyō Industrial Zone.

== Etymology ==
The name of Chiba Prefecture in Japanese is formed from two kanji characters. The first, 千, means "thousand" and the second, 葉 means "leaf". The name first appears as an ancient kuni no miyatsuko, or regional command office, as the Chiba Kuni no Miyatsuko (千葉国造). The name was adopted by a branch of the Taira clan, which moved to the area in present-day Chiba City in the late Heian period. The branch of the Taira adopted the name and became the Chiba clan, and held strong influence over the area of the prefecture until the Azuchi–Momoyama period. The name "Chiba" was chosen for the prefecture at the time its creation in 1873 by the Assembly of Prefectural Governors (地方官会議, Chihō Kankai Kaigi), an early Meiji-period body of prefectural governors that met to decide the structure of local and regional administration in Japan.

The compound word Keiyō (京葉), which refers to the Tokyo-Chiba region, is formed from the second character in Tokyo (京), and the second character in Chiba (葉), which can also be pronounced "kei" and "yō" respectively. This compound is used in terms such as the Keiyō Line, Keiyō Road, Keiyō Rinkai Railway Rinkai Main Line, and the Keiyō Industrial Zone.

== History ==
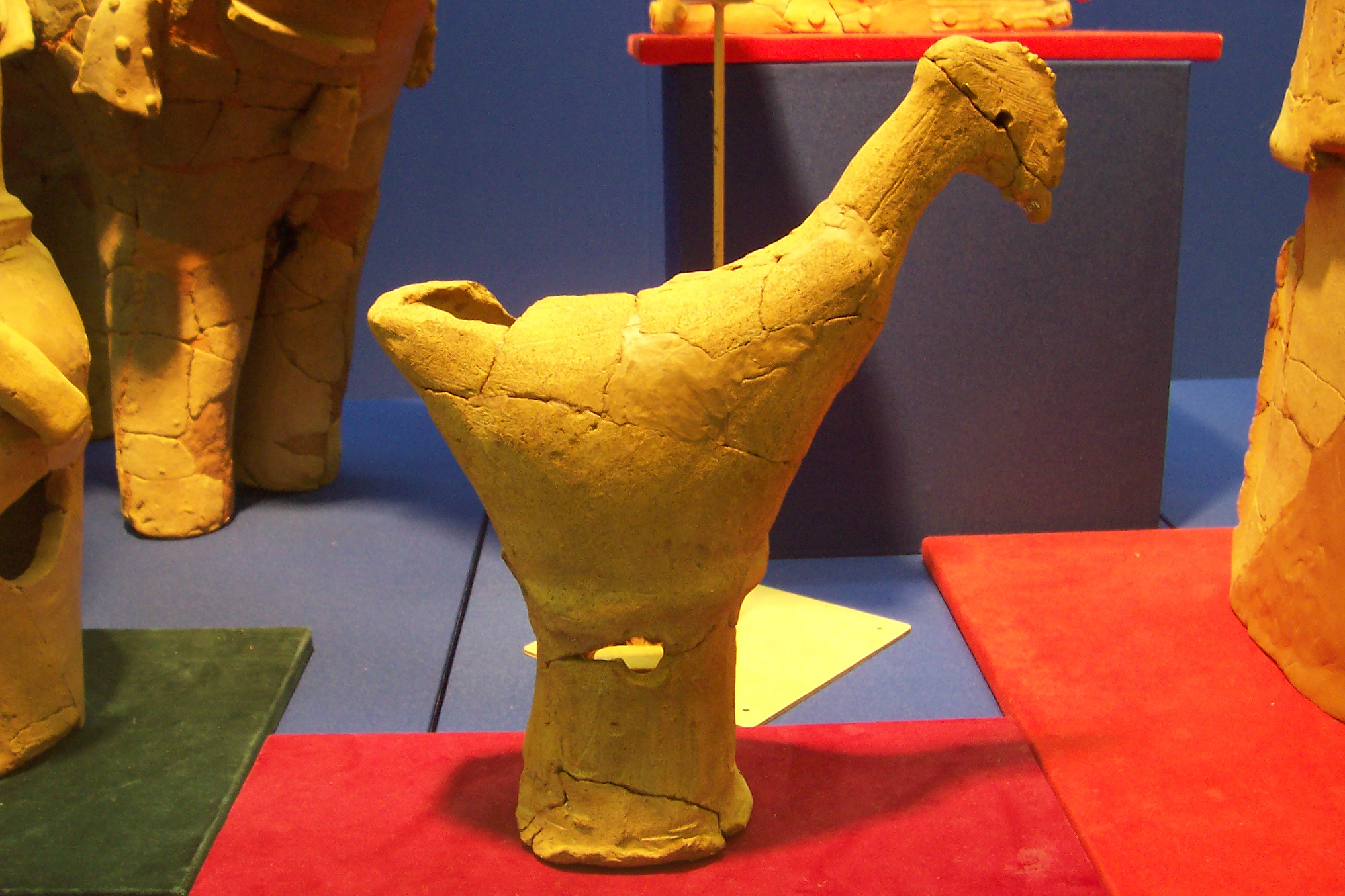
Haniwa funerary object of a chicken, Kofun period. From the collection of the Shibayama Haniwa Museum

Historical population
| Year | Pop. | ±% p.a. |
|---|---|---|
| 1890 | 1,191,353 | — |
| 1903 | 1,316,547 | +0.77% |
| 1913 | 1,401,587 | +0.63% |
| 1920 | 1,336,155 | −0.68% |
| 1925 | 1,399,257 | +0.93% |
| 1930 | 1,470,121 | +0.99% |
| 1935 | 1,546,394 | +1.02% |
| 1940 | 1,588,425 | +0.54% |
| 1945 | 1,966,862 | +4.37% |
| 1950 | 2,139,037 | +1.69% |
| 1955 | 2,205,060 | +0.61% |
| 1960 | 2,306,010 | +0.90% |
| 1965 | 2,701,770 | +3.22% |
| 1970 | 3,366,624 | +4.50% |
| 1975 | 4,149,147 | +4.27% |
| 1980 | 4,735,424 | +2.68% |
| 1985 | 5,148,163 | +1.69% |
| 1990 | 5,555,429 | +1.53% |
| 1995 | 5,797,782 | +0.86% |
| 2000 | 5,926,285 | +0.44% |
| 2005 | 6,056,462 | +0.44% |
| 2010 | 6,216,289 | +0.52% |
| 2015 | 6,222,666 | +0.02% |
| 2020 | 6,284,480 | +0.20% |

=== Early history ===
Chiba Prefecture was settled in prehistoric times, as evidenced by the Jōmon period remains in every part of the region. The prefecture holds the largest kaizuka sea shell mounds in Japan, evidence of a large population in the prefecture that relied on the rich marine products of the Pacific Ocean and Tokyo Bay. Kofun burial mounds are found across the prefecture, with the largest group being in Futtsu along Tokyo Bay.

=== Asuka and Nara periods ===
In the Asuka period (538–710), under the Taika Reform of 645, the administrative structure of present-day Chiba Prefecture changed significantly. The historical province of Fusa Province, which may have covered much of Chiba and Ibaraki prefectures, was divided into two provinces: Shimōsa Province (also called Shimofusa) in the north and Kazusa Province in the southern area. Awa Province at the south of Chiba Prefecture, was separated from Kazusa Prefecture in 718. These administrative units existed until they were abolished and merged into Chiba Prefecture after the Meiji Restoration. The central government established a kokubunji provincial temple in each province.

=== Heian period ===
The imperial court gradually extended its authority over the three provinces in the Nara (710–794) and Heian (794–1185) periods. Shōen feudal estates were established across the three provinces, and the region became an important source of tax revenue, sending agricultural and other products to the capital in Kyoto. As the Heian period progressed, however, the kokushi provincial governors came to exert military power independent of the central government in Kyoto. The Chiba clan broke entirely with the imperial court and was instrumental in the establishment of the Kamakura shogunate.

=== Modern period ===
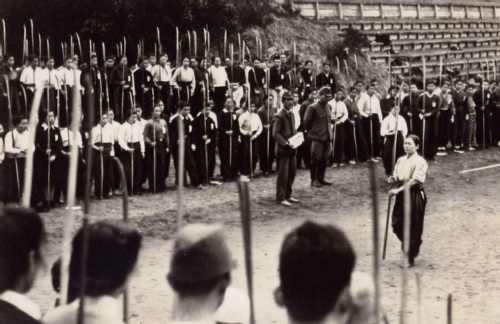
Student militia of the Japanese 52nd Army training on Kujūkuri Beach, early 1945

Chiba Prefecture was established on June 15, 1873, with the merger of Kisarazu Prefecture and Inba Prefecture.

The militarization of Chiba Prefecture dates to the Russo-Japanese War (1904–1905). Coastal fortifications were built along Tokyo Bay, as far south as Tateyama, to protect the capital of the Empire of Japan from attack.

In September 1923, the Great Kanto earthquake has cause of widespread destruction in Chiba Prefecture, most notably in the southernmost part of Boso Peninsula, where 1,300 residents were killed, out of 142,000 deaths. Areas of prefecture adjacent to Tokyo saw much damage, and mob violence against Koreans and other ethnic minorities occurred in the chaos after the earthquake in Funabashi, Ichikawa, and other areas.

Koreans, in several neighborhoods of Yachiyo, were killed, and a tower was erected in 1972 near Yachiyodai Station to memorialize those killed in the incident. In the 1930s, the north and central areas of the prefecture became a center of large-scale military production, and military bases and fortifications were constructed in most of the coastal areas of the prefecture. After the United States took control of Saipan, the northern part of the prefecture (most notably the cities of Chiba and Chōshi) was firebombed. Much of the industrialized north of the prefecture was destroyed. Operation Coronet, one of two parts of Operation Downfall, was the planned land invasion of Tokyo in March 1946 by the United States. Coronet planned Kujūkuri Beach as one of two initial landing bases, the other being Hiratsuka via Sagami Bay. The U.S. First Army would enter at Kujūkuri, sweep across the Boso Peninsula, and meet the U.S. Eighth Army at Tokyo. The plan was not carried out since Japan surrendered after the atomic bombings of Hiroshima and Nagasaki.

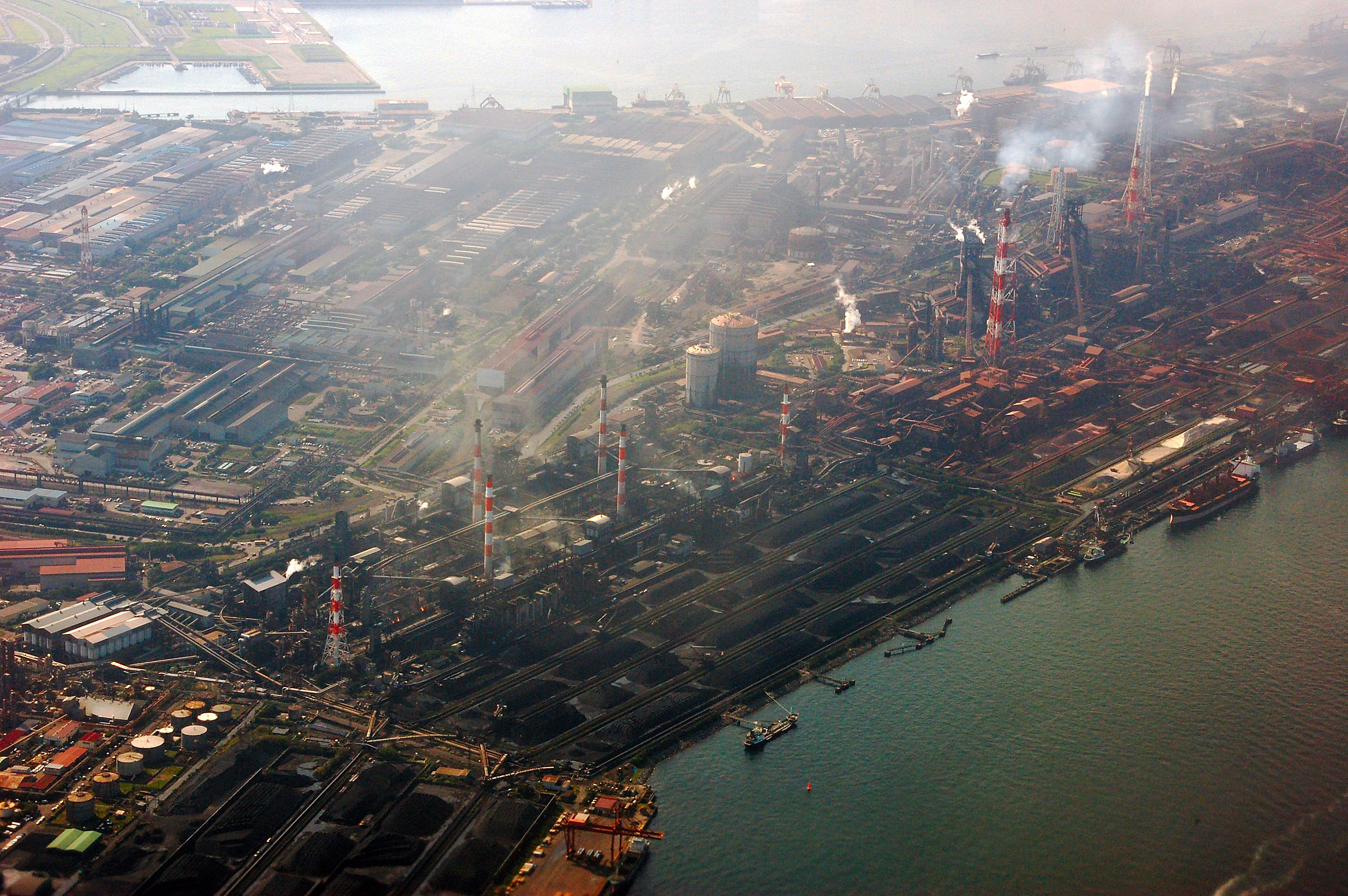
Nippon Steel Kimitsu Works, 2007, Kimitsu, Keiyō Industrial Zone

During the Occupation of Japan (1945–1952) Chiba Prefecture was controlled by American forces from the second floor of the prefectural capitol building in the city of Chiba. Numerous other cities in the prefecture, including Chōshi to the north and Tateyama to the south, were used as bases of the occupation; rich agricultural areas across the prefecture somewhat safeguarded the region's population from potential food shortages, and starvation, immediately following the war. The immediate post-war period was characterized by carefully planned industrial expansion in the north of the prefecture, and the significant increase of agriculture after land reforms across the prefecture. The Keiyō Industrial Zone brought together smaller, industrial areas along the entirety of the western coast of Chiba Prefecture, and the industrial zone became (and remains) an important center of heavy industrial production and large-scale port facilities in Japan. Cities to the northeast of the prefecture (in close proximity to Tokyo) were connected by rail to the capitol, and became and remain bedroom communities to Tokyo. Narita International Airport began operation in 1978 in Narita, after much protest to replace the overcrowded Tokyo International Airport (Haneda Airport). The majority of international air traffic enters Japan via Chiba Prefecture. The cultivation of rice and vegetables to feed the Greater Tokyo Metropolitan Area expanded greatly and became a source of income to the northeast and central areas of the prefecture. The expansion of agriculture in the central and southern regions of the prefecture was in contrast to the depopulation of these areas as a significant part of the population moved to the northeast of the prefecture as a result of the urbanization of Japan, a process that continues into the 21st century.

On March 11, 2011, the epicenter of 9.0 magnitude earthquake and tsunami and subsequent Fukushima nuclear disaster that devastated much of the northeastern coast of Honshu, which caused some damage and affected areas in Chiba Prefecture. While the loss of life and damage to housing and industry was far less than in Tōhoku region, 20 people were killed in Chiba Prefecture, including 13 people were recorded deaths in Asahi. Following the triple disaster, an oil refinery fire broke out at the Cosmo Oil Chiba Refinery, in Ichihara, and was widely covered in the news media. Also, a large liquefied petroleum gas (LPG) tanks burned at 10 days earlier. Soil liquefaction, in areas of reclaimed land across the northern and western areas of Chiba Prefecture, caused damage to housing. Chiba City, Funabashi, Narashino, and especially Urayasu were greatly affected by triple disaster (such as soil liquefaction, and evidence of radioactive materials caused by the Fukushima radiation). As a result of triple disaster and with permanent damage to housing stock, the population of Chiba Prefecture fell for the first time since Spanish flu pandemic in 1918 and Great Kanto earthquake in 1923.

== Geography ==
Chiba Prefecture borders Ibaraki Prefecture to the north at the Tone River, Tokyo and Saitama Prefecture to the west at the Edo River, the Pacific Ocean to the east and Tokyo Bay around its southern boundary. Most of Chiba lies on the hilly Boso Peninsula, a rice farming region: the east coast, known as the Kujūkuri Plain, is an especially productive area. The most populous zone, in the northwest of the prefecture, is part of the Kantō region that extends into the urban agglomeration of Tokyo and Saitama. The Kuroshio Current flows near Chiba, which keeps it relatively warm in winter and cooler in summer than neighbouring Tokyo.

=== National and prefectural parks ===
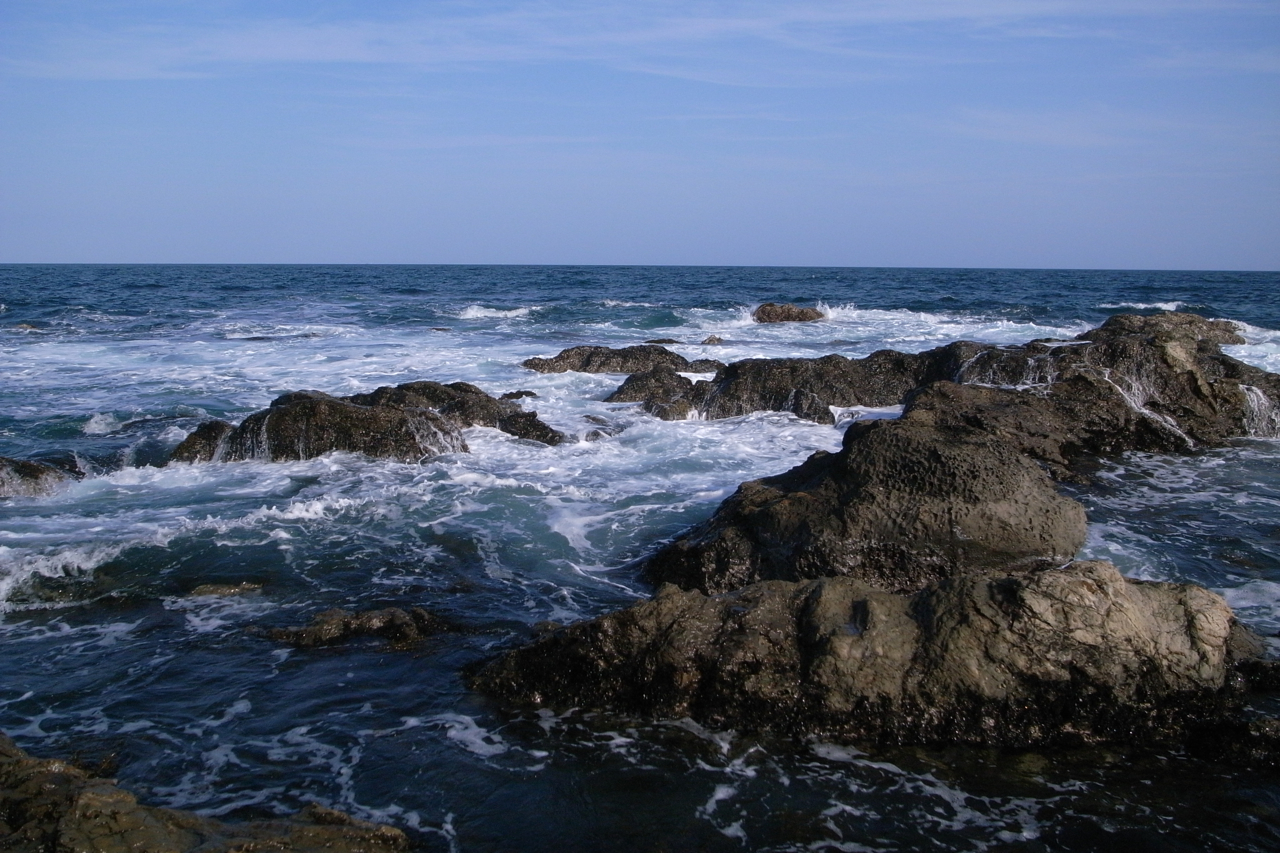
Coastal area in Emi, Kamogawa

With the exception of the large-scale Keiyō Industrial Zone in the northeast, the entirety of the coast of Chiba Prefecture is protected as two quasi-national parks and one prefectural natural park under the national park system of Japan. As of 1 April 2012, 6% of the total land area of the prefecture was designated as Natural Parks.

- Suigo-Tsukuba Quasi-National Park encompasses a large area of the Tone River basin and the area around Mount Tsukuba in Ibaraki Prefecture. The park was established in 1953 to protect not only the environment of the area, but also its unique cultural heritage. The mouth of the Tone River and to Cape Inubō and Byōbugaura in northeastern Chiba Prefecture make up the southern part of the park.
- Minami Boso Quasi-National Park was established in 1953 to protect much of the southern coastal areas of Chiba Prefecture from Cape Futtsu on Tokyo Bay to Cape Inubō in northeastern Chiba Prefecture. The park spans across nine administrative districts in the prefecture. Minami Boso Quasi-National Park was established to protect not only the environment of coastal areas, but also the unique cultural assets of associated with these areas, notably the temples associated with Nichiren.

Chiba Prefecture has designated and maintains eight prefectural natural parks to protect both natural and cultural areas, namely the Inba Tega, Kasamori Tsurumai, Kujūkuri, Mineokasankei, Ōtone, Takagoyama, Tomisan, and Yōrō Keikoku Okukiyosumi Prefectural Natural Parks. Cities, towns, and villages in the prefecture also have designated and protected parklands. These parks are maintained for environmental protection as well as providing local recreational facilities.

== Municipalities ==
Map of Chiba Prefecture Government Ordinance Designated City Other city Town Village

Since 2010, Chiba consists of 54 municipalities and since 2013, they are 37 cities, 16 towns and one village.

Municipalities of Chiba Prefecture
| Flag, short name w/o suffix | Full name | | | District (-gun) | Area (km^{2}) (January 2021) | Population (March 2021) | LPE code (w/o pref. [12...], checksum [-x]) |
| Flag, short name w/o suffix | Japanese | transcription | translation | District (-gun) | Area (km^{2}) (January 2021) | Population (March 2021) | LPE code (w/o pref. [12...], checksum [-x]) |
|---|---|---|---|---|---|---|---|
| Chiba (Prefectural capital, designated major city) | 千葉市 | Chiba-shi | Chiba City | – | 271.76 | 981,738 | 100 |
| Chōshi | 銚子市 | Chōshi-shi | Chōshi City | – | 84.20 | 57,533 | 202 |
| Ichikawa | 市川市 | Ichikawa-shi | Ichikawa City | – | 57.45 | 496,657 | 203 |
| Funabashi (Core city) | 船橋市 | Funabashi-shi | Funabashi City | – | 61.38 | 641,499 | 204 |
| Tateyama | 館山市 | Tateyama-shi | Tateyama City | – | 110.05 | 44,692 | 205 |
| Kisarazu | 木更津市 | Kisarazu-shi | Kisarazu City | – | 138.95 | 136,118 | 206 |
| Matsudo | 松戸市 | Matsudo-shi | Matsudo City | – | 61.38 | 492,367 | 207 |
| Noda | 野田市 | Noda-shi | Noda City | – | 103.55 | 152,227 | 208 |
| Mobara | 茂原市 | Mobara-shi | Mobara City | – | 99.92 | 86,446 | 210 |
| Narita | 成田市 | Narita-shi | Narita City | – | 213.84 | 130,689 | 211 |
| Sakura | 佐倉市 | Sakura-shi | Sakura City | – | 103.69 | 169,059 | 212 |
| Tōgane | 東金市 | Tōgane-shi | Tōgane City | – | 89.12 | 57,560 | 213 |
| Asahi | 旭市 | Asahi-shi | Asahi City | – | 130.45 | 63,507 | 215 |
| Narashino | 習志野市 | Narashino-shi | Narashino City | – | 20.97 | 174,990 | 216 |
| Kashiwa (Core city) | 柏市 | Kashiwa-shi | Kashiwa City | – | 114.74 | 433,941 | 217 |
| Katsuura | 勝浦市 | Katsuura-shi | Katsuura City | – | 93.96 | 16,723 | 218 |
| Ichihara | 市原市 | Ichihara-shi | Ichihara City | – | 368.17 | 268,038 | 219 |
| Nagareyama | 流山市 | Nagareyama-shi | Nagareyama City | – | 35.32 | 200,298 | 220 |
| Yachiyo | 八千代市 | Yachiyo-shi | Yachiyo City | – | 51.39 | 200,538 | 221 |
| Abiko | 我孫子市 | Abiko-shi | Abiko City | – | 43.15 | 130,290 | 222 |
| Kamogawa | 鴨川市 | Kamogawa-shi | Kamogawa City | – | 191.14 | 31,554 | 223 |
| Kamagaya | 鎌ケ谷市 | Kamagaya-shi | Kamagaya City | – | 21.08 | 109,370 | 224 |
| Kimitsu | 君津市 | Kimitsu-shi | Kimitsu City | – | 318.81 | 81,355 | 225 |
| Futtsu | 富津市 | Futtsu-shi | Futtsu City | – | 205.47 | 42,280 | 226 |
| Urayasu | 浦安市 | Urayasu-shi | Urayasu City | – | 17.30 | 169,749 | 227 |
| Yotsukaidō | 四街道市 | Yotsukaidō-shi | Yotsukaidō City | – | 34.52 | 93,233 | 228 |
| Sodegaura | 袖ケ浦市 | Sodegaura-shi | Sodegaura City | – | 94.93 | 63,975 | 229 |
| Yachimata | 八街市 | Yachimata-shi | Yachimata City | – | 74.94 | 66,430 | 230 |
| Inzai | 印西市 | Inzai-shi | Inzai City (In[ba] West City) | – | 123.79 | 103,677 | 231 |
| Shiroi | 白井市 | Shiroi-shi | Shiroi City | – | 35.48 | 61,673 | 232 |
| Tomisato | 富里市 | Tomisato-shi | Tomisato City | – | 53.88 | 49,470 | 233 |
| Minamiboso | 南房総市 | Minami-Bōsō-shi | Minami-Boso City (South Boso City) | – | 230.10 | 35,454 | 234 |
| Sōsa | 匝瑳市 | Sōsa-shi | Sōsa City (after Sōsa District) | – | 101.52 | 34,427 | 235 |
| Katori | 香取市 | Katori-shi | Katori City (after Katori District) | – | 262.35 | 71,391 | 236 |
| Sanmu | 山武市 | Sanmu-shi | Sanmu City | – | 146.77 | 48,196 | 237 |
| Isumi | いすみ市 | Isumi-shi | Isumi City | – | 157.50 | 35,570 | 238 |
| Ōamishirasato | 大網白里市 | Ōami-Shirasato-shi | Ōami-Shirasato City (merger of Ōami Town & Shirasato Village) | – | 58.08 | 47,722 | 239 |
| Shisui | 酒々井町 | Shisui-machi | Shisui Town | Inba | 19.01 | 20,278 | 322 |
| Sakae | 栄町 | Sakae-machi | Sakae Town | Inba | 32.51 | 19,902 | 329 |
| Kōzaki | 神崎町 | Kōzaki-machi | Kōzaki Town | Katori | 19.90 | 5,663 | 342 |
| Tako | 多古町 | Tako-machi | Tako Town | Katori | 72.80 | 13,804 | 347 |
| Tōnoshō | 東庄町 | Tōnoshō-machi | Tōnoshō Town | Katori | 46.25 | 13,085 | 349 |
| Kujūkuri | 九十九里町 | Kujūkuri-machi | Kujūkuri Town | Sanbu | 24.46 | 14,652 | 403 |
| Shibayama | 芝山町 | Shibayama-machi | Shibayama Town | Sanbu | 43.24 | 6,916 | 409 |
| Yokoshibahikari | 横芝光町 | Yokoshiba-Hikari-machi | Yokoshiba-Hikari Town (merger of Yokoshiba Town & Hikari Town) | Sanbu | 67.01 | 22,271 | 410 |
| Ichinomiya | 一宮町 | Ichinomiya-machi | Ichinomiya Town ([Kazusa] provincial shrine Town) | Chōsei | 22.99 | 11,622 | 421 |
| Mutsuzawa | 睦沢町 | Mutsuzawa-machi | Mutsuzawa Town | Chōsei | 35.59 | 6,761 | 422 |
| Chōsei | 長生村 | Chōsei-mura | Chōsei Village | Chōsei | 28.25 | 13,656 | 423 |
| Shirako | 白子町 | Shirako-machi | Shirako Town | Chōsei | 27.50 | 10,280 | 424 |
| Nagara | 長柄町 | Nagara-machi | Nagara Town | Chōsei | 47.11 | 6,664 | 426 |
| Chōnan | 長南町 | Chōnan-machi | Chōnan Town | Chōsei | 65.51 | 7,368 | 427 |
| Ōtaki | 大多喜町 | Ōtaki-machi | Ōtaki Town | Isumi | 129.87 | 8,762 | 441 |
| Onjuku | 御宿町 | Onjuku-machi | Onjuku Town | Isumi | 24.85 | 6,769 | 443 |
| Kyonan | 鋸南町 | Kyonan-machi | Kyonan Town | Awa | 45.17 | 7,027 | 463 |
| Chiba | 千葉県 | Chiba-ken | Chiba Prefecture | – | 5,157.50 | 6,275,916 | 000 ISO: JP-12 |

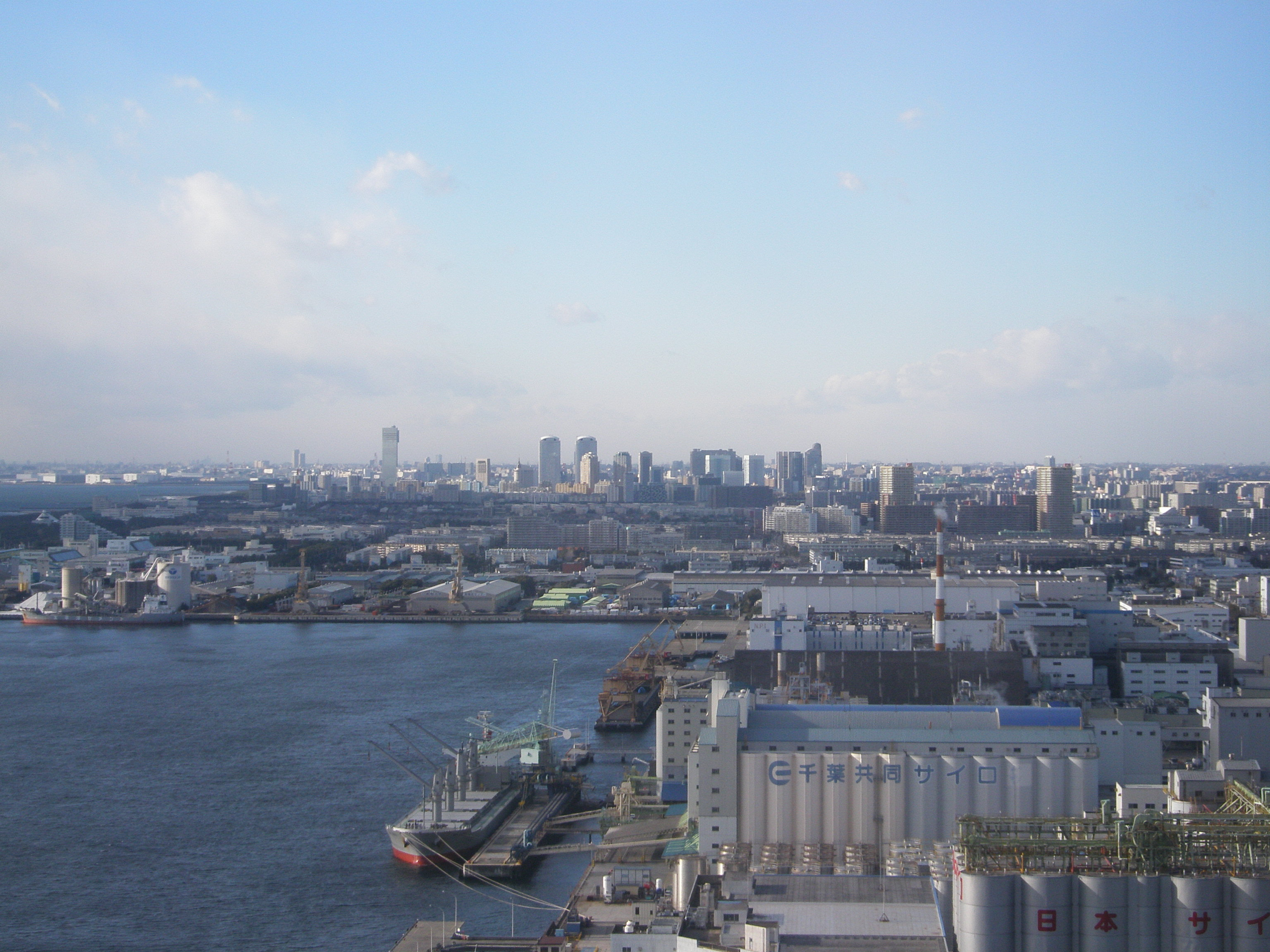
Chiba City

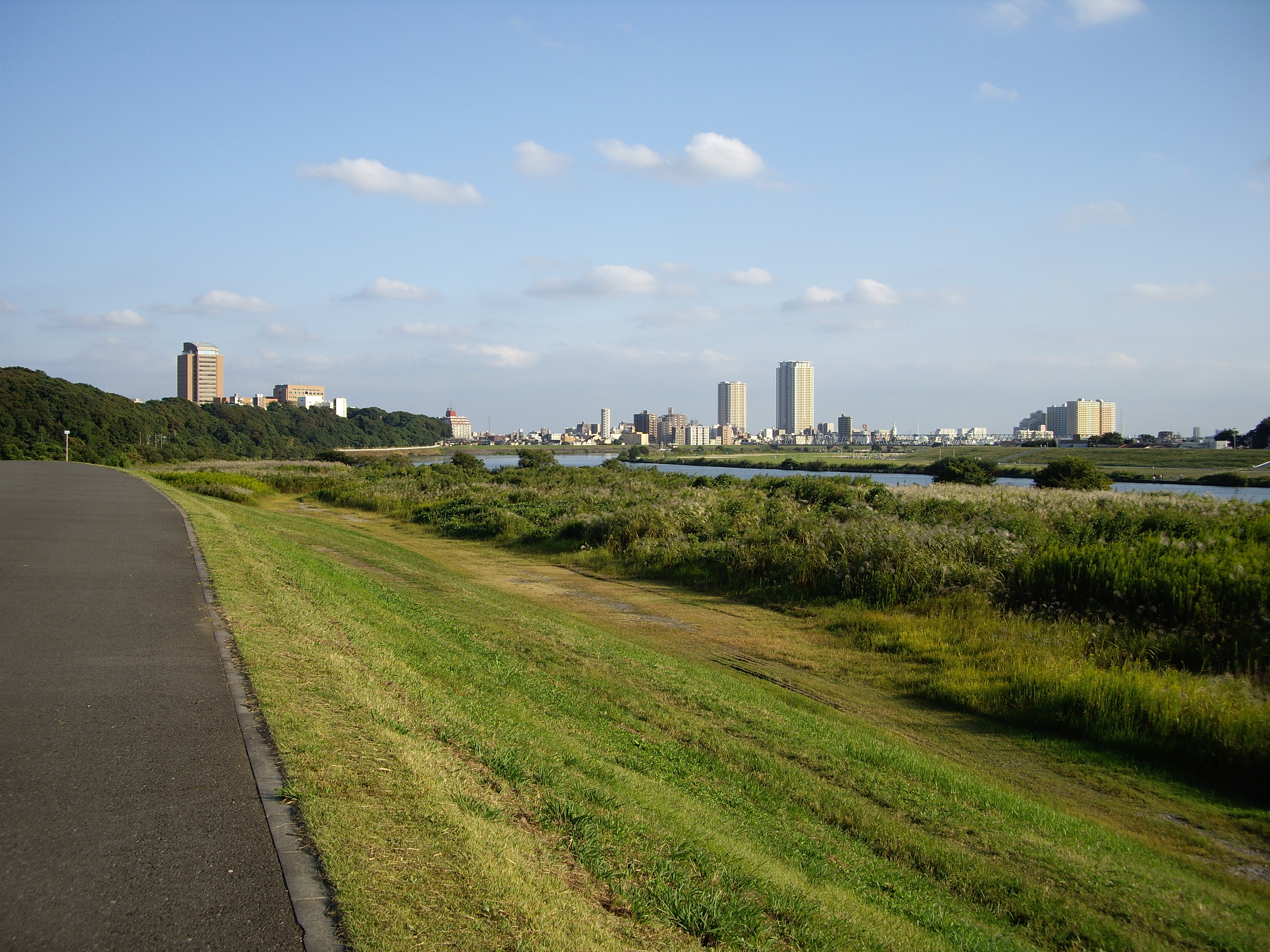
Ichikawa

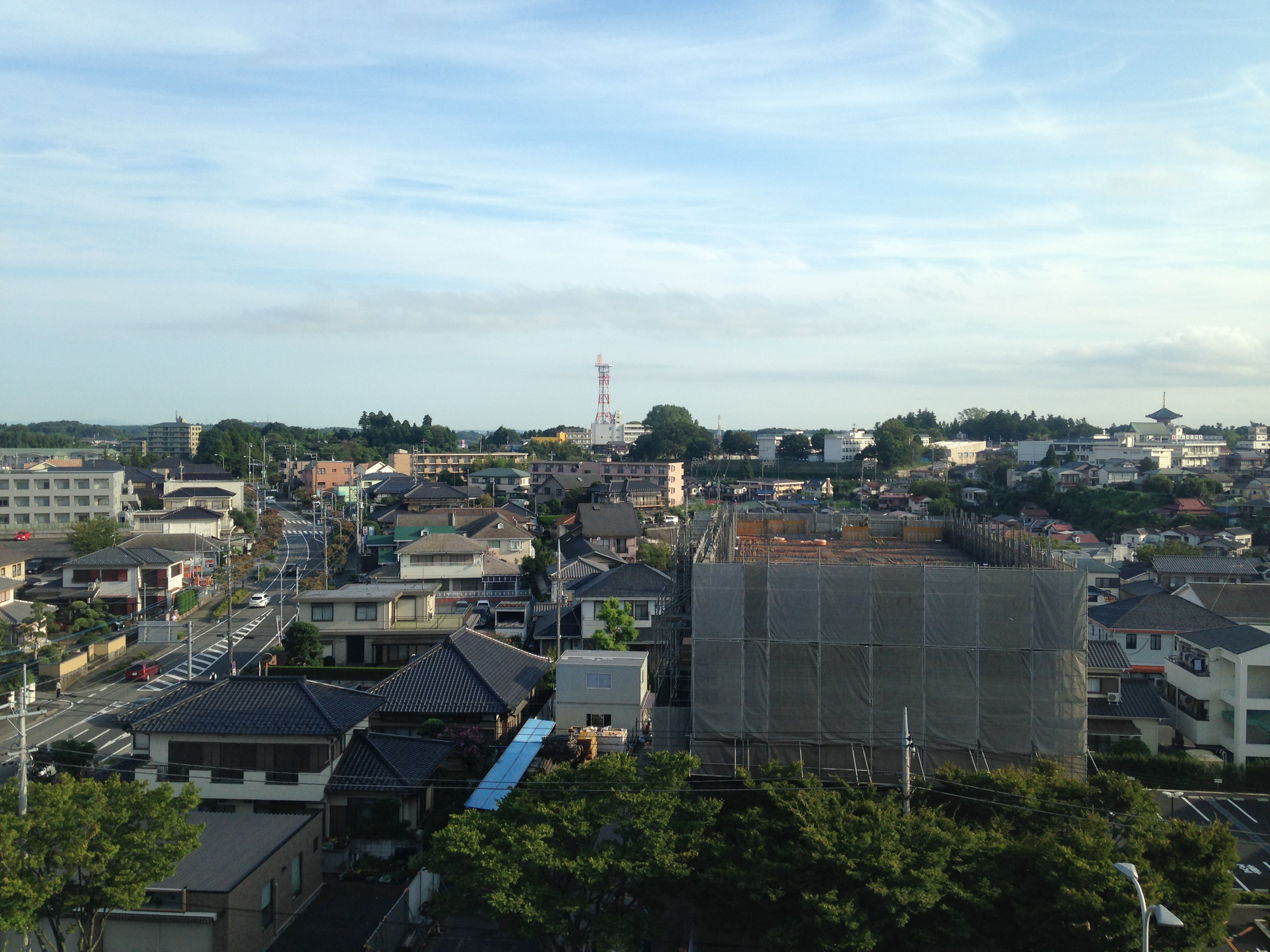
Narita

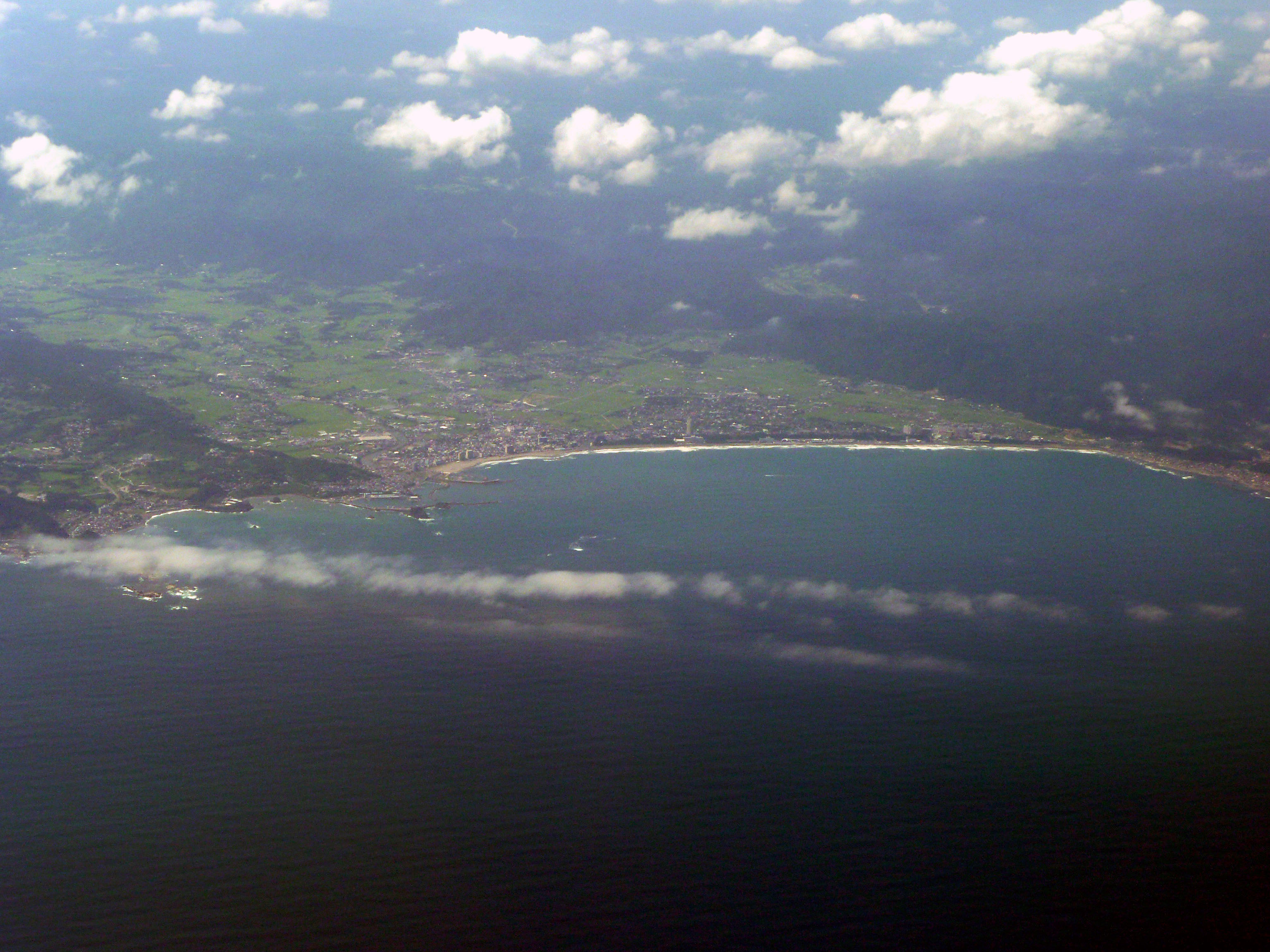
Kamogawa

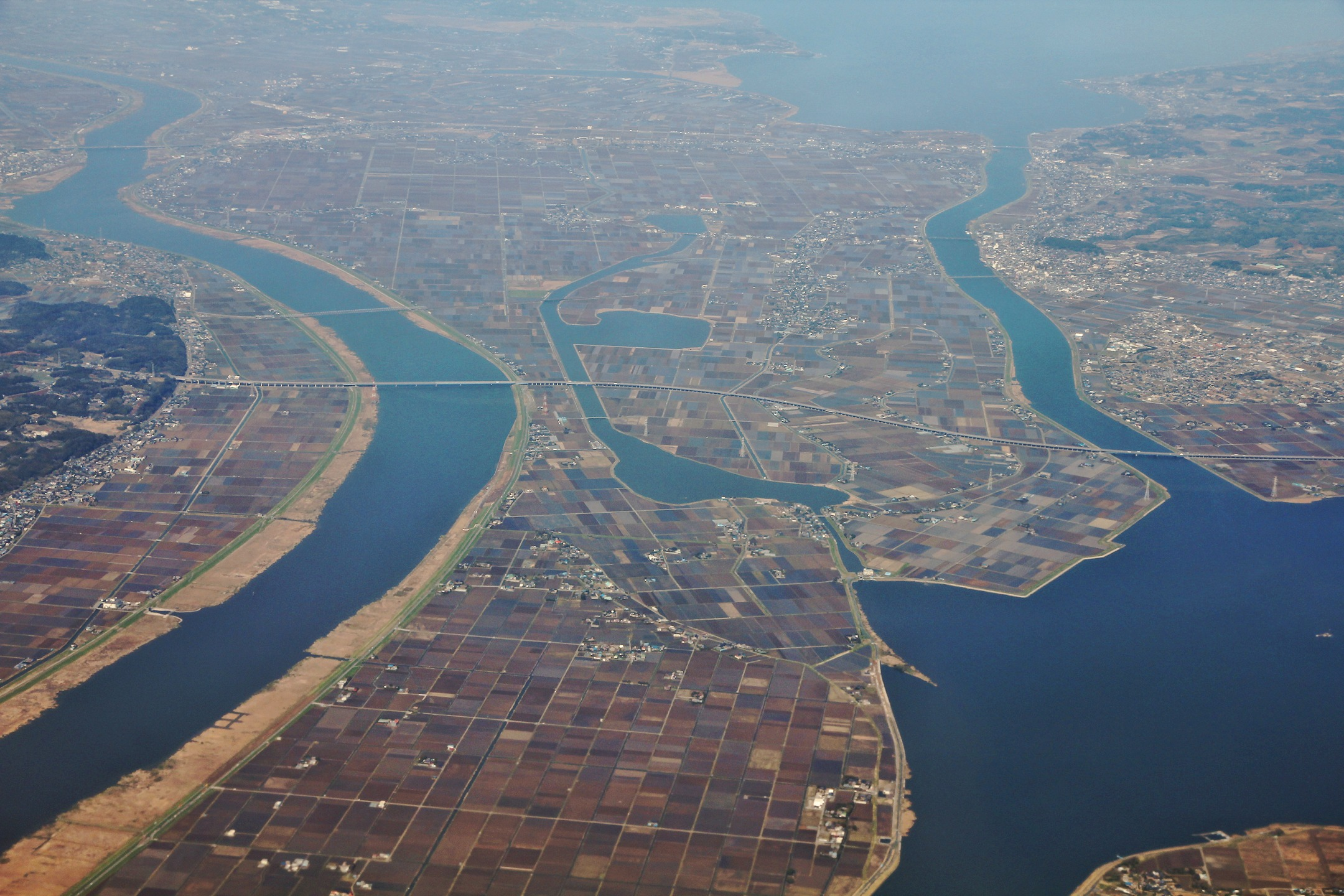
Katori

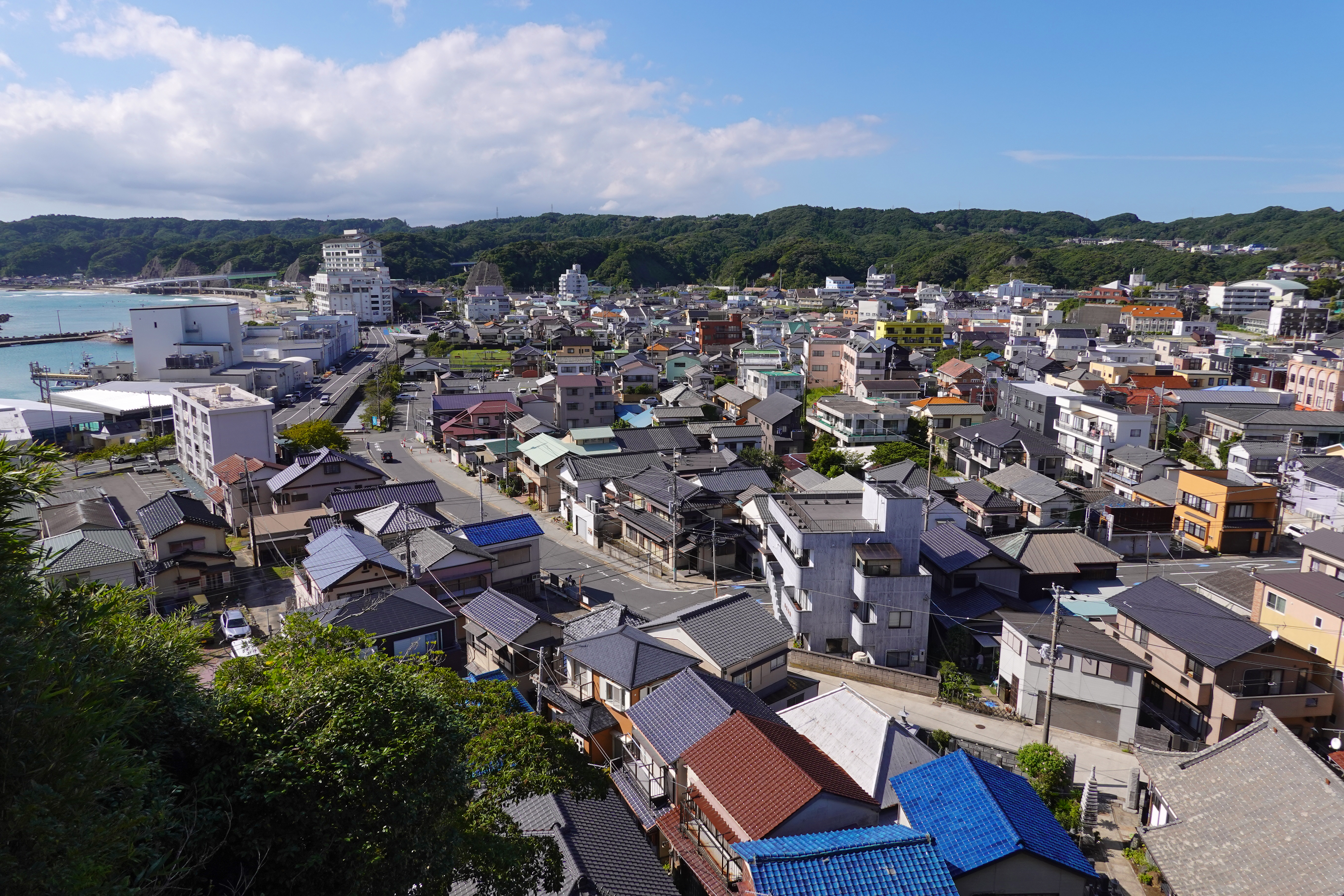
Katsuura

=== Mergers ===
With the introduction of modern municipalities (cities/towns/villages) in 1889, Chiba's districts were subdivided into 43 towns and 315 villages. The first city was created in 1921 when Chiba Town from Chiba District became district-independent as Chiba City. The postwar/1950s Great Shōwa mergers reduced the number of municipalities in Chiba to 101 by 1960, including 14 cities by then. The early 3rd millennium Great Heisei mergers created the current 54 municipalities by 2010.

== List of governors of Chiba Prefecture (from 1947) ==
- Tamenosuke Kawaguchi (川口為之助) – from 21 April 1947 to 25 October 1950
- Hitoshi Shibata (柴田 等) – from 15 December 1950 to 2 November 1962
- Hisaaki Kano (加納久朗) – from 3 November 1962 to 21 February 1963
- Taketo Tomonoo (友納武人) – from 17 April 1963 to 16 April 1975
- Kiichi Kawakami (川上紀一) – from 17 April 1975 to 27 February 1981
- Takeshi Numata (沼田 武) – from 5 April 1981 to 4 April 2001
- Akiko Domoto (堂本暁子) – from 5 April 2001 to 4 April 2009
- Kensaku Morita (森田健作) – from 5 April 2009 to 4 April 2021
- Toshihito Kumagai (熊谷俊人) – from 5 April 2021 to present

== Economy ==
=== Industry ===
Chiba Prefecture is home to one of Japan's largest industrial areas. Prior to World War II manufacturing in the prefecture was centered on the brewing industry, specifically the production of soy sauce, sake and mirin sweet cooking sake. The manufacturing sector expanded greatly after the war. The prefecture was chosen as the site for a major Kawasaki Steel factory in 1950. In the same period the prefectural government embarked on a large-scale land reclamation program to dredge large plots of waterfront property. The large-scale construction of factories, warehouses, and docks on this reclaimed land around the Tokyo Bay area ultimately formed the Keiyō Industrial Zone. Chiba Prefecture is now 6th in Japan in industrial output with the bulk of the industry focused on the petroleum, chemical, and steel and machine industries. Together, these industries account for forty-five percent of the prefecture's exports. In recent years, the government has funded more than eighty industrial parks to bring development further inland as well.

=== Agriculture ===
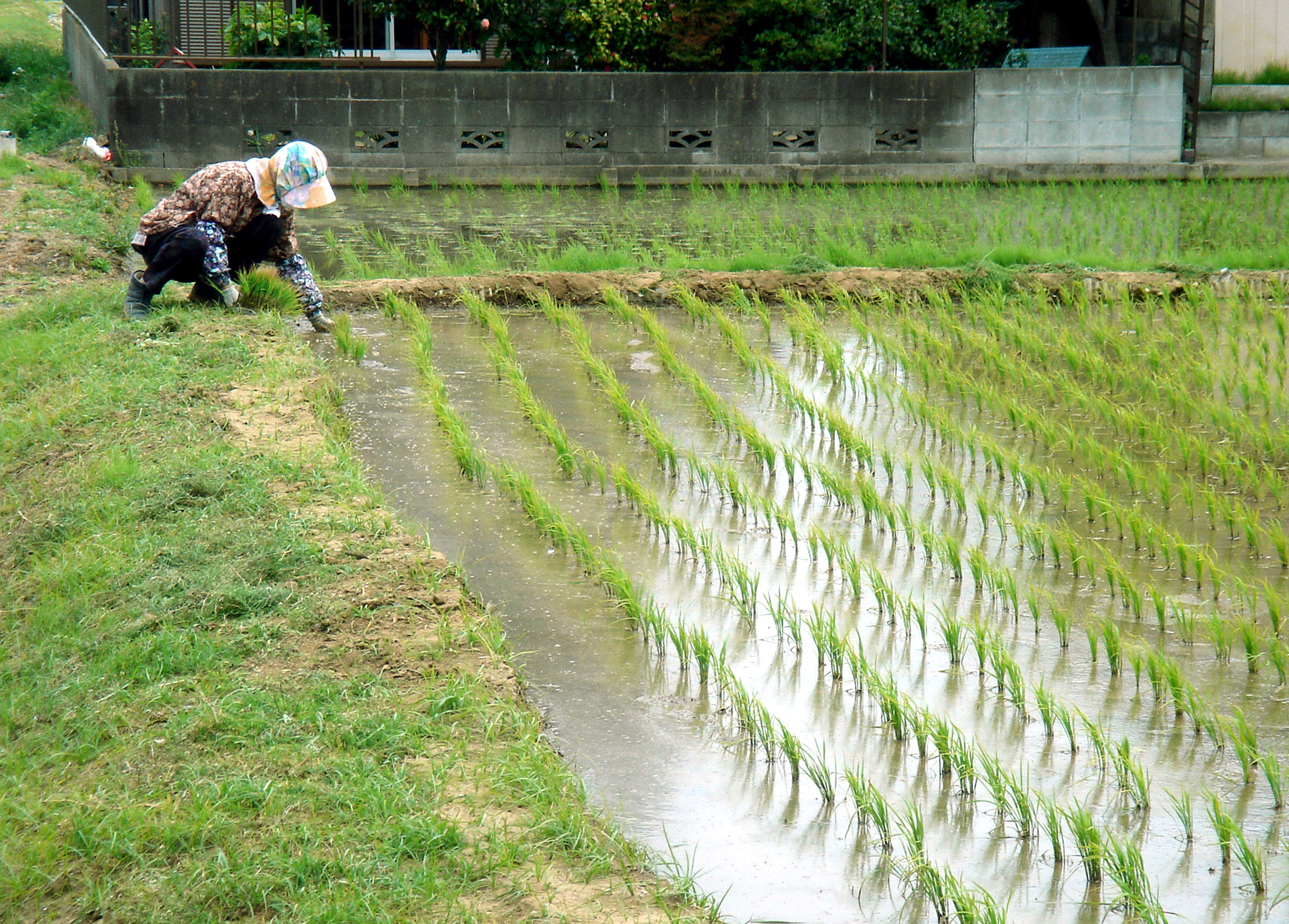
Rice production, Sawara, Katori

The prefecture also boasts Japan's overall second-highest agricultural output. Among all the prefectures, only Hokkaido produces more agricultural products, and Chiba leads Hokkaido in vegetable production. Peanuts are considered a specialty product of Chiba: 78% of the country's peanuts are produced in the prefecture.

Chiba Prefecture leads the nation in the production of several vegetables, including carrots; cabbage; daikon radish; negi, the ubiquitous Japanese cultivar of the Welsh onion; loquat; nashi, the Japanese cultivar of the pear, which has a two hundred-year history of cultivation in the prefecture; tomatoes; and spinach It is the nation's second largest producer of corn. Rice is also grown, and seaweed, specifically nori, is harvested in large quantities from Tokyo Bay.

== Demographics ==
Chiba prefecture population pyramid in 2020

Chiba's population is one of the wealthiest in Japan due to the prefecture's strong commercial and industrial sectors. Per capita GDP is ¥3.1 million, the fifth-highest in the country. 70% of the population is employed in the service sector, with 25% in industry and 5% in agriculture.

== Climate ==
Chiba Prefecture has a humid subtropical climate (Koppen Cfa) with hot, humid summers and mild, cool winters. The tsuyu rainy season occurs for approximately 50 days from June to July. According to the Japanese Meteorological Agency, the average of annual temperature is 15.7 °C (60.3 °F). The average high is 19.6 °C (67.3 °F), and the average low is 12.3 °C (54.1 °F).

Climate data for Chiba, Chiba
| Month | Jan | Feb | Mar | Apr | May | Jun | Jul | Aug | Sep | Oct | Nov | Dec | Year |
|---|---|---|---|---|---|---|---|---|---|---|---|---|---|
| Mean daily maximum °C (°F) | 9 (48) | 9 (48) | 12 (53) | 17 (63) | 22 (71) | 24 (75) | 27 (81) | 29 (85) | 26 (79) | 21 (69) | 16 (61) | 12 (53) | 19 (66) |
| Mean daily minimum °C (°F) | 1 (33) | 1 (34) | 4 (39) | 9 (49) | 14 (57) | 18 (64) | 21 (70) | 23 (74) | 19 (67) | 13 (56) | 8 (46) | 3 (37) | 11 (52) |
| Average precipitation mm (inches) | 48.3 (1.90) | 66 (2.6) | 94 (3.7) | 109.2 (4.30) | 96.5 (3.80) | 139.7 (5.50) | 106.7 (4.20) | 121.9 (4.80) | 177.8 (7.00) | 157.5 (6.20) | 83.8 (3.30) | 48.3 (1.90) | 1,249.7 (49.2) |
Source: weather.com

In August 2026, unusually heavy rains caused floods and landslides, leaving 20,000 people without power and at least 4 persons dead.

== Education ==
=== Universities ===
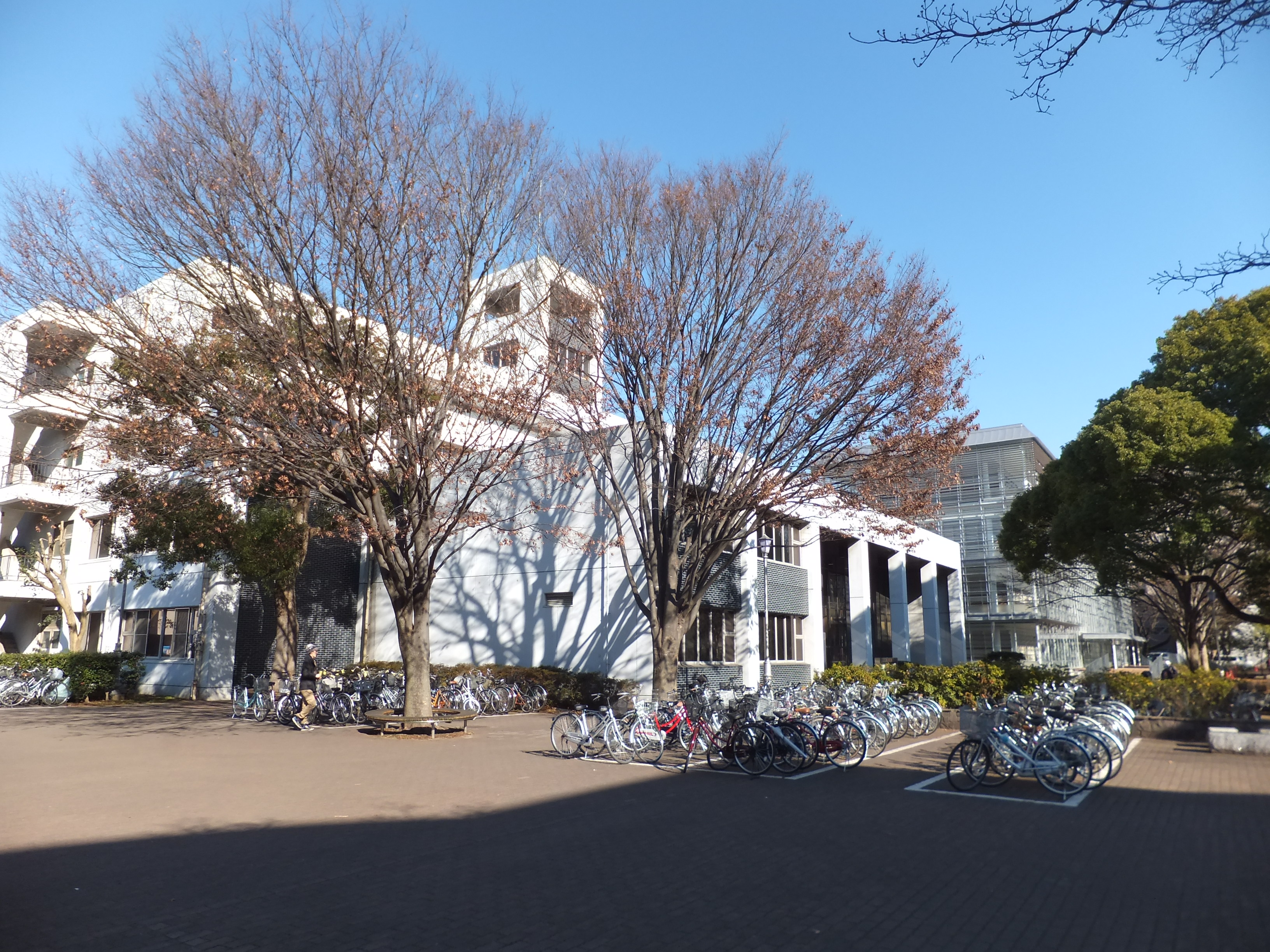
Chiba University Library

- Chiba
  - Chiba University in Inage, Chuo
  - Chiba Economic University in Inage
  - The Open University of Japan in Mihama
  - The Meteorological College of Japan
  - Heisei Teikyo University in Mihama
  - Shukutoku University in Chuo
  - Tokyo Information Sciences University in Wakaba
  - Tokyo Dental College in Mihama
  - Kanda University of International Studies in Mihama
  - Tokyo University of Career Development in Chuo
- Funabashi
  - Toho University – Narashino Campus
  - Nihon University – Funabashi Campus
- Matsudo
  - Nihon University – Matsudo Campus
  - Ryutsu Keizai University
  - Seitoku University
- Ichikawa
  - Chiba Commerce University
  - Wayo Women's University
- Kashiwa
  - University of Tokyo – Kashiwa Campus
  - Chiba University – Kashiwanoha Campus
  - Kaichi International University
  - Nishogakusha University – Kasiwa Campus
  - Reitaku University
- Narashino
  - Chiba Institute of Technology
  - Nihon University – Narashino and Mimomi Campus
- Ichihara
  - Heisei Teikyo University – Ichihara Campus
- Yachiyo
  - Shumei University
  - Tokyo Seitoku University
- Sakura
  - Keiai University – Sakura Campus
- Noda
  - Tokyo University of Science – Noda Campus
- Nagareyama
  - Edogawa University
  - Toyo Gakuen University
- Urayasu
  - Juntendo University – Urayasu Campus
  - Meikai University
  - Ryotokuji University
- Abiko
  - Chuo Gakuin University
  - Kawamura Gakuen Woman's University
- Kisarazu
  - Seiwa University
- Togane
  - Josai International University
- Inzai
  - Juntendo University – Sakura Campus
- Kamogawa
  - Kameda College of Health Sciences

=== Secondary schools ===
The Chiba Prefectural Board of Education oversees municipal school districts in the prefecture. The board also directly operates the prefecture's public high schools.

== Culture ==
=== Museums ===
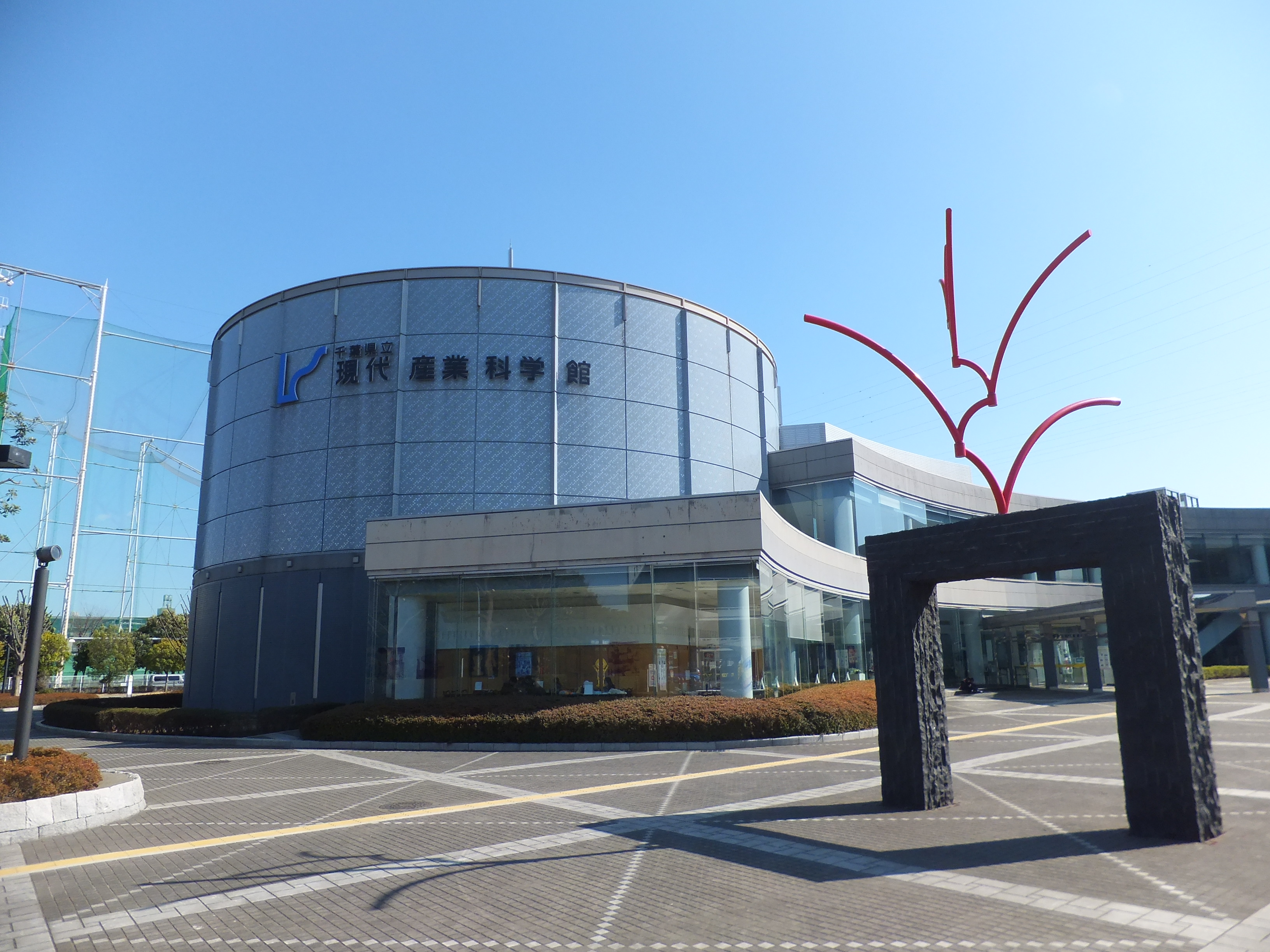
Chiba Museum of Science and Industry

Chiba Prefecture is home to one national-level museum and several prefectural and local museums. The National Museum of Japanese History is located in Sakura and focuses on the history, archaeology, and folk culture of Japan. The Chiba prefectural museums consist of a main museum, the Natural History Museum and Institute, Chiba in the central Chuō-ku ward of Chiba City, and six branch museums throughout the prefecture. The Chiba Prefectural Museum of Art is in Chiba City. The Chiba Prefectural Boso-no-mura in Sakae focuses on the local culture of the late Edo period, and the Chiba Prefectural Otone Museum in Katori focuses on the culture of the Tone River basin. The reconstructed Japanese castles of Sekiyado and Ōtaki host regional historical museums. The Chiba Museum of Science and Industry is located in Ichikawa on the site of a former factory, and the Coastal Branch of Natural History Museum and Institute, Chiba in Katsuura focuses on the marine environment of the Pacific Ocean coast. Numerous other municipalities in the prefecture also host museums.

=== Libraries and archives ===
The Chiba Prefectural Library consists of three libraries. The Chiba Prefectural Central Library is located in the central Chuō-ku ward of Chiba City directly southwest of Chiba Castle and in close proximity to the City of Chiba offices. The Central Library houses a general collection as well as the central research collection for the prefecture. The Chiba Prefectural West Library is located in Matsudo next to the Matsudo Museum, and houses a research collection focused on natural history and the fine arts. The Chiba Prefectural East Library is located in Asahi, and houses a research collection focused on the literature and history of the prefecture. The Chiba Prefectural Archives are located across the Miyako River from the City of Chiba offices. The archive maintains a collection of rare books and materials from across the prefecture, as well as materials related to the administration of Chiba Prefecture. Each municipality in the prefecture maintains a local libraries, and many shrines and temples maintain archival collections related to their institutions.

== Cuisine ==
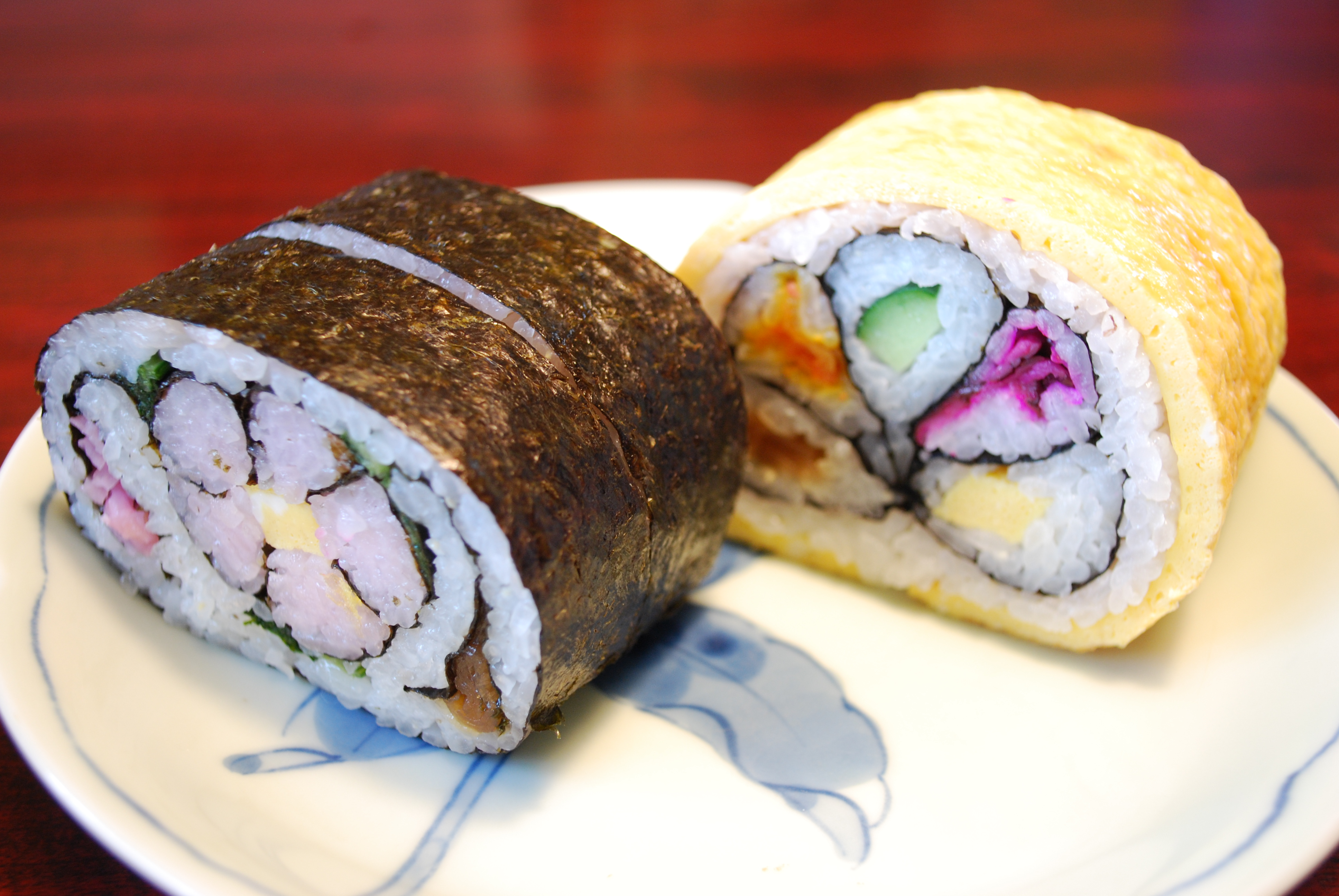
Futomaki, large sushi rolls, Katori, Chiba Prefecture

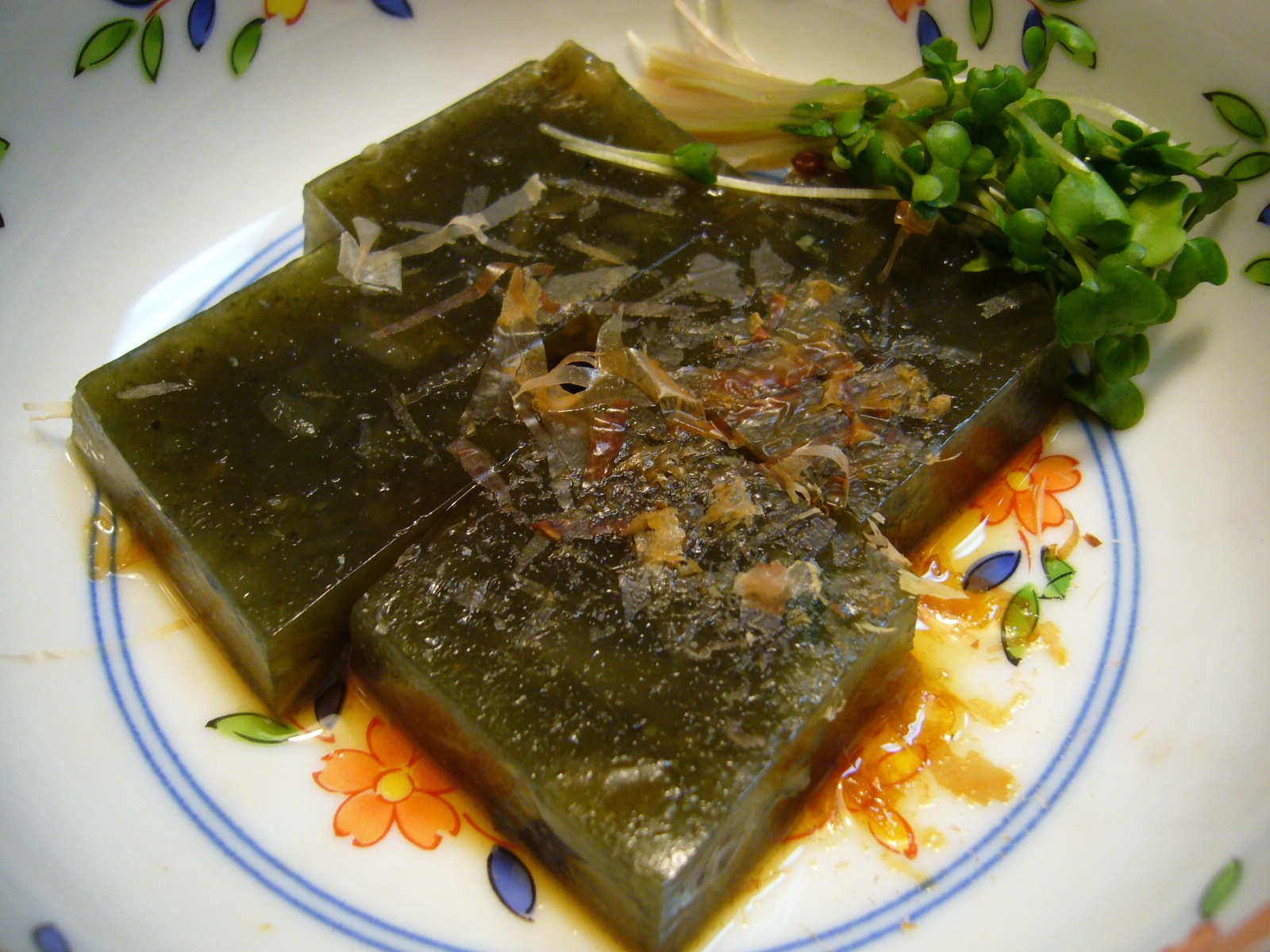
Kaisō, a jelly-like food made from the seaweed Chondrus elatus. Believed to have originated in Chōshi city

The traditional diet of Chiba Prefecture is not fundamentally different from that of the rest of Japan. Chiba Prefecture produces prolific quantities of rice across all areas in the prefecture, vegetables in the northern area of the prefecture, and fish, seafood, and shellfish along the coastal areas of the prefecture. Chōshi has been a major center of worldwide soy sauce production since the Edo period, and the prefecture remains the top producer in Japan. Kikkoman is headquartered in Noda in northwestern Chiba Prefecture. These are all important components of Japanese cuisine.

Certain local products, however, are grown in abundance and have resulted in several dishes unique to the areas. Peanuts, grown in great quantities in the prefecture, appear fresh in markets in the prefecture and are eaten boiled as a snack. Miso paste mixed with peanuts is also produced in Chiba. Takenoko, whole bamboo shoot, are harvested in the central part of the Boso Peninsula. The takenoko of Ōtaki lack the concentration of arsenic typically found in uncooked bamboo shoots, and as such, are uniquely eaten raw in the area as "takenoko sashimi". Futomaki or futomakizushi, literally "fat roll", is a large version of the sushi roll. The futomaki popularly made in Chiba Prefecture is up to 10 centimeters in diameter. Futomaki in Chiba Prefecture often utilize various ingredients to form a pattern, such as a flower or a kanji character, when the roll is cut and served.

== Sports ==
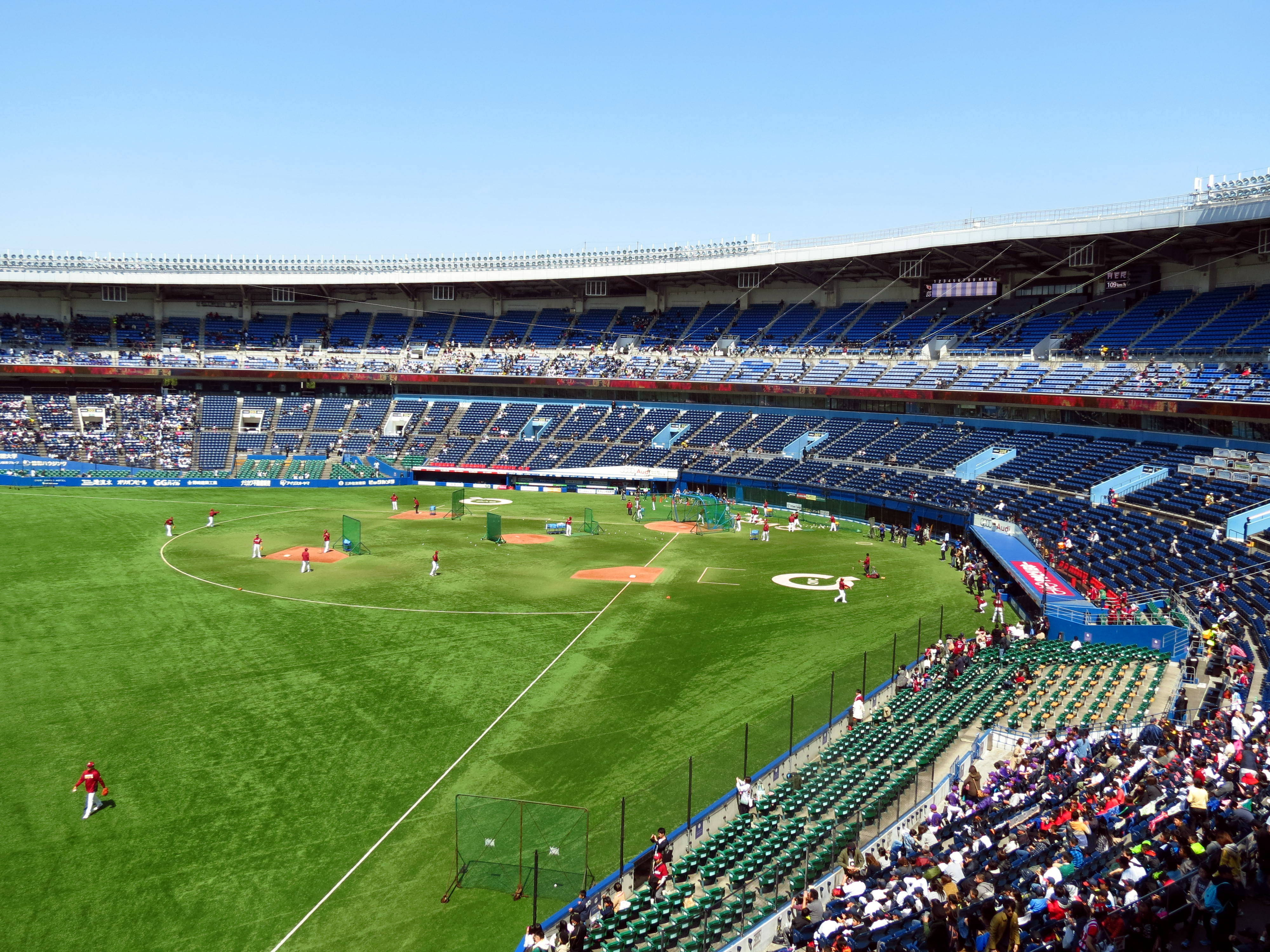
Zozo Marine Stadium, home of Chiba Lotte Marines.

The prefecture plays host to two major events in the Japanese athletics calendar: the International Chiba Ekiden and the Chiba International Cross Country.

The following sports teams are based in Chiba.

=== American football ===
- X-League: Obic Seagulls (Narashino)
- X-League: IBM Big Blue (Yachiyo)

=== Association football ===
- J.League (J1): Kashiwa Reysol (Kashiwa)
- J.League (J1): JEF United Ichihara Chiba (Chiba, Ichihara)
- Japan Football League: Briobecca Urayasu Ichikawa (Urayasu)
- Kantō Soccer League: Vonds Ichihara (Ichihara)

=== Baseball ===
- NPB: Chiba Lotte Marines (Chiba)

=== Basketball ===
- B.League: Chiba Jets Funabashi (Funabashi)

=== Rugby ===
- Kubota Spears (Funabashi)
- JR East Green Warriors Tokatsu (Abiko)
- Maruwa Momotaro's Narita (Narita)

=== Futsal ===
- F.League: Bardral Urayasu (Urayasu)

=== Volleyball ===
- V.Challenge League II: Chiba Zelva (Chiba)

== Transportation ==
=== Narita International Airport ===
Most Tokyo-bound visitors arriving on international flights land in Narita International Airport, which is situated in Narita in the north of the prefecture, and connected to Tokyo by the East Japan Railway's Narita Express and the Keisei Electric Railway's Skyliner.

=== Railways ===
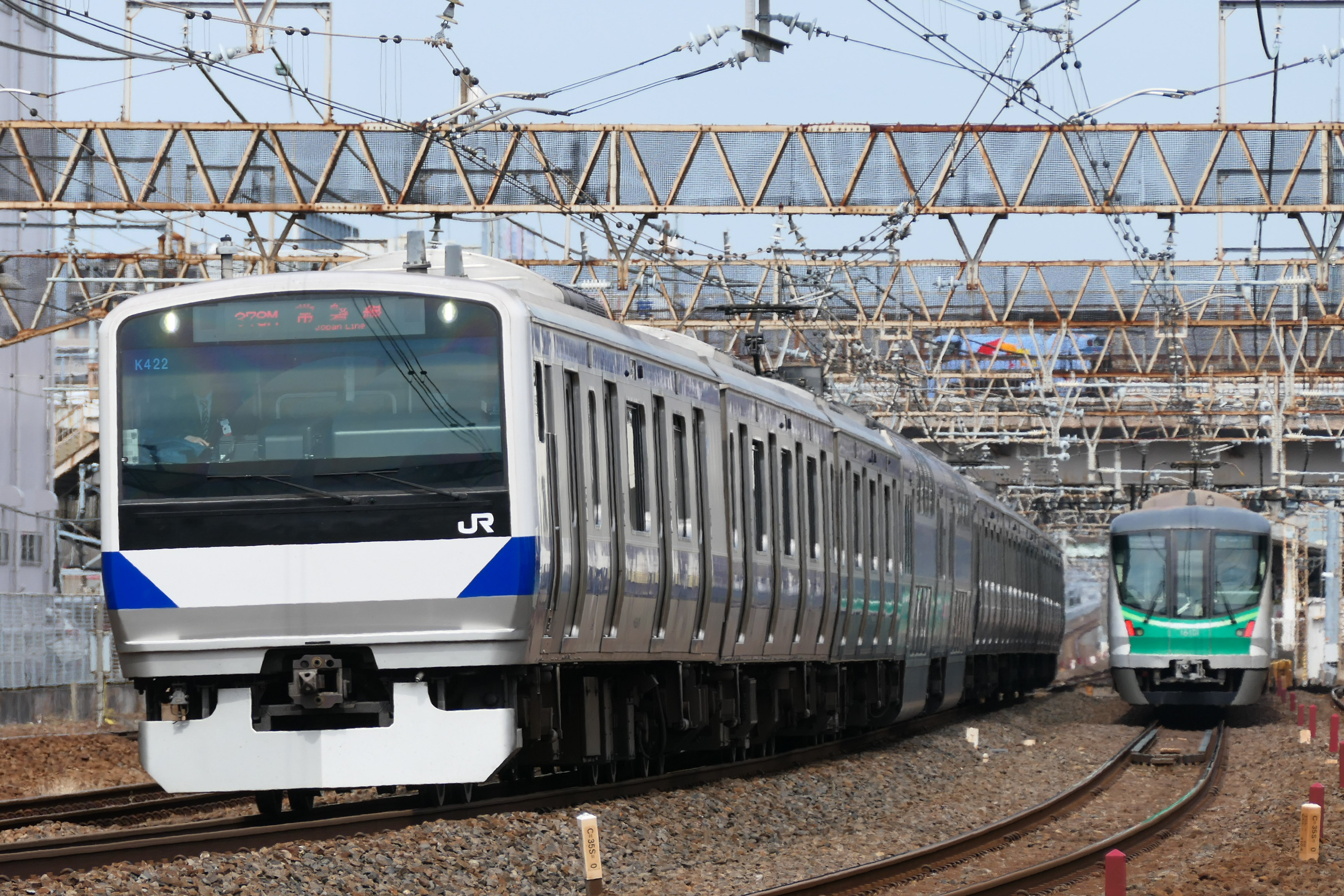
Jōban Line

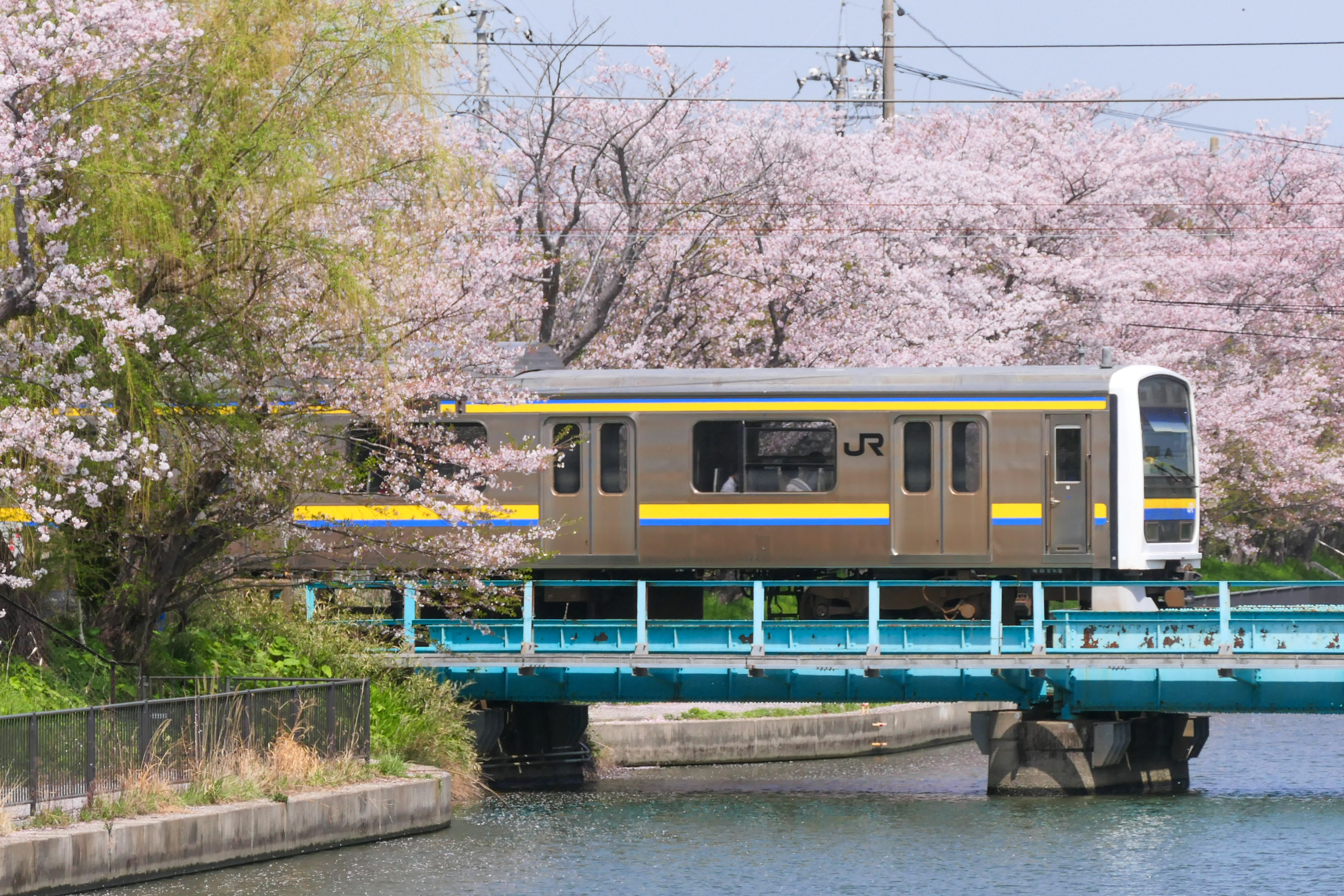
Narita Line

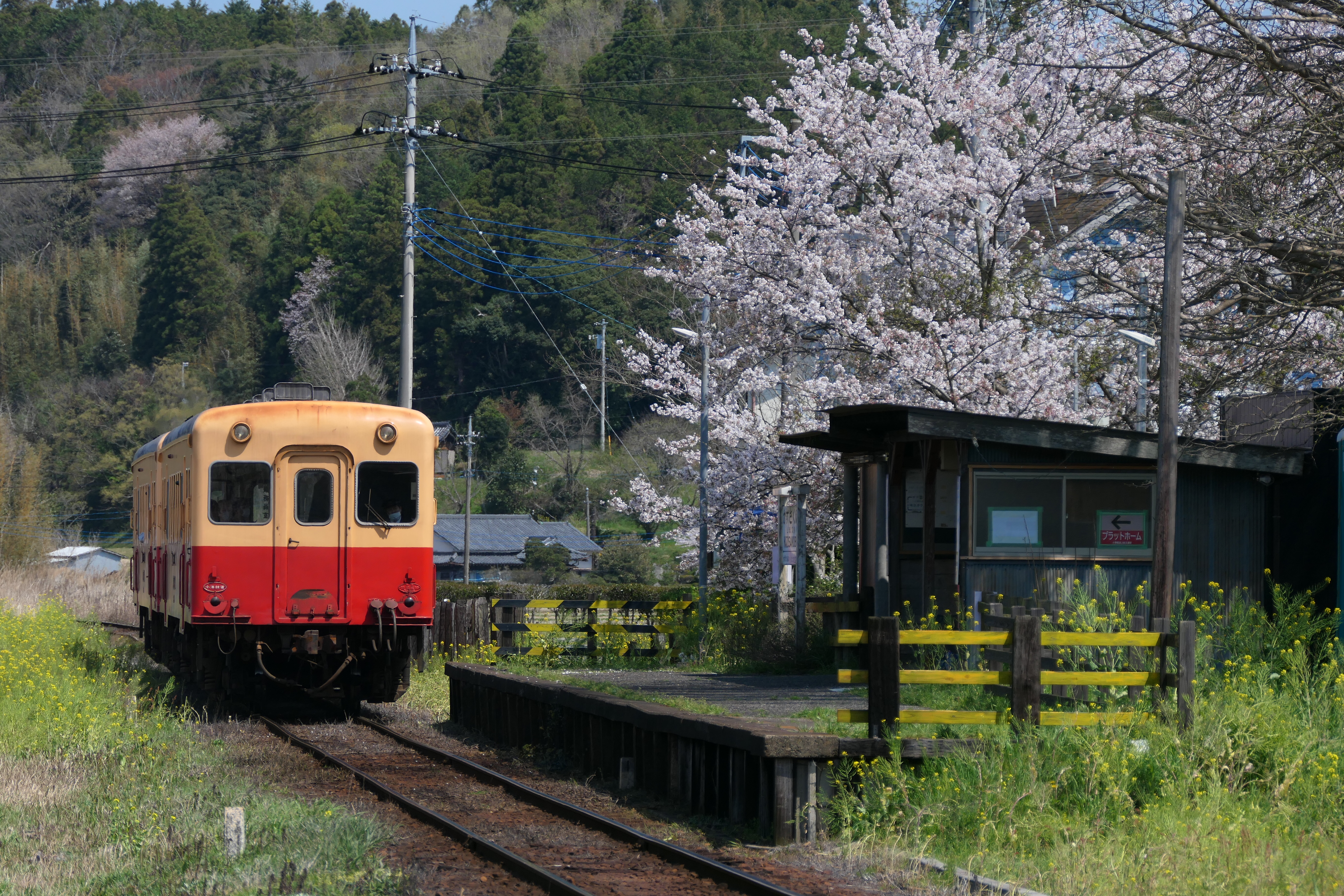
Kominato Railway

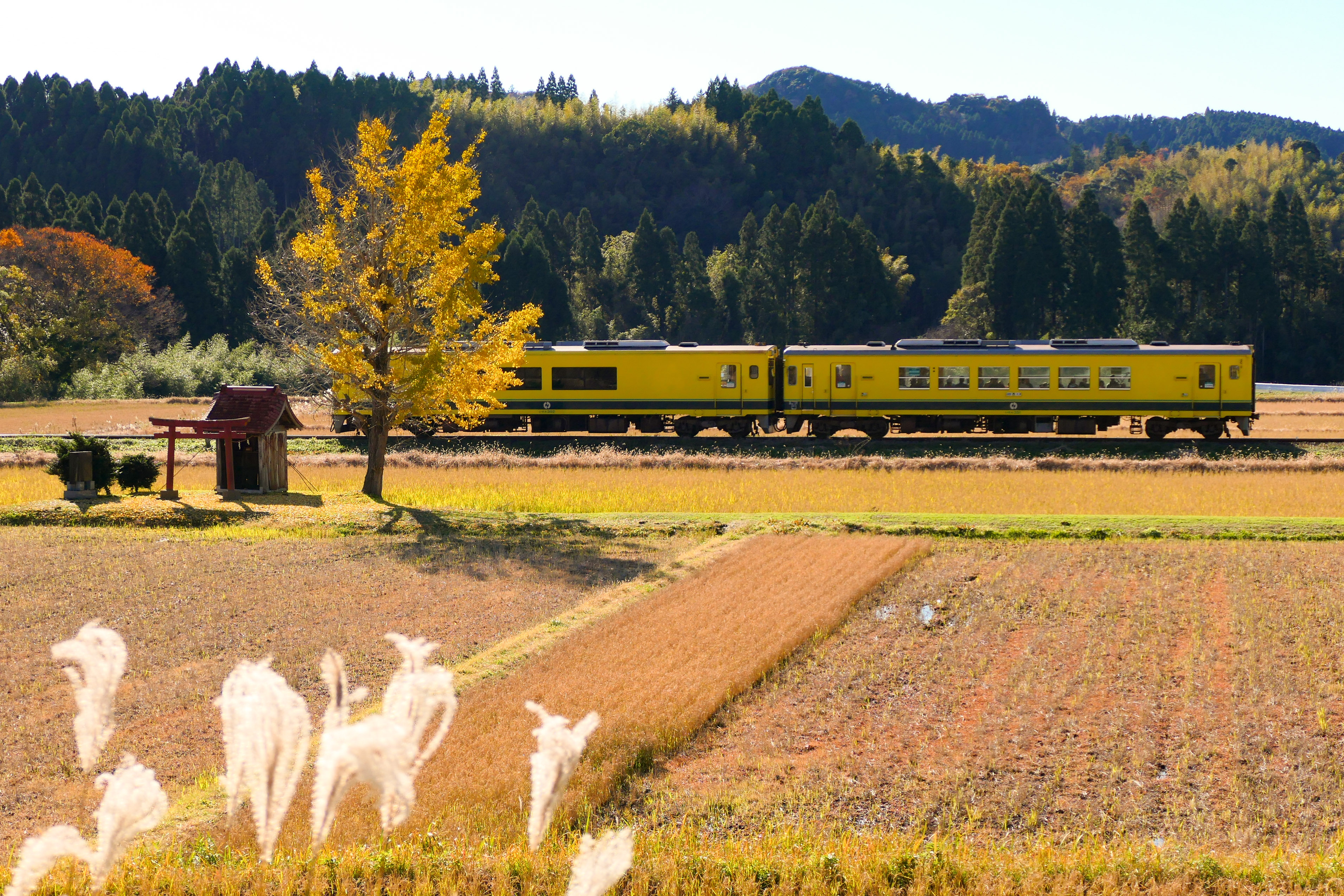
Isumi Railway

- East Japan Railway Company
  - Sōbu Main Line
    - Chūō-Sōbu Line
    - Sōbu Line (Rapid)
  - Jōban Line
    - Jōban Line (Local)
    - Jōban Line (Rapid)
  - Narita Line
  - Uchibō Line
  - Sotobō Line
  - Keiyō Line
  - Musashino Line
  - Tōgane Line
  - Kashima Line
  - Kururi Line
- Keisei
  - Main Line
  - Narita Sky Access
  - Chiba Line
  - Chihara Line
  - Higashi Narita Line
- Shin-Keisei Line
- Hokuso Line
- Toyo Rapid Line
- Shibayama Railway
- Tobu
  - Noda Line
- Tsukuba Express
- Tokyo Metro Tozai Line
- Toei Shinjuku Line
- Nagareyama Line
- Choshi Electric Railway
- Kominato Railway
- Isumi Railway
- Disney Resort Line

=== People movers ===
- Chiba Urban Monorail
- Yamaman Yukarigaoka Line

== Road ==
=== Expressways ===
- Joban Expressway
- Narita Airport Expressway
- Higashi Kanto Expressway
- Tokyo Gaikan Expressway
- Tateyama Expressway
- Shuto Expressway
- Keiyo Road
- Togane Road
- Tokyo Bay Aqua Line

=== National highways ===
- Route 6
- Route 14
- Route 16
- Route 51
- Route 124
- Route 126
- Route 127
- Route 128
- Route 294
- Route 295
- Route 296
- Route 297
- Route 298
- Route 356
- Route 357
- Route 408
- Route 409
- Route 410
- Route 464
- Route 465

== Tourism ==
The Tokyo Disney Resort is located in Urayasu near the western border of the prefecture. The Kamogawa Sea World is located in Kamogawa. There are also a number of tourist sites on the Chiba peninsula, such as Nokogiriyama; Kujūkuri Beach; and Onjuku beach.

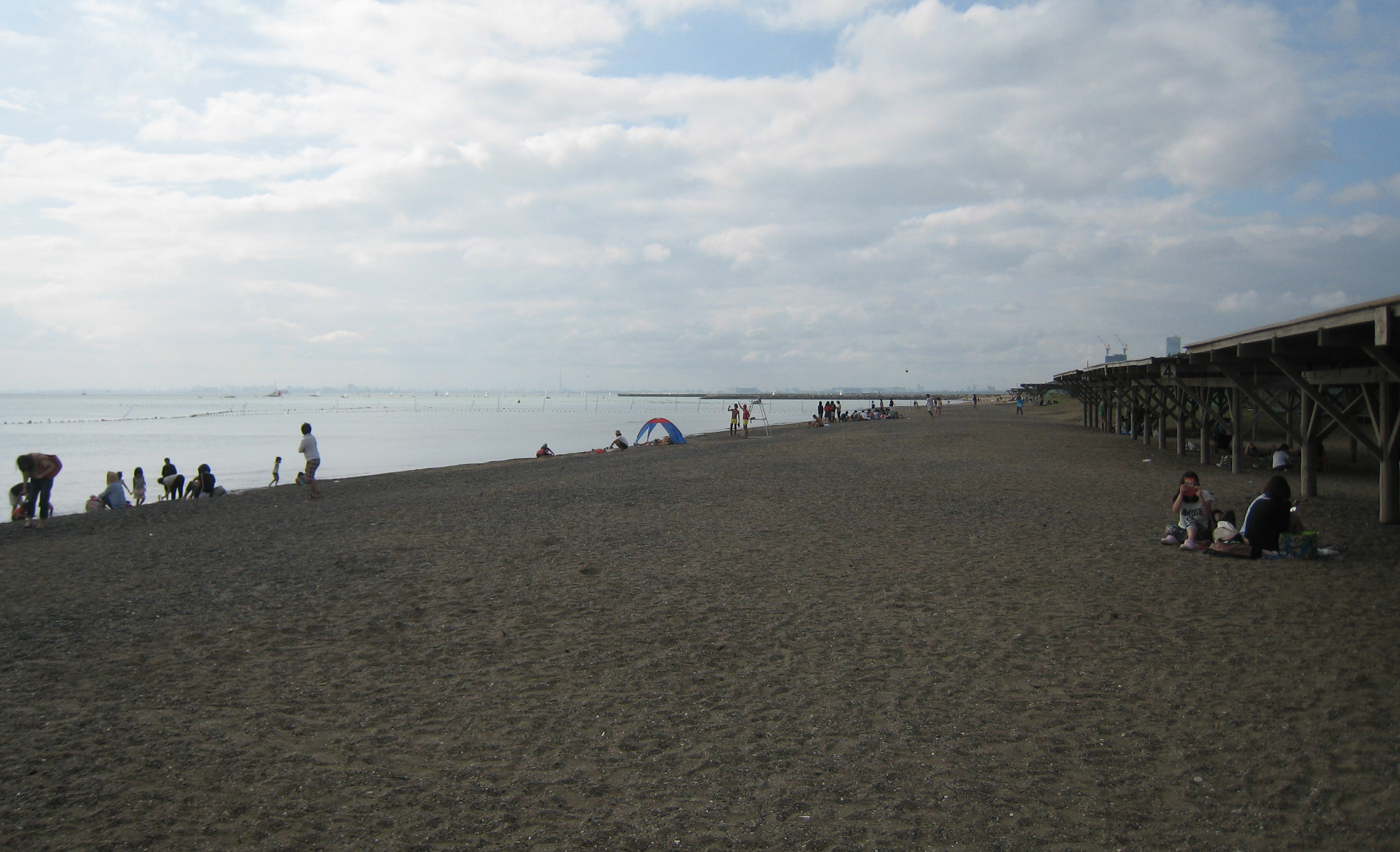
A beach in Chiba

== Politics ==
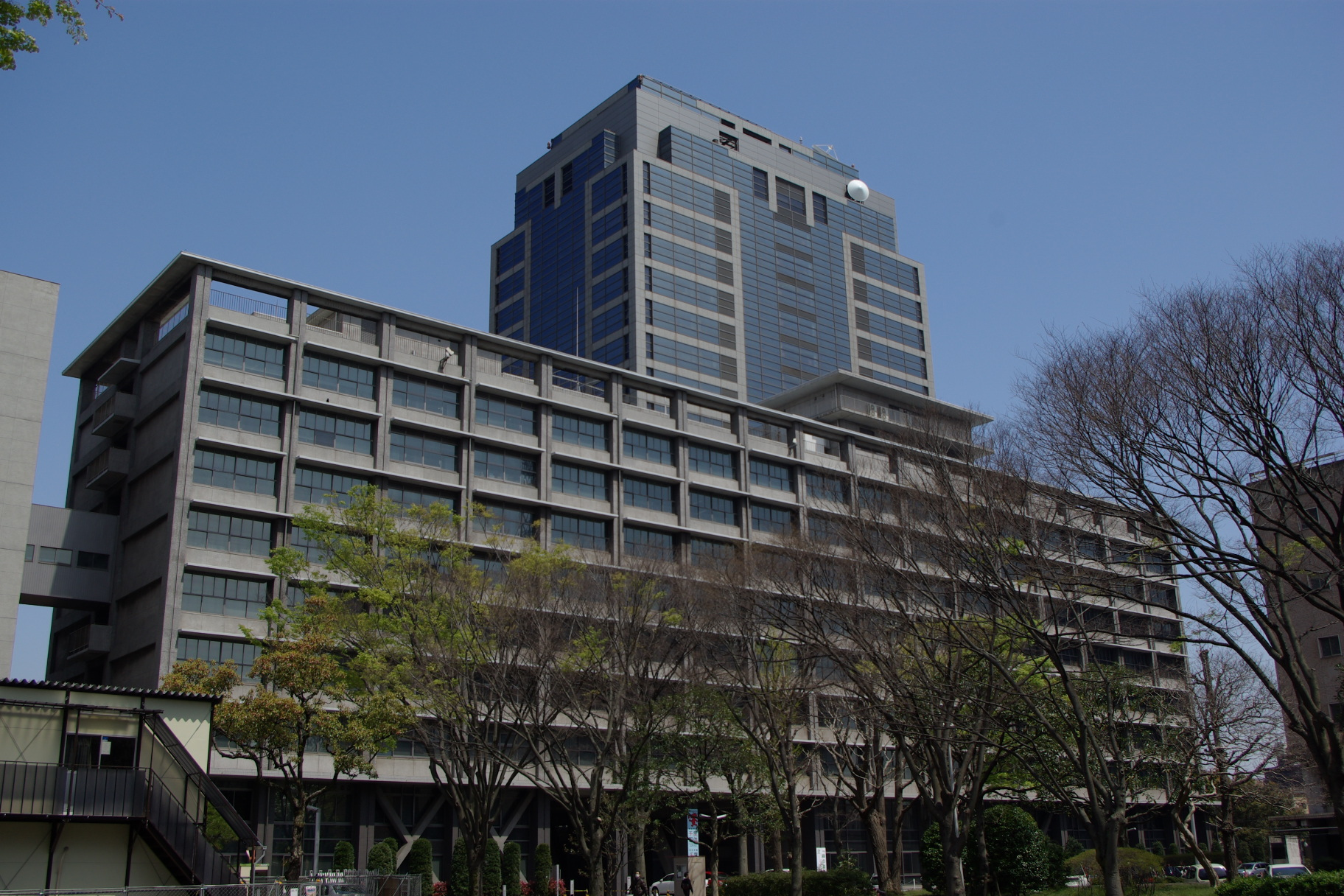
Main building of the prefectural government in Chiba City

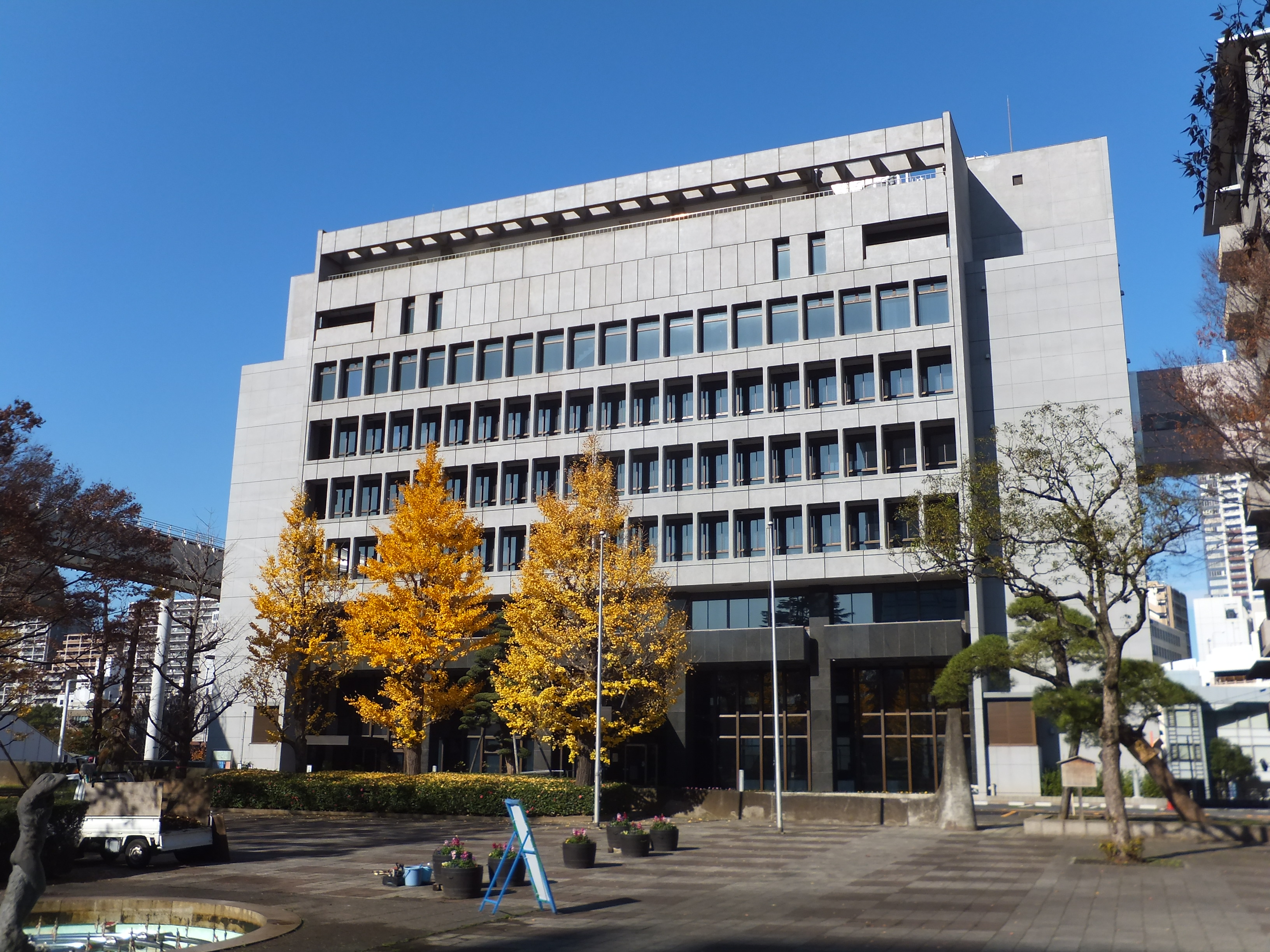
The prefectural assembly building

Since 2009, the prefectural governor is Eiji Suzuki, better known under his stage name as Kensaku Morita, former actor, member of the House of Representatives (LDP/Independent – Tokyo 4th district) and member of the House of Councillors (Independent – Tokyo). He was reelected overwhelmingly to a second term as governor in the March 2013 election against only a Communist challenger and a minor, unaffiliated independent.

The assembly of Chiba Prefecture has a regular membership of 95, elected in 45 electoral districts, currently still in the unified local election cycle of 1947 (last round 2011). As of July 2014, it is composed as follows: LDP 52 members, DPJ 13, Kōmeitō 7, JCP 4, Shimin Net/SDP/Independents 4, Your Party 3, four other caucuses with 5 members in total.

In the National Diet, Chiba is represented by 13 members from single-member districts in the House of Representatives, and six members (three at-large per election) in the House of Councillors. After the most recent Diet elections of 2010, 2012 and 2013, the prefecture is represented by eleven Liberal Democrats and two Democrats in the House of Representatives, and three Liberal Democrats, two Democrats, and one Your Party member in the House of Councillors. Current Diet members from Chiba include former prime minister Yoshihiko Noda (H.R., DPJ – 4th district) and former ministers Kuniko Inoguchi (H.C., LDP – class of 2010) and Motoo Hayashi (H.R., LDP – 10th district).

=== Local government ===
As of 2014, Chiba is divided into 54 contiguous municipalities (see list above): 37 cities, 16 towns and one village, as in all of postwar Japan each with a directly elected mayor and assembly. The most populous and Chiba's only designated major city is the capital Chiba City. Two cities, Funabashi and Kashiwa, are core cities. After late 20th century mergers, much of the rest of the prefecture is also organized in independent cities: Of the (today purely geographical) counties, only six remain, four of which have only one or two remaining towns or villages. After the reorganization of county and municipal governments in all prefectures in 1889/1890, there had initially been 12 counties and no city in Chiba; Chiba town in Chiba county became the first municipality in Chiba to be elevated to city status in 1921.

== Notable people ==
- Miri Ichika – gravure model and tarento
- Jun Ishikawa – composer
- Rioka Kanda – singer-songwriter, radio personality
- Yoshihiko Noda – politician, the 62nd Prime Minister of Japan
- Koseki Aquila Raphael – producer
- Yoshiko Sakakibara – voice actress
- Keita Sawa – racing driver
- Kei Shindō – voice actress
- Taiji – musician
- Hassei Takano – actor
- Toshi – singer
- Yoshiki – musician and songwriter
- Yuuri – singer-songwriter

== Police ==
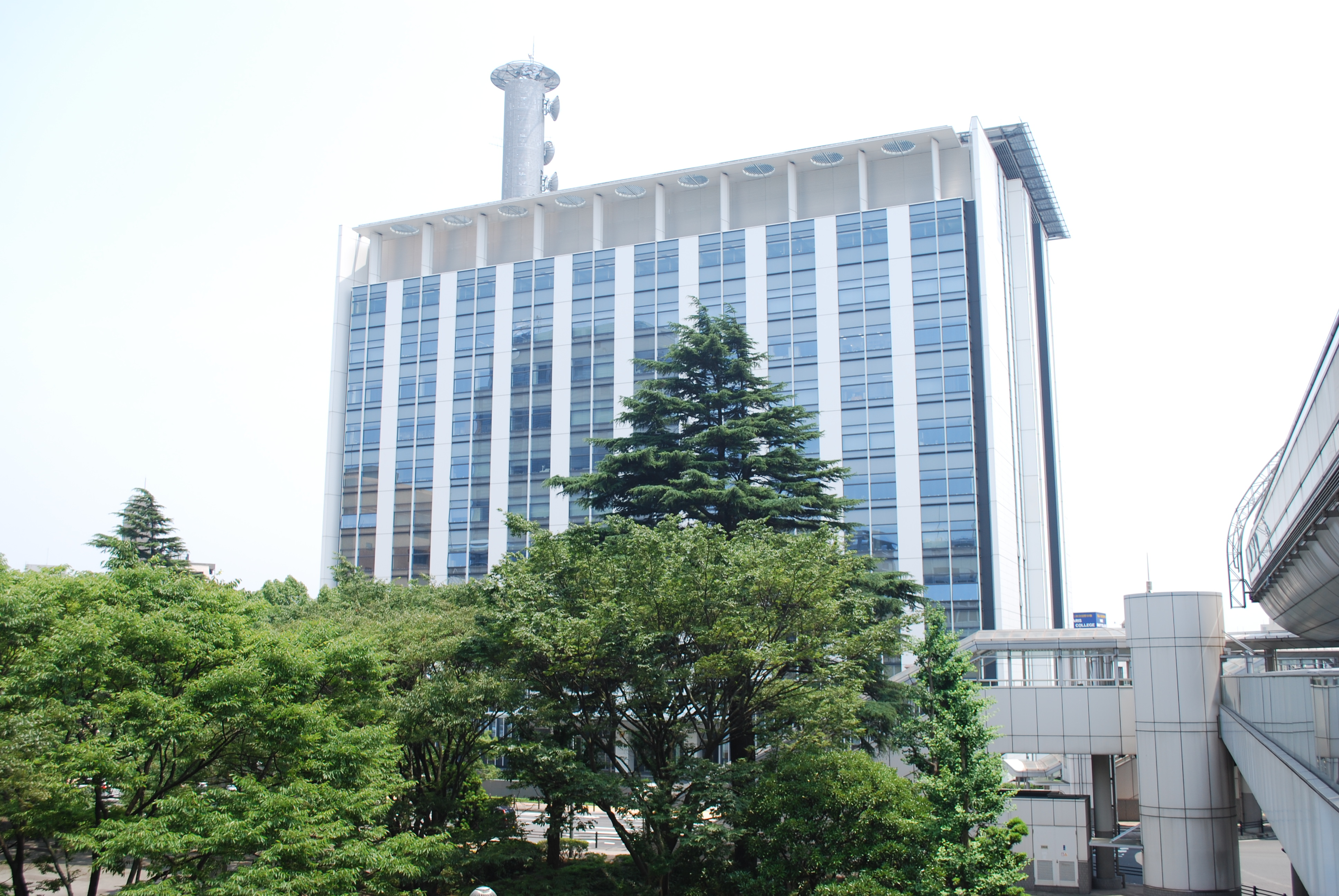
Chiba police HQ

While by far not as large as that of neighbouring Tokyo, Chiba's police force is amongst the country's tenth largest at more than 10,000 members (including the Narita airport police). As in every prefecture, the police are supervised by the public safety commission; its five members are appointed by the governor with approval by the assembly.

== International relations ==
Chiba Prefecture has a sister city relationship with:

- Wisconsin, United States, since 1990
- Wellingborough, Northamptonshire, United Kingdom
- Juanjuí, Peru
- Düsseldorf, Germany, since 2019

== In popular culture ==
- Films set in Chiba include The Eel (1997), winner of the Palme D'Or. Filming took place in Sawara.
- Novels set in Chiba include: Neuromancer by William Gibson (set in Chiba City), Ningen Shikkaku by Osamu Dazai (Funabashi), and Nogiku no Haka by Sachio Itō (Matsudo).
- Manga (comics) representations include: WataMote, Be Free!, Chameleon, Kyō Kara Ore Wa!!, Makuhari (set in Chiba city), Makuhari Saboten Campus (Chiba city), Susume!! Pirates and Urayasu Tekkin Kazoku (Urayasu).
- Anime (animation) representations include: The Family's Defensive Alliance (set in Funabashi), Battle Programmer Shirase (Narashino), My Teen Romantic Comedy SNAFU and Zegapain (Urayasu).
- TV series representations include: Kisarazu Cat's Eye (set in Kisarazu), Miotsukushi (Chōshi), Beach Boys (filmed in Tateyama and Shirahama (now Minamiboso) and Yappari Neko ga Suki (Chiba).
