= Miri Ichika =

Japanese gravure idol (born 1999)

- 未梨 一花
- Born: February 24, 1999 (age 27); Chiba Prefecture, Japan
- Other name: 爆乳高気圧 ("Big Breasts High Pressure")
- Occupations: Gravure model; tarento; actress
- Known for: 100 cm (39.37 in) bust
- Modeling information
- Height: 165 cm (5 ft 5 in)
- Hair color: Black
- Eye color: Brown
- Agency: Magnify Entertainment (business partnership)

Miri Ichika (未梨 一花, Ichika Miri; born 24 February 1999) is a Japanese gravure model, tarento, and actress from Chiba, Japan.

== Early life and career ==
Ichika said in a 2022 interview that her bust began to grow in middle school, causing her considerable embarrassment. After high school, Ichika worked part-time with no intention of beginning a career in entertainment, feeling herself to be merely "tall and big-breasted" and not beautiful. Scouted by the president of A & A Holdings, who saw potential in her, she made her gravure debut in late 2019 by winning the Sanspo GoGo Queen scouting competition. Her debut DVD, Milky Glamour, appeared that same year.

Since then, Ichika has won multiple awards for her gravure work, including 2021 MVP by Tokyo Lily. In addition to releasing books, DVDs, trading cards and other gravure works, Ichika has made appearances across a variety of media, including radio and broadcast television, as well as appearing on stage.

After taking a hiatus from gravure in 2023 to focus on her acting, Ichika announced her return to modeling beginning in March 2024.

She has played soft tennis since her youth and enjoys jigsaw puzzles. Ichika was friends with fellow gravure model Aoi Fujino. Her nominal measurements as of 2022 are 100I-63-95 (40I-25-37).

Formerly under contract with A & A Holdings, she now works as a freelancer.
