= Kuriyama River =

Japanese river

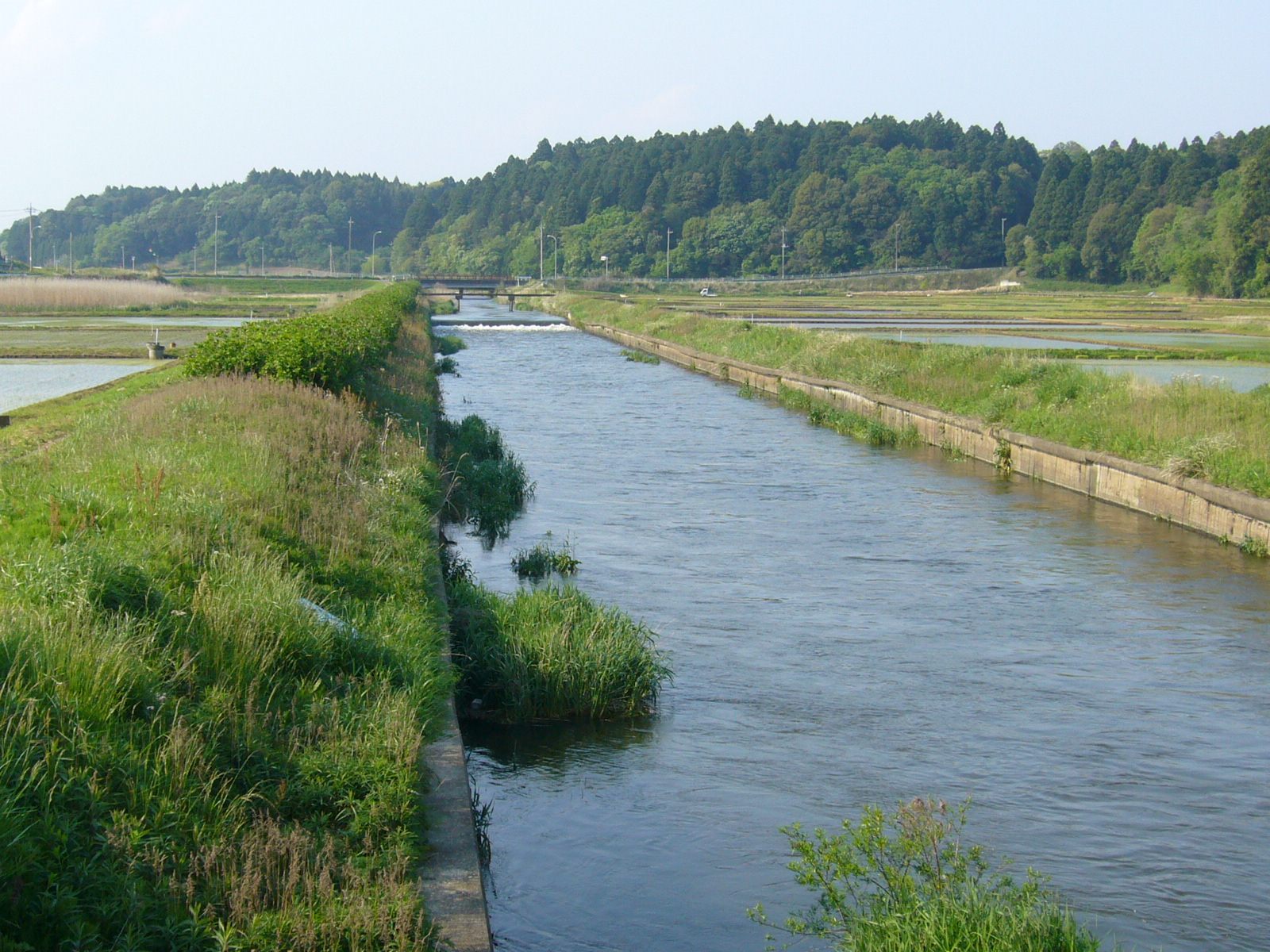
- Kuriyama River in Katori, Chiba Prefecture

- Native name: 栗山川 (Japanese)

Location
- Country: Japan

Physical characteristics
- Source
  - location: Shimōsa Plateau in Narita or Sawara, Katori, Chiba Prefecture
  - elevation: 30 m (98 ft)
- Mouth
  - location: Pacific Ocean at Yokoshibahikari, Chiba Prefecture
  - coordinates: 35°36′30.48″N 140°32′04.04″E
  - elevation: 0 m (0 ft)
- Length: 38.8 km (24.1 mi)
- Basin size: 292.3 km^{2} (112.9 sq mi)

The Kuriyama River (栗山川, Kuriyama-gawa) is a river in northeast Chiba Prefecture, Japan. It is 38.8 kilometers (24.1 mi) in length and has a drainage area of 292.3 square kilometers (112.9 sq mi), the second largest in Chiba Prefecture. Under the Rivers Act of 1906 the Kuriyama is designated as a Class 2 River. The Kuriyama is known as the southernmost river in Japan with a salmon run. The Yamakuragawa Fishing Port (栗山川漁港, Kuriyamagawa Gyokō) is located at the mouth of the river in Yokoshibahikari.

== Origin of name ==
By tradition, in the 7th century the former town of Kurihara, now part of Katori, saw an influx of immigrants from the Korean Peninsula. The area around the river was called 句麗山 (Kuriyama), a name and kanji character usage of likely origin from the Korean language. The river was later written with its current combination of two kanji characters. The first, 栗 means "chestnut", and the second, 山, means "mountain".

== Geography ==
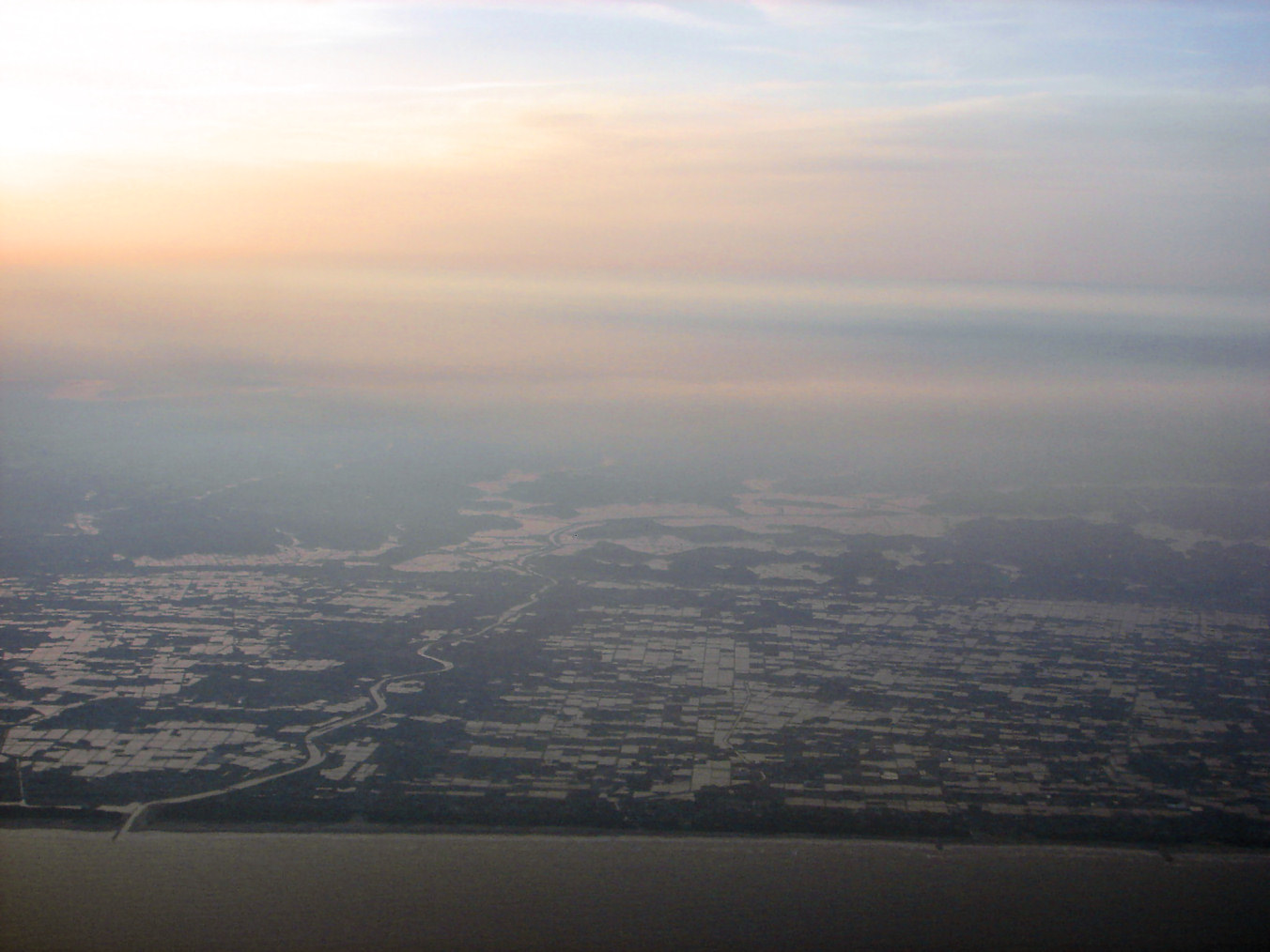
Aerial view of the mouth of the Kuriyama River

The source of the Kuriyama River is on the central Shimōsa Plateau in Narita or Sawara, Katori. Kurimoto, a former village in Katori, means "source of the Kuri." This area of northern Chiba Prefecture originally consisted of grassland and marshes, and was developed for agricultural use over time. The Kuriyama is connected to the Tone River by the Ryōsō Canal (80 kilometres (50 mi)), completed in 1967, which provides water for paddy irrigation. The Kuriyama River segment of the canal is called the Kuriyamagawa Canal (栗山川疎水路, Kuriyamagawa Kosuiro), and is 11.7 kilometres (7.3 mi) long. The drainage area of the Kuriyama crosses eight towns and cities across a wide part of northeastern Chiba Prefecture. They include Narita, Katori, Sōsa, Asahi, Tako, Shibayama, Sanmu, and Yokoshibahikari. The Kuriyama crosses the Kujūkuri Plain and pours into the Pacific Ocean at the midpoint of Kujūkuri Beach in Yokoshibahikari.

=== Tributaries ===
- Hirayama River (平山川, Hirayama-gawa)
- Yamakura River (山倉川, Yamakura-gawa)
- Jōban River (常盤川, Jōban-gawa)
- Numada River (沼田川, Numada-gawa)
- Kariate River (借当川, Kariate-gawa)
- Takohashi River (多古橋川, Takohashi-gawa)
- Takaya River (高谷川, Takaya-gawa)

== Salmon ==
The Kuriyama River is the southernmost river in Japan with a salmon run, and the salmon play an important part in the history and local culture of the Kuriyama River region. The rapid increase of population and industrial development on the tributaries of the Kuriyama have seriously reduced the number of salmon in the river. The Chiba prefectural government, as well as the municipalities of Katori, Tako, Shibayama, and Yokoshibahikari have formed the Kuriyama River Fisheries Association (栗山川漁業協同組合, Kuriyamagawa Gyogyō Kyōdō Kumiai) to reverse the trend. The association carries out capture and research operations from mid-October to late December at the Yokoshiba Dam in Yokoshibahikari during the salmon run. Researchers extract eggs from the salmon and carry out fertilization of the population. The association also carries out artificial fertilization and fry discharge projects. Residents in the Kuriyama River area interested in the repopulation of the salmon cooperate in the hatching, care and distribution of salmon hatchlings from late January until their release along the river in early March. The first fry discharge was carried out in 1977, and the first successful salmon run from the fry discharge was in 1980.

== History ==
The Kuriyama River area has been settled from very early in Japanese history. Excavation of the Iizuka Historic Remains Site, the Kashiwakuma Kofun Group, and the Ogawadai Kofun Group, located along the upper reaches of the Kuriyama and its tributaries, attest to the prosperity of northern Chiba Prefecture in the Kofun period (250 – 538). Excavation of kofun tumuli and other sites along the Kuriyama has revealed a wide variety of haniwa clay funerary objects, swords, horse bridles, and other implements of daily use typical of the period. The Kuriyama was later developed into shōen estates used for the production of rice. The upper areas of the river were part of the Katori ranch land, and the Takaya tributary of the Kuriyama was noted for its population of feral horses. The Yamakura Shrine and Yamakura Kanpuku-ji, both likely built in the early 9th century, have long held religious ceremonies associated with the Kuriyama River salmon. Kanpuku-ji was part of the Yamakura Shrine complex until their division shortly after the Meiji Restoration. In 1871, under the shinbutsu bunri separation of Buddhist temples and shrines, the shrine and temple were separated, but both continue to carry out ceremonies related to the salmon. The festival historically occurred in November with the coming of the salmon up the Kuriyama. The Yamakura Shrine festival is known as the Yamakura Salmon Festival (山倉の鮭祭り, Yamakura no Sake-matsuri), and is held on the first Sunday of December.

== Use ==
The entirety of the Kuriyama River provides irrigation to paddy fields. Areas along the river were historically rich in rice production, and remain so today. Farms along the Kuriyama have diversified from rice and other grain production to vegetable farming, notably of sweet potatoes. The Edo period ranches no longer exist on the upper reaches of the Kuriyama, but pig farming is still carried out along the upper reaches of the river in Katori.

== Recreation ==
The Kuriyama River is a popular fishing spot. Carp, Carassius, the Crucian carp and flathead mullet are all found in great quantity. The fishing of salmon, formerly widespread along the Kuriyama, is now limited due to the decrease of the salmon population. Cities and towns along the river now consider the Kuriyama a precious commodity, and fishing events are held in relation to the salmon catch in each town and city.

== 2011 Tōhoku earthquake and tsunami ==
The Kuriyama River was inundated by a tsunami caused by the 2011 Tōhoku earthquake and tsunami on March 3, 2011. The tsunami traveled up the river. Flooding from the tsunami, while insignificant compared to other regions of Japan, damaged river embankments, homes and the Yamakuragawa Fishing Port across the lower part of the river.
