= Shibayama Kofun Haniwa Museum =

Museum in Shibayama, Chiba, Japan

- 芝山町立芝山古墳・はにわ博物館
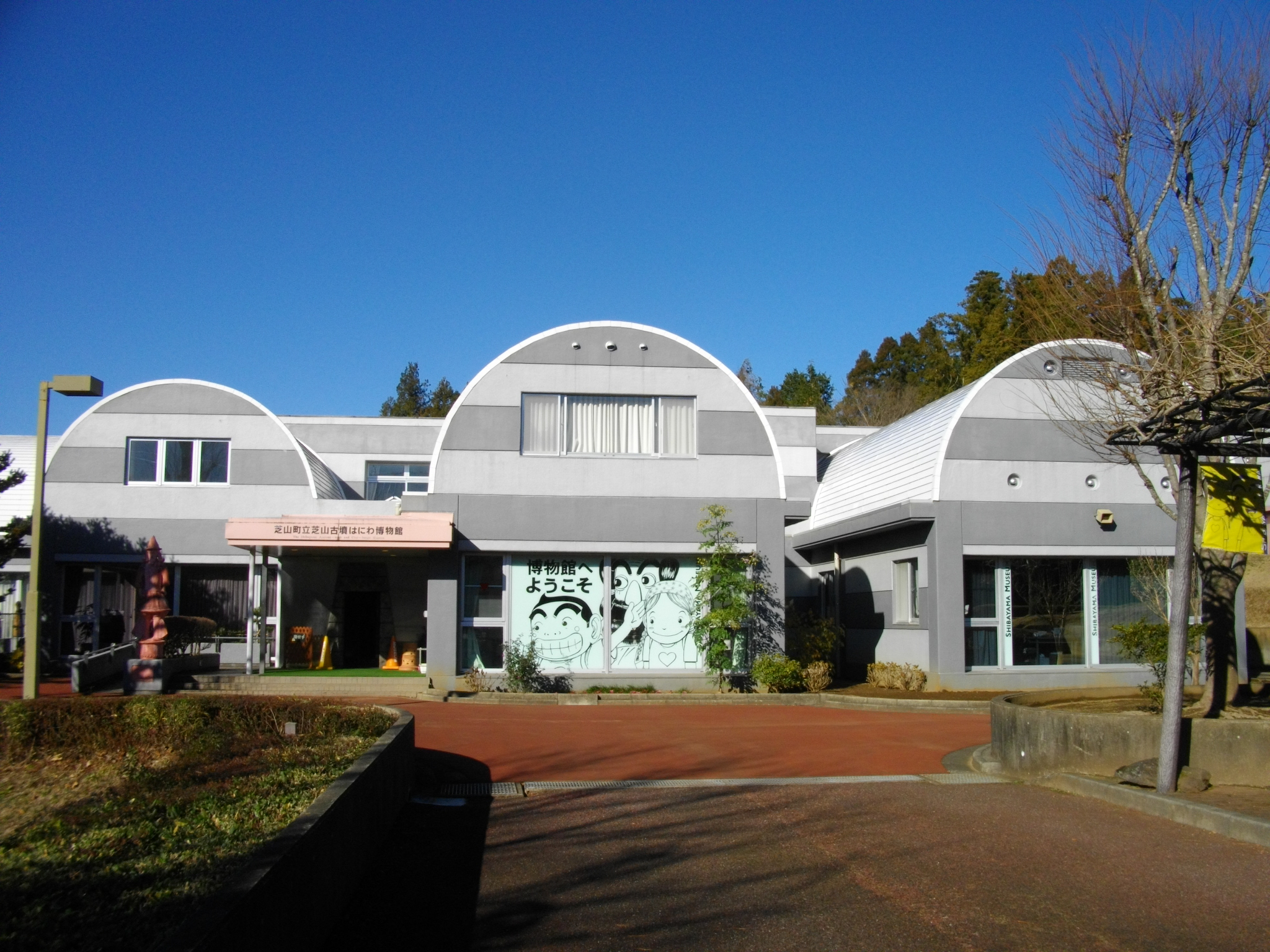
- Interactive map of the Shibayama Kofun Haniwa Museum area

General information
- Location: 438-1 Shibayama, Shibayama, Chiba Prefecture, Japan
- Coordinates: 35°41′39″N 140°25′43″E
- Opened: 1 May 1988

Website
- Official website (in Japanese)

Shibayama Kofun Haniwa Museum (Japanese: 芝山町立芝山古墳・はにわ博物館, Hepburn: Shibayama Chōritsu Shibayama Kofun・Haniwa Hakubutsukan) opened in Shibayama, Chiba Prefecture, Japan in 1988. The collection and displays focus on the area's numerous kofun and haniwa, among them Tonozuka Kofun and Himezuka Kofun in the Shibayama Kofun Cluster.

== See also ==
- List of Historic Sites of Japan (Chiba)
- National Museum of Japanese History
- Museum of Aeronautical Science
