= Shibayama =

Shibayama may refer to:

- Shibayama, Chiba, a town in Japan
- Shibayama Railway, a railway company in Chiba Prefecture, Japan
- Tsutomu Shibayama, Japanese anime director
- Shibayama, a technique to decorate objects named after its inventor
