= Shimōsa Plateau =

Plateau in Chiba Prefecture, Japan

Shimōsa Plateau 下総台地 Shimōsa-daichi
- Plateau
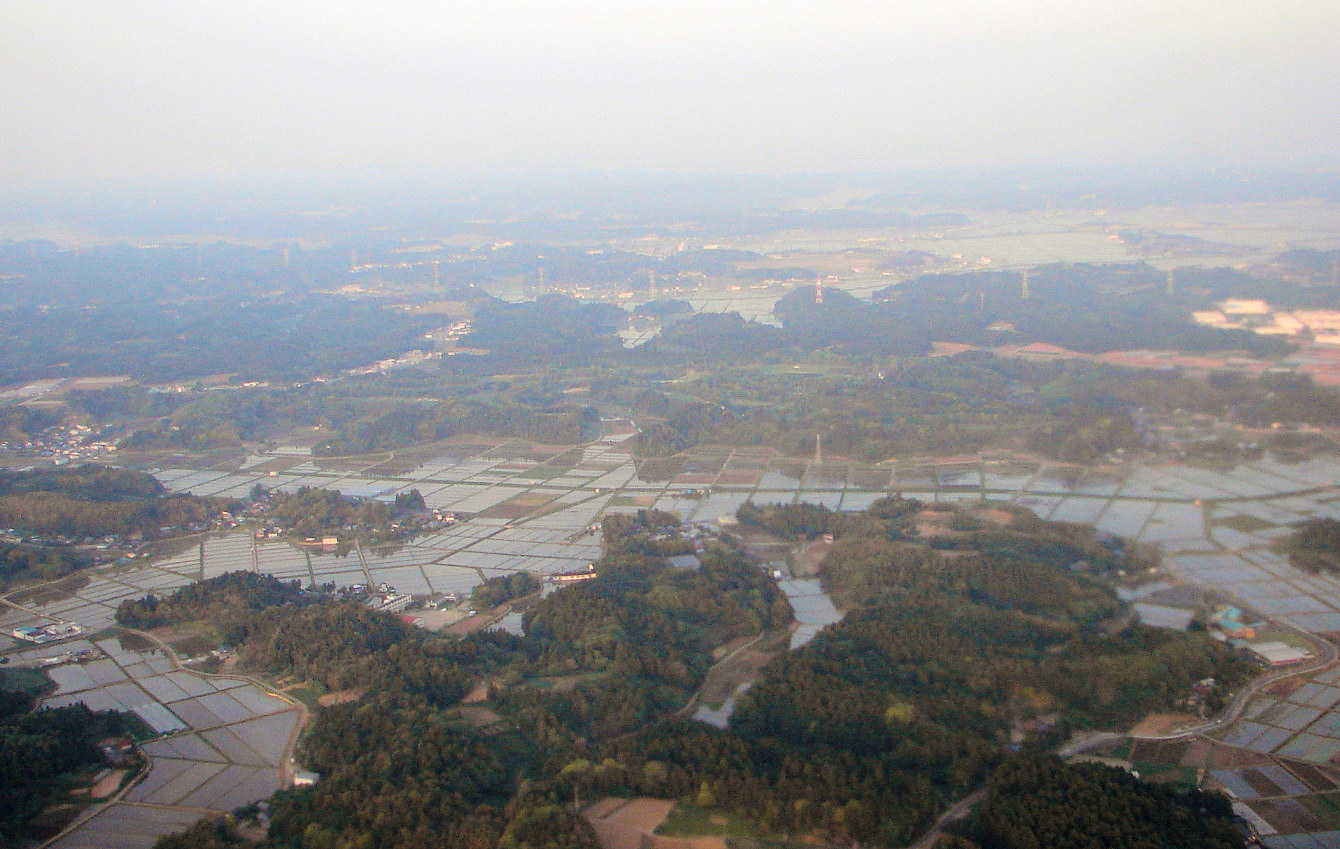
- Rice paddies on Shimōsa Plateau, Shibayama, Chiba Prefecture

- Coordinates: 35°45′N 140°20′E
- Location: Kantō Region, Chiba Prefecture
- Part of: Kantō Plain

The Shimōsa Plateau (下総台地, Shimōsa-daichi) is a plateau on the Kantō Plain in central Honshu, Japan. The plateau covers most of northern Chiba Prefecture. The plateau was historically richly agricultural, but in the 20th century the western and central Shimōsa Plateau became one of the major industrial areas of Japan, as well as a large-scale bedroom community of the Tokyo Metropolitan Region. Narita International Airport is located in the center of the Shimōsa Plateau.

== Geography ==
The Shimōsa Plateau covers most of northern Chiba Prefecture. It ranges between 10 metres (33 ft) and 150 metres (490 ft) above sea level. While the Shimōsa Plateau has no set boundaries, it ranges roughly south to north from the Bōsō Hill Range to the lowlands of the Tone River, and east from the Edo River west to the lowlands of Kujūkuri Beach. It runs from Funabashi to Katori.

=== Geology ===
Shimōsa Plateau sits above the Shimōsa Group (下総層群, Shimōsa-sōgun), a geological group under the Bōsō Peninsula. The Shimōsa Group dates from the Tertiary and Pleistocene periods, and is roughly divided into the Jizodo, Yabu, and Narita formations. The geological group consists primarily of sedimentary layers of loose sand, and secondarily of clay silt and pebbly-sand layers. Above the Shimōsa Group are more recent rich, fertile layers of volcanic ash. The Shimōsa Plateau yields great deposits of fossils, notably molluscan fossils, as the plateau was originally submerged under water.

=== Rivers and lakes ===
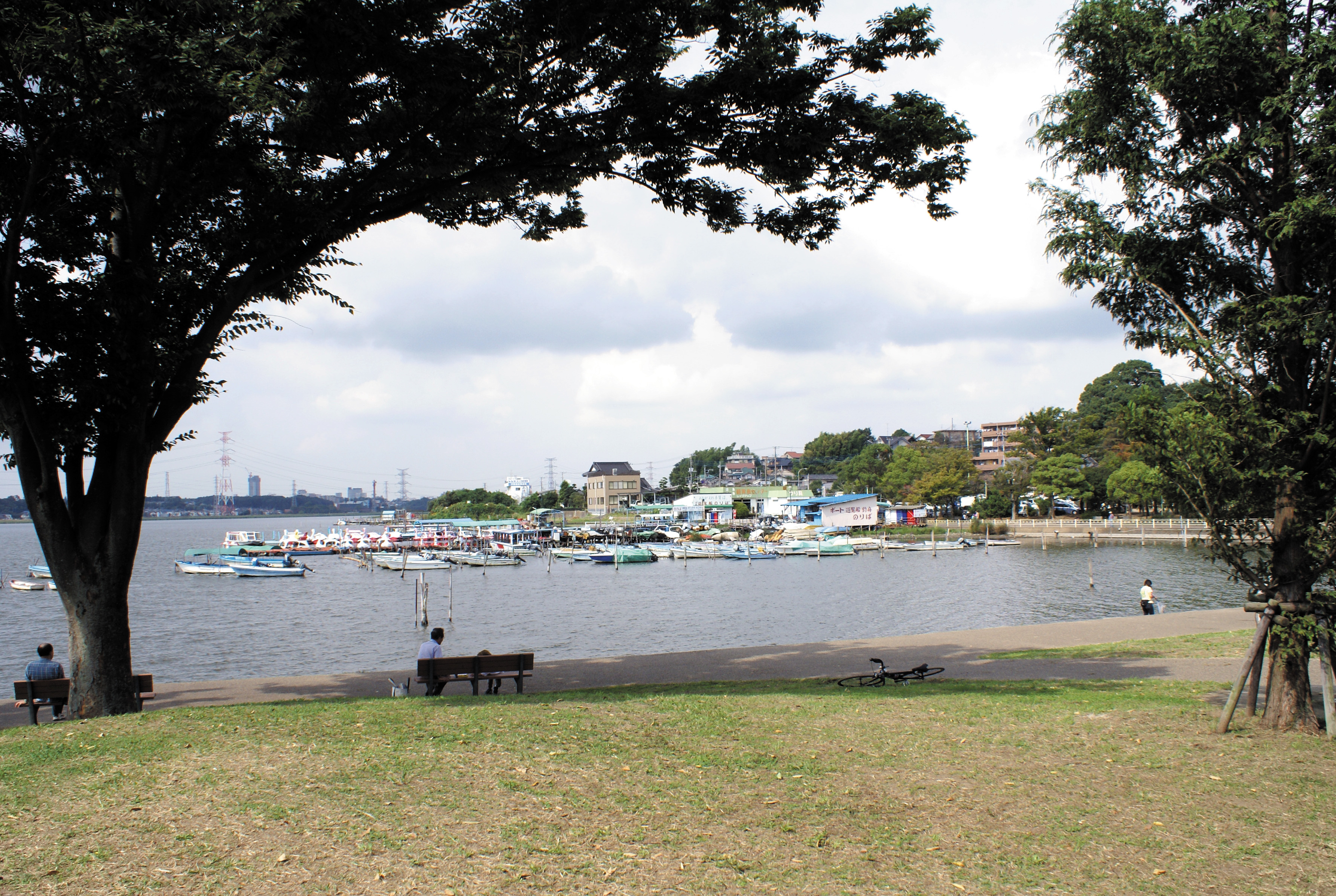
Lake Teganuma, Abiko

The Shimōsa Plateau is crossed by several short, shallow rivers and two small lakes. The Kuriyama River (38.8 kilometres (24.1 mi)) flows eastward from the central area of the plateau east of Narita International Airport to the Pacific Ocean. The shorter Kido River (21.5 kilometres (13.4 mi)) similarly flows eastward and empties into the Pacific Ocean in the city of Sanmu.

Lake Teganuma originally occupied a large area to the north of the plateau, but has narrowed in modern times due to being sealed off from the Tone River and land reclamation projects. Teganuma historically covered 10 square kilometres (3.9 mi^{2}), but after land reclamation now covers 3.7 square kilometres (1.4 mi^{2}). Lake Inba was created by the natural damming of a small valley in the Shimōsa Plateau, and originally covered 21.3 square kilometres (8.2 mi^{2}). After land reclamation projects, similar to those carried out on Teganuma, it now covers 13.1 square kilometres (5.1 mi^{2}).

=== Parks ===
Suigo-Tsukuba Quasi-National Park sits to the northeast of the Shimōsa Plateau in Chiba and Ibaraki prefectures. The park was established on March 3, 1953, and protects natural areas and cultural heritage of, among other areas, the Tone River basin directly to the north of the plateau. Imba-Teganuma Prefectural Natural Park was established to protect Lakes Tega and Inba, and is located at the north of the plateau.

== History ==
=== Early history ===
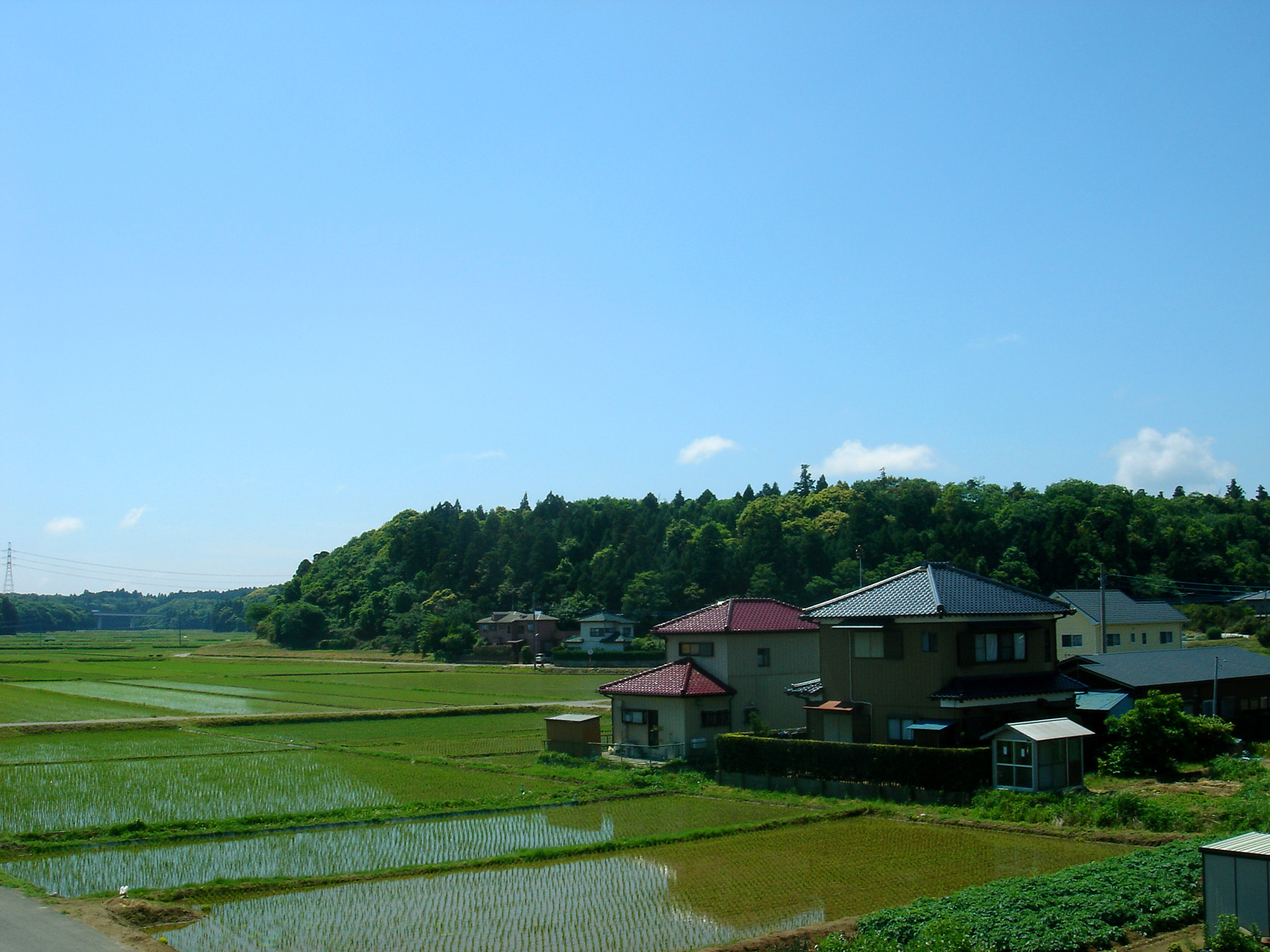
Rice paddies, Sawara, Katori

The Shimōsa Plateau has supported a population since ancient times, as evidenced by the large concentration of Jōmon period kaizuka or shell middens across the plateau. The plateau was historically located in Shimōsa Province, after which it was named, and was a productive agricultural area prior to the industrialization of Japan. The area served to produce rice and vegetables as early as the Nara period. Ranches on the Shimōsa Plateau flatlands were developed to raise horses. Additionally, the network of rivers and canals provided for the inland transport of marine products from the Pacific Ocean to Edo. During the Edo period the Shimōsa Plateau saw large-scale development of new rice paddies by the Tokugawa shogunate, as well as the further development of horse ranches, specifically the Kogane and Sakura ranches to supply horses to the shogunate. The inland water routes from Chōshi were developed to supply rice, marine products, and vegetables directly to the capital at Edo.

=== Modern period ===
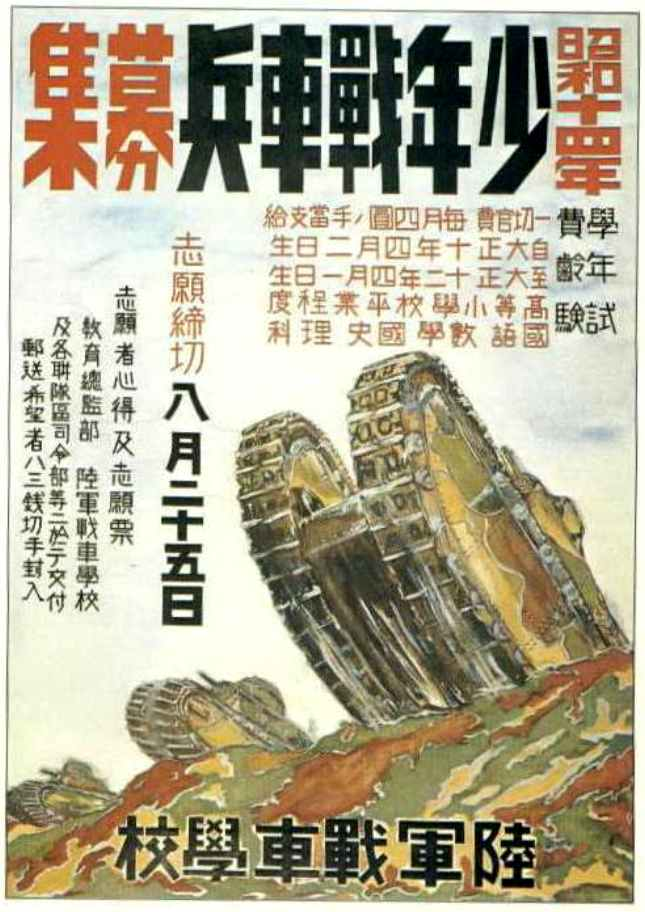
Recruitment poster for the Tank School of the Imperial Japanese Army, formerly in Inage-ku, City of Chiba

The economic development of the Shimōsa Plateau continued after the Meiji restoration of 1868. An extensive rail network was established and replaced the slower canal routes to the capital. Some of undeveloped areas in this plateau, including former ranches of shogunate, turned into military facility of Imperial Japanese Army (Narashinohara), imperial farm (Sanrizuka, Narita), or agricultural colonies, the aid for unemployed Shizoku. Those colonies named after development order, such as:

- Hatsutomi (初富, Kamagaya)
- Futawa (二和, Funabashi)
- Misaki (三咲, Funabashi)
- Toyoshiki (豊四季, Kashiwa)
- Gokō (五香, Matsudo)
- Mutsumi (六実, Matsudo)
- Nanae (七栄, Tomisato)
- Yachimata (八街, Yachimata)
- Kumiage (九美上, Katori)
- Tokura (十倉, Tomisato)
- Toyoichi (十余一, Shiroi)
- Toyofuta (十余二, Kashiwa)
- Toyomi (十余三, Narita, Tako)

During the militarization of northern Chiba Prefecture that began in the early 20th century, the eastern area of the plateau was declared a military zone. The Shimōsa Plateau was a center of the manufacture of war goods, notably of munitions and military aircraft, and saw the construction of numerous military facilities. Shimofusa Air Base was constructed in 1945 by the Imperial Japanese Army Air Force on the border of Kashiwa and Kamagaya. Most of the military facilities and industrial areas on the Shimōsa Plateau were destroyed by Allied bombing during World War II.

=== Post-World War II ===
In the period immediately following World War II the plateau remained agricultural. Primary industry, almost entirely agriculture, accounted for 63% of economic activity, secondary accounted for 12%, and tertiary 25%. Post-war industrial planning resulted in large-scale development of coastal areas on the eastern Shimōsa Plateau along Tokyo Bay. Fishing and agricultural areas along the bay were replaced by landfill. The scenery of the eastern plateau went from largely agricultural to a vast area of factory smokestacks and high-rise housing. The development of sprawling port facilities, originally centered on the city of Chiba, culminated in the establishment of Keiyō Industrial Zone. Manufacturing facilities were developed across the central Shimōsa Plateau in the same period.

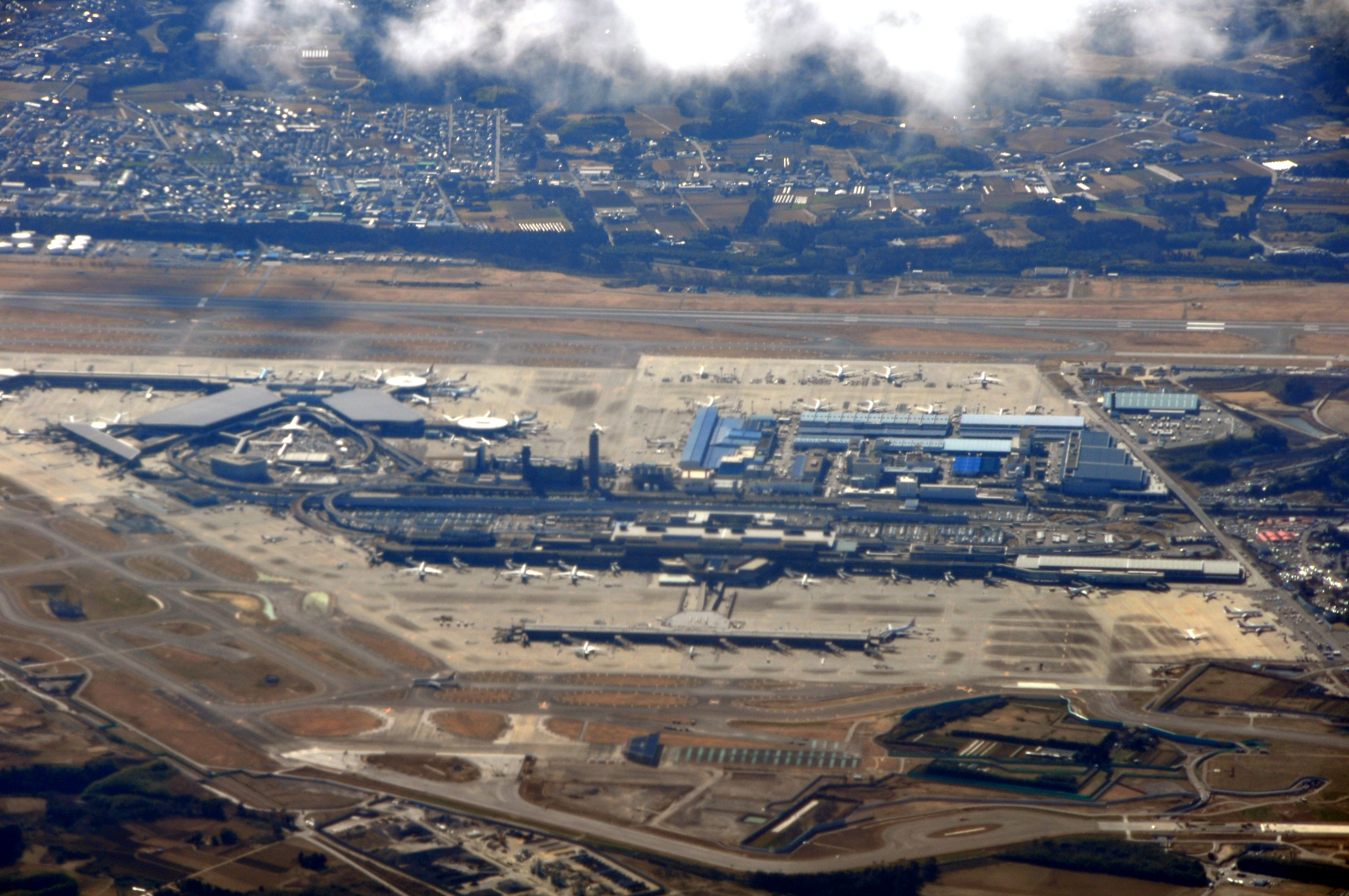
Aerial view of Narita International Airport

Immediately after World War II, the transportation system of northern Chiba Prefecture was significantly improved. The rail network connecting northern Chiba Prefecture to Tokyo was expanded, allowing the construction of large-scale housing facilities, and northern Chiba Prefecture became a bedroom community of metropolitan Tokyo. The construction of Narita International Airport between 1972 and 1978 resulted in further economic development and population increase on the central Shimōsa Plateau.

In contrast to the large-scale economic development of the western and central Shimōsa Plateau, other parts of Chiba Prefecture saw relatively little economic development and ultimately long-term population decline, notably on the eastern Shimōsa Plateau, the Kujūkuri Plain, and entirety of the southern Bōsō Peninsula.

== Economy ==
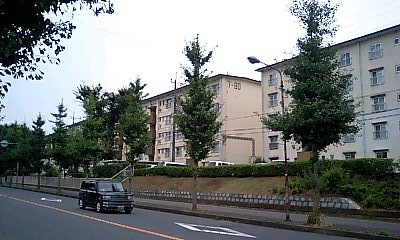
Danchi housing complex, Abiko

The Shimōsa Plateau remains an important economic center of Japan. Compared to the post-war period, the distribution of economic activity on the plateau has changed. Primary industry accounts for only 5% of economic activity, secondary accounted for 27%, and tertiary 68%. Tertiary industry on the plateau consists of both the service industry serving the densely populated areas of northern Chiba Prefecture, as well as the extensive logistics network connecting the Keiyō Industrial Zone and Narita International Airport with other areas of Japan. While agriculture accounts for a small part of the overall economy on the Shimōsa Plateau, the northern and eastern area of the plateau is a large producer of vegetables for the Tokyo Metropolitan Region. The flat, eastern part of the Shimōsa Plateau continues to support rice production.
