= Suigō Sawara Aquatic Botanical Garden =

Botanical garden in Katori, Chiba, Japan

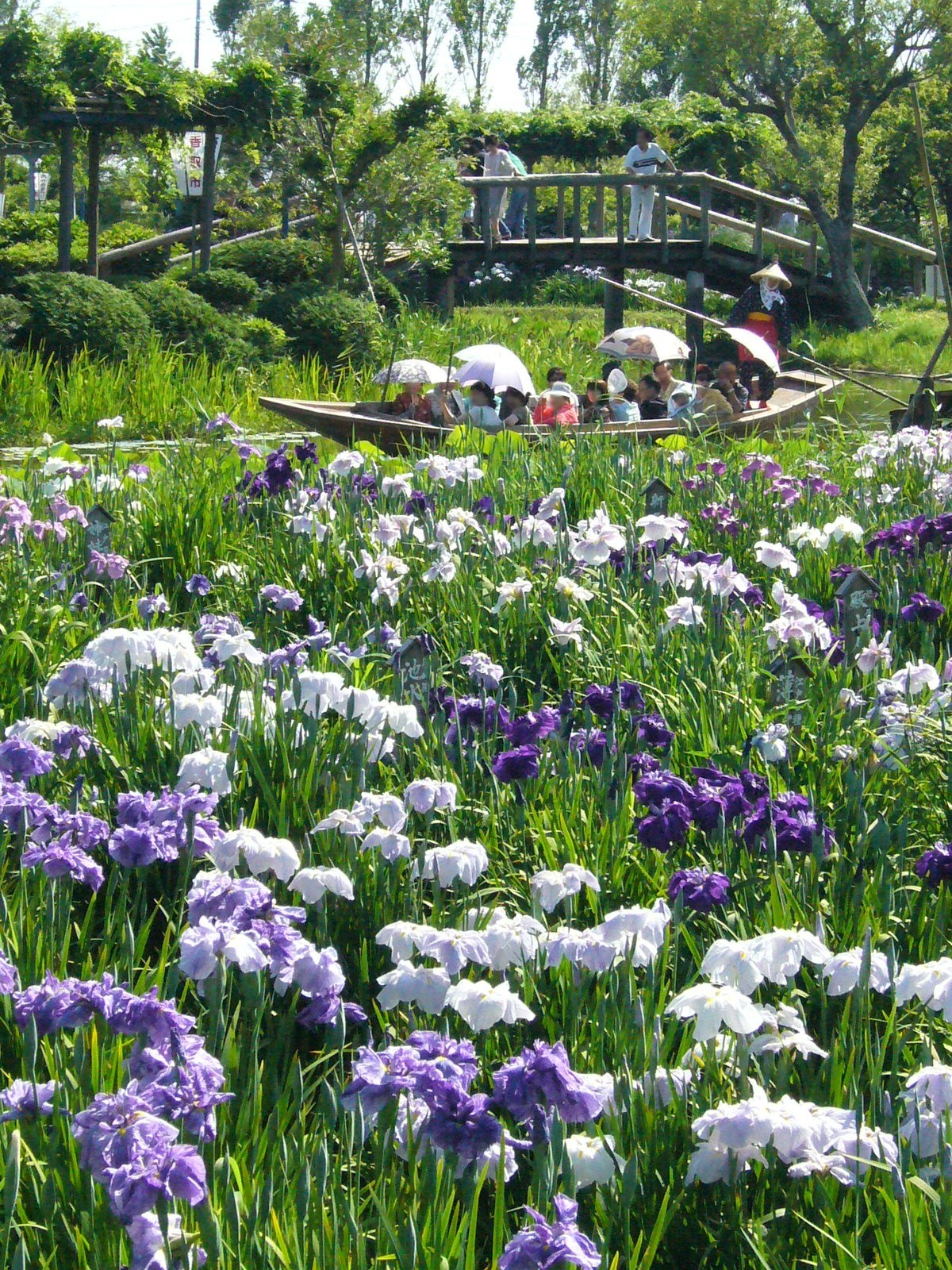
- Suigō Sawara Aquatic Botanical Garden
- Interactive map of Suigō Sawara Aquatic Botanical Garden
- Type: Public
- Location: Katori, Chiba, Japan
- Coordinates: 35°55′40.73″N 140°31′27.70″E
- Created: 1969
- Operator: Suigo-Tsukuba Quasi-National Park

The Suigō Sawara Aquatic Botanical Garden (水郷佐原水生植物園, Suigō Sawara Suisei-shokubutsu-en) is a botanical garden located at the eastern side of the Suigo-Tsukuba Quasi-National Park in Katori, Chiba, Japan. It is open 9 a.m.-4:30 p.m. (8 a.m.-7 p.m. during the Iris Festival) every day in May and June. July through April it is closed every Monday and from Dec.24 through Jan.4. Admission is charged.

The garden opened in 1969 and features a wide assortment of aquatic plants. It is best known for its iris and lotus collections, comprising about 1.5 million irises of 350 varieties, and more than 300 varieties of lotus. The irises are at their best in June, and the lotuses in August.

== See also ==
- List of botanical gardens in Japan
