= Museum of Aeronautical Science =

Coordinates: 35.7402°N 140.3980°E

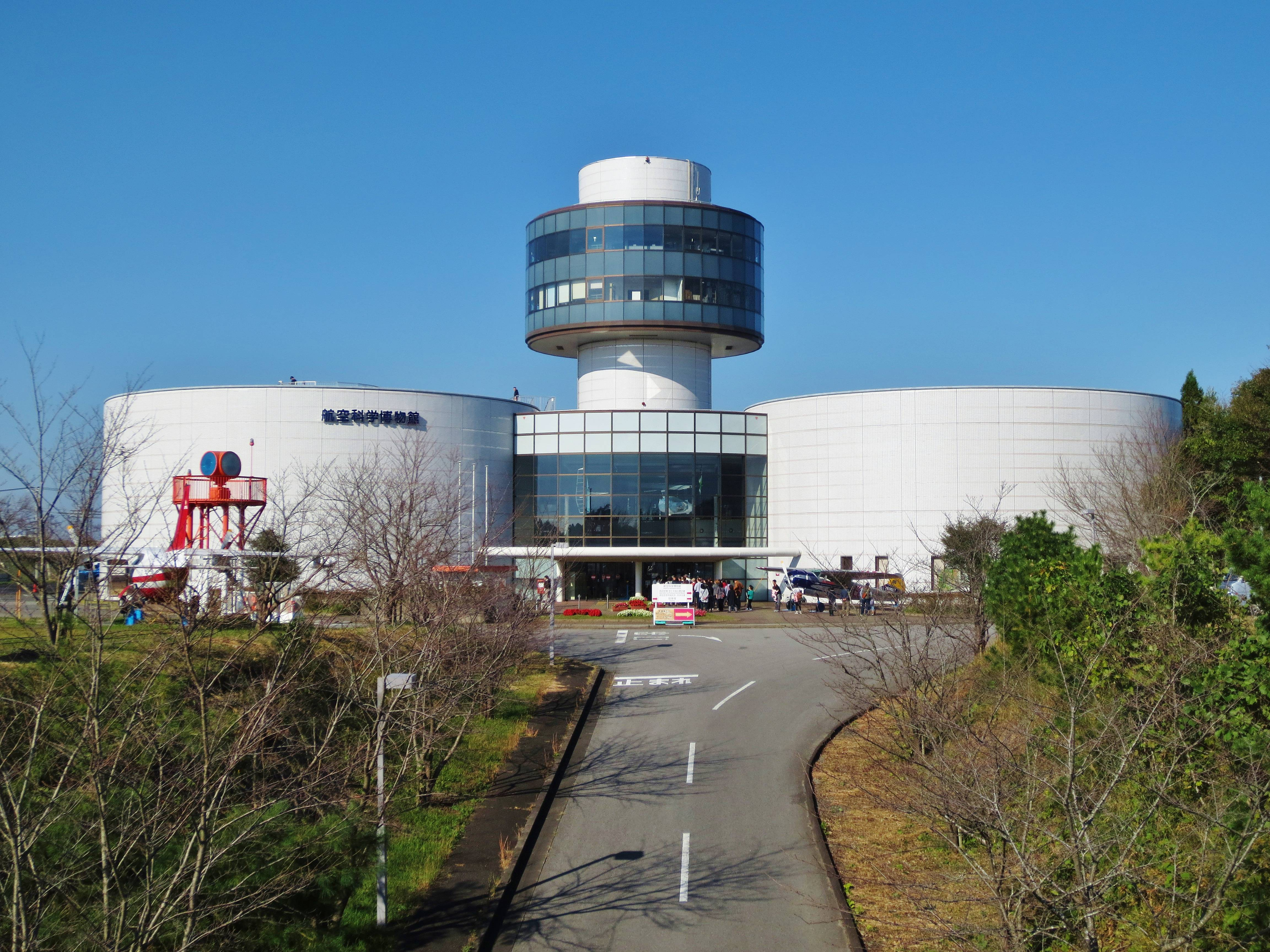
- Facility appearance
- Established: 1 August 1989
- Type: Aviation museum
- Website: www.aeromuseum.or.jp

The Museum of Aeronautical Science (航空科学博物館) is an aviation museum located in Shibayama, Chiba prefecture, Japan. It is near Narita International Airport. It opened in 1989.

== Indoor display area ==
=== Main hall ===
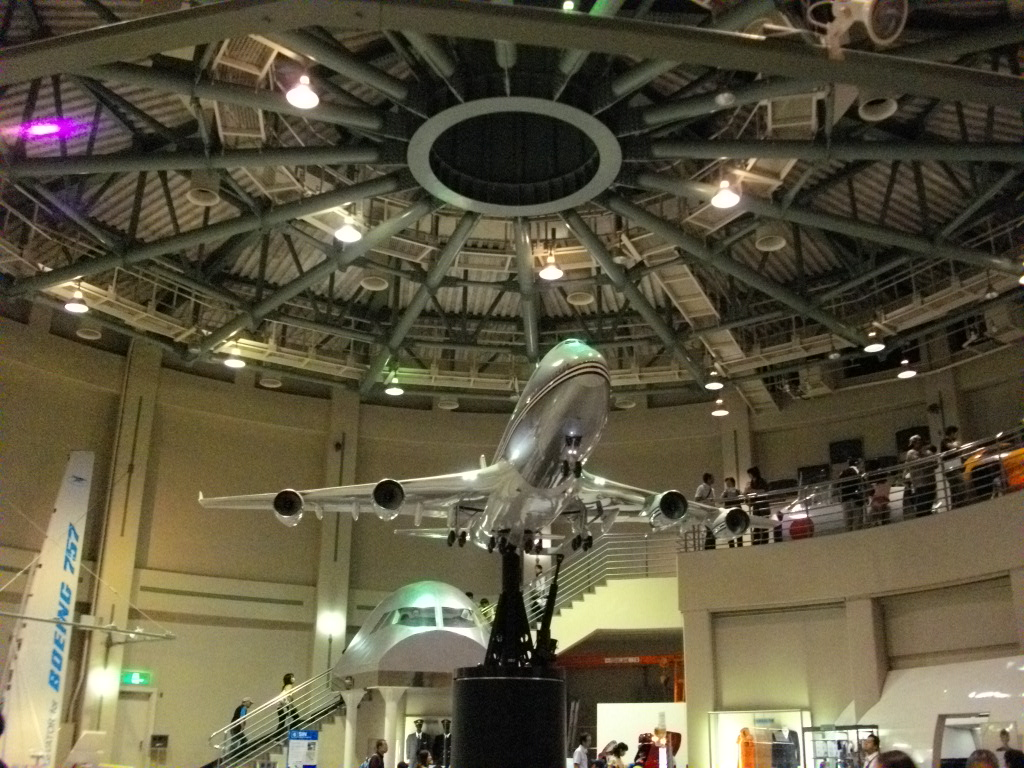

The first and second floors feature a variety of exhibits related to aircraft and aviation. These include components of the Boeing 747 (a section of the main wing, a JT9D engine, a cross-section of the fuselage, and cargo containers), a full-scale passenger cabin mock-up, and a model of the adjacent Narita International Airport. At the centre of the exhibition space, there is a model of a Boeing 747-400 prototype. A DC-8 flight simulator is also available.

=== Upper floors ===
The fourth and fifth floors are designed to resemble an air traffic control tower. The fourth floor houses the observation restaurant Balloon. The fifth floor is an observation deck, where visitors can watch aircraft land and take off while listening to explanations by staff. This floor also has airport control equipment that was previously used in actual operations.

=== Boeing 747 Nose Section Exhibit ===
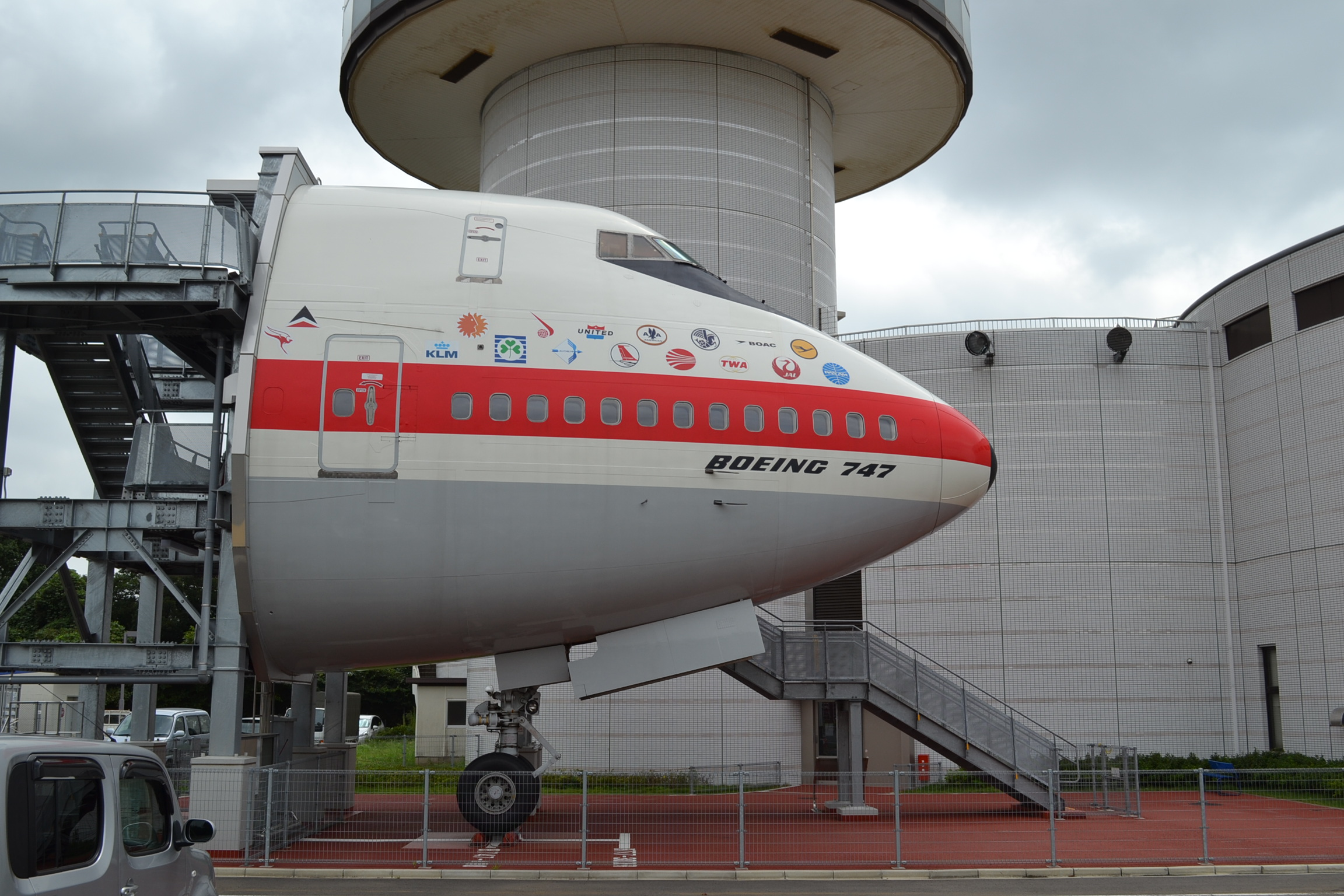
N642NW on display

Commemorating the country's aviation history as the largest operator of the Boeing 747 at one time, plans were made around 2008 to preserve an example of the iconic aircraft at the museum. It was decided that the museum would acquire a retired Boeing 747 stored in America, disassemble it, transport it by sea, and reassemble it on-site. An ex-Northwest Airlines airframe, Boeing 747-212B (N642NW), was selected for the project and transported from Pinal Airpark in late 2010. The reassembly was completed in July 2011 by engineers from Japan Airlines.

== Outdoor display area ==
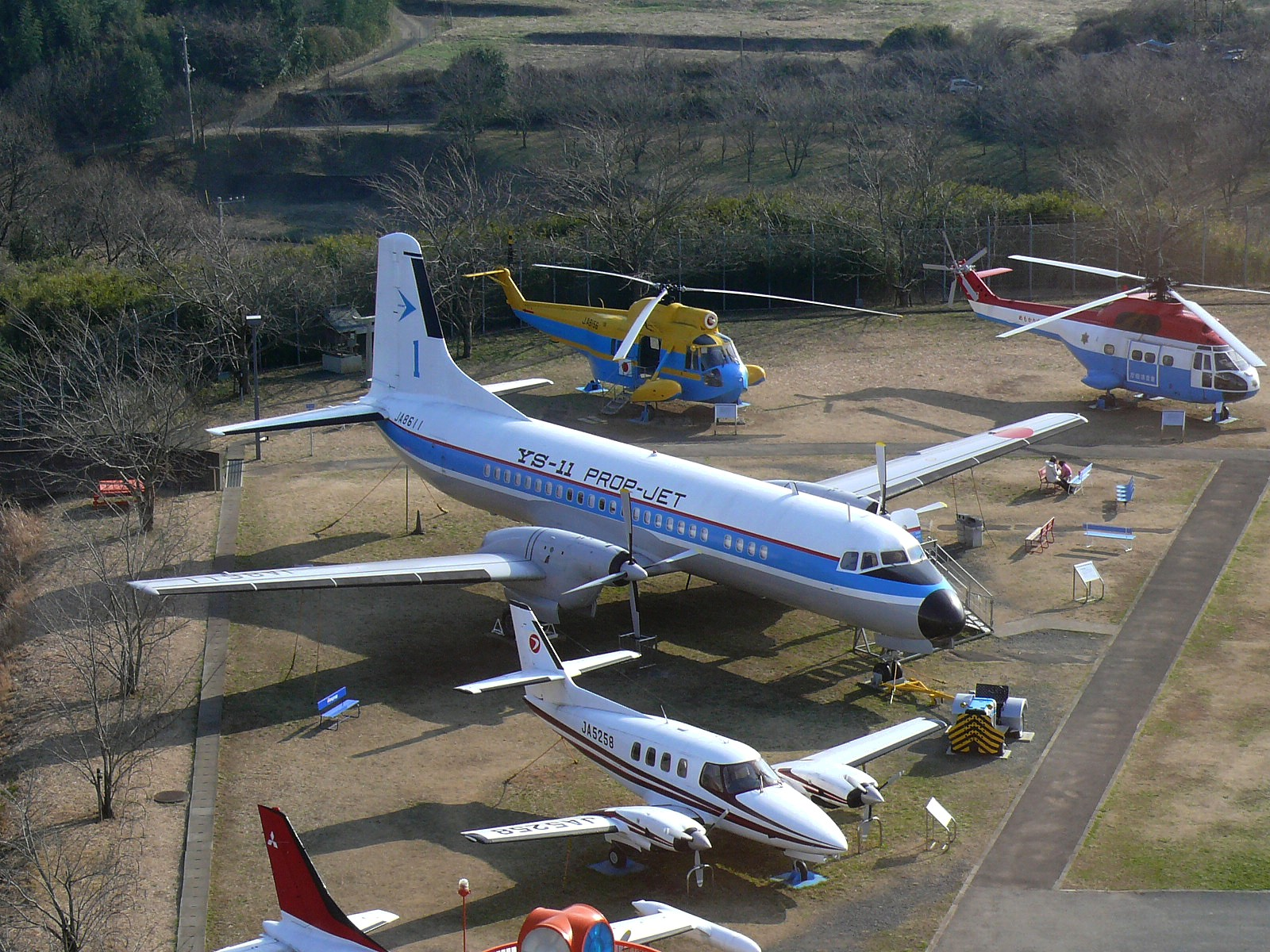
NAMC YS-11 and other aircraft on display

- Cessna 195
- Mitsubishi MU-2
- Fuji/Rockwell Commander 700
- NAMC YS-11
- Sikorsky S-62
- Kamov Ka-26
- Cessna 411
- Beechcraft Bonanza
- Learjet
- Aero Commander 680
- Robinson R22
- Cessna 175
- Aerospatiale SA 330 Puma
- Mooney M20
- Cessna 421
- Beechcraft Turbo Baron

== See also ==
- List of aviation museums
