= Kurobe River (Chiba) =

Coordinates: 35°50′3″N 140°41′57″E

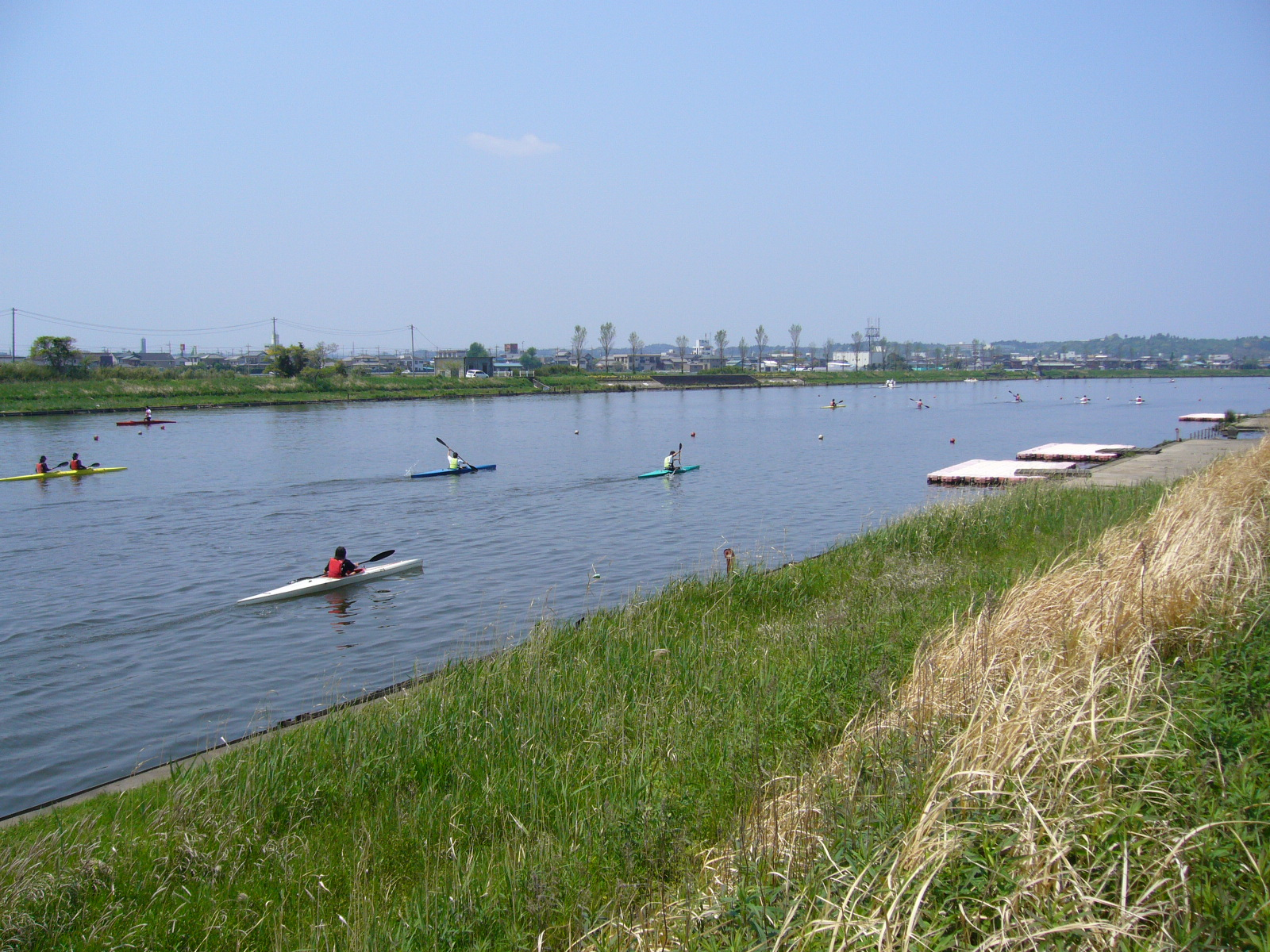
- Rowing on the Kurobe River

- Location within Japan
- Native name: 黒部川 (Japanese)

Location
- Country: Japan

Physical characteristics
- Source
  - location: Katori and Asahi, Chiba Prefecture
- Mouth
  - location: Pacific Ocean
  - elevation: 0 m (0 ft)
- Length: 18.1 km (11.2 mi)
- Basin size: 48 km^{2} (19 sq mi)

The Kurobe River (黒部川, Kurobegawa) is a tributary of the Tone River in Chiba Prefecture, Japan. It is 18.1 kilometers (11.2 mi) in length and has a drainage area of 48 square kilometers (19 sq mi).

== Geography ==
Under the Japan Rivers Act of 1906 the Yōrō is designated as a Class 1 River. The Kurobe originates in Katori and Asahi in Chiba Prefecture. The river flows through Katori before it empties into the Tone River at a sluice gate in the Tōwada District of Tōnoshō, Chiba. The Kurobegawa Reservoir was built to protect the river from salinity and flooding. The Kurobe provides drinking water and water for agricultural purposes along the length of the river. The JR East Narita Line runs parallel to the Kurobe River for several kilometers between Narita City and Chōshi.

== Tributaries of the Kurobe ==
- Kiyomizu River
- Kobori River
- Tama River
- Takenuma River

== Environmental conditions ==
=== Pollution conditions ===
The Kurobe River sits on relatively low-lying land, so the current of the river is slow, and water pollution is a problem. The cultivation of river plant species has been considered as a remedy to water pollution on the Kurobe. Grass carp are found along the length of the river, and cause extensive damage to existing reed species.

=== Fish species ===
Numerous species of fish are found in the Kurobe River, including:

- Common carp
- Silver carp
- Carassius carp
- Black bass
- Japanese eel

In 2010 a significant fish kill of large-bodied fish occurred in the Kurobe. The carcasses numbered approximately 3 tonnes (3.3 short tons). The kill was likely a result of a heat wave in the Tone River region that caused low level of oxygen in the river.

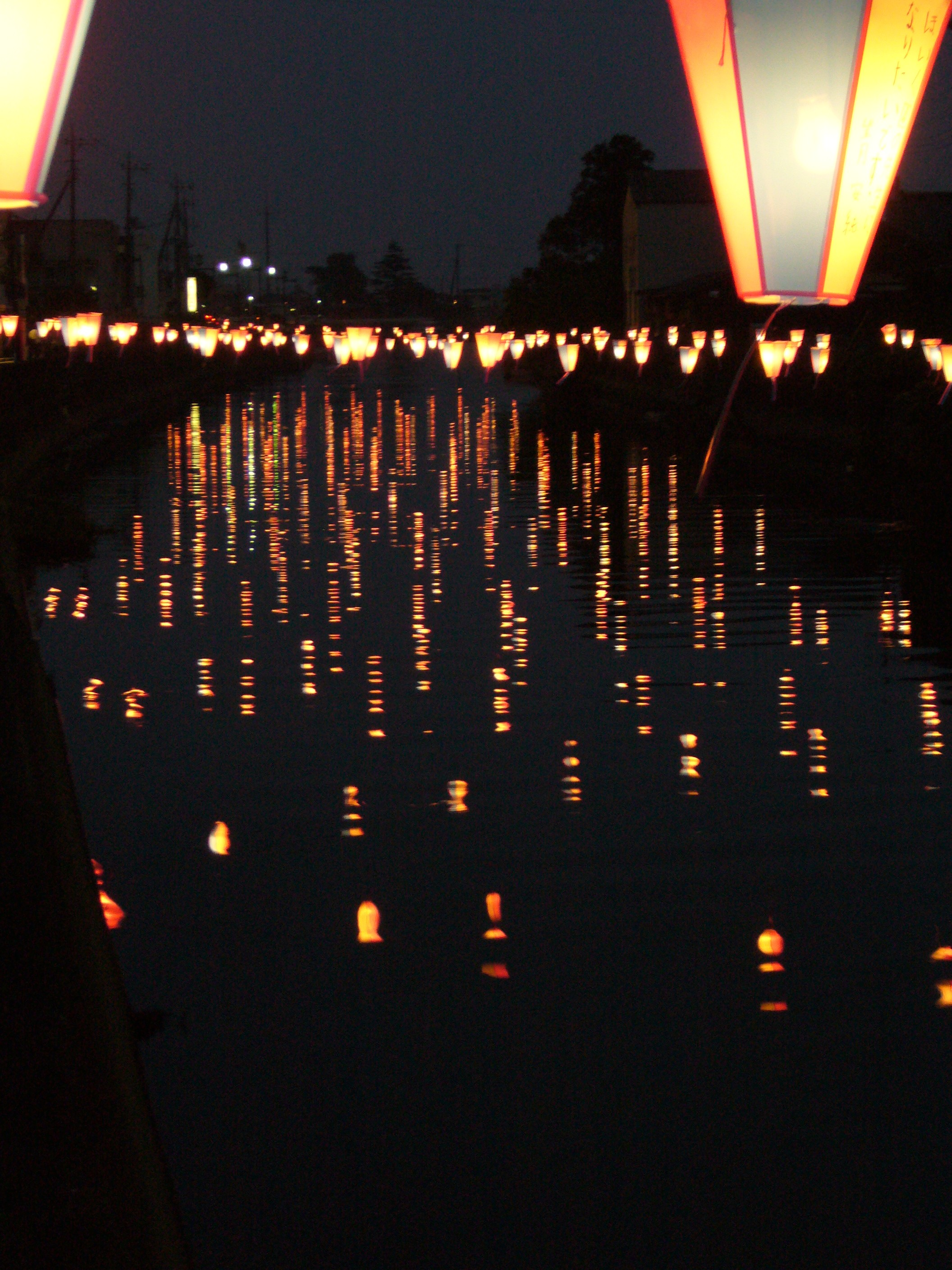
Illuminated lanterns on the Kurobe River

== History ==
=== Edo period ===
Kurobe was an active center of inland shipping. Tokugawa Ieyasu diverted the course of the Tone River to the east in 1654 to prevent flooding in Edo and exploit trade between agricultural areas along the Tone River, Chōshi and the Kujūkuri coast and the capitol Edo, now modern-day Tokyo. The Kurobe thus became a main trade route between the Tone and Edo in the Ed period. Numerous riverboats primarily transported rice through the region at this time. Merchants came to occupy both banks of the Kurobe, small piers were built along the length of the river to load goods from the surrounding villages of the Tone River region. Flatboats became the common mode of transport on the Kurobe.

=== Meiji period ===
At the beginning of the Meiji period the brewing industry grew in importance in the Tone River region. Merchants in the Kurobe River area prospered as alcoholic beverages and soy sauce were transported along the Kurobe, as were products from the sericulture industry. The scenery of Kurobe was compared in this period to that in Venice because of the extensive use of flatboats. Paddle steamers were introduced also to the river during the Meiji period as the technology became available in Japan.

=== 20th century ===
The advent of the railroad brought an end to inland shipping in the Tone River region. Merchants gradually transferred their businesses to areas in proximity to railroad stations. The Kurobe was especially affected by destruction as a result of a typhoon in 1941, and shipping along the river came to an abrupt end.

The Kurobe River became a popular recreation area as shipping along the river ended in the 20th century. It remains a popular area for canoeing, rowing, and regatta. The first water skiing competition was held in 1987, and the Katori City Regatta is held annually in July. Sport fishing is also popular on the Kurobe, and cuisine in local restaurants feature fish from the river. A black bass fishing tournament is held annually.

The effects of the tsunami caused by the 2011 Tōhoku earthquake and tsunami were measured at many points along the Tone River. At the mouth of the Kurobe River the tsunami caused water levels to rise 60 cm (24 in).
