= Tako, Chiba =

Tako 多古町
- Town
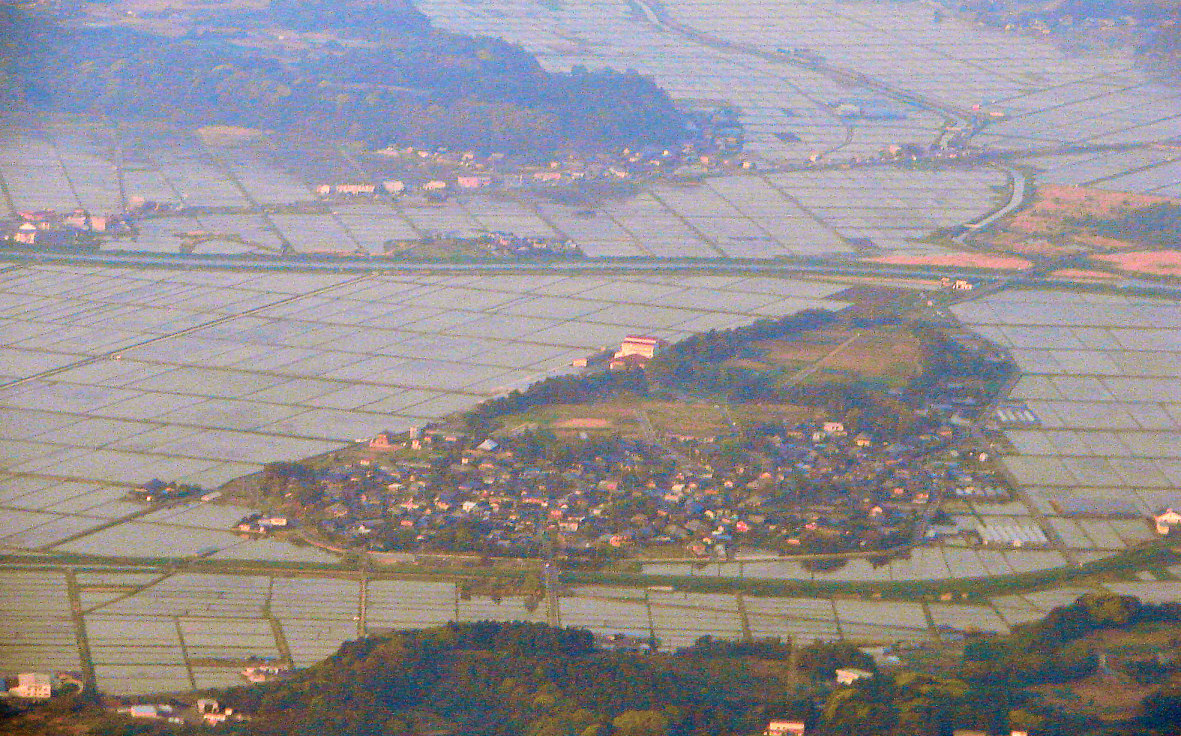
- Tako (Shima hamlet)

- Flag Seal

- Location of Tako in Chiba Prefecture

- Coordinates: 35°44′N 140°28′E
- Country: Japan
- Region: Kantō
- Prefecture: Chiba
- District: Katori

Area
  - Total: 72.68 km^{2} (28.06 sq mi)

Population (December 1, 2020)
  - Total: 14,387
  - Density: 197.9/km^{2} (512.7/sq mi)
- Time zone: UTC+9 (Japan Standard Time)
- City Symbols
- Tree: Camellia sasanqua
- Flower: Hydrangea
- Phone number: 0479-76-2611
- Address: 584 Tako, Tako-chō, Katori-gun, Chiba-ken 289-2292
- Website: Official website

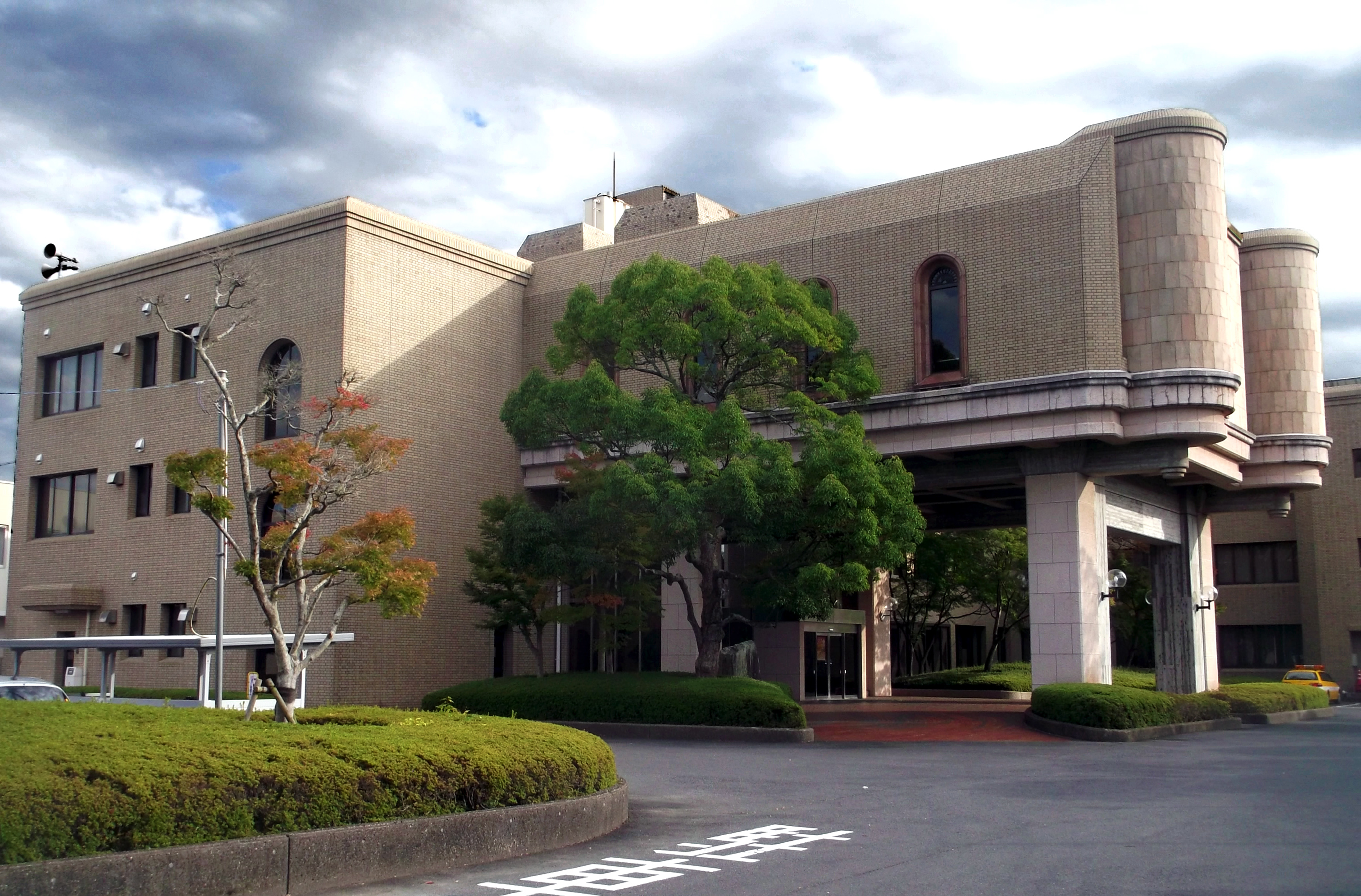
Tako Town Hall

Tako (多古町, Tako-machi) is a town located in Chiba Prefecture, Japan. As of 1 December 2020, the town had an estimated population of 14,387 in 6068 households and a population density of 200 persons per km^{2}. The total area of the town is 72.68 square kilometres (28.06 mi^{2}).

== Geography ==
Tako is located in the northeastern portion of Chiba prefecture, approximately 35 kilometers from the prefectural capital at Chiba and 60 to 70 kilometers from central Tokyo. The west borders Narita International Airport. Located on the Kanto Plain sandwiched between the Shimōsa Plateau and the Kujūkuri Plain, the majority of the land is flat. The Kuriyama River flows through the center of the town.

=== Neighboring municipalities ===
Chiba Prefecture

- Katori
- Narita
- Shibayama
- Sōsa
- Yokoshibahikari

=== Climate ===
Tako has a humid subtropical climate (Köppen Cfa) characterized by warm summers and cool winters with light to no snowfall. The average annual temperature in Tako is 14.6 °C. The average annual rainfall is 1500 mm with September as the wettest month. The temperatures are highest on average in August, at around 25.8 °C, and lowest in January, at around 4.5 °C.

== Demographics ==
Per Japanese census data, the population of Tako has been decreasing slowly over the past 70 years.

Historical population
Year	Pop.	±%
1920	16,260	—
1930	17,599	+8.2%
1940	18,660	+6.0%
1950	21,969	+17.7%
1960	20,042	−8.8%
1970	17,367	−13.3%
1980	17,133	−1.3%
1990	17,683	+3.2%
2000	17,603	−0.5%
2010	16,002	−9.1%
2020	13,735	−14.2%

== History ==
Tako has been inhabited since prehistoric times, and archaeologists have found dugout canoes and graves from the Jōmon period, and rice paddies from the Yayoi period. The area also has numerous tumuli from the Kofun period, from which haniwa pottery has been recovered. During the Heian period, it was divided into shōen controlled by the Fujiwara clan and came under the control of the Chiba clan in the Kamakura period. During the Edo period, it was tenryō territory within Shimōsa province ruled directly by the Tokugawa shogunate via hatamoto administrators.

After the Meiji Restoration, Tako village was established on April 1, 1889, within Katori District of Chiba Prefecture with the creation of the modern municipalities ordinance. Tako was elevated to town status on June 29, 1890. On April 1, 1951, Tako annexed neighboring Tōjō Village. It expanded further on March 31, 1954, by annexing neighboring Naka, Kuga, and Tokiwa villages.

== Government ==
Tako has a mayor-council form of government with a directly elected mayor and a unicameral town council of 14 members. Tako, together with the city of Katori and town of Kōzaki, contributes two members to the Chiba Prefectural Assembly. In terms of national politics, the town is part of Chiba 10th district of the lower house of the Diet of Japan.

== Economy ==
Tako is a regional commercial center and agricultural center. In addition to rice, an important economic factor is animal husbandry, most significantly intensive pig farming. Approximately 20% of the workforce commutes to Narita, per the 2010 census.

== Education ==
Tako has three public elementary schools and one public middle school operated by the city government. The town has one public high school operated by the Chiba Prefectural Board of Education and one private high school.

== Transportation ==
=== Railway ===
Tako was formerly served by the now-defunct Narita Railway Tako Line from 1911 to 1944. It does not currently have any railway service. The nearest train station is Shibayama-Chiyoda on the Shibayama Railway; however, connections are more frequent from Narita Station.

=== Highway ===
- National Route 296

== Sister cities ==
- San Roque, Cádiz, Spain
- Gilroy, California, United States

== Noted people from Tako ==
- Iizasa Ienao, Muromachi period swordsman
- Youichi Ui, professional motorcycle racer
