= Shibayama Kofun Cluster =

Group of Kofun period burial mounds in Japan

Shibayama Kofun cluster
- 芝山古墳群 (Japanese)
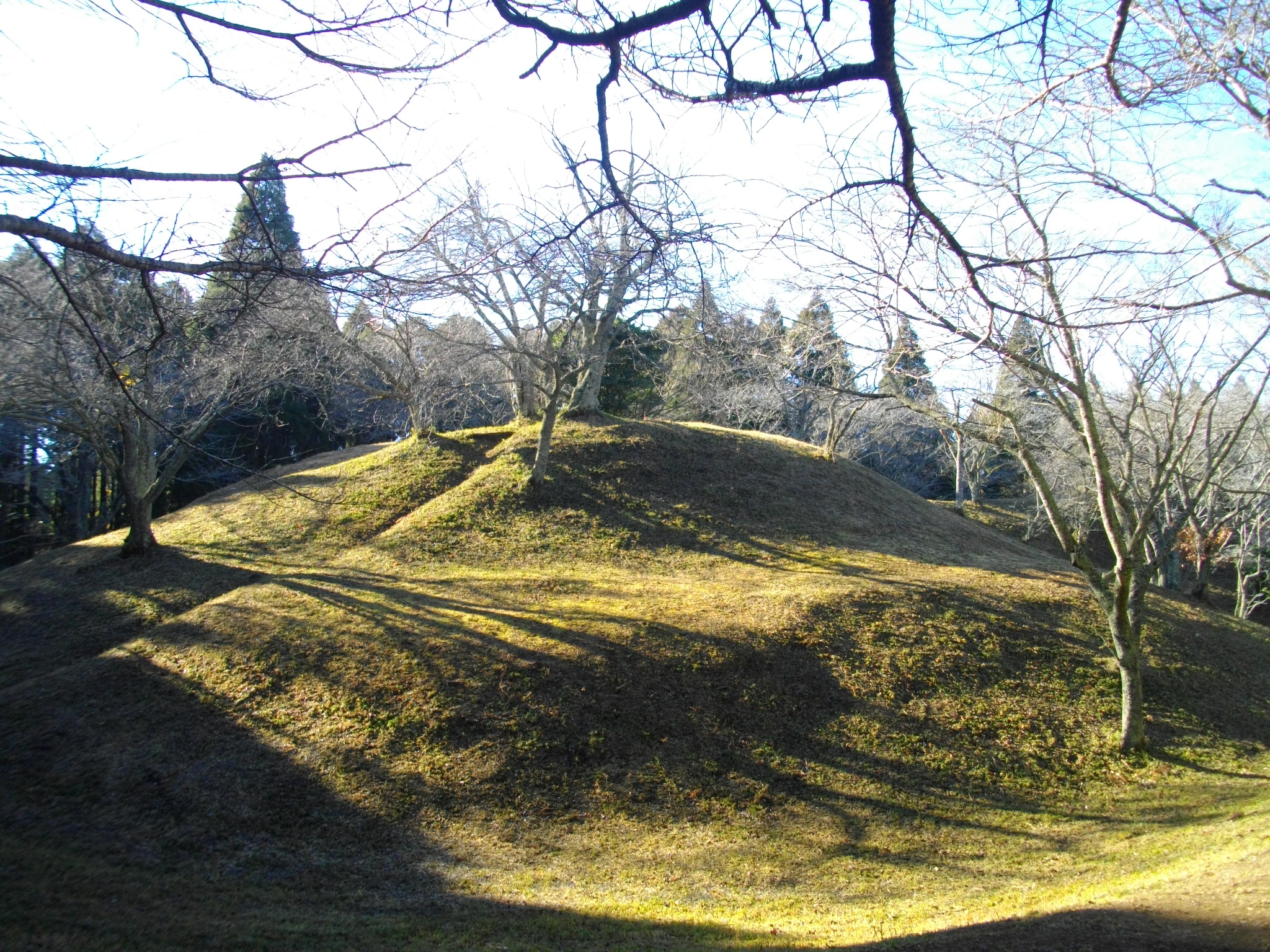
- Tonozuka Kofun in the Shibayama kofun cluster

- Shibayama kofun cluster Shibayama Kofun Cluster (Japan)
- 35°40′51″N 140°25′04″E
- Type: kofun
- Periods: Kofun period
- Location: Yokoshibahikari, Chiba, Japan
- Region: Kantō region

Site notes
- Public access: Yes (Museum)

The Shibayama Kofun cluster (芝山古墳群) is a group of Kofun period burial mounds located in what is now the Nakadai neighborhood of the town of Yokoshibahikari, Chiba Prefecture in the Kantō region of Japan. The site was designated a National Historic Site of Japan in 1958. Despite its name, it is not located in the town of Shibayama, but in neighboring Yokoshibahikari, and it is also called the Nakadai kofun cluster (中台古墳群).

== Overview ==
The Shibayama site is located on the plateau on the east bank of the Kido River, which flows through the central Kujukuri Plain in north-central Bōsō Peninsula. The cluster consists of two keyhole-shaped kofun and 13 dome-shaped kofun. The site was excavated in 1956 by Waseda University, and is noteworthy for a unique group of haniwa depicting a complete a funeral procession. Many of they artifacts discovered are stored and displayed at the Shibayama Haniwa Museum (芝山はにわ博物館, Shibayama Haniwa Hakubutsukan), located in the grounds of the temple of Kannonkyō-ji, in the town of Shibayama.

=== Tonozuka ===
The Tonozuka (殿塚) is the larger of the two tumuli, and is a zenpō-kōen-fun (前方後円墳), which is shaped like a keyhole, having one square end and one circular end, when viewed from above. It has a total length of 88 meters and was constructed in two tiers. The opening of the tumulus is orientated to the west and the tumulus was surrounded by a double rectangular moat. It was covered in haniwa, many of which had been preserved by having fallen into the soft mud of the moat. In addition to many cylindrical haniwa, the north side of the moat contained haniwa shaped as horses, dogs, cows, female deer, wild boar, birds (ducks and other waterfowl). Haniwa depicting men and women were found from the area of the posterior circular portion, and morning-glory shaped haniwa and two anthropomorphic haniwa were found on the north side. The horizontal stone burial chamber was painted red on the interior. Grave goods included beads such as magatama, gold rings, iron swords, gold bells, and bronze ornamental horse fittings.

Total length
88 meters
Anterior rectangular portion
58 meters wide x 10 meters high, 2-tier
Posterior circular portion
58 meter diameter x 10.4 meters high, 2-tiers

=== Himezuka ===
The Himezuka (姫塚) is the smaller of the two keyhole-shaped tumuli, and has a total length of 58.8 meters. It was constructed in parallel to, and 30 meters to the north, of the Tonozuka. An excavation in the year 2000 found that it also had a double moat. The horizontal stone-lined burial chamber has a total length of 5.72 meters. As with the Tonozuka, grave goods included magatama, gold rings, bronze ornaments, a large-sized iron sword, iron dagger, gold-copper decorative horse fittings, etc. The haniwa at the Himezuka were found to be in situ and were in excellent preservation. Of especial interest was a depiction of people and horses in a funeral procession extending for 50 meters in a line from the front of the tumulus to the back of the posterior circular portion, which contained the opening to the burial chamber. This procession included a group of men on horses wearing hats, and four horses with sandals, five warriors, followed by a group of 16 men with a wheel-shaped haniwa, a group of seven women, followed by ten more men. Among these figures were a warrior with a beard, a farmer with a hoe, and a man kneeling with a musical instrument. These haniwa were all dated to the latter half of the 6th century AD and represent the peak of haniwa expression.

Total length
58.8 meters
Anterior rectangular portion
35 meters wide x 4.5 meters high
Posterior circular portion
35 meter diameter x 5 meters high

=== Other tumuli ===
The other tumuli in the cluster are all circular-type (empun (円墳)), with diameters of around 20 meters. They are well preserved and remain unexcavated.

The site is located a five-minute walk from the Yokoshiba Nakadai bus stop on the airport shuttle bus from Keisei Narita Station.

== See also ==
- List of Historic Sites of Japan (Chiba)
