= Kanpuku-ji (Yamakura, Katori) =

Buddhist temple in Chiba Prefecture, Japan

- 観福寺
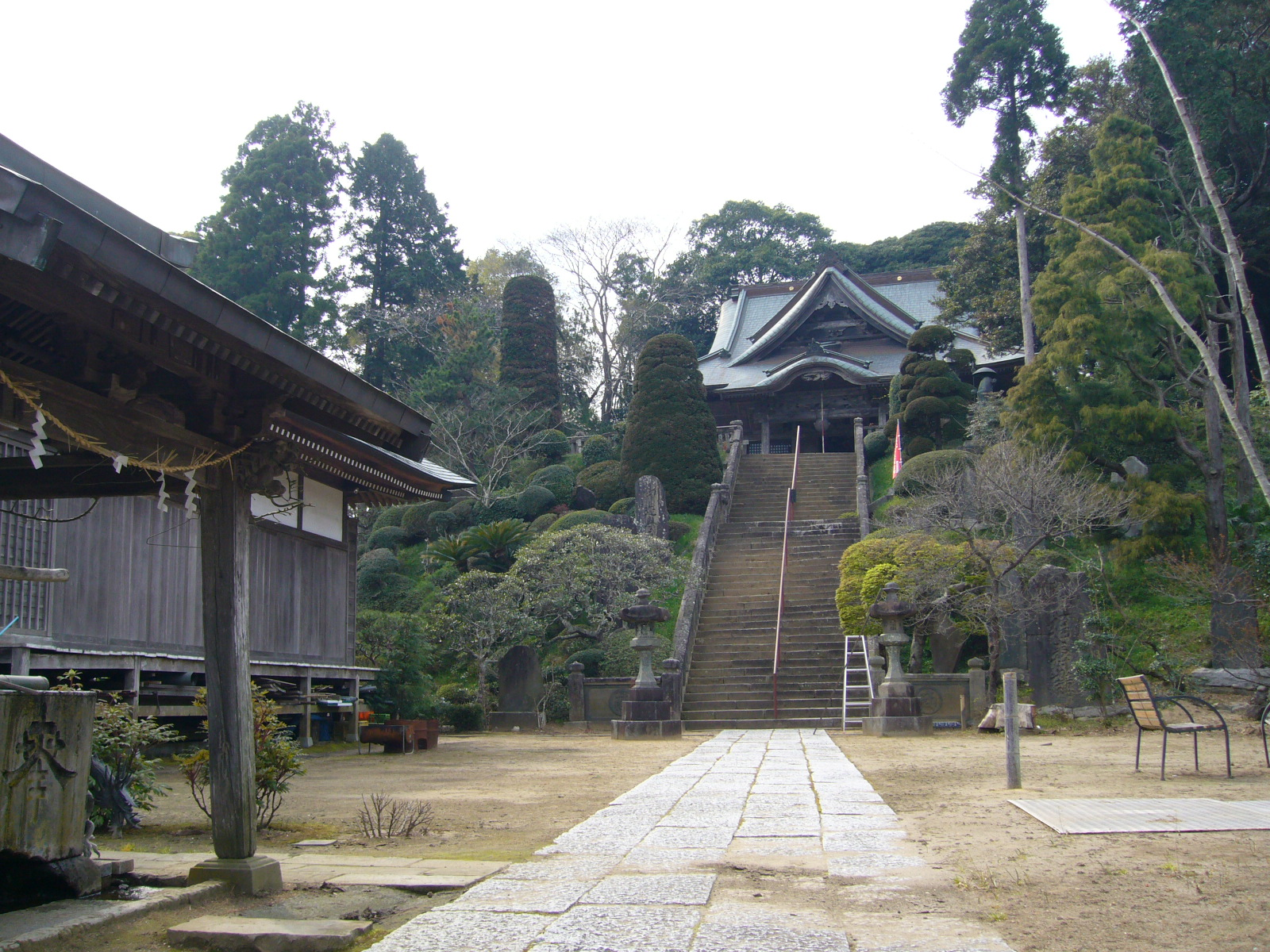
- Kanpuku-ji

- Kanpuku-ji Kanpuku-ji (Yamakura, Katori) (Japan)

Religion
- Affiliation: Buddhist
- Deity: Dairoku Ten (大六天)
- Rite: Shingon Buzan Sect
- Status: active

Location
- Location: 1934-1 Yamakura, Katori-shi, Chiba-ken
- Country: Japan
- Coordinates: 35°47′17.98″N 140°32′2.26″E

Architecture
- Founder: Enton
- Completed: 811 AD

Website
- web.archive.org/web/20140116091755/http://kanto88.net/kanto88_45.html (in Japanese)

Kanpuku-ji (観福寺) is a Buddhist temple of the Shingon Buzan Sect located in Yamakura, Katori, Chiba Prefecture. The temple is one of two temples in Katori with the same name, the other being Makinosan Kanpuku-ji.

== History ==
Kanpuku-ji was, by legend, founded by a priest named Enton in 811. The famed Kūkai (774–835), the founder of Shingon Buddhism, visited the region in 814AD and found that residents of the area were suffering from infectious diseases. Kūkai fasted and prayed to Takejizai-ten (他化自在天) and the Kosodate Kannon (子育観音). The residents offered Kūkai salmon from the nearby Kuri River and were suddenly cured. The festival of the temple, held on 7 October annually, includes the offering of a raw salmon during a Buddhist service. The temple obtained the right to use the imperial Chrysanthemum crest from Emperor Saga (786–842), and for its priests to wear purple robes as a mark of its status.

Through most of its history, under the Shinbutsu-shūgō philosophy, Kanpuku-ji served as an auxiliary temple to the nearby Yamakura Shrine. After the Meiji Restoration. In 1871, under the shinbutsu bunri movement, temples and shrines were formally separated. Buddhist objects were removed from the Yamakura Shrine and installed in Kanpuku-ji, a process that lasted into the early 20th century.

== Structures ==
- Mizuya, a roofed area with a water basin for hand washing
- Kyakuden, reception hall
- Kuri, monks' quarters
- Kōdō, lecture hall
- Nyōkyōsho, a place of offering of a Buddhist sutra

== Order in Buddhist pilgrimage ==
Kanpuku-ji is the 45th temple in the Kantō Hachijūhachikasho, a pilgrimage circuit of 88 Buddhist temples in the Kantō region of eastern Japan visited by, or associated with Kūkai.

Preceded by Kōzaki-ji (神崎寺) #44	Kantō Hachijūhachikasho; Kanpuku-ji #45	Succeeded by Mangan-ji (満願寺) (special)

== Transportation ==
Kanpuku-ji is located approximately 6 kilometres (3.7 mi) east of Narita International Airport, but is not easily accessible by public transportation. It can be reached by bus from Sawara Station or Omigawa Station on the JR East Narita Line.
