= Katori, Chiba =

Katori 香取市
- City
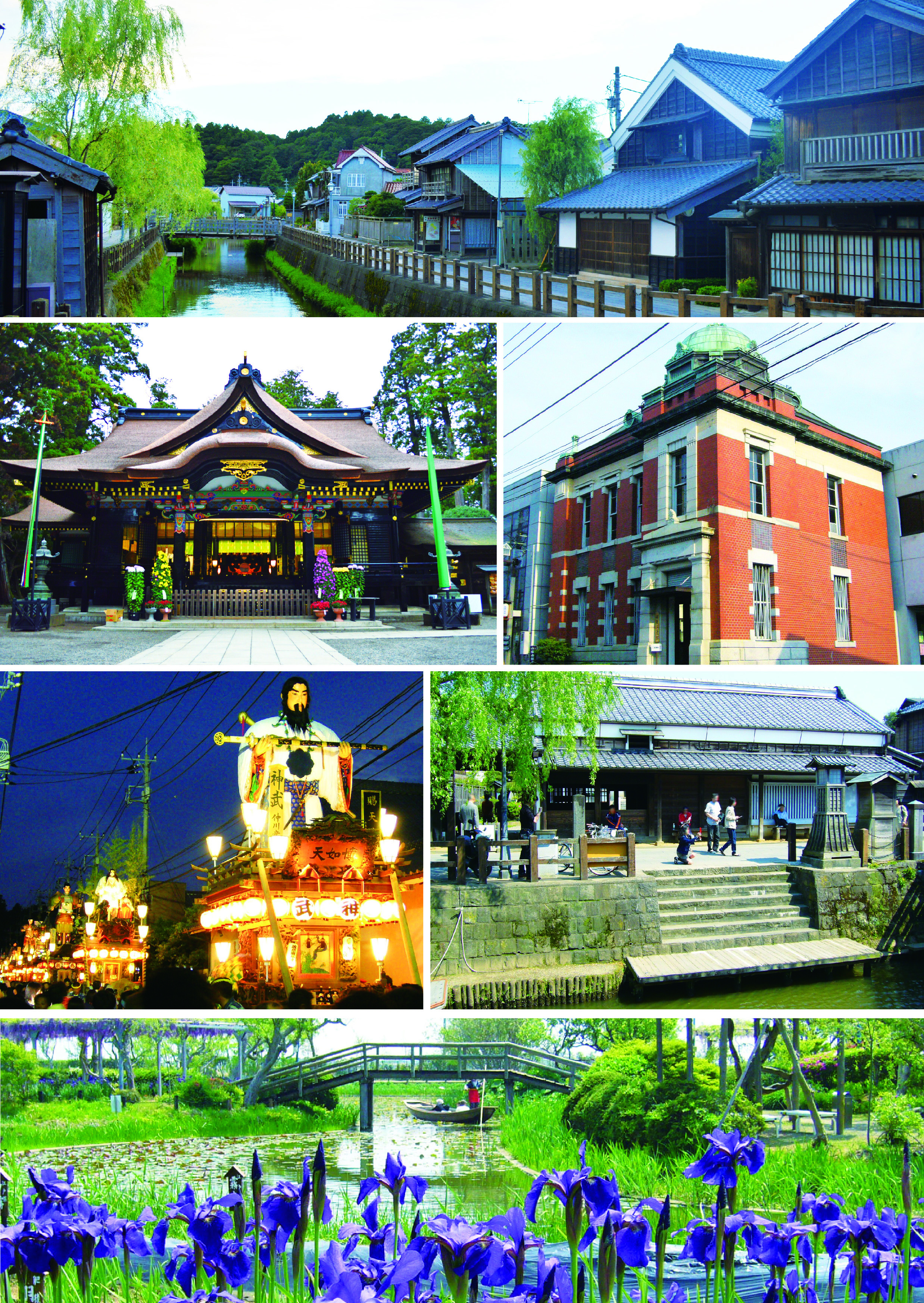
Sawara old town
Katori Jingu	Sawara Mitsubishi-kan
Sawara O-Matsuri	Ino Tadataka house
Suigō Sawara Iris Park
- Flag Seal

- Location of Katori in Chiba Prefecture

- Coordinates: 35°53′52.123″N 140°29′58.678″E
- Country: Japan
- Region: Kantō
- Prefecture: Chiba

Government
  - Mayor: Tomonori Itō (since April 2022)

Area
  - Total: 262.31 km^{2} (101.28 sq mi)

Population (November 1, 2020)
  - Total: 74,469
  - Density: 283.90/km^{2} (735.29/sq mi)
- Time zone: UTC+9 (Japan Standard Time)
- Phone number: 0478-54-1111
- Address: Sawaraguchi 2127, Katori-shi, Chiba-ken; 287-8501
- Climate: Cfa
- Website: Official website
- Symbols
- Bird: Great reed warbler
- Flower: Japanese iris (Iris laevigata)
- Tree: Sakura

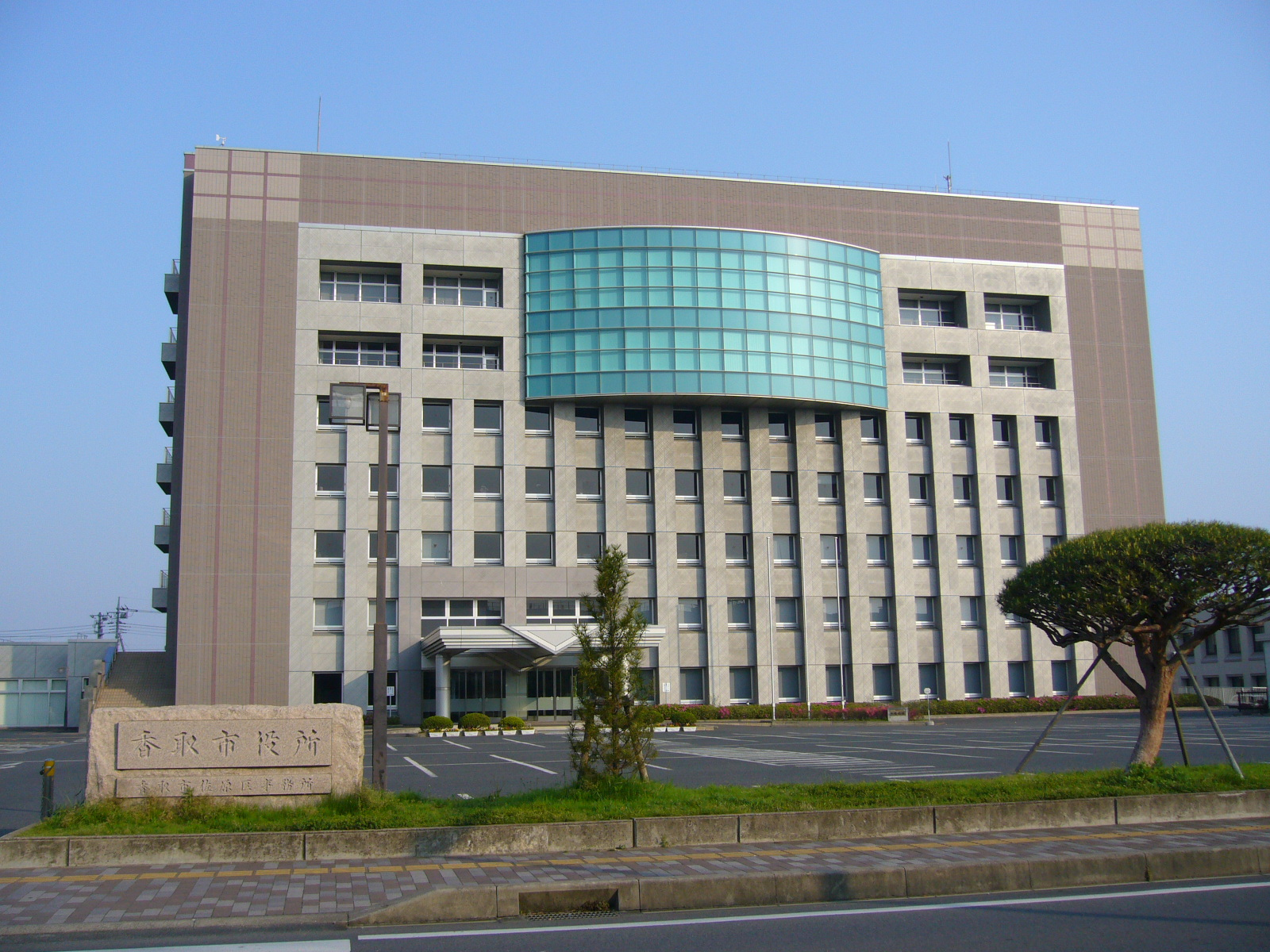
Katori City Hall

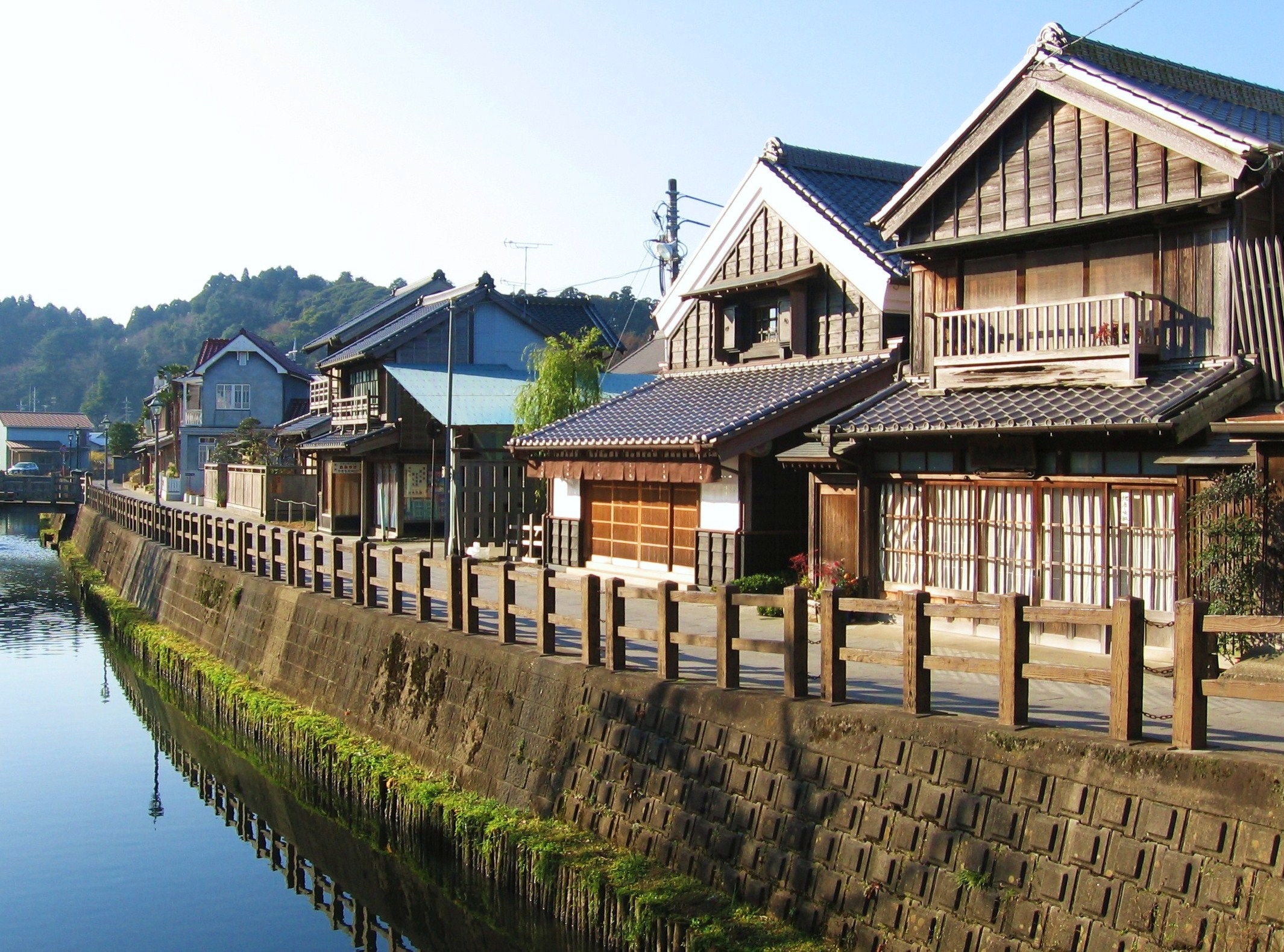
A view of old Sawara

Katori (香取市, Katori-shi) is a city located in Chiba Prefecture, Japan. As of 1 November 2020, the city had an estimated population of 74,469 in 31,113 households and a population density of 280 persons per km^{2}. The total area of the city is 262.31 square kilometres (101.28 sq mi). Katori Shrine is in the city of Katori, as is the old merchant town and canal of Sawara.

== Geography ==
Katori is located in far northeastern Chiba Prefecture, along the lower reaches of the Tone River. It is about 45 kilometers from the prefectural capital at Chiba and 70 to 80 kilometers from central Tokyo. It is included in the Narita metropolitan area (Narita city) in the urban employment area, and the commuting rate to Narita city is 12.7% (2010 census). It borders Ibaraki prefecture on the opposite bank across the Tone River. The city is in the Kanto Plain, and although there are places along the Tone River that exceed 50 meters, the average elevation of the city is approximately 20 to 40 meters. Parts of the city are located within the borders of the Suigō-Tsukuba Quasi-National Park.

=== Surrounding municipalities ===
Chiba Prefecture

- Asahi
- Kōzaki
- Narita
- Sōsa
- Tako
- Tōnoshō

Ibaraki Prefecture

- Inashiki
- Itako
- Kamisu

=== Climate ===
Katori has a humid subtropical climate (Köppen Cfa) characterized by warm summers and cool winters with light to no snowfall. The average annual temperature in Katori is 14.4 °C (57.9 °F). The average annual rainfall is 1,593.6 mm (62.74 in) with October as the wettest month. The temperatures are highest on average in August, at around 25.4 °C (77.7 °F), and lowest in January, at around 3.5 °C (38.3 °F).

Climate data for Katori (1999−2020 normals, extremes 1999−present)
Month	Jan	Feb	Mar	Apr	May	Jun	Jul	Aug	Sep	Oct	Nov	Dec	Year
Record high °C (°F)	18.6 (65.5)	24.5 (76.1)	24.2 (75.6)	29.4 (84.9)	32.6 (90.7)	33.5 (92.3)	36.9 (98.4)	36.5 (97.7)	35.5 (95.9)	31.6 (88.9)	25.5 (77.9)	24.1 (75.4)	36.9 (98.4)
Mean daily maximum °C (°F)	9.0 (48.2)	9.7 (49.5)	13.2 (55.8)	17.8 (64.0)	22.1 (71.8)	24.7 (76.5)	28.7 (83.7)	29.9 (85.8)	26.2 (79.2)	21.1 (70.0)	16.3 (61.3)	11.4 (52.5)	19.2 (66.5)
Daily mean °C (°F)	3.5 (38.3)	4.5 (40.1)	7.9 (46.2)	12.6 (54.7)	17.2 (63.0)	20.5 (68.9)	24.3 (75.7)	25.4 (77.7)	22.2 (72.0)	16.9 (62.4)	11.3 (52.3)	5.8 (42.4)	14.3 (57.8)
Mean daily minimum °C (°F)	−2.0 (28.4)	−0.8 (30.6)	2.2 (36.0)	7.2 (45.0)	12.7 (54.9)	16.9 (62.4)	20.9 (69.6)	22.0 (71.6)	18.8 (65.8)	12.8 (55.0)	6.2 (43.2)	0.4 (32.7)	9.8 (49.6)
Record low °C (°F)	−8.7 (16.3)	−8.9 (16.0)	−5.8 (21.6)	−3.3 (26.1)	0.9 (33.6)	7.5 (45.5)	13.4 (56.1)	13.9 (57.0)	7.9 (46.2)	2.1 (35.8)	−2.5 (27.5)	−7.8 (18.0)	−8.9 (16.0)
Average precipitation mm (inches)	84.3 (3.32)	69.0 (2.72)	114.1 (4.49)	124.4 (4.90)	134.5 (5.30)	146.3 (5.76)	130.9 (5.15)	116.0 (4.57)	206.5 (8.13)	282.7 (11.13)	110.5 (4.35)	71.8 (2.83)	1,593.6 (62.74)
Average precipitation days (≥ 1.0 mm)	5.6	7.0	10.6	10.3	10.7	10.9	9.8	7.7	11.6	12.0	8.8	6.2	111.2
Mean monthly sunshine hours	194.7	167.0	183.2	181.3	181.8	132.6	157.6	189.4	141.1	131.2	149.3	171.4	1,980.2
Source: Japan Meteorological Agency

== Demographics ==
Per Japanese census data, the population of Katori has declined over the past 30 years.

Historical population
Year	Pop.	±%
1920	67,449	—
1930	73,218	+8.6%
1940	77,261	+5.5%
1950	97,221	+25.8%
1960	92,275	−5.1%
1970	84,519	−8.4%
1980	92,048	+8.9%
1990	93,275	+1.3%
2000	90,943	−2.5%
2010	82,866	−8.9%
2020	72,356	−12.7%

== History ==
After the Meiji Restoration, the area consisted of the towns of Sawara and Omigawa, and the villages of Katori, Kanishi and Higashi-Daito (founded within Katori District on May 23, 1890). Katori was raised to town status on May 5, 1897. On March 15, 1951, the city of Sawara was formed by the merger of Katori, Sawara, Omigawa and Higashi-Daito. Sawara expanded on February 11, 1955, by annexing the neighboring villages of Niijima, Okura, Mizuho and Tsunomiya.

On March 27, 2006, the modern city of Katori was created when Sawara was merged with the towns of Kurimoto, Omigawa and Yamada (all from Katori District).

== Government ==
Katori has a mayor-council form of government with a directly elected mayor and a unicameral city council of 22 members. Katori, together with the neighboring towns of Kōzaki and Tako, contributes two members to the Chiba Prefectural Assembly. In terms of national politics, the city is part of Chiba 10th district of the lower house of the Diet of Japan.

== Economy ==
Katori is a regional commercial center. The economy is primarily agricultural, with rice, chives, onions, and greater burdock as major crops.

== Education ==
Katori has 16 public elementary schools and seven public middle schools operated by the city government, and three public high schools operated by the Chiba Prefectural Board of Education. There is also one private high school.

== Transportation ==
=== Railways ===
JR East – Narita Line

- Ōto - Sawara - Katori - Suigō - Omigawa

JR East – Kashima Line

- (Sawara -) Katori - Jūnikyō

=== Highways ===
- Higashi-Kantō Expressway
- National Route 51
- National Route 356

== Local attractions ==
- Kanpuku-ji
- Katori Jingu
- Kurobe River
- Suigō Sawara Aquatic Botanical Garden
- Yamakurayama Kanpuku-ji

== Noted people from Katori ==
- Nobuyuki Kase, actor
- Kazuo Misaki, mixed martial artist
- Takao Sakurai, professional boxer
- Yamamura Shinjiro, Minister of Transport, involved in Japan Airlines Flight 351 hijacking
