= Shibayama, Chiba =

Shibayama 芝山町
- Town
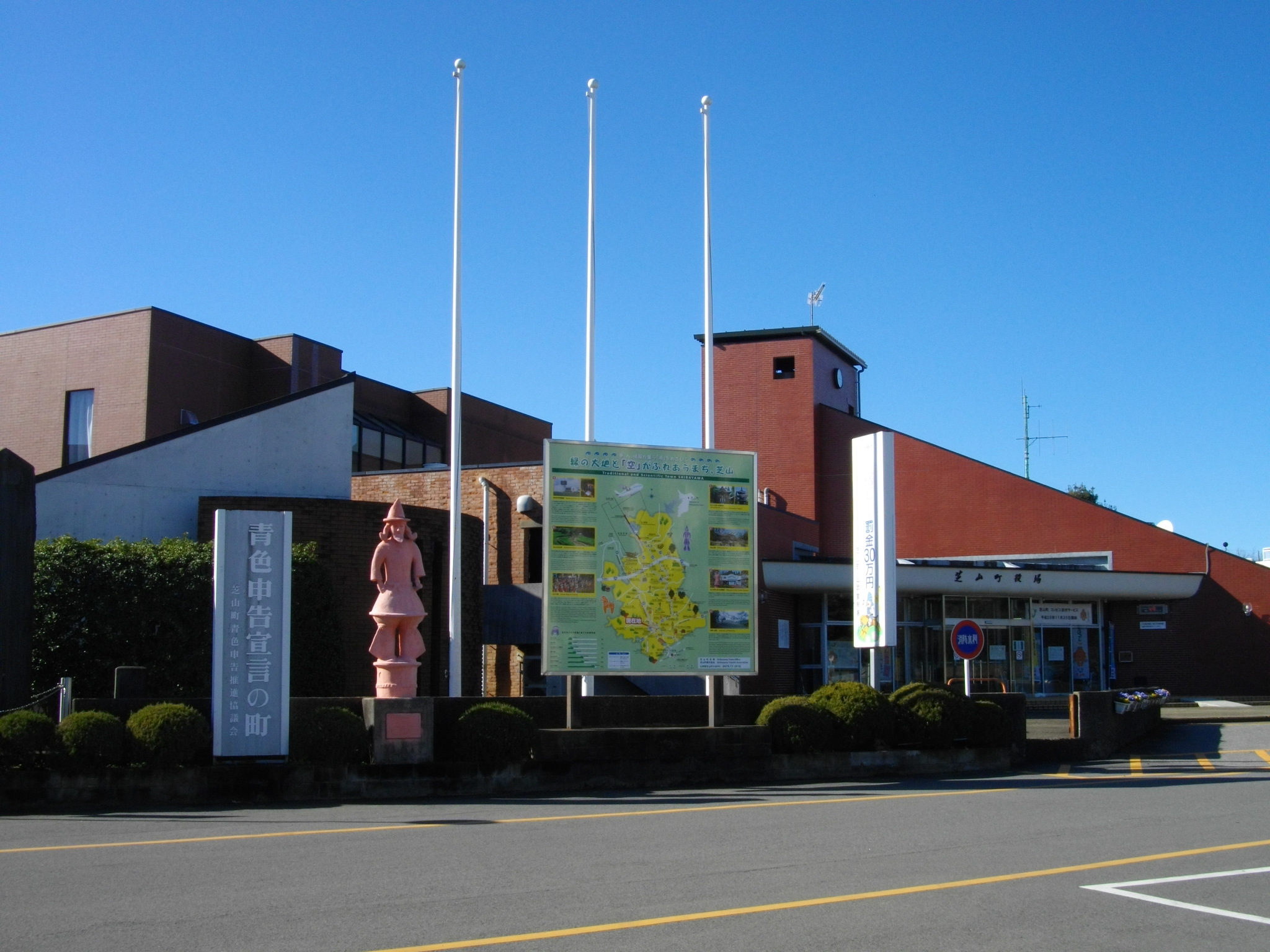
- Shibayama Town Office

- Flag Seal

- Location of Shibayama in Chiba Prefecture

- Location of Shibayama in Japan
- Coordinates: 35°42′N 140°25′E
- Country: Japan
- Region: Kantō
- Prefecture: Chiba
- District: Sanbu

Area
  - Total: 43.47 km^{2} (16.78 sq mi)

Population (December 1, 2020)
  - Total: 7,122
  - Density: 163.8/km^{2} (424.3/sq mi)
- Time zone: UTC+9 (Japan Standard Time)
- City Symbols
- Tree: Yamazakura (Prunus jamasakura)
- Phone number: 0479-77-3901
- Website: Official website

Shibayama (芝山町, Shibayama-machi) is a town located in Chiba Prefecture, Japan. As of 1 December 2020, the town had an estimated population of 7,122 in 3030 households and a population density of 160 persons per km^{2}. The total area of the town is 43.47 square kilometres (16.78 mi^{2}).

== Geography ==
Shibayama is located in northeastern Chiba Prefecture, about 30 kilometers from the prefectural capital at Chiba and 50 to 60 kilometers from the center of Tokyo. The town is a hilly area, located almost in the center of the Shimōsa Plateau. Narita International Airport is located to the north of the town on the border between Shibayama and Narita. Most airport service facilities are located on the Narita side: however, Shibayama has developed a local industrial base due to the airport's presence, and hosts three major industrial areas. The remainder of the town is agricultural, and much of it is covered with rice paddies and areas of vegetable production. As it lies directly beneath one of the main approach paths to the airport, noise pollution and eminent domain issues have caused it to be a center of anti-airport activism.

=== Surrounding municipalities ===
Chiba Prefecture

- Narita
- Sanmu
- Tako
- Tomisato
- Yokoshibahikari

=== Climate ===
Shibayama has a humid subtropical climate (Köppen Cfa) characterized by warm summers and cool winters with light to no snowfall. The average annual temperature in Shibayama is 14.7 °C. The average annual rainfall is 1517 mm with September as the wettest month. The temperatures are highest on average in August, at around 25.9 °C, and lowest in January, at around 4.7 °C.

== Demographics ==
Per Japanese census data, the population of Shibayama peaked around the 1950 and has declined by roughly one-third in the decades since.

Historical population
Year	Pop.	±%
1920	8,506	—
1930	8,840	+3.9%
1940	9,150	+3.5%
1950	11,002	+20.2%
1960	9,969	−9.4%
1970	8,198	−17.8%
1980	7,971	−2.8%
1990	8,347	+4.7%
2000	8,401	+0.6%
2010	7,920	−5.7%
2020	7,033	−11.2%

== History ==
Shibayama Town was established on July 1, 1955, by the merger of the villages of Chiyoda and Nikawa.

== Government ==
Shibayama has a mayor-council form of government with a directly elected mayor and a unicameral town council of 12 members. Shibayama, together with neighboring Sanmu and the other municipalities of Sanmu District collectively contributes two members to the Chiba Prefectural Assembly. In terms of national politics, the town is part of Chiba 11th district of the lower house of the Diet of Japan.

== Economy ==
In 2007 Nippon Cargo Airlines signed an order with Taisei Corporation for the construction of a crew training center. Construction on the crew center, located in Shibayama, was to begin in September 2007. The company scheduled for the facility to become operational in September 2008.

== Education ==
Shibayama has one public elementary school and one public middle school operated by the town government. The town does not have a high school.

== Transportation ==
=== Railway ===
- Shibayama Railway Company – Shibayama Railway
  - Shibayama-Chiyoda

=== Highway ===
- National Route 296, which connects Sōsa, Chiba and Funabashi, Chiba

== Local attractions ==
=== Haniwa of Shibayama ===
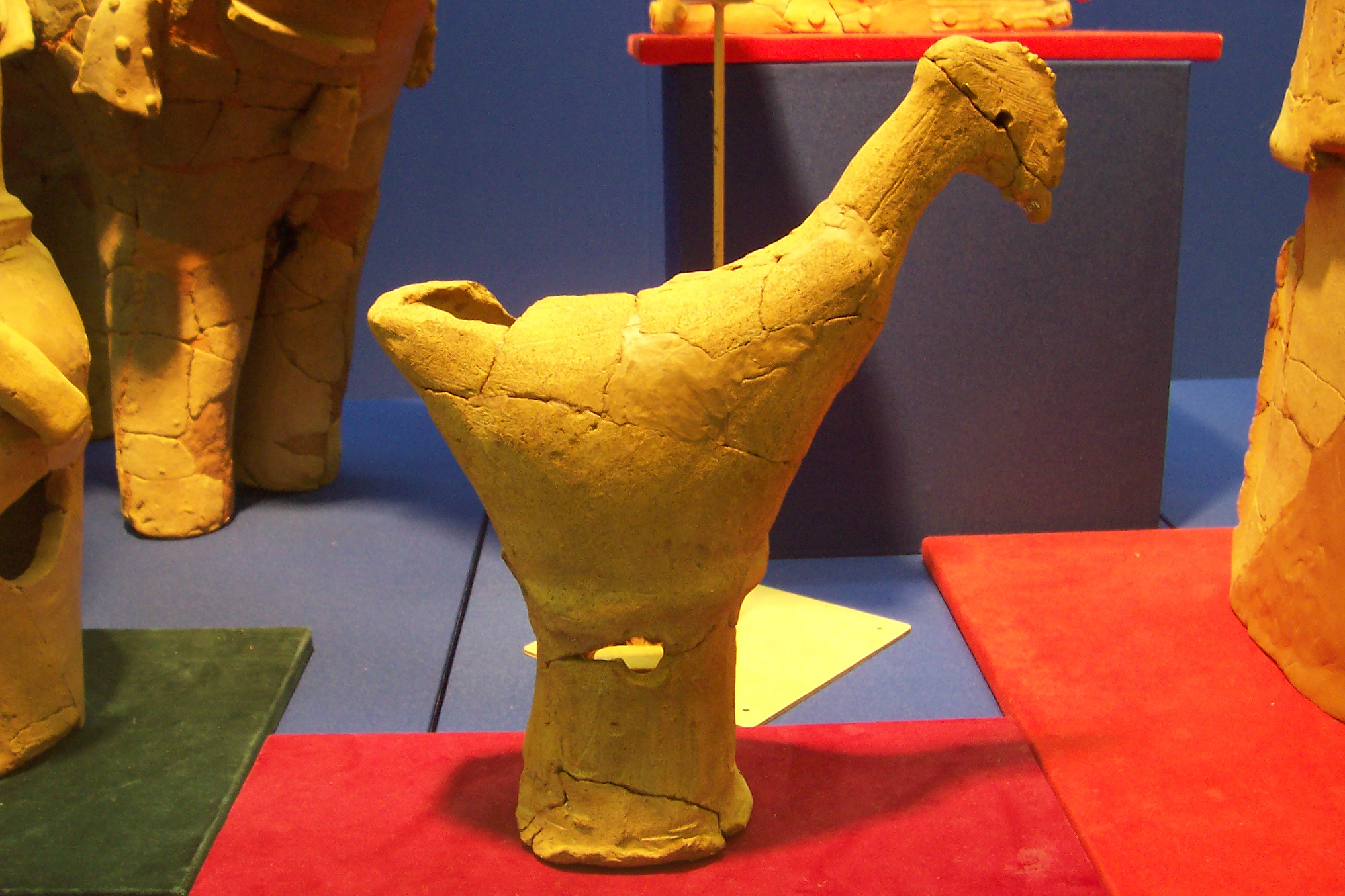
Haniwa of a chicken, Shibayama Kofun Haniwa Museum

Haniwa, terracotta funerary objects of the Kofun period (250 – 538 AD) are designated a cultural symbol for Shibayama. The main north–south road in Shibayama, Prefectural Route 62, is designated "Haniwa Avenue" in the town, and is lined with large-scale reproductions of haniwa statues. The Haniwa come from the many burial mounds located in Shibayama, primarily from the Shibayama Kofun Cluster. Shibayama is home to the Shibayama Kofun Haniwa Museum, located in close proximity to the Shibayama Kofun Cluster.

The Shibayama Haniwa Festival is held annually on the second Sunday of November. Created in 1982, the festival is a day-long which centers on a procession of adults dressed as local Kofun-period rulers, and elementary and middle school children dressed as kodaijin (古代人), a term that means "ancient people". The festival ends after dark with a bonfire at the Shibayama Kumano Shrine that symbolizes the funeral service of a local Kofun-period ruler.

=== Shibayama Niōson Temple ===
Kannonkyō-ji, a Buddhist temple of the Tendai sect, is popularly known in the town as the Shibayama Niōson Temple. It dates, by tradition, to 781 and contains a 3-tiered pagoda. The pagoda is designated a Chiba Prefectural Important Cultural Property. The temple also features a museum with displays of haniwa as well as Buddhist art and artifacts.

== Notable people ==
- Shirō Ishii, Imperial Japanese Army biological warfare specialist and war criminal
- Teiichi Suzuki, Imperial Japanese Army general and politician
