= North Kanto serial kidnappings and murders =

Series of child kidnappings and murders in Japan

North Kanto Serial Young Girl Kidnapping and Murder Case

Details
- Victims: 5
- Span of crimes: 1979–1996
- Country: Japan
- States: Tochigi, Gunma

The North Kanto Young Girl Serial Kidnapping and Murder Case (北関東連続幼女誘拐殺人事件, Kita-Kantou Renzoku Youjo Yuukai Satsujin Jiken) is a serial kidnapping and murder case that has been going on since 1979 in Japan's Tochigi and Gunma prefectures. The Ashikaga murder case is included in this.

== Background ==
Since 1979, there have been five cases of kidnapping and murder of young girls between ages four and eight (four kidnappings and murders, one kidnapping where the kidnapped girl was never found) occurring within a 20 km (12 mi) radius, near the border between Tochigi and Gunma prefectures. All of these cases took place in Ota City of Gunma prefecture or Ashikaga city of Tochigi prefecture.

== Discovery of the case ==
In 2007, investigative journalist Kiyoshi Shimizu began investigations into the similarities between the five cases, and came across how the Ashikaga murder case had already been solved, with the supposed culprit Toshikazu Sugaya having admitted (but not been charged with) two other murders. Shimizu's reporting on the subject led to the discovery that Sugaya was innocent, and the National Police Agency and Prosecutor's Office later acknowledged their wrongdoing and the nature of the five cases as a single serial case, and this was further affirmed by minister Kansei Nakano in a Diet session.

The statute of limitations is commonly brought up as all but the last of the five cases has had it pass. This was addressed in a diet meeting in 2011 in which then-prime minister Naoto Kan urged the police to catch the true culprit. The parents of the five girls have also urged the police to continue investigating, as has Sugaya.

Despite acknowledging the serial nature of the cases, however, the police have not made any arrests in connection with them, and informed the mother of Mami Matsuda, the victim of the Ashikaga case, that they were no longer investigating her daughter's case due to the statute of limitations.

=== Miscarriage of justice in the Ashikaga case ===
While investigating the Ashikaga murder case, Shimizu discovered, among other things,

- That the events in the confession by Sugaya were impossible (there would not have been enough time to carry out the crime, and the victim's mother stated that her daughter could not have fit into the bicycle's basket like the confession stated)
- That two eyewitness reports regarding the culprit and the kidnapped girl (which contradicted Sugaya's confession) had not been presented in court (the descriptions of the culprit were later found to match security camera footage of the culprit in other cases)
- That there were serious issues with the DNA testing methods, with how much data were taken (no tests were done to determine the DNA of the victim or her parents) as well as contamination
- That the alleged child porn that the police claimed to have found in Sugaya's apartment did not exist (the VHS tapes seized by the police were found to be of movies including one of Indiana Jones and of porn featuring women with large breasts)

Sugaya also professes that his confession had been beaten out of him by detective Fumio Hashimoto, who had been in charge of the case.

Sugaya had previously been denied new DNA tests and a retrial despite DNA evidence presented by his lawyers and the support of the Japan Federation of Bar Associations. Shimizu reported widely on his findings, resulting in a DNA test and Sugaya's release from prison in 2009, and a retrial in 2010 which found him innocent.

Shimizu won the Editors' Choice Magazine Journalism Award for exposing this miscarriage of justice.

== Murders and kidnappings included in the case ==
1979 murder of Maya Fukushima
On 3 August 1979, five-year-old Maya Fukushima went missing while playing at a shrine near to her house in Ashikaga. Her body was found naked in a rucksack six days later abandoned next to the Watarase river.
1984 murder of Yumi Hasebe
On 17 November 1984, five-year-old Yumi Hasebe went missing from a pachinko parlor. Her body was found on 8 March 1986 in a field 1.7 kilometers away from her home.
1987 murder of Tomoko Oosawa
On 15 September 1987, eight-year-old Tomoko Oosawa left her house in Ota and went missing. Her body was found on 27 November 1988 abandoned by the Tone River.
1990 murder of Mami Matsuda
The Ashikaga murder case
1996 kidnapping of Yukari Yokoyama
On 7 July 1996, four-year-old Yukari Yokoyama went missing from a pachinko parlor. As the girl was never found, this is treated as a disappearance case.

The following are used as reasoning behind the definition of this as a serial case:

- All cases involved young girls between ages 4 and 8
- In three cases, the victim vanished from a pachinko parlor
- In three cases, the body was found next to a river (the Watarase River in two)
- Four cases happened on a Friday, weekend, or holiday

All five crimes have not been resolved, with the culprit not arrested. The case has been given extensive media coverage, and has been brought up in the Japanese Diet multiple times, and was also addressed by then-prime minister Naoto Kan, who appealed to the police to solve the case.

Security camera footage of the culprit exists from the 1996 kidnapping case, and eyewitnesses from the Ashikaga case have stated that he strongly resembles the man they saw.

In 2010 and 2011, Shimizu reported strong evidence that the perpetrator had been found, including DNA test results connecting him to the Ashikaga case (a 100% match to the results of new tests of the perpetrator's DNA) and video recordings of him talking to young girls and making them sit on his lap, and gave this information to the police, but no arrest was made. The reasoning given for the refusal to arrest the alleged perpetrator was that his DNA does not match that of the culprit previously found in the Ashikaga case.

Shimizu professes that the DNA testing methods used in the Ashikaga case were flawed, and that arresting the perpetrator would require the prosecutor's office to acknowledge this. However, the same testing methods were also used in the Iizuka case, in which the alleged culprit was executed in 2008 despite requests for new DNA tests and a retrial, and acknowledging that the testing methods were flawed would lead to a massive scandal around that case.

Shimizu's investigations into the Iizuka case found the possibility that a large amount of the evidence was doctored, and he concludes that it was the amount, and not quality of the evidence which led to the conviction, and that overturning even one piece of evidence would have caused the prosecutor's case to fall apart.

Additionally, when the mother of Mami Matsuda was informed by the police that they were no longer investigating her daughter's case due to the statute of limitations, she requested that they return her daughter's belongings, but they refused to return the shirt which has the true culprit's semen stains on it. They refused to give a straight answer as to why, and Shimizu suspects that this is because they are afraid that others might have the DNA of the true culprit tested by modern means, proving that the methods previously used returned wrong results.

== See also ==
- DNA profiling
- Judicial system of Japan
- List of fugitives from justice who disappeared
- List of kidnappings
- Lists of solved missing person cases
- Police misconduct
