= Iruma River =

Coordinates: 35°54′35″N 139°32′43″E

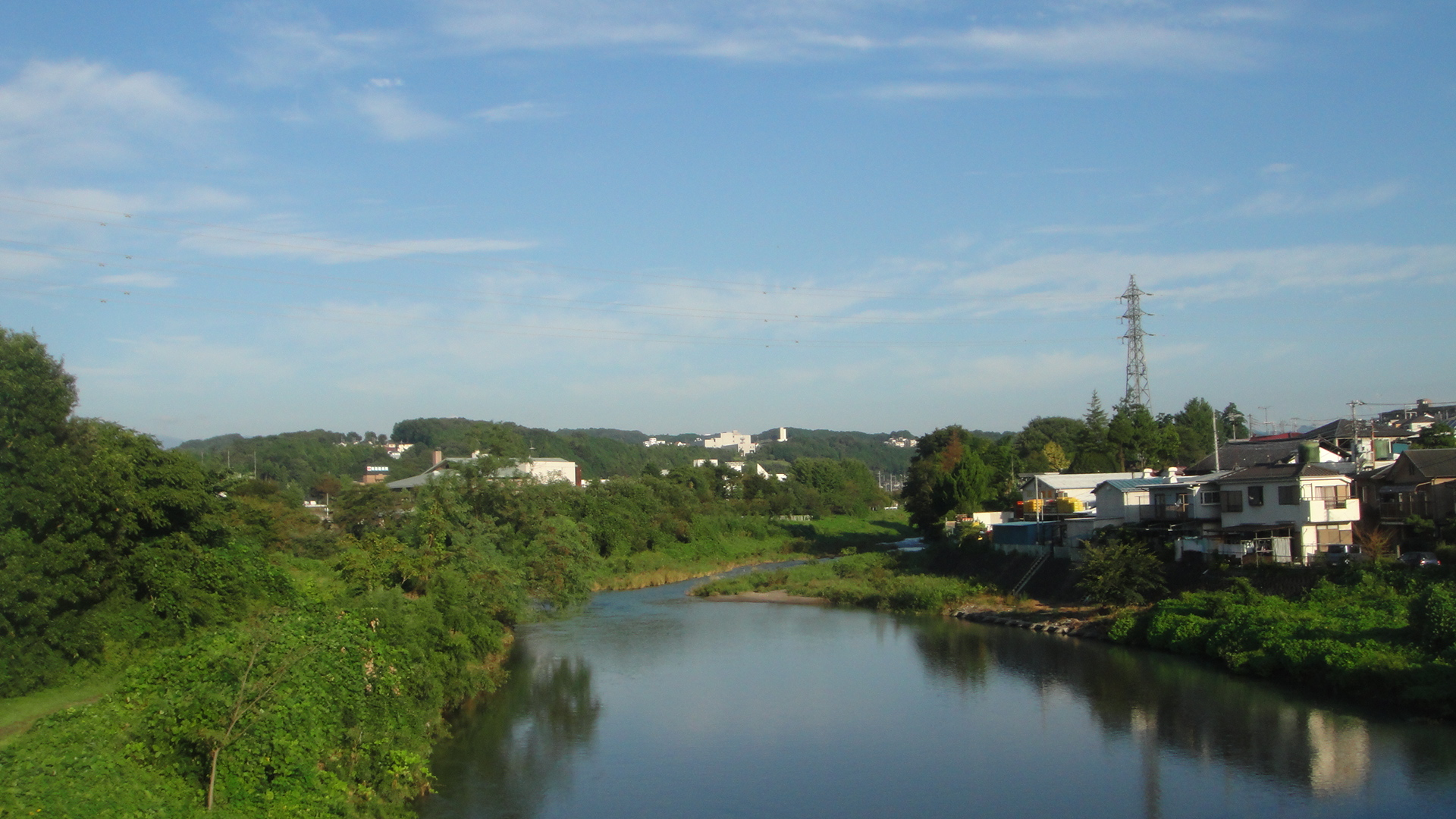
- Iruma River in Hannō, Saitama

- Native name: 入間川 (Japanese)

Location
- Country: Japan

Physical characteristics
- Source
  - location: Mount Hannō in Hannō, Saitama
  - elevation: 1,197 m (3,927 ft)
- Mouth
  - location: Arakawa River
- Length: 63 km (39 mi)
- Basin size: 721 km^{2} (278 sq mi)

The Iruma River (入間川, Iruma-gawa), is a river in Saitama Prefecture, Japan. It is 63 kilometres (39 mi) long and has a watershed of 721 square kilometres (278 sq mi). The river rises from Mount Ōmochi in Hannō, Saitama and flows to the Arakawa River at Kawagoe, Saitama. Before the flood control projects in the Edo Period, when the Ara River was diverted into its course, the Iruma River flowed on its own into Edo Bay.
