= Ashikaga murder case =

1990 child murder in Ashikaga, Japan

Mami Matsuda
- Born: 1986; Japan
- Died: May 12, 1990 (aged 4); Ashikaga, Tochigi Prefecture, Japan
- Cause of death: Murder
- Known for: Victim of unsolved murder

The Ashikaga murder case (足利事件, Ashikaga jiken) occurred in the city of Ashikaga, Tochigi Prefecture, Japan, when a 4-year-old girl, Mami Matsuda, went missing from a pachinko parlor on May 12, 1990, and was found dead at the Watarase River nearby. This case is part of the North Kanto Serial Young Girl Kidnapping and Murder Case.

== History ==
In 1991, Toshikazu Sugaya was arrested and convicted of the murder based on primitive DNA evidence. However, in 2007, the journalist Kiyoshi Shimizu, who was given leeway to investigate the case after winning awards for previous reporting, discovered that the DNA testing method was imprecise. In 2009, when Sugaya's DNA was checked again against the evidence, it conclusively showed that he was innocent. He was released in May 2009, after having been imprisoned for seventeen years. Moreover, the prosecutor's office has stated that since the statute of limitations has passed, the perpetrator of the crime could no longer be brought to justice. However, the statute of limitations on the last case in the overall North Kanto case has not yet passed, and the police have been urged by multiple government officials, including then-Prime Minister Naoto Kan to solve it.

Shimizu won the Editors' Choice Magazine Journalism Award for exposing the miscarriage of justice. In 2010 and 2011, he reported strong evidence, including DNA evidence, that the perpetrator had been found, and gave this information to the police, but no arrest was made. The reasoning given for the refusal is that the alleged perpetrator's DNA does not match that of the culprit previously found in the Ashikaga case. Shimizu professes that the DNA testing methods used in the case were flawed, and that arresting the perpetrator would require the prosecutor's office to acknowledge this. However, the same testing methods were also used in the Iizuka case, in which the alleged culprit was executed in 2008 despite requests for new DNA tests and a retrial, and acknowledging that the testing methods were flawed would lead to a massive scandal.

== Events leading up to the trial ==
=== A series of murders ===
A series of murders of young girls occurred around Ashikaga city from 1979 to 2005. Toshikazu Sugaya was arrested and indicted on the 1990 case.

- August 3, 1979, a five-year-old girl was kidnapped and found dead in a backpack on August 9, 1979, near the Watarase River.
- November 17, 1984, a five-year-old girl was kidnapped and found dead on March 8, 1986, at a field east of Okubo elementary school in Ashikaga City.
- May 12, 1990, a four-year-old girl was kidnapped and found dead on May 13, 1990, at the Watarase River.
- June 7, 1996, a four-year-old girl was kidnapped and her body was never found.
- December 1, 2005, a seven-year-old girl was kidnapped and found dead.

In addition, two murders of young girls occurred in Ohta City, Gunma Prefecture, on the prefecture's border with Ashikaga City.

== See also ==
- DNA profiling
- Judicial system of Japan
- List of kidnappings
- List of unsolved murders (1980–1999)
- North Kanto Serial Young Girl Kidnapping and Murder Case
- Police misconduct
- West Memphis Three
- Murder of Yasuko Watanabe
