= Ayase River =

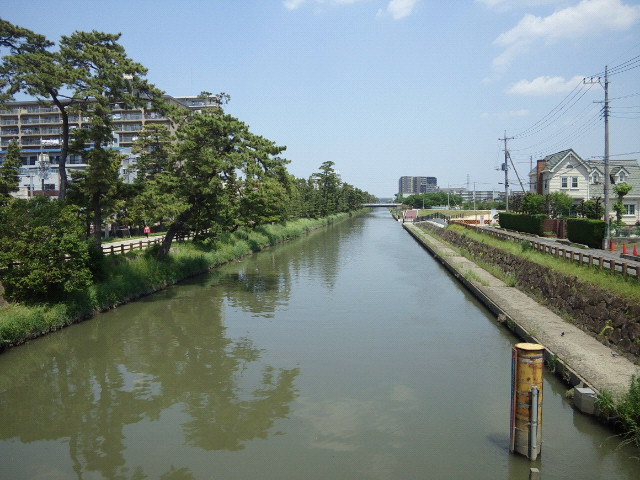
- Ayase River in Sōka, Saitama, Japan

- Location within Japan

Location
- Country: Japan
- Region: Kantō

Physical characteristics
- Source
  - location: Okegawa
- Mouth: Naka River
  - location: Katsushika
  - coordinates: 35°43′22″N 139°50′33″E
- Length: 47 km (29 mi)
- Basin size: 178 km^{2} (69 sq mi)
- Discharge
  - location: Okegawa, Saitama

Basin features
- River system: Ara river basin

The Ayase River (綾瀬川, Ayase-gawa) is a river in Japan.

== Geography ==
The Ayase River, takes its source in the city of Okegawa in Saitama Prefecture then joins the Naka River in Katsushika, Tokyo. The latter flows into the river Arakawa River, 2 km (1.2 mi) before Tokyo Bay.

== Development ==
The course of the river was developed in Edo period (1603-1868), when Edo (old name of Tokyo) became the shogunal capital of Japan. Historically, the first part of the river is used for irrigation and agriculture, the middle and the end for the supply of water to the population of Tokyo and for river transport (the Ayase river notably allows the connection between the Arakawa and Tone).

The river caused several major floods.

== Pollution ==
From the 1960s to the 1990s, the river was the most polluted in Japan, occupying twenty-five times the head of the classification of the most polluted rivers between 1972 and 2007. The pollution, which was caused by agricultural and industrial activities and the density of the population in close proximity to the riverbanks, led to cleanup projects in the late 1990s and during the 2000s.

== Gallery ==
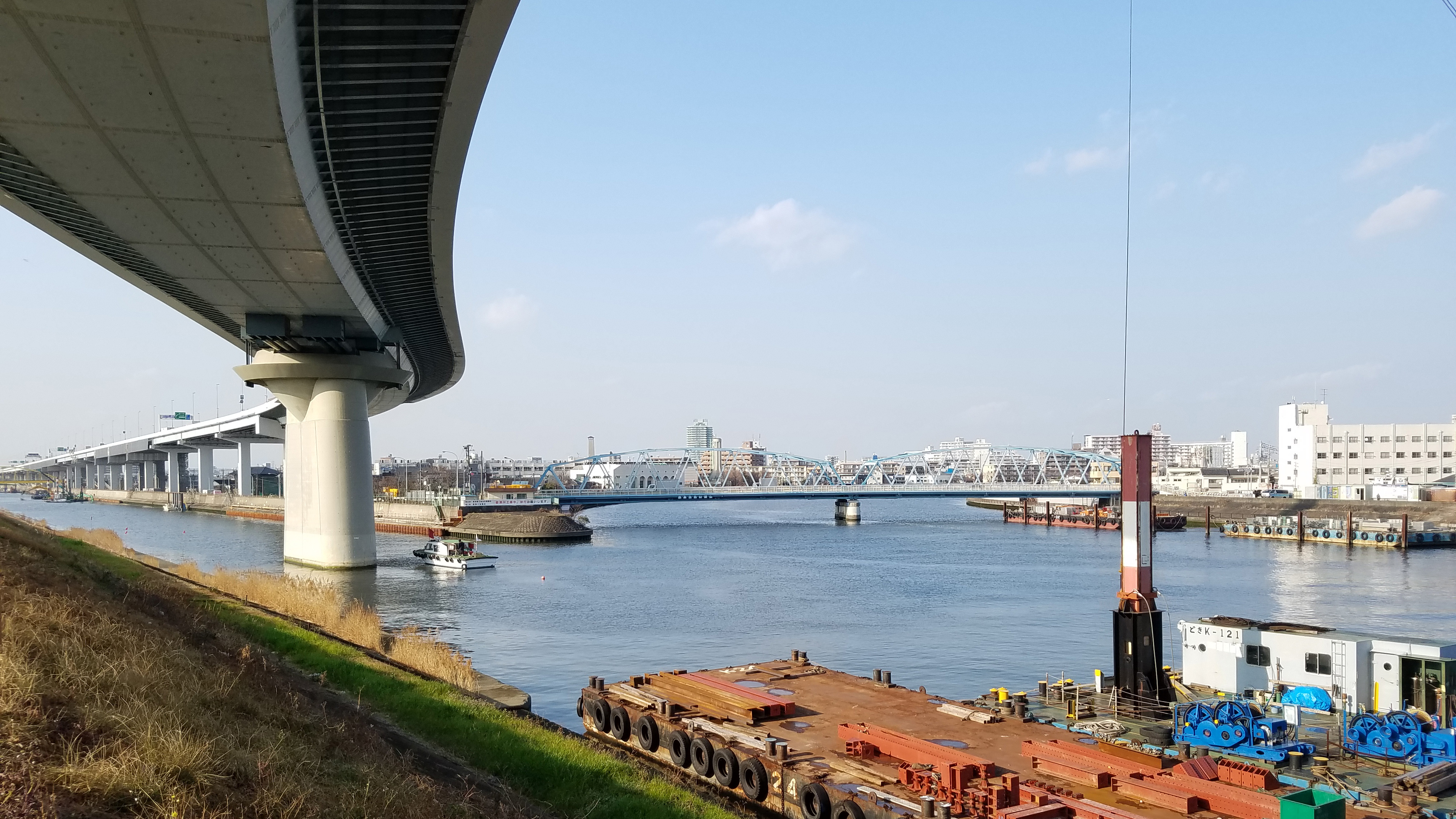
Confluence of Ayase-gawa and Naka-gawa in Tokyo.

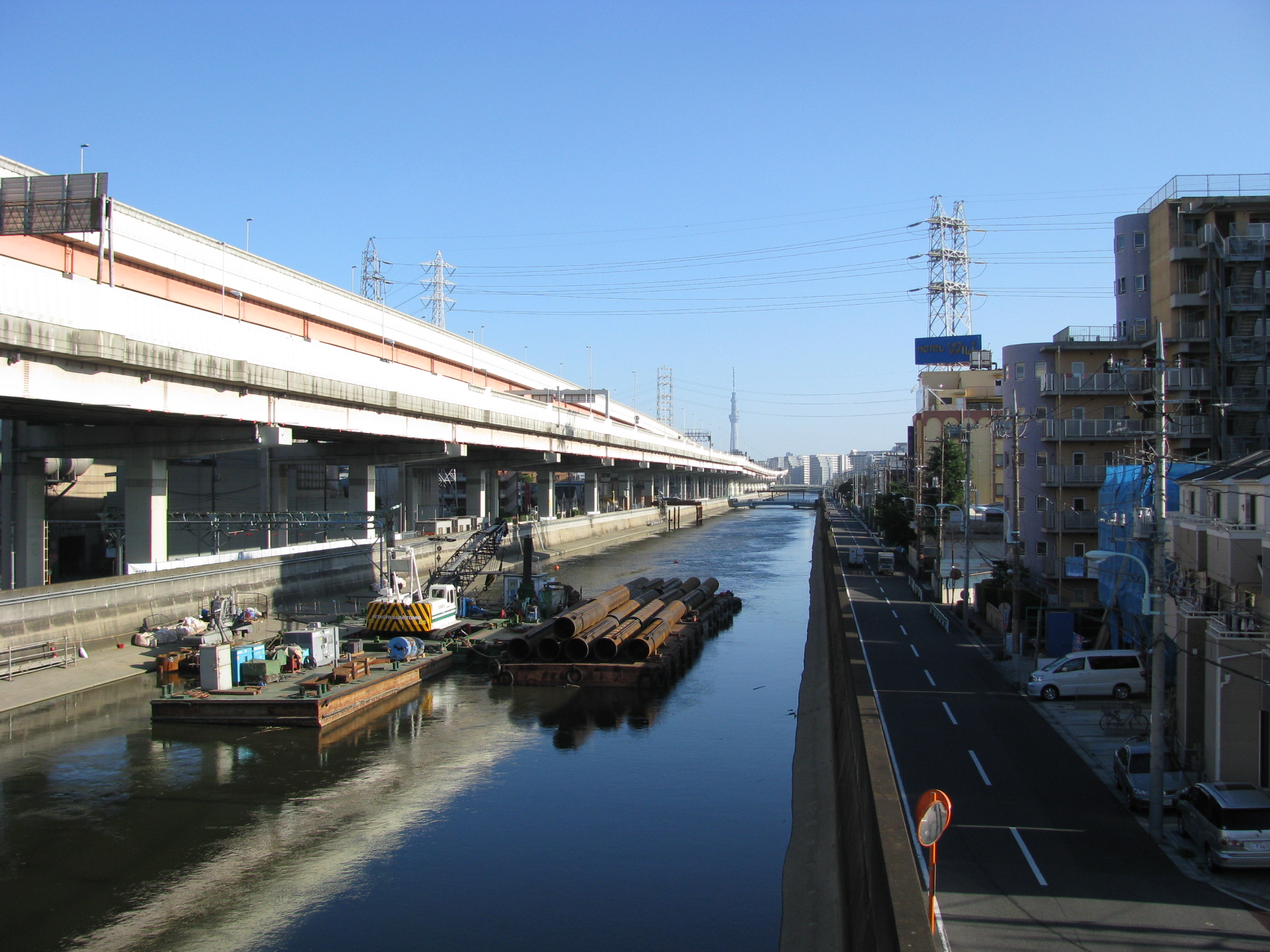
Ayase-gawa in Tokyo in the Adachi district.

Ayase River flowing in Saitama, 2023

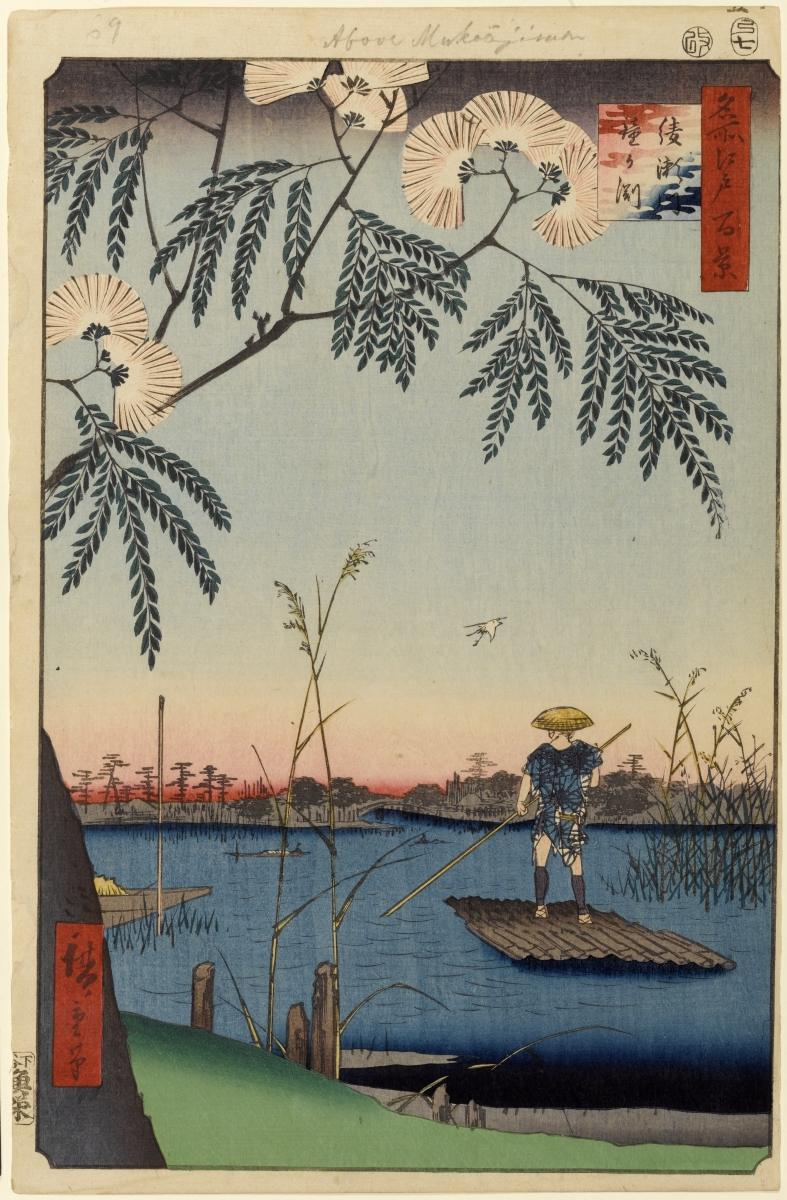
Ayase river depicted in 1857
