= Tone River Eastward Diversion =

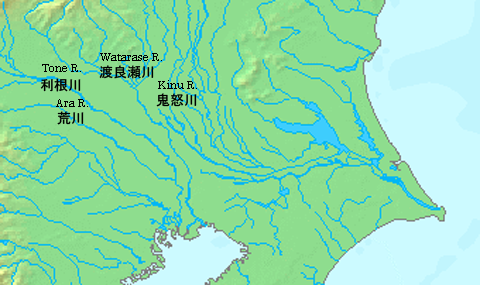
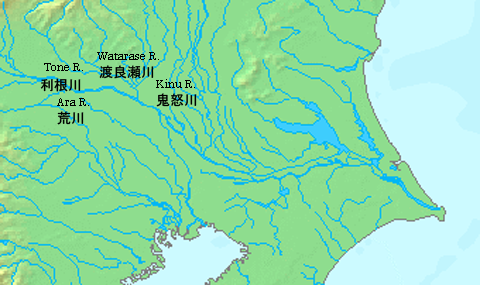
- Kantō rivers in the 16th century Kantō rivers in the 20th century
- Type of project: River engineering
- Location: Kantō Plain
- Country: Japan
- Key people: Ina Tadatsugu; Ina Tadaharu

The Tone River Eastward Diversion (Japanese: 利根川東遷) encompasses a series of river engineering projects during the Edo Period that resulted in significant course changes of all major rivers in the Kantō Plain. Most notably, the Tone River course was diverted from its original southward course, where it discharged into Edo Bay, to an eastward course, where it presently discharges into the Pacific Ocean at Chōshi.

== Background ==
Before the first major engineering projects in the 1590s, the Tone River, coming from the west, split near Hanyū, Saitama into two courses: the Asama course flowing north-east before turning south, and the Ai course flowing southeast. The two would eventually meet near Kurihashi, Saitama and flow south toward Edo Bay along what are presently the Old Tone River and Sumida River. The Watarase River came down from the north-west at Koga, Ibaraki and interconnected with the Tone River flowing south via the Gongendō course near Kurihashi. From that point onward, it flowed roughly parallel to the Tone into Edo Bay through a separate mouth. The Watarase's course was separated by a couple kilometers to the east of Tone, where the upper half was called the Shōnai River, while the lower half was called the Futoi River. The Shōnai course was slightly to the west of the present-day Edo River (non-existent at the time), while the Futoi course coincided with the present-day Edo River.

A major tributary of the Tone River was the Ara River, whose course was roughly southeast and followed the present-day Ayase River, with confluence being near Katsushika close to Edo Bay. Another major river, the Iruma River, also flowed roughly in the southeast course several kilometers south of the Ara. The Iruma had its own mouth into Edo Bay.

On the eastern part of the Kantō Plain, the two major rivers were the Kinu River coming south from the Nikkō Mountains in the northwest, and the Kokai River coming south in parallel from the northeast. They had conflugence south of Jōsō, after which the Kinu turned east and discharged into the Pacific Ocean at Chōshi.

== History ==
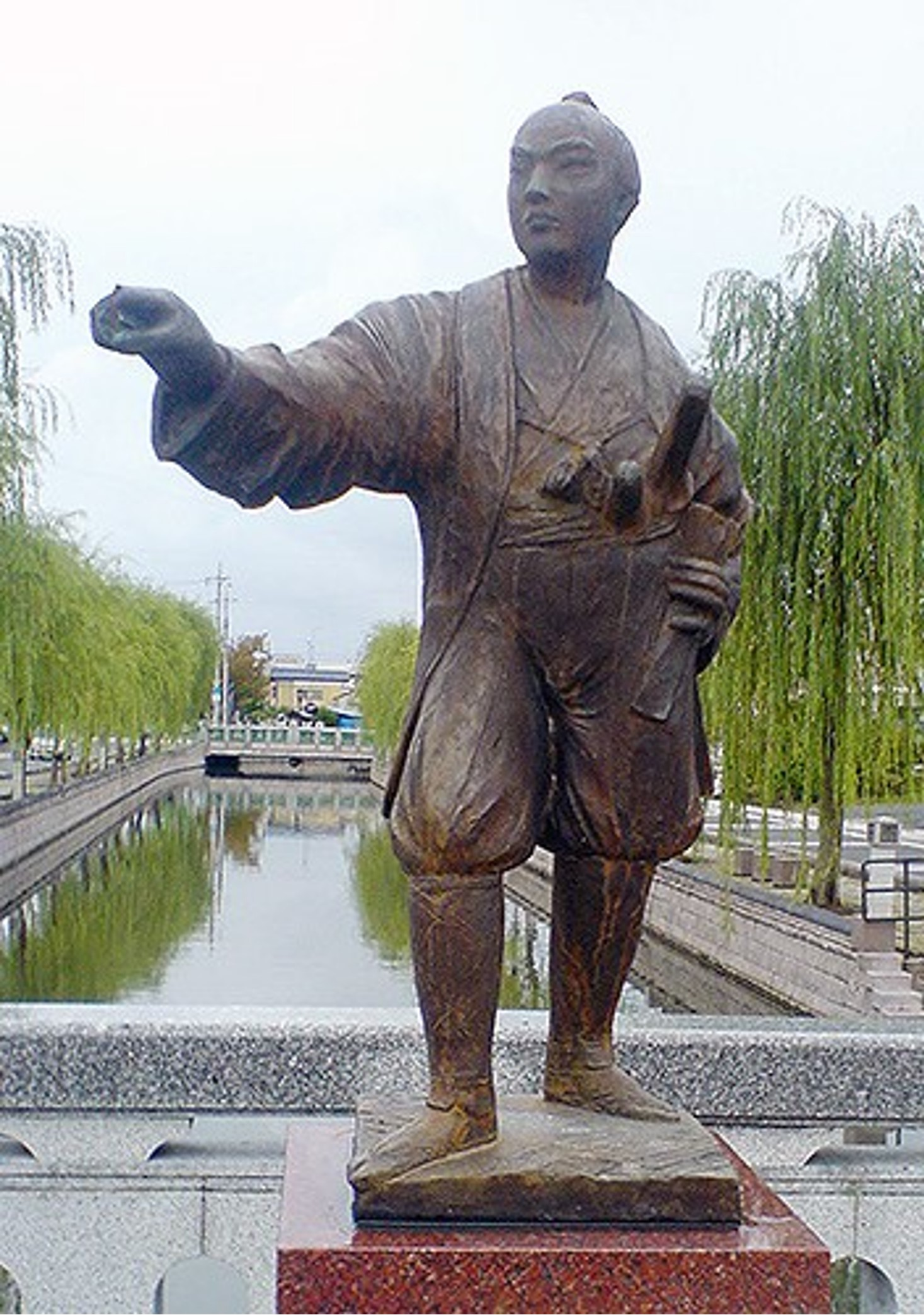
A statue of Ina Tadatsugu in Mito, Ibaraki.

Typically, the beginning of the Tone River Eastward Diversion is considered the river engineering work initiated by Ina Tadatsugu, who was, at the time, appointed the Regional Governor of Kantō (Japanese: 関東郡代), as a retainer of Tokugawa Ieyasu. However, it is highly unlikely that these initial projects had the official goal to divert the Tone eastward and change its mouth. It is also not fully clear what the main purpose of the projects was, where the key possible ones are: improving flood control, improving navigability of waterways for transportation, and land reclamation and development.

Ina Tadatsugu died in 1610 and was replaced by his eldest son, Tadamasa, who continued his work. Tadamasa died in 1618 and was replaced by his younger brother, Ina Tadaharu, who was involved in some of the major changes and improvements of the Kantō river systems until his death in 1653. This series of projects would eventually divert the Tone River into the Watarase's Shōnai course, divert the Ara River into the Iruma River, separate the confluence of the Kinu River and the Kokai River by moving the Kinu River further west, and connect the Tone River to the Kinu River.

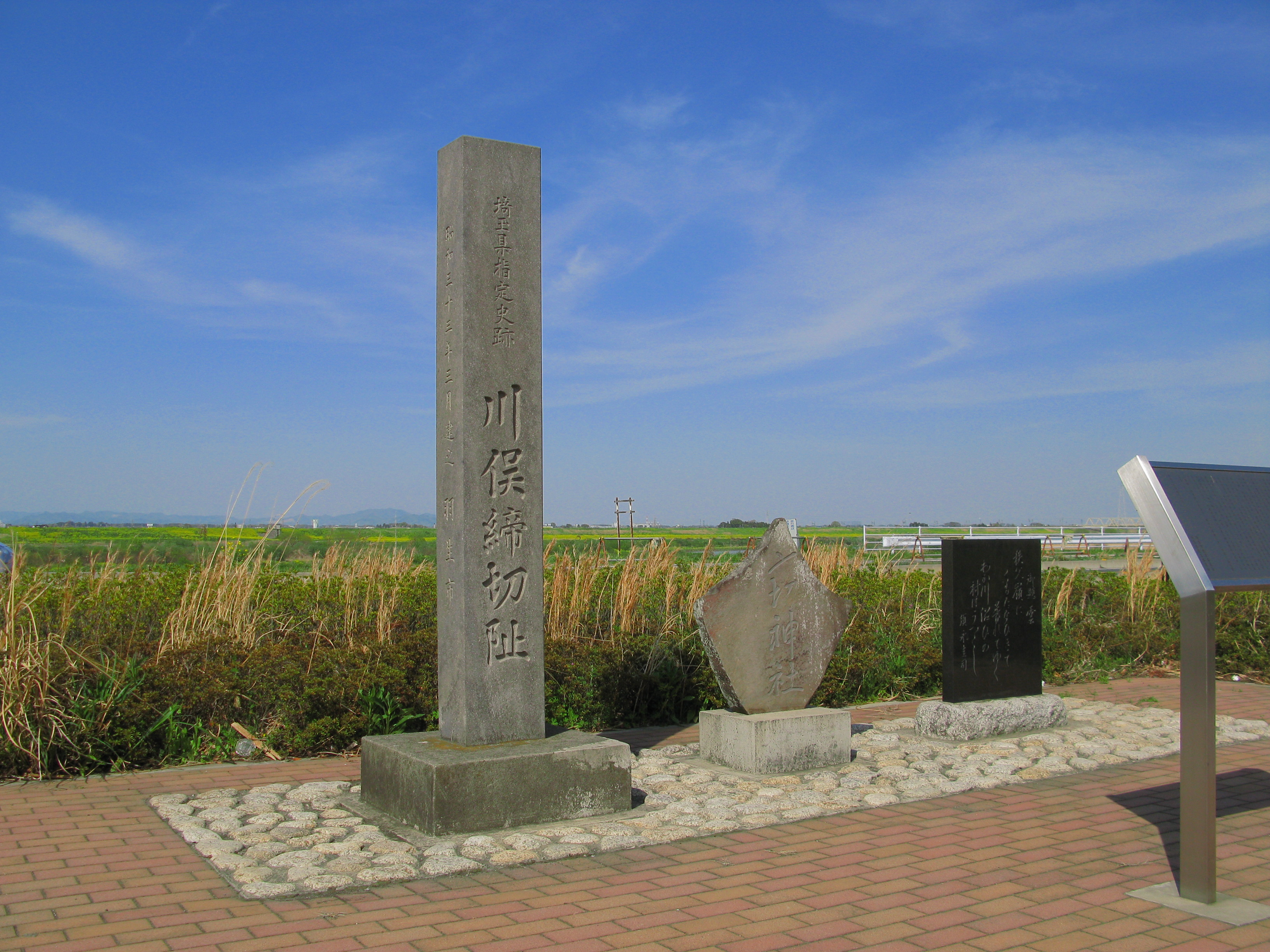
A stone monument near Hanyū, Saitama, marking the site of the dam for the Aino route of the Tone River.

The timeline of the major events:

- 1594: The Old Tone River southern course was dammed near Takayanagi, and the flow was diverted into the Shōnai course of the Watarase River via the Shima Canal.
- 1594: The Aino course of Tone was dammed to divert all the flow via the Asama River.
- 1596~1616: The Ara River was dammed and diverted from the Ayase route into what was then the Hoshikawa River (what is present-day Motoara River) that changed the confluence with the Tone River further north to Yoshikawa, Saitama.
- 1621: The Shinkawa-dori Canal was created as an alternative to the Asama route in an attempt to straighten the Tone River. This canal would eventually become the main course of the Tone, but at that time, most of the water still flowed via the Asama route.

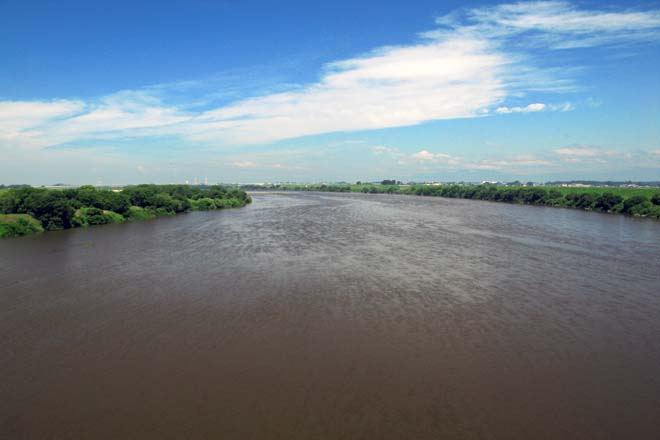
The present-day Akabori section of the Tone River, which started as a man-made canal and was the key in connecting it to the Kinu River basin.

- 1621: The Akabori Canal, with a 13-meter width, was created to connect the Tone River from the Shinkawa-dori Canal to the Kinu River using the upper reaches of the Hitachi River. However, the canal was not sufficient to provide a stable water level throughout the year or to have significant flood relief capacity. Furthermore, the Hitachi River was not large and would require a significant amount of water from the Tone to enable good navigability.
- 1629: The Kinu River was separated from the Kokai River at their confluence and diverted to join the Hitachi River about 30 kilometers upstream. This increased the water in the Hitachi River and improved transportation capacity.
- 1629: The old northern course of the Ara River was dammed and connected to the Iruma River via its tributary, the Wada-Yoshino River. This made the Iruma River the new southern course of the Ara River, while the old northern course became the Motoara River.
- 1635: The Akabori Canal was widened to 18 meters. However, the canal was still not sufficient to provide a stable water level throughout the year or to have significant flood relief capacity.
- 1635-1644: The Edo River was being constructed to be connected to the Futoi River as an alternative to the Shōnai route for Tone/Watarase discharge into Edo Bay.

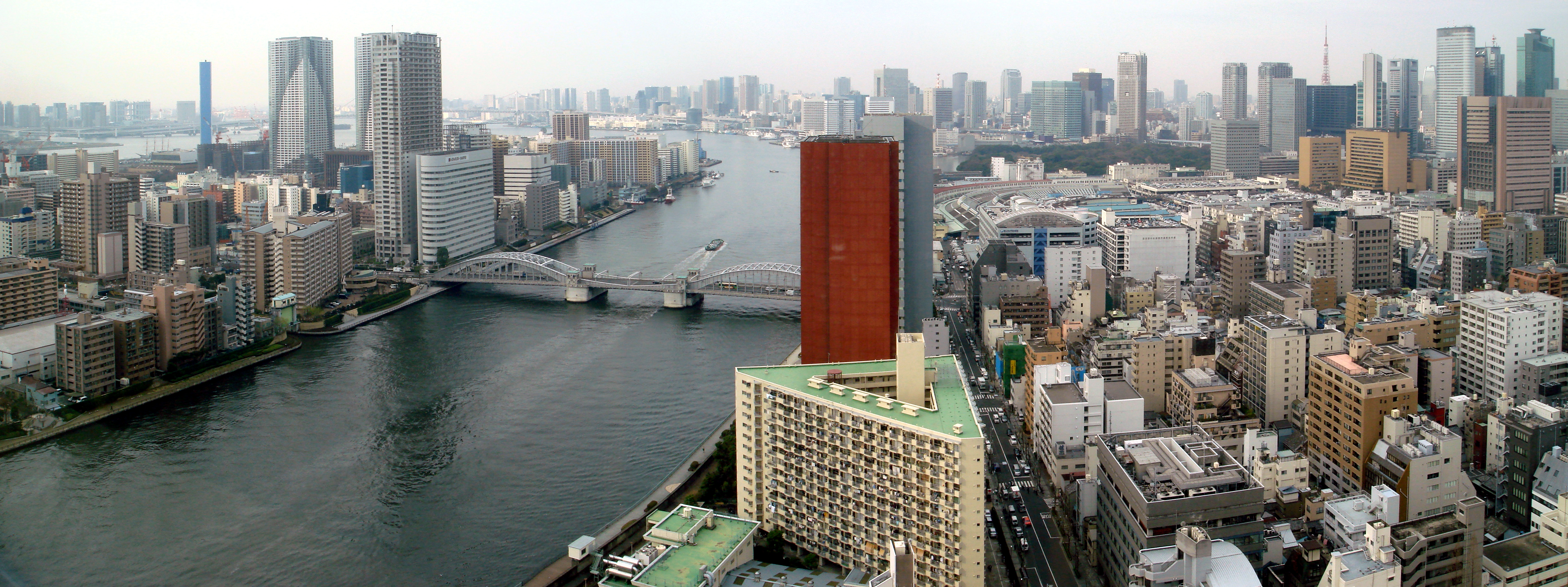
The present-day Sumida River in Tokyo Bay, where the original mouth of the Tone River was.

- 1654: The Shōnai River was dammed to make the Edo River the main access for the Tone River to Edo Bay. This was done in an attempt to prevent flooding of the Shōnai Domain and to provide a more navigable waterway with a deeper channel.
- 1654: Improvements to the Akabori Canal were made by increasing the depth to 5.4 meters. This finally enabled a stable water level supply for navigation from Chōshi via the Kinu and Hitachi rivers to Edo via the Edo River.
- 1698: The Akabori Canal was widened to 49 meters to further increase the flow from the Tone River.
- 1783: The Mount Asama Eruption deposited a large amount of material into the Tone River, causing more frequent floods.
- 1809: The Akabori Canal was widened to 72 meters.
- 1838: The Asama route was dammed, and the Shinkawa-dori Canal finally became the main course of the Tone River.
- 1912-1917: The Akabori Canal was widened to 545 meters, finally completing the eastward diversion of the Tone River.

== Purpose ==
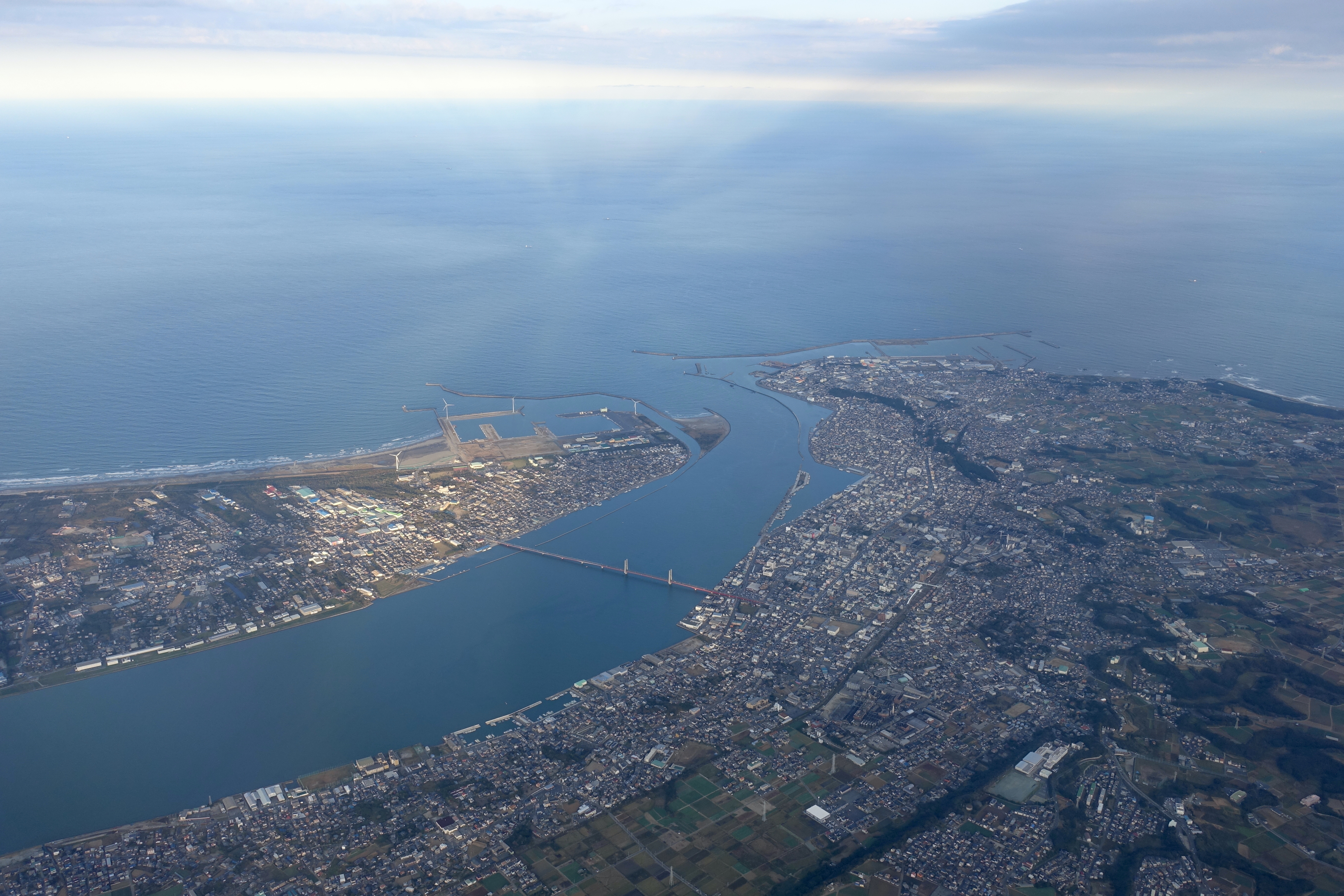
The present-day mouth of the Tone River at Chōshi, which used to be the mouth of the Kinu River.

The purpose of the series of many projects was likely a combination of improving flood control, improving navigability of waterways for transportation, and land reclamation and development. The most significant result was the diversion of the Tone River to the east. However, it is unlikely this was an official plan of the Tokugawa Shogunate from the onset. Throughout much of the Edo Period, the amount of water that flowed into the Kinu River basin via the Hitachi River was relatively small. Thus, it is likely that the initial purpose was mainly to enable river navigability between the Saitama Plain and the Shimōsa Plateau. To keep enough water in the Edo River for transport, the Akabori Canal was to be kept very narrow, so as not to take too much water to the Hitachi River. Only after the Mount Asama Eruption was it significantly widened. In terms of flood control, by the early 20th century, only one major river (Ara) was discharging into Tokyo Bay, compared to three (Tone, Watarase, and Ara) at the end of the 16th century.

== See also ==
- Delta Works

== Sources ==
- 澤口, 宏 (2000). 利根川東遷・人によって作られた利根川の謎を探る. Gunma, Japan: 上毛新聞社. ISBN 4880587788.
- Inazaki, Tomio; Ota, Yoko; Maruyama, Shigenori (September 2014). "The Largest and Longest Project in Japan-Spanning over 400 Years: River Improvement Works in the Kanto Plain and Constraints of Tectonic Setting". Journal of Geography (Chigaku Zasshi). 123 (4). Tokyo Geographical Society: 401–433. doi:10.5026/jgeography.123.389.
- Trošelj, Joško; Hanasaki, Naota (February 2025). "Simulating the Tone River eastward diversion project in Japan carried out 4 centuries ago". Hydrology and Earth System Sciences. 29 (3). European Geosciences Union (EGU): 753–766. Bibcode:2025HESS...29..753T. doi:10.5194/hess-29-753-2025.
