= Okubo water purification plant =

Japanese water purification plant located in Saitama City

Coordinates: 35°52′30″N 139°35′24″E

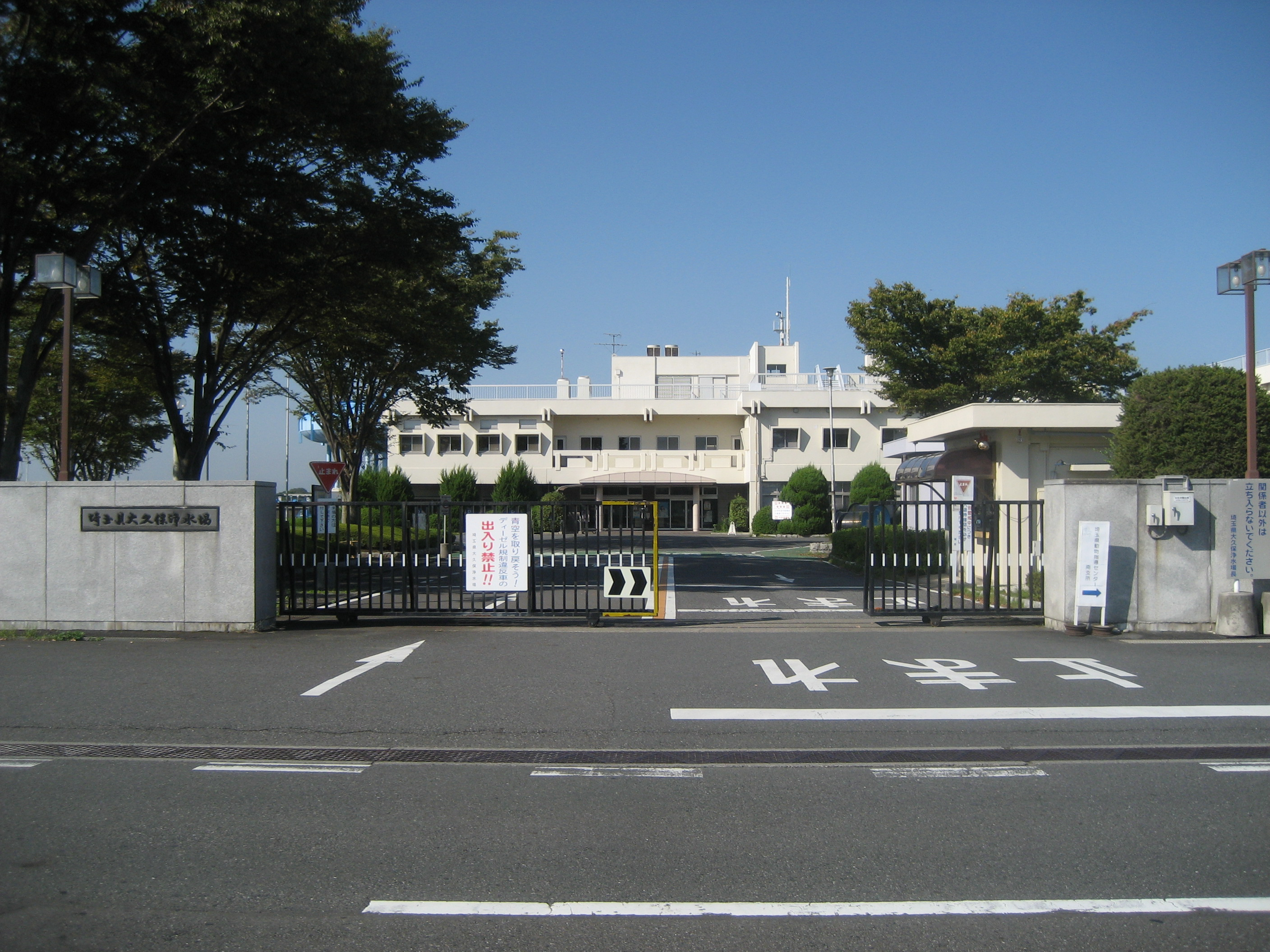
Okubo water filtration plant

Okubo water purification plant is a prefectural water purification plant located in Sakura-ku, Saitama City, Saitama Prefecture, Japan. The drinking water is supplied to about 3.8 million people in 15 cities and 1 town in the southern and western regions of Saitama prefecture. The maximum daily water supply capacity is 1.3 million cubic meters. Water is supplied to Saitama (excluding Iwatsuki Ward), Kawagoe, Kawaguchi, Tokorozawa, Hanno, Sayama, Warabi, Toda, Iruma City, Asaka, Shiki, Wako, Niiza, Fujimino, Fujimino, Miyoshi.

== History ==
During the period of high economic growth in the Showa era, it was decided that a water purification plant would be built in the Okubo district on the outskirts of the former Urawa city, where the prefectural office was located, in order to meet the rapidly increasing demand in the southern part of Saitama prefecture. Arakawa River is the source of water in the intake.

The plant construction started in March 1964 (Showa 39) and water supply started in April 1968 (Showa 43).

== Facility ==
The daily maximum water supply capacity of the plant is 1.3 million cubic meters and industrial water processing capacity of 93,000 cubic meters. The cumulative water pipe is 349 km covering an area of 475,920 square meters.

The infrastructures comprises:

- Intake for drinking water: 2
- Intake for industrial use : 1
- Settling basin: 4 ponds
- Intake pump: 11 (drinking) + 6 (industrial)
- Aqueduct: 2 (drinking)+1
- Agitation pond-Tap water: 19(drinking) + 2 (industrial)
- Flock formation pond: 39 (drinking)+ 5 (industrial)
- Settling basin-Tap water: 39(drinking)+ 5 (industrial)
- Rapid sand filter pond : 86
- Purified water pond: 10 (drinking)+ 2 (industrial)
- PC water purification pond: 6
- Water distribution: 27(drinking)+ 6 (industrial)
- Relay pump station:1 location
