= Arakawa clan =

The Arakawa clan (荒川氏, Arakawa-shi) was a Japanese samurai family which descended from Minamoto no Tsunemoto (894–961) of the Seiwa-Genji.

== History ==
Arakawa was the original surname of the family which began calling itself "Ina clan" when it moved to the Ina region in Shinano Province in modern-day Nagano Prefecture. This move was ordered by the Ashikaga shogunate in the 15th century.
