= Ina Tadatsugu =

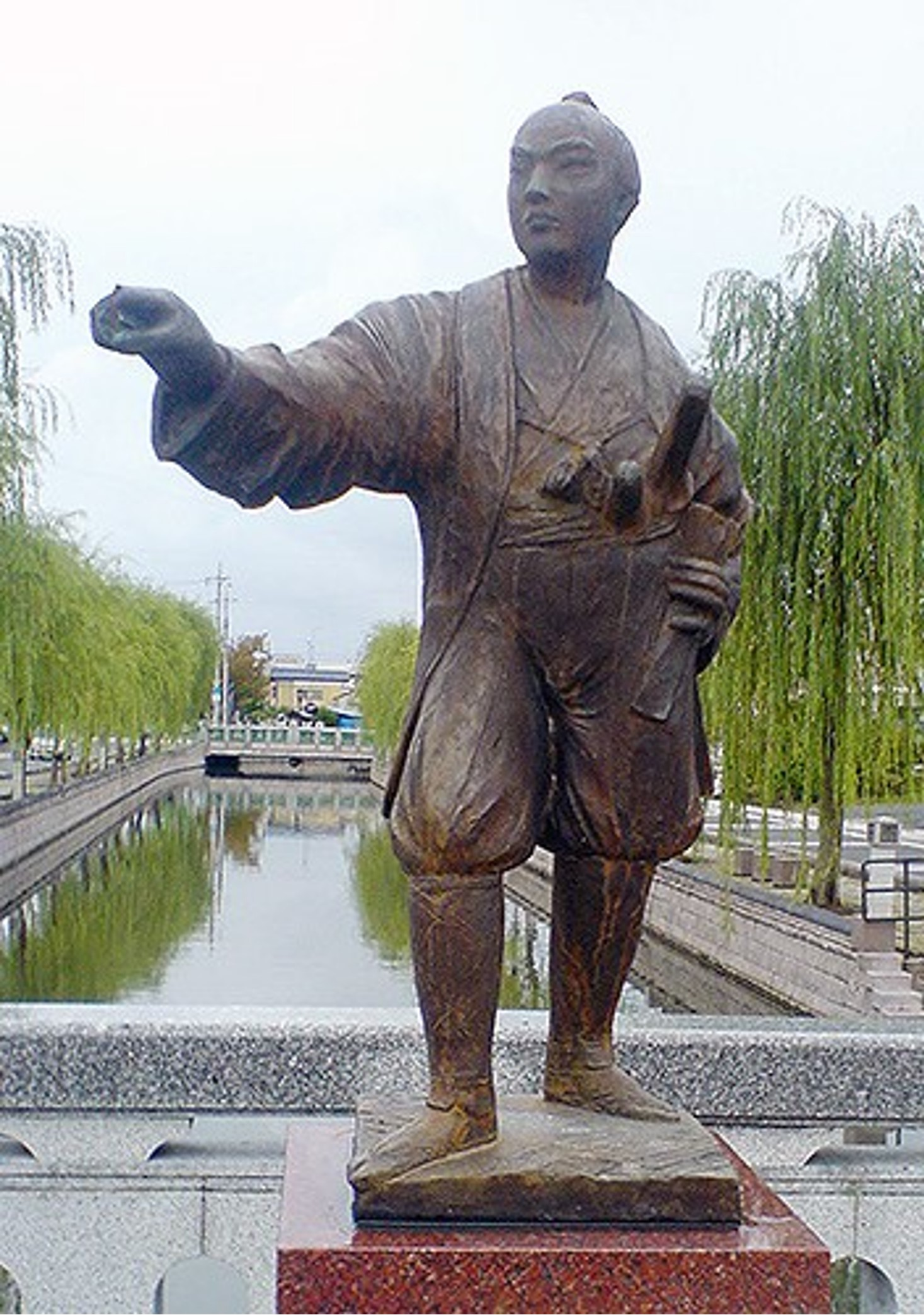
Statute of Ina Tadatsugu

Ina Tadatsugu (伊奈 忠次; 1550 – August 1, 1610) was a Japanese samurai of the Sengoku period and Edo period.

He was the son of a Mikawa samurai who served Tokugawa Ieyasu. Twice forced into wandering, he returned to Ieyasu's service after the Honnoji Incident. It is said that during these years he acquired practical skills in civil engineering. From then on, he contributed to Tokugawa Ieyasu's rise in two ways: as a samurai and as a technical administrator.

Tadatsugu was less a feudal lord than a military engineer-administrator. He supervised bridges, transport, flood control, and land development during the formation of Tokugawa rule in eastern Japan.

== Achievements ==
Tadatsugu is primarily recognized for his pioneering work in flood control and irrigation in the Kanto region. His most significant achievement was initiating the Tone River Eastward Diversion Project in 1594 to protect Edo from flooding and facilitate the development of new rice fields. He also constructed numerous infrastructure projects, such as the Senju Ohashi Bridge(in north Edo area), and developed extensive irrigation canals known as "Bizen-bori" which was named for his role, which transformed marshes into productive agricultural land.

== Personality ==
Stories about Ina Tadatsugu portray him as both a warrior and a hard-driving administrator.

- Before the Siege of Odawara, he reportedly supervised the construction of an elegant reception pavilion for Toyotomi Hideyoshi and earned praise for its speed and quality.
- After the campaign, he impressed Tokugawa Ieyasu with his swift and practical management of captured military supplies.
- One story claims that while serving as a regional governor, Tadatsugu personally executed local bandits with his own sword.

== See also ==
- Ina clan
