= Kinugawa River =

River in Japan

Coordinates: 35°56′16″N 139°57′02″E

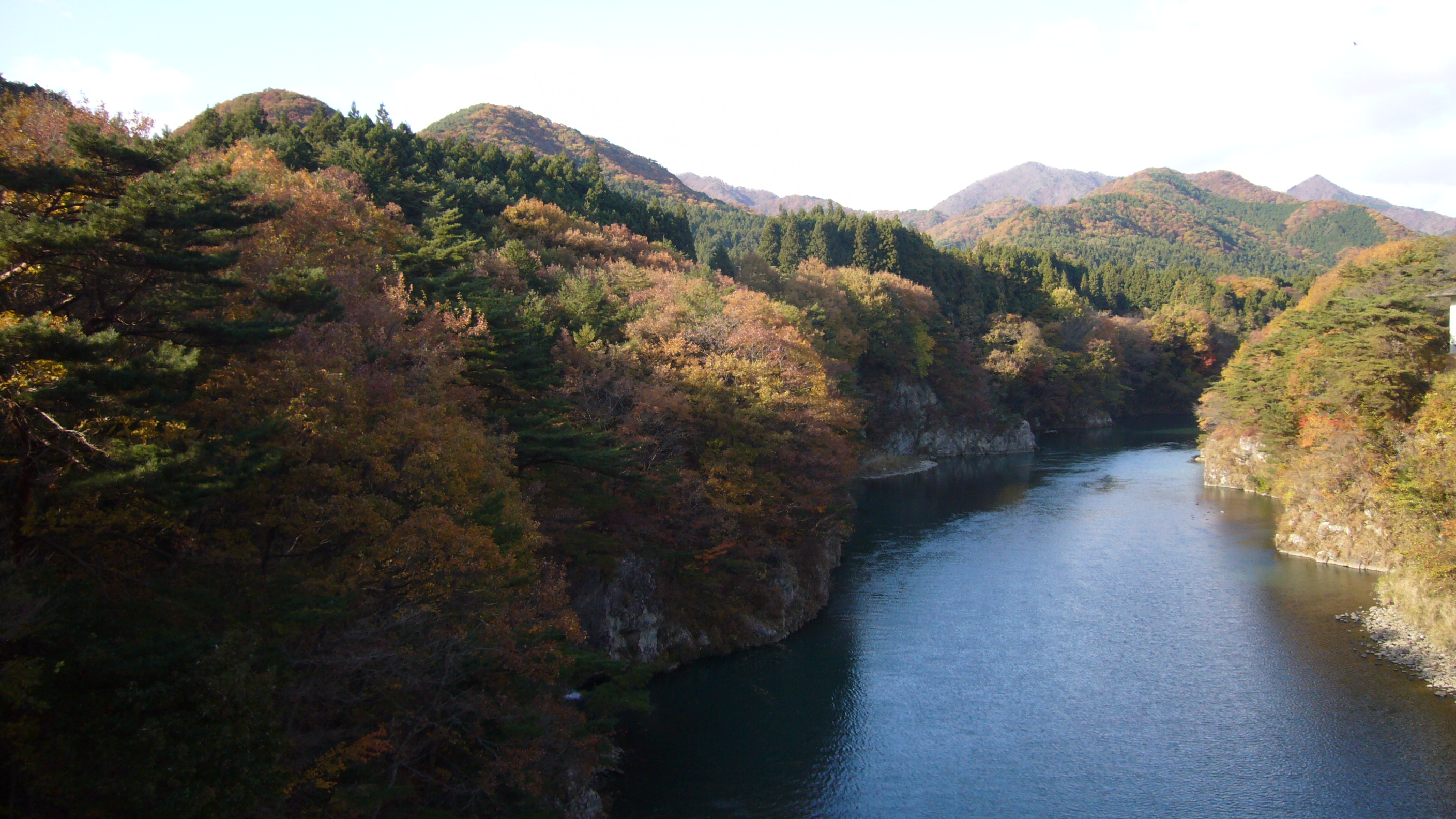

- Location within Japan

Kinugawa River, Kinugawa, or Kinu River (鬼怒川, Kinu-gawa), is a river on the main island of Honshu in Japan. It flows from the north to the south on the Kantō plain, merging with Tone River (利根川, Tone-gawa). At 176.7 km in length, it is the longest tributary of Tone-gawa. Before the river engineering projects in the Edo Period, when the Tone River was diverted into its course, the Kinu River flowed on its own into the Pacific Ocean. From ancient times, it has been known to cause floods. The river starts in Kinu swamp in the city of Nikkō, Tochigi, within Nikkō National Park.

== 2015 Flood ==
Due to heavy rainfall for three consecutive days, on 10 September 2015, the river bank was breached, causing a flood, resulting in the death of two people and several more injuries. In Joso city, homes and infrastructure were damaged.

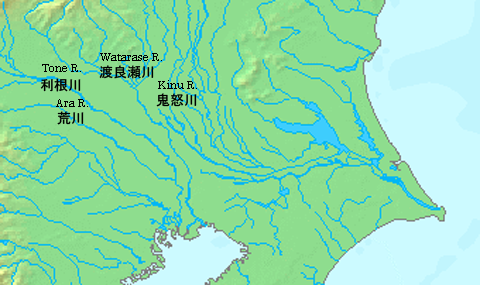
Rivers in Kantō at 16c.

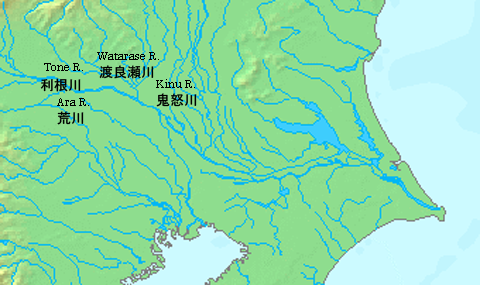
Rivers in Kantō at 20c.

== See also ==
- Kinugawa Onsen, a spa town within Nikkō
- Keno Province
