= Ina clan =

Ina clan (伊奈氏, Ina-shi) was a Japanese samurai family which descended from Minamoto no Tsunemoto (894-961) of the Seiwa-Genji.

== History ==
The original surname of the family was "Arakawa", but the clan began calling itself "Ina" when it moved to the Ina region in Shinano Province in modern-day Nagano Prefecture. This move was ordered by the Ashikaga shogunate in the 15th century.

In 1590, Ina Tadatsugu was established in Musashi Province at Komoro Domain with 13,000 koku revenues. After the Battle of Sekigahara in 1600, the han was increased to 20,000 koku. However, the clan was dispossessed in 1613 because of Ina Tadamasa's part in a plot organized by Okubo Nagayasu.

The clan were hatamoto until the Meiji period.

== Select list of clan members ==
- Ina Tadatsugu
- Ina Tadamasa
