= Arakawa River (Kantō) =

River in Kantō, Japan

Coordinates: 36°08′10″N 139°22′06″E

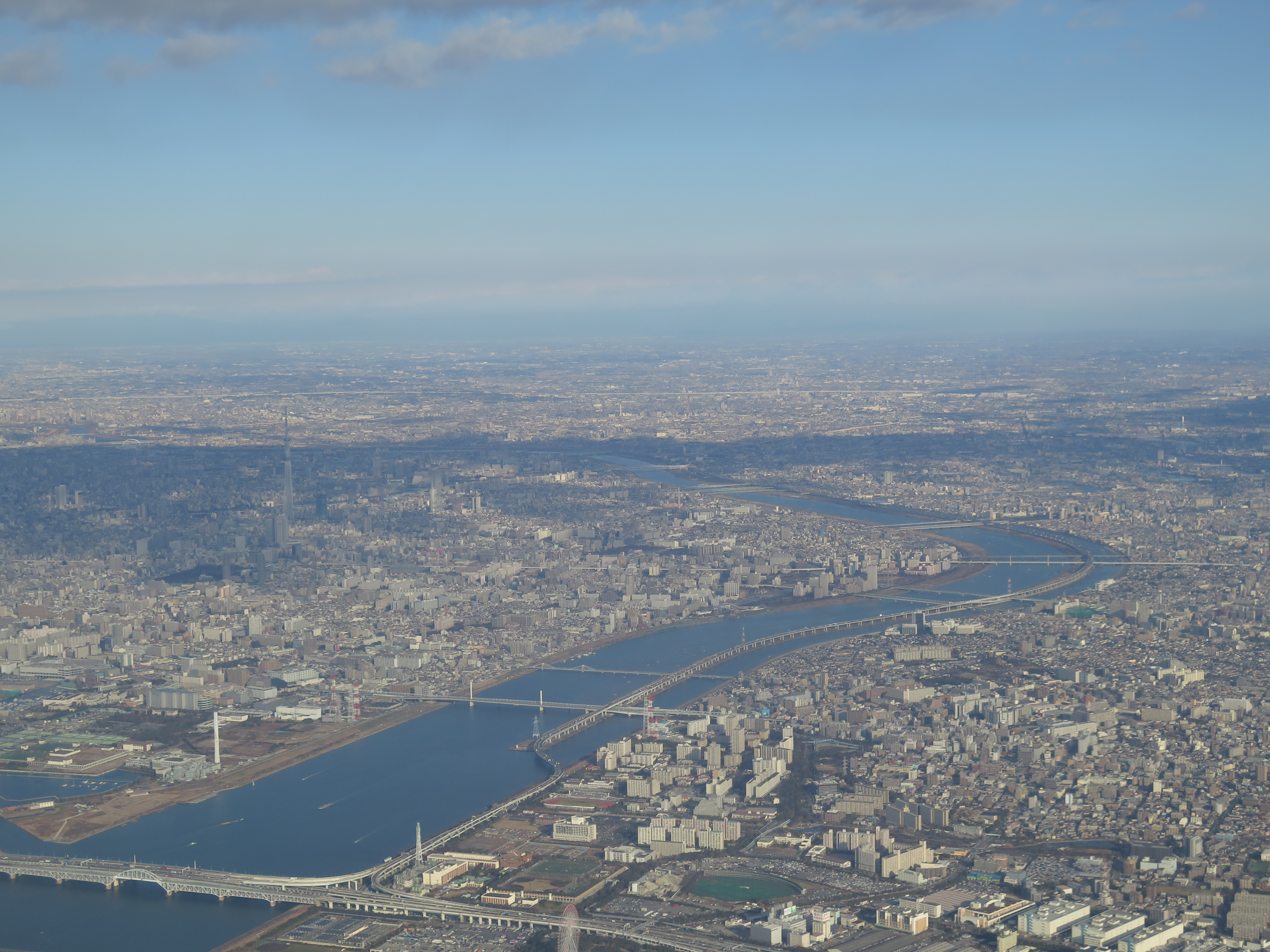
- A bend in the Arakawa River

- Location of mouth in Japan
- Native name: 荒川 (Japanese)

Location
- Country: Japan

Physical characteristics
- Source
  - location: Mount Kobushi (甲武信ヶ岳)
  - elevation: 2,475 m (8,120 ft)
- Mouth
  - location: Tokyo Bay
- Length: 173 km (107 mi)

Basin features
- River system: Arakawa

The Arakawa River or Ara River (Japanese: 荒川, Hepburn: Arakawa; "kawa" (川) already means "river") is a 173-kilometre (107 mi) long river that flows through Saitama Prefecture and Tokyo. Its average flow in 2002 was 30 m^{3}/s (1,100 cu ft/s).

It originates on Mount Kobushi in Saitama Prefecture, and empties into Tokyo Bay. It has a total catchment area of 2,940 km^{2} (1,140 sq mi).

The Class A river is one of Tokyo's major sources of tap water, and together with the Tone River, accounts for around 80% of Tokyo's water supply as of 2018. The Okubo water purification plant takes water from the river.

== History ==
Attempts to control flooding of the Arakawa River have been made since the area that is now Tokyo became the de facto capital of Japan during the Edo period. Following a major flood in 1910 that damaged a large part of central Tokyo, a 22-kilometre (14 mi) long drainage canal was constructed between 1911 and 1924. In 1996 an agreement was signed to make it a "sister river" of the Potomac River in the eastern United States, meaning that officials and volunteers from both river areas collaborate with each other.

== In popular culture ==
This river is also depicted in many anime such as Toaru Kagaku no Railgun and Arakawa Under the Bridge, which is set on the riverbank.

The Arakawa plays a small but significant background role in the game Yakuza 4. Main character Masayoshi Tanimura spends the game trying to discover who murdered his father, Taigi, whose body was dumped in the Arakawa after he was killed.

== See also ==
- Sumida River
- Arakawa Under the Bridge, is an anime set under a bridge on the river.
