= Mount Sukai =

Old stratovolcano on the island of Honshu, Japan

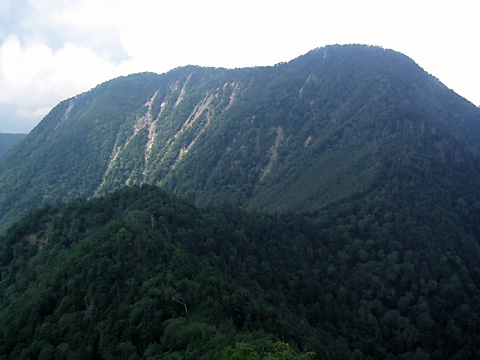
- View on Mount Sukai from Mount Nokogiri.

Highest point
- Elevation: 2,144 m (7,034 ft)
- Coordinates: 36°41′24″N 139°20′13″E

Naming
- English translation: 皇海山
- Language of name: Japanese
- Pronunciation: Japanese: [sɯ̥kaisaɴ]

Geography
- Location within Japan
- Location: Kantō region, Honshū, Japan
- Parent range: Ashio Mountains

Geology
- Mountain type: Stratovolcano
- Volcanic arc: Northeastern Japan Arc

Climbing
- Easiest route: Hike

Mount Sukai (皇海山, Sukai-san) is a stratovolcano in Japan. The 2,144-metre-high (7,034 ft) peak lies in the Ashio Mountains of Japan, on the border of Nikkō in Tochigi Prefecture and Numata in Gunma Prefecture. Mount Sukai is an old stratovolcano, but with the whole mountain covered in forest today it does not appear like a typical volcano.

== Hiking routes ==
The traditional ascent route starts at the trailhead in Ginzandaira (銀山平, Ginzandaira), Tochigi Prefecture, and leads via Mount Koshin (庚申山, Kōshin-zan) and Mount Nokogiri (鋸山, Nokogiri-yama) to the top of Mount Sukai. In addition Mount Sukai can be reached from Fudosawa (不動沢, Fudōsawa) in Gunma Prefecture.

The Nokogiri (Japanese: saw) ridge between Mount Koshin and Mount Nokogiri on the Tochigi side features eleven peaks. There is also a winding trail avoiding the eleven peak ridge and Mount Koshin. It leads south of the ridge to (六林班峠) before joining the ridge trail at Mount Nokogiri.

Religiously motivated mountain climbing in form of a three-mountain-race along Mounts Koshin, Nokogiri and Sukai was practised in the Edo period. There are ladders along the ascent to Mount Koshin and the ups and downs on Nokogiri's ridges. Many chains are present in precipitous spots. The route is not recommended for beginners.

There are onsen at the trailhead in Ginzandaira. Lodging and bathing is possible here.

Making use of private transport the summit can be climbed in relatively short time along the Fudosawa route on the Gunma side.

== Mountain huts ==
There is the unmanned Koshin retreat (庚申山荘, kōshin-sansō) near the summit of Mount Koshin.

== See also ==
- List of volcanoes in Japan
- List of mountains in Japan

== Summits in the surrounding ==
- Mount Koshin (庚申山, Kōshin-zan), Known for the butterwort Pinguicula ramosa which grows here in the wild.
- Mount Kesamaru (袈裟丸山, Kesamaru-yama)
