= Watarase River =

Coordinates: 36°09′15″N 139°41′48″E

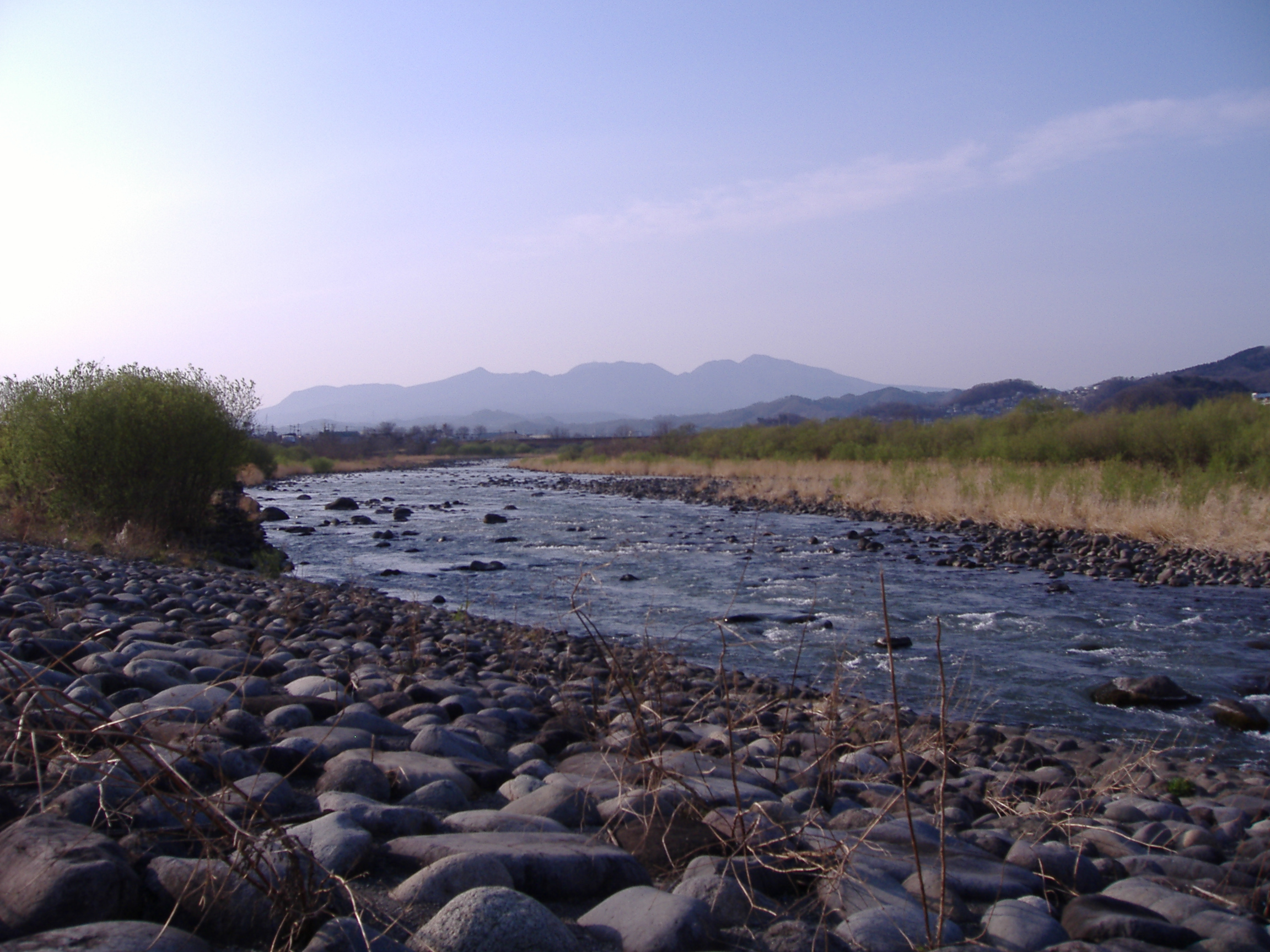
- Watarase River at Kiryu, Gunma

- Location within Japan
- Native name: 渡良瀬川 (Japanese)

Location
- Country: Japan

Physical characteristics
- Source
  - location: Mount Sukai, Nikkō, Tochigi
  - elevation: 2,144 m (7,034 ft)
- Mouth
  - location: Tone River
  - elevation: 11 m (36 ft)
- Length: 106.7 km (66.3 mi)
- Basin size: 2,621 km^{2} (1,012 sq mi)

The Watarase River (渡良瀬川, Watarase-gawa) is a major river in the northern Kantō region of Japan. A tributary of the Tone River, it is 106.7 kilometres (66.3 mi) in length and drains an area of 2,621 square kilometres (1,012 sq mi). Its source is at Mount Sukai on the boundary of the city of Nikkō in Tochigi Prefecture and it empties into the Tone River at the boundary of the city of Koga in Ibaraki Prefecture and the city of Kazo in Saitama Prefecture. It is classed as a First-class river by the Japanese government.

Although the river currently discharges into the Tone River, its original route was via the Edo River into Tokyo Bay. Its route was changed as part of the massive land reclamation and flood control works undertaken by the Tokugawa shogunate in the 17th and 18th centuries.

== See also ==
- Ashio Copper Mine
