= Tone River =

River in Kantō, Japan

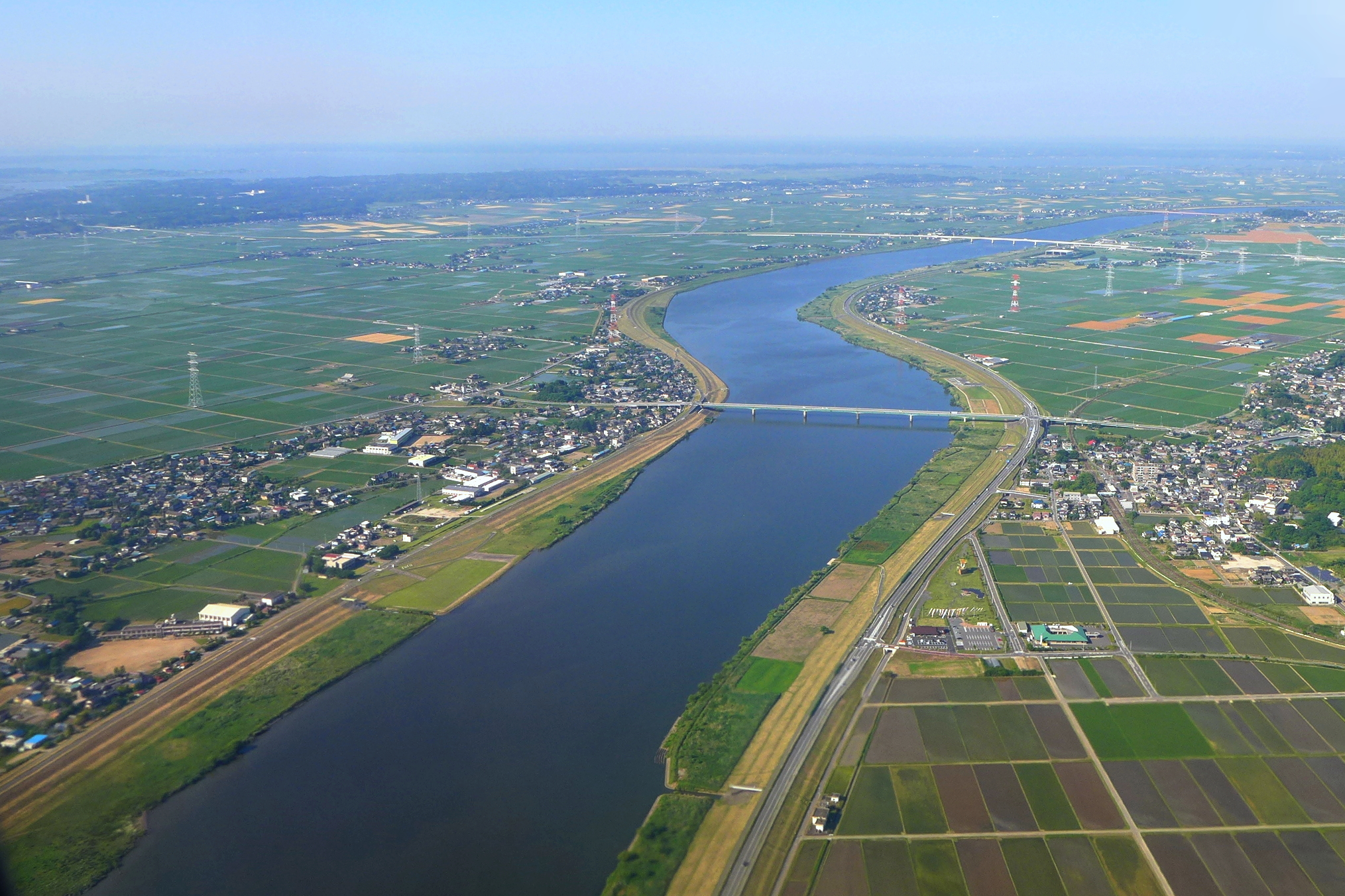
- Tone River at Narita and Kawachi (2015)

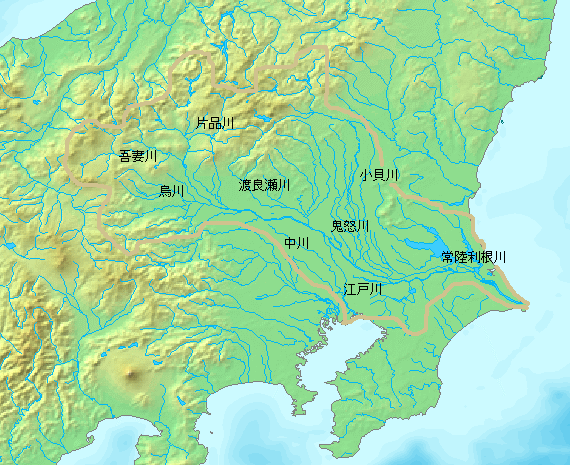

- Location within Japan
- Native name: 利根川 (Japanese)

Location
- Country: Japan

Physical characteristics
- Source: Mount Ōminakami
  - location: Minakami, Gunma
  - coordinates: 37°03′16″N 139°06′05″E
  - elevation: 1,831 m (6,007 ft)
- Mouth: Pacific Ocean
  - location: Chōshi, Chiba
  - coordinates: 35°44′45″N 140°51′07″E
  - elevation: 0 m (0 ft)
- Length: 322 km (200 mi)
- Basin size: 16,840 km^{2} (6,500 sq mi)
- Discharge
  - average: 256 m^{3}/s (9,000 cu ft/s)

The Tone River (利根川, Tone-gawa; Japanese pronunciation: [to.ne.ɡa.wa, -ŋa.wa], locally [to.neꜜ.ɡa.wa, -ŋa.wa]) is a Class A river in the Kantō region of Japan. It is 322 kilometers (200 mi) in length (the second longest in Japan after the Shinano River) and has a drainage area of 16,840 square kilometers (6,500 sq mi) (the largest in Japan). It is nicknamed Bandō Tarō (坂東太郎); Bandō is an obsolete alias of the Kantō Region, and Tarō is a popular given name for an oldest son. It is regarded as one of the "Three Greatest Rivers" of Japan, the others being the Shinano River in northeastern Honshu and the Ishikari River in Hokkaido.

== Geography ==
The source of the Tone River is at Mount Ōminakami (大水上山) (1,831 meters; 6,007 ft) in the Echigo Mountains, which straddle the border between Gunma and Niigata Prefectures in Jōshin'etsu Kōgen National Park. The Tone gathers tributaries and pours into the Pacific Ocean at Cape Inubō, Choshi in Chiba Prefecture.

=== Tributaries ===
Major tributaries of the Tone River include the Agatsuma, Watarase, Kinu, Omoi, and the Kokai River. The Edo River branches away from the river and flows into Tokyo Bay.

== History ==
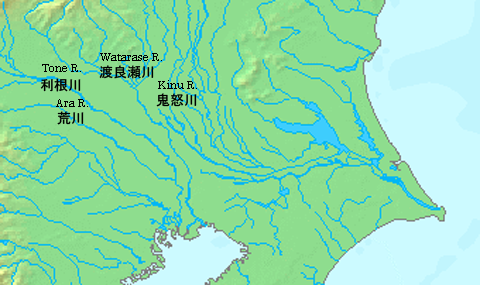
Rivers in Kantō in the 16th century

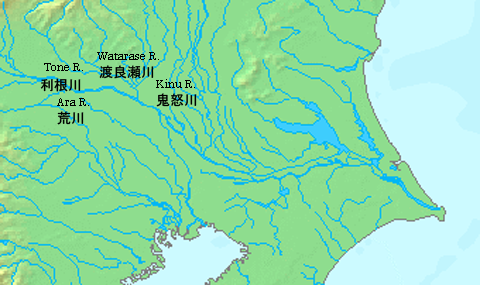
Rivers in Kantō in the 20th century

The Tone River was once known for its uncontrollable nature, and its route changed whenever floods occurred. It is hard to trace its ancient route, but it originally flowed into Tokyo Bay along the route of the present-day Edo River, and tributaries like the Watarase and Kinu had independent river systems. For the sake of water transportation and flood control, extensive construction began in the 17th century during the Tokugawa shogunate, when the Kantō region became the political center of Japan. The course of the river was significantly changed, and the present route of the river was determined during the Meiji period, with the assistance of Dutch civil engineer Anthonie Rouwenhorst Mulder. Its vast watershed is thus largely artificial.

Two ships of the Imperial Japanese Navy were named after the river, one of World War I vintage and another from World War II, the lead ship of its class. A third modern ship currently in service with the Japan Maritime Self-Defense Force is also named after the river.

=== Fukushima Daiichi nuclear disaster ===
As a result of the Fukushima Daiichi nuclear disaster radioactive cesium concentrations of 110 becquerels per kilogram were found in silver crucian carp fish caught in the Tone River in April 2012. The river is 180 kilometres (110 mi) from the Fukushima Daiichi Plant. Six fishery cooperatives and 10 towns along the river were asked to stop all shipments of fish caught in the Tone.

== Use ==
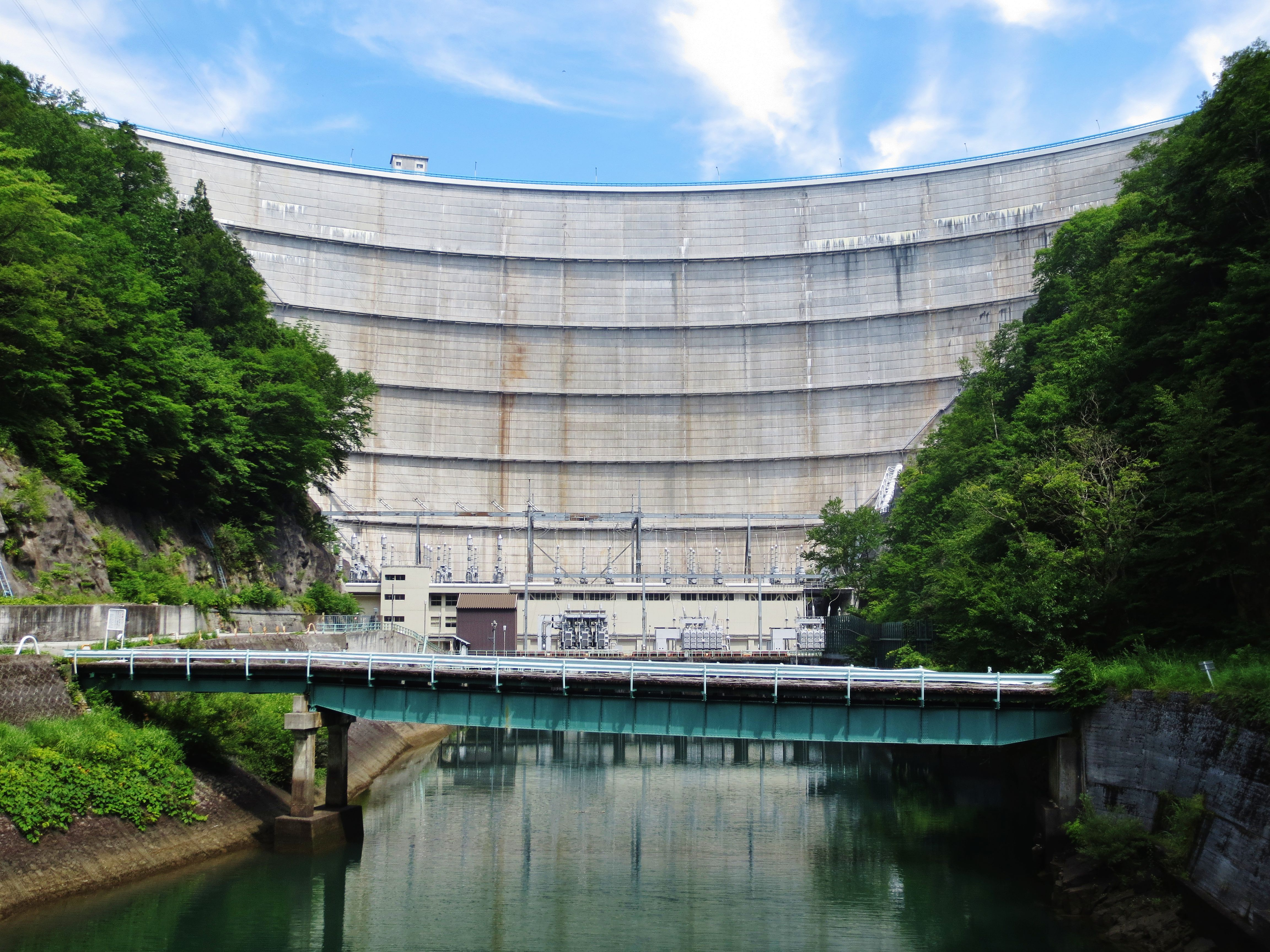
Yagisawa Dam, the biggest reservoir

The Tone River was an indispensable inland water link between the capitol at Edo, and later Tokyo, to the Pacific Ocean. It carried not only local products like soy sauce from Choshi, but also products from the Tōhoku region, in order to save time and to avoid risk in the open sea. With the advent of the railway in the 19th century major shipping on the Tone quickly declined, and inland ports such as Noda, Sekiyado, now part of Noda, Nagareyama, and Sawara, now part of Katori diminished in importance. Today the river has several dams that supply water for more than 30 million inhabitants of metropolitan Tokyo and large-scale industrial areas such as the Keiyō Industrial Zone.

=== Rafting and kayaking ===
The Minakami onsen area in Gunma Prefecture is near the source for the Tone River and during the spring snow melt period, April–June, the river provides consistent grade 4 rapids (on the International Scale of River Difficulty) over a 12 kilometers (7.5 mi) stretch. The river provides some of the best white water rafting and kayaking in Japan. The snow melt swells the river to grade 4 in spring; in the summer it is a gentle grade 2. The Momijikyo section has 7 grade 3-4 rapids for 1 kilometer (0.62 mi) and is 12 kilometers (7.5 mi) long in total.

=== Cycling ===
The Tone River is home to Japan's longest car free cycling path. At over 220 km (140 mi) long the Tone River Cycling Road 利根川サイクリングロード starts in Shibukawa City, Gunma and runs all the way to Choshi City, Chiba. The total route is over 230 km (140 mi) but the final 10 km (6.2 mi) or so into Choshi is on a road. The remaining 220 km (140 mi) is on detached cycling paths high up on the river bank with views of mountains while in Gunma and large rice fields and agriculture closer to the ocean.

== Image gallery ==
Tone River and Gunma Prefectural Government Building (October 2026)

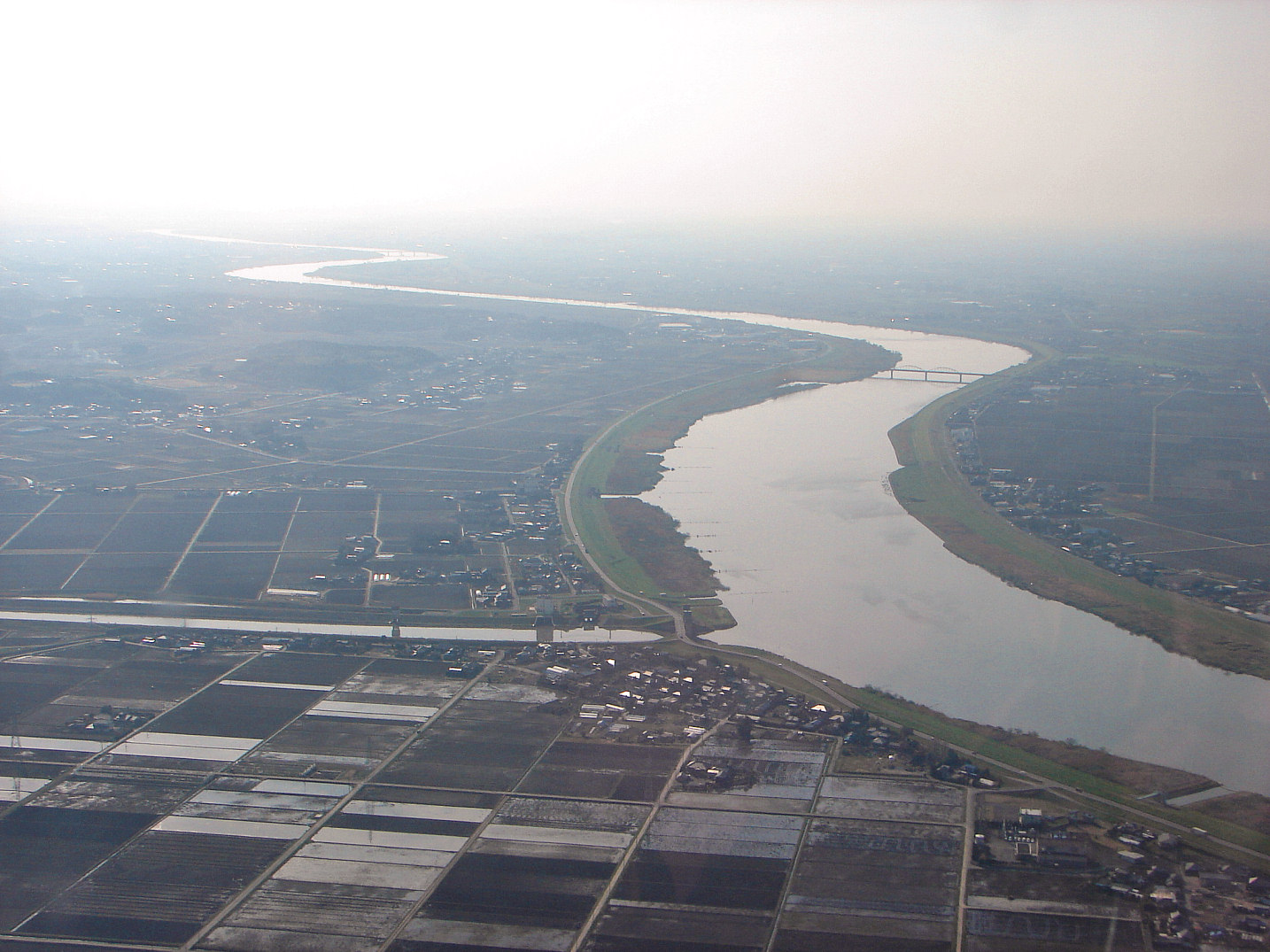
Tone River at Narita and Kawachi

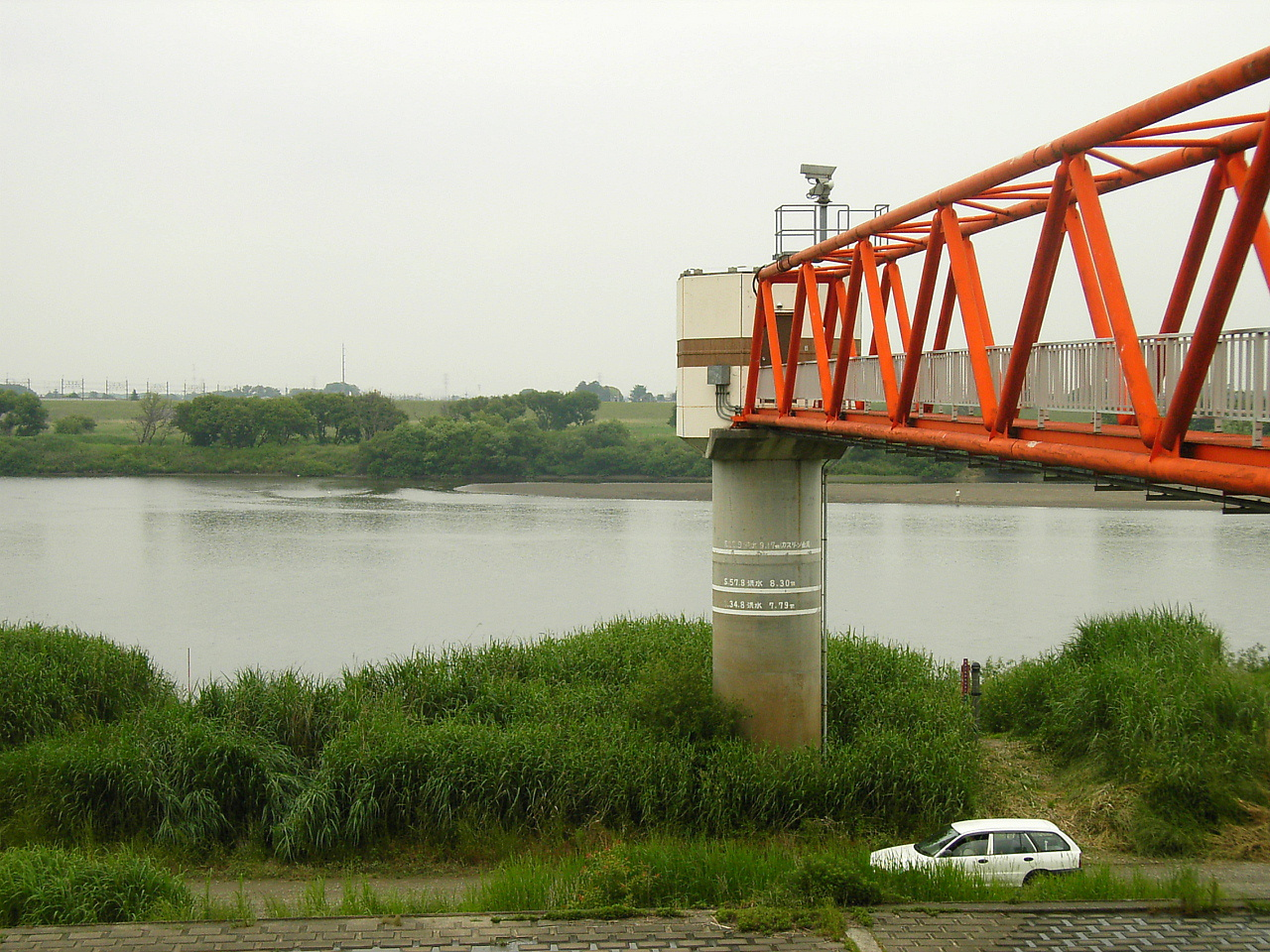
Kurihashi Water Level Observatory (June 2005)

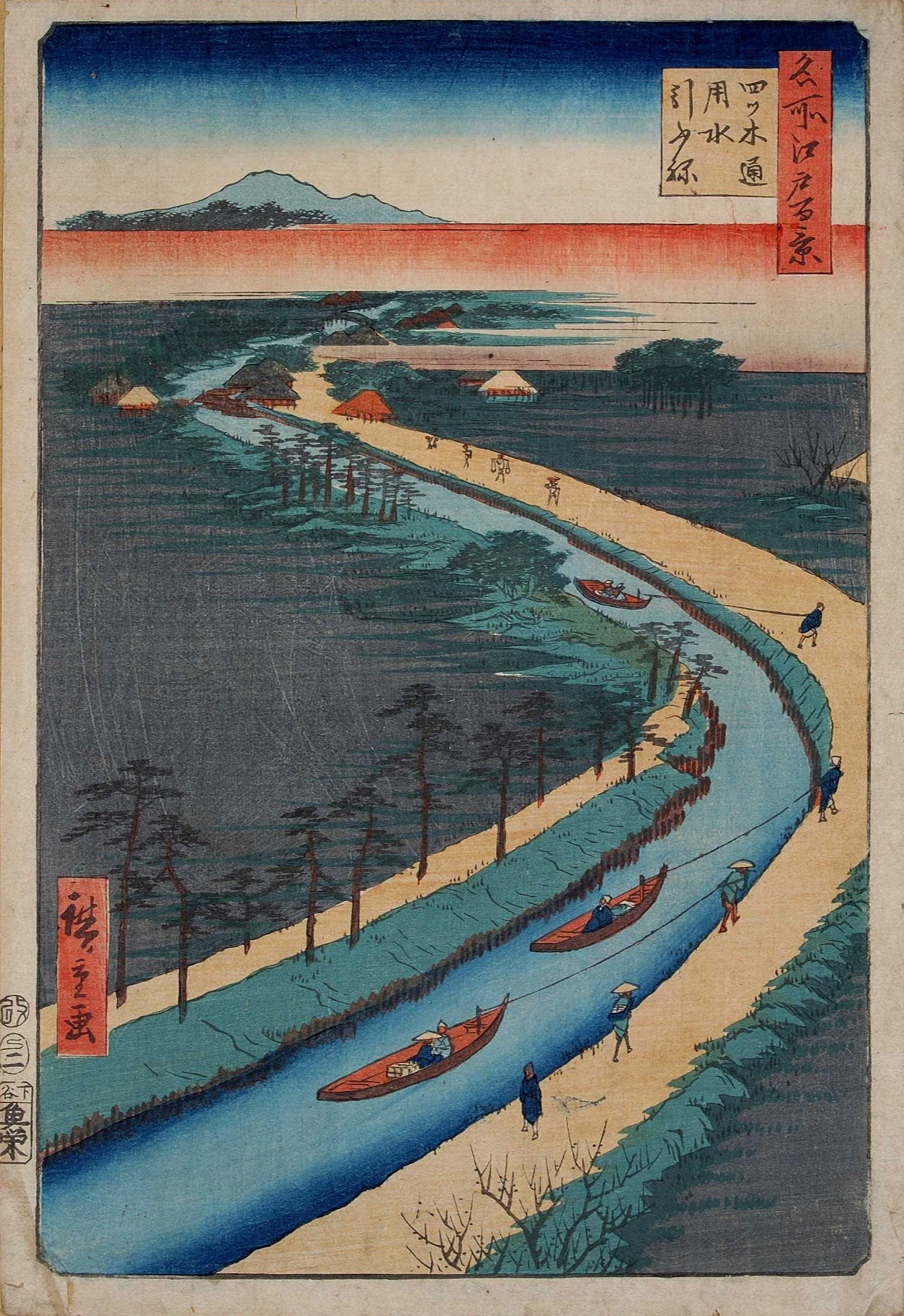
One of Tone canals, shown in Hiroshige's Ukiyo-e

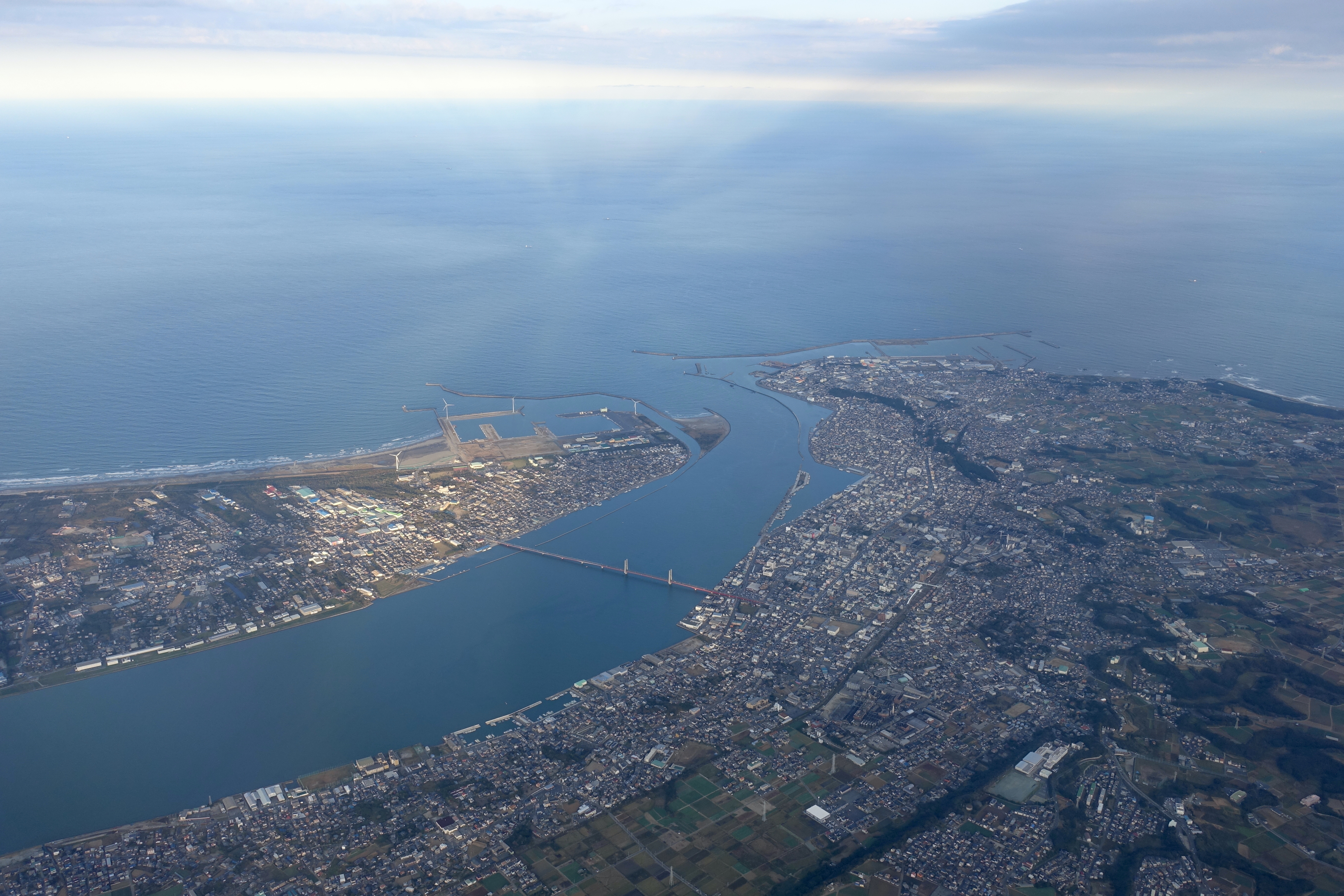
View of Tone River mouth and Chōshi city from air
