= Chiba 10th district =

Electoral constituency in Chiba Prefecture, Japan

- Parliamentary constituency for the Japanese House of Representatives
- Numbered map of the Chiba Prefecture single seats
- Prefecture: Chiba
- Proportional District: Southern Kanto
- Electorate: 322,653

Current constituency
- Created: 1994
- Seats: One
- Party: LDP
- Representatives: Masaaki Koike
- Municipalities: Cities of Asahi, Chōshi, Katori, Narita, and Sōsa. Districts of Katori.

Chiba 10th district (千葉県第10区, Chiba-ken dai-jukku or simply 千葉10区, Chiba-jukku) is a single-member constituency of the House of Representatives in the national Diet of Japan located in Chiba Prefecture.

== Areas covered ==
=== Since 2022 ===
- Asahi
- Chōshi
- Katori
- Narita
- Sōsa
- Katori District

=== 2013 - 2022 ===
- Asahi
- Chōshi
- Katori
- Narita
- Sōsa
- Katori District
- Part of Sanbu District
  - Part of Yokoshibahikari (Former Hikari area)

=== 1994 - 2013 ===
- Asahi
- Chōshi
- Sawara
- Narita
- Yōkaichiba
- Kaijō District
- Sōsa District

== List of representatives ==
Election	Representative	Party	Notes
1996	Motoo Hayashi	LDP	
2000	Motoo Hayashi	LDP	
2003	Motoo Hayashi	LDP	
2005	Motoo Hayashi	LDP	
2009	Hajime Yatagawa	Democratic	
2012	Motoo Hayashi	LDP	
2014	Motoo Hayashi	LDP	
2017	Motoo Hayashi	LDP	
2021	Motoo Hayashi	LDP	
2024	Masaaki Koike	LDP	
2026	Masaaki Koike	LDP	

== Election results ==
=== 2026 ===
2026
Party	Candidate	Votes	%	±%
LDP	Masaaki Koike	95,358	61.1	▲17.3
Centrist Reform	Hajime Yatagawa	50,956	32.6	▼10.1
JCP	Rie Tamura	9,801	6.3	▲1.2
Registered electors		316,362		
Turnout			50.83	▲0.05
LDP hold				

=== 2024 ===
2024
Party	Candidate	Votes	%	±%
LDP	Masaaki Koike	69,563	43.79	▼3.50
CDP	Hajime Yatagawa (Won PR seat)	67,920	42.76	▼2.92
Sanseitō	Ryota Shiina	11,494	7.24	New
JCP	Yukiko Naka	8,018	5.05	N/A
Independent	Naoto Imadome	1,852	1.16	▼0.07
Majority		1,643	1.03	
Registered electors		321,502		
Turnout			50.78	▼2.50
LDP hold				

=== 2021 ===
2021
Party	Candidate	Votes	%	±%
LDP	Motoo Hayashi (Incumbent)	83,822	47.29	▼5.83
CDP	Hajime Yatagawa (Won PR seat)	80,971	45.68	New
New Party Kunimori	Mari Azusa	10,272	5.80	New
Independent	Naoto Imadome	2,173	1.23	New
Majority		2,851	1.61	
Registered electors		341,141		
Turnout			53.28	▲5.29
LDP hold				

=== 2017 ===
2017
Party	Candidate	Votes	%	±%
LDP	Motoo Hayashi (Incumbent)	88,398	53.12	▼1.93
Kibō no Tō	Hajime Yatagawa	65,256	39.21	New
JCP	Masami Kasahara	12,758	7.67	▼0.23
Majority		23,142	13.91	
Registered electors		356,116		
Turnout			47.99	▼3.68
LDP hold				

=== 2014 ===
2014
Party	Candidate	Votes	%	±%
LDP	Motoo Hayashi (Incumbent)	97,783	55.05	▼2.05
Democratic	Hajime Yatagawa	65,809	37.05	▲4.55
JCP	Masami Kasahara	14,049	7.90	▲1.56
Majority		31,974	18.00	
Registered electors		356,470		
Turnout			51.67	▼4.26
LDP hold				

=== 2012 ===
2012
Party	Candidate	Votes	%	±%
LDP	Motoo Hayashi	110,139	57.10	▲10.15
Democratic	Hajime Yatagawa (Incumbent)	62,690	32.50	▼19.17
JCP	Masami Kasahara	12,230	6.34	N/A
Atarimae Party	Keiko Arita	7,831	4.06	New
Majority		47,449	24.60	
Registered electors		360,459		
Turnout			55.93	▼8.09
LDP gain from Democratic				

=== 2009 ===
2009
Party	Candidate	Votes	%	±%
Democratic	Hajime Yatagawa	118,564	51.67	▲12.52
LDP	Motoo Hayashi (Incumbent) (Won PR seat)	107,745	46.95	▼9.32
Happiness Realization	Takao Kanai	3,158	1.38	New
Majority		10,819	4.72	
Registered electors		365,443		
Turnout			64.02	▲0.70
Democratic gain from LDP				

=== 2005 ===
2005
Party	Candidate	Votes	%	±%
LDP	Motoo Hayashi (Incumbent)	128,174	56.27	▲12.70
Democratic	Hajime Yatagawa	89,183	39.15	▲24.53
JCP	Kōki Sakamoto	10,414	4.58	▲1.09
Majority		38,991	17.12	
Registered electors		367,402		
Turnout			63.32	▲2.49
LDP hold				

=== 2003 ===
2003
Party	Candidate	Votes	%	±%
LDP	Motoo Hayashi (Incumbent)	94,946	43.57	▼20.32
Independent	Hajime Yatagawa	81,950	37.61	New
Democratic	Ken Nakazawa	31,864	14.62	▼4.63
JCP	Kōki Sakamoto	7,595	3.49	▼9.33
Independent	Hiroshi Kase	1,539	0.71	New
Majority		12,996	5.96	
Registered electors		367,073		
Turnout			60.83	▲3.84
LDP hold				

=== 2000 ===
2000
Party	Candidate	Votes	%	±%
LDP	Motoo Hayashi (Incumbent)	126,837	63.89	▲0.02
Democratic	Hiroshi Kuroyanagi	38,207	19.25	New
JCP	Noriko Takada	25,446	12.82	▲3.17
Independent	Akio Hayashi	8,038	4.04	New
Majority		88,630	44.64	
Registered electors		364,381		
Turnout			56.99	
LDP hold				

=== 1996 ===
1996
Party	Candidate	Votes	%	±%
LDP	Motoo Hayashi	114,010	63.87	New
New Frontier	Hiroshi Sudo	44,408	24.88	New
JCP	Susumu Ichikawa	17,234	9.65	New
Liberal League	Yasuyuki Kawamura	2,854	1.60	New
Majority		69,602	38.99	
Registered electors				
Turnout				
LDP win (new seat)				
