= Kujūkuri Prefectural Natural Park =

Natural park of Chiba prefecture, Japan

- 県立九十九里自然公園
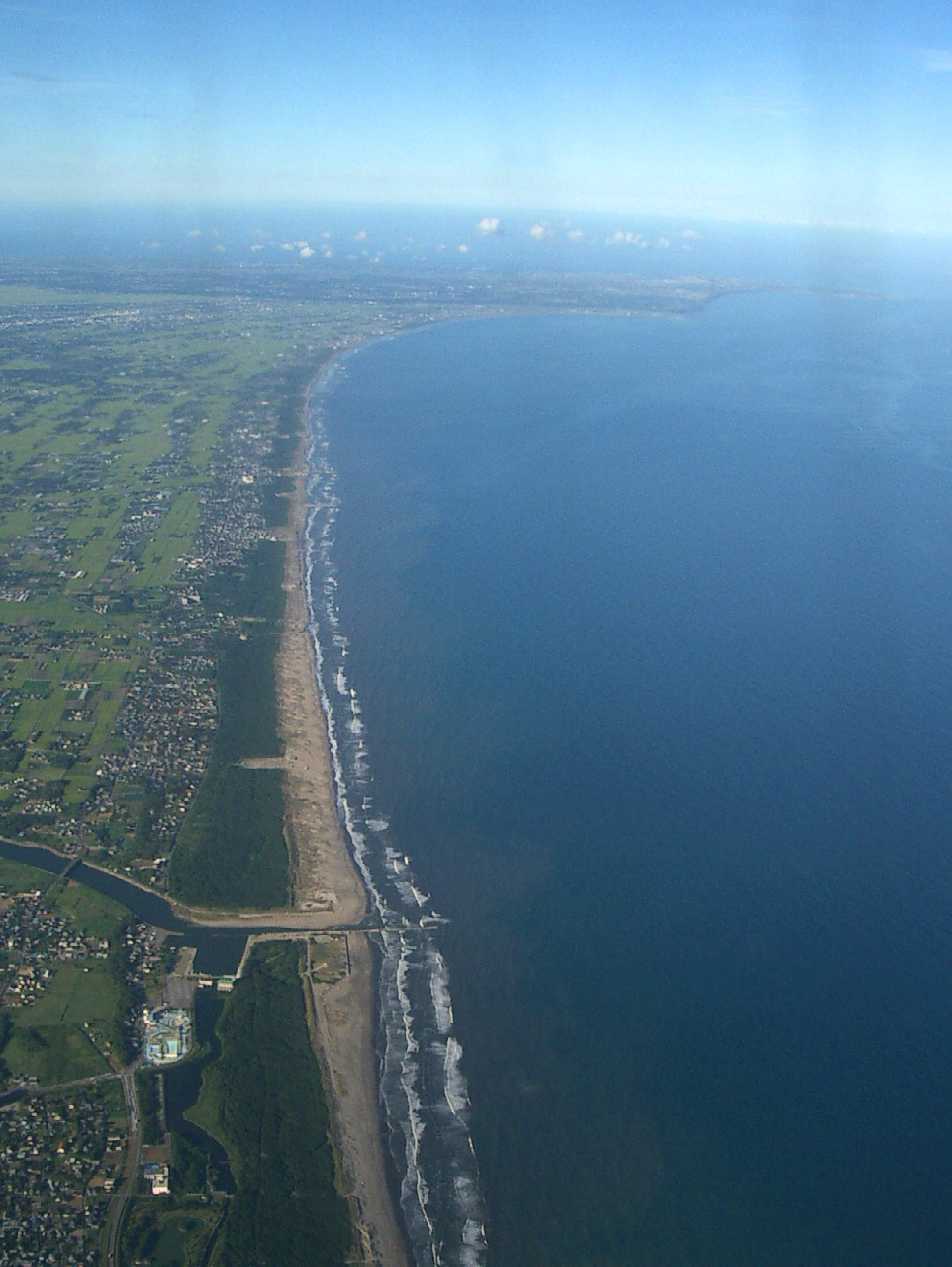
- Kujyūkuri-Beach
- Interactive map of Kujūkuri Prefectural Natural Park
- Location: Chiba Prefecture, Japan
- Coordinates: 35°30′27″N 140°26′09″E
- Area: 32.53 km^{2} (12.56 sq mi)
- Established: 9 August 1935

Kujūkuri Prefectural Natural Park (県立九十九里自然公園, Kenritsu Kujūkuri shizen kōen) is a Prefectural Natural Park in Chiba Prefecture, Japan. First designated for protection in 1935, the park extends along some sixty kilometres of the coast between the Minami Bōsō and Suigo-Tsukuba Quasi-National Parks. The park spans the borders of twelve municipalities: Asahi, Chiba, Chōsei, Chōshi, Ichinomiya, Kujūkuri, Ōamishirasato, Sanmu, Shirako, Sōsa, Tōgane, and Yokoshibahikari.

== See also ==
- National Parks of Japan
- Kujūkuri Beach
