= Masaaki Koike (politician) =

Japanese politician

- 小池 正昭
- Official portrait, 2026

Member of the House of Representatives
- Incumbent
- Assumed office 28 October 2024
- Preceded by: Motoo Hayashi
- Constituency: Chiba 10th

Member of the Chiba Prefectural Assembly
- In office 2012–2024
- Constituency: Narita City

Member of the Narita City Council
- In office 1995–2011

Personal details
- Born: 18 September 1966 (age 60) Narita, Chiba, Japan
- Party: Liberal Democratic
- Education: Nihon University
- Website: Masaaki Koike website

Masaaki Koike (小池 正昭, Koike Masaaki; born 18 September 1966) is a Japanese politician of the Liberal Democratic Party, who serves as a member of the House of Representatives.

== Early years ==
On 18 September 1966, Koike was born in Narita, Chiba Prefecture. He graduated from the College of Science and Technology at Nihon University and completed his master's degree at its Graduate School of Science and Technology.

== Political career ==
In 1995, Koike ran for the Narita City Council and won. He had served the office until 2011.

In 2011, he ran for the Chiba Prefectural Assembly and was elected.

On 4 October 2024, the LDP Chiba Prefectural Confederation appointed Koike as the head of the Chiba 10th district branch (i.e., the LDP candidate for Chiba 10th district), replacing Motoo Hayashi, who had announced his retirement. In the 2024 general election, Fukuhara defeated CDP's Hajime Yatagawa by a narrow margin and was elected for the first time.

In the 2026 general election, he defeated CRA's Yatagawa by a wide margin.
