= Saika Kawakita =

Japanese adult actress and singer (born 1999)

- 河北 彩花
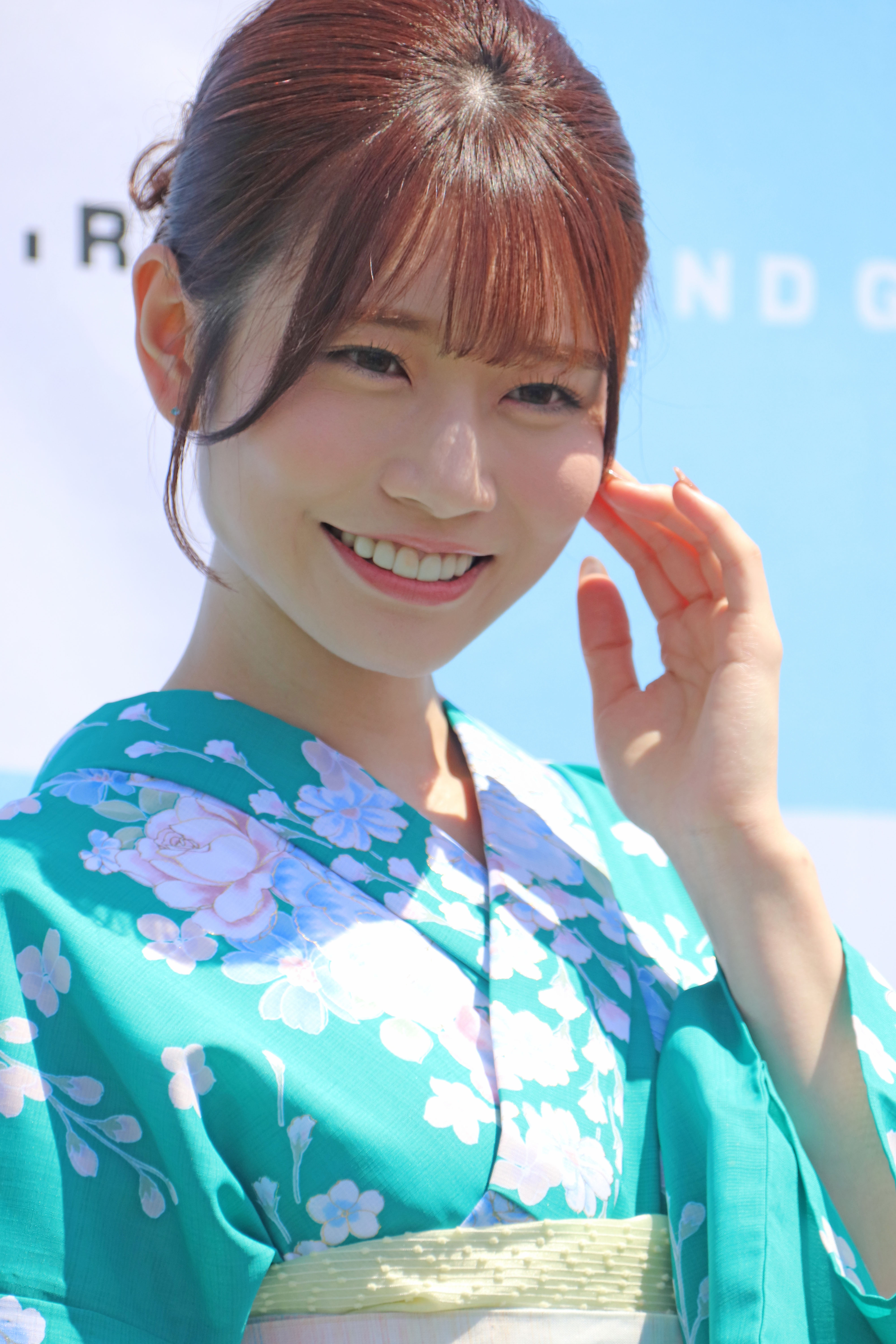
- Kawakita in 2025
- Born: 24 April 1999 (age 27); Sōsa, Chiba Prefecture, Japan
- Other names: Saika Kawakita (河北 彩伽); Moena (萌名)
- Occupations: Pornographic actress; singer
- Years active: 2018–2019; 2021–present
- Employer: S1 No. 1 Style

Signature
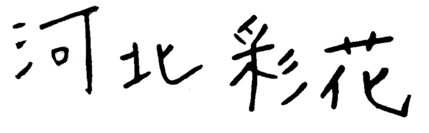

Saika Kawakita (Japanese: 河北 彩花, born 24 April 1999 (Note: Some sources mentioned she was born in 15 April 1997)) is a Japanese AV actress and singer. She made her debut in 2018, and temporarily retired in March 2019. She later resumed her career in July 2021 and has been active since.

== Career ==
Kawakita debuted in April 2018 with Shinjin No. 1 Style Kawakita Saika AV Debut (新人NO.1STYLE 河北彩花AVデビュー), produced by S1. She was successful in the AV world upon her debut. Her works ranked first and fourth in FANZA's 2018 film rankings. Shinjin won the Best Work award in the streaming and rental category at the 2019 FANZA Adult Awards.

After five months and six films, Kawakita disappeared from the AV world. During the hiatus, S1 released some unreleased scenes in a compilation. Hong Kong newspaper Oriental Daily News listed Kawakita as one of the models readers would most like to come out of retirement. In a later interview, Kawakita explained that she left because her friends found out about her AV career.

In 2021, Kawakita announced her return on the magazine FANZA and released her return film, Kawakita Saika Re:Start, on July 14. She has been active ever since, and has quickly risen to become one of the most popular JAV idols of the year.

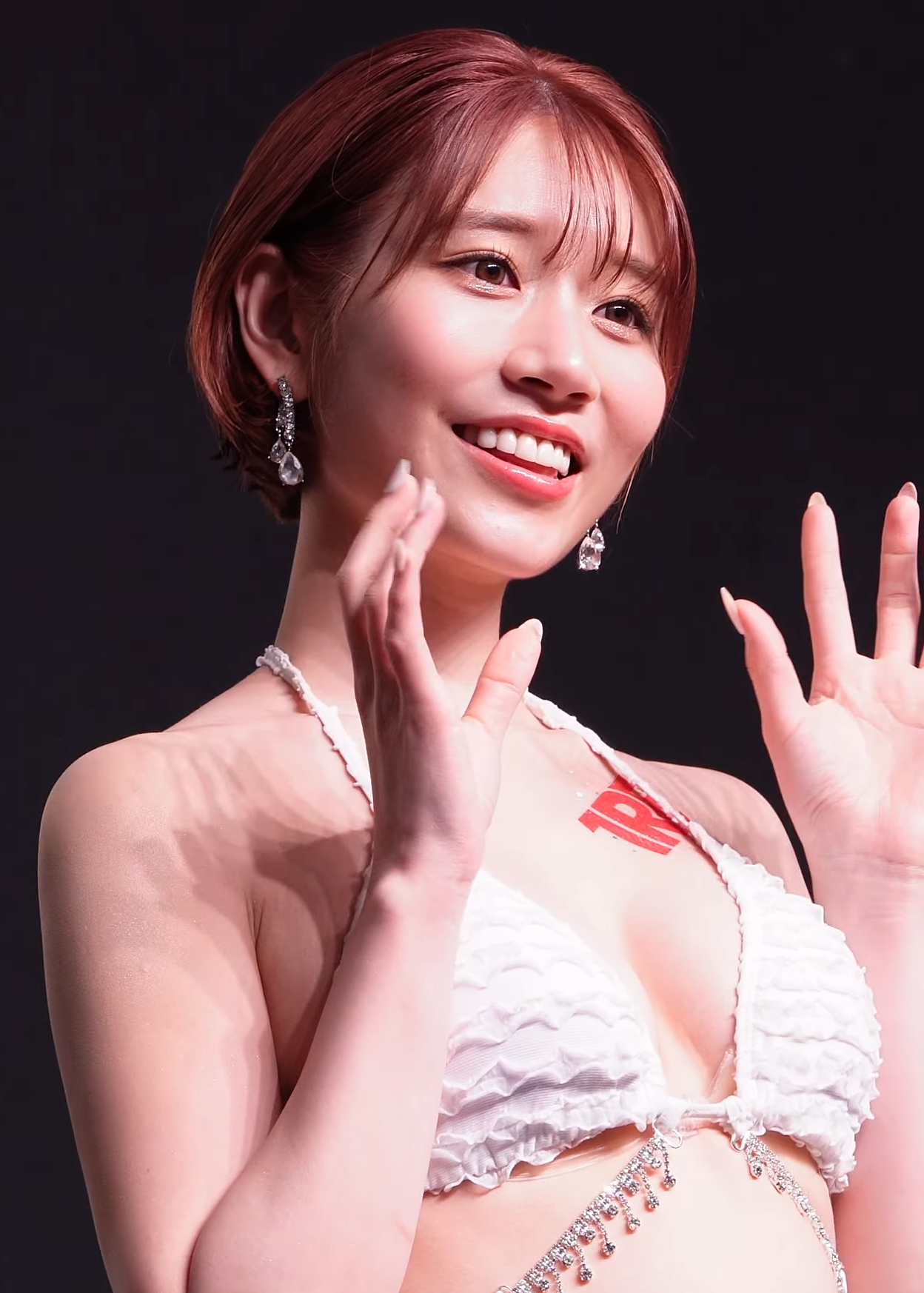
Kawakita during an event in Taipei, Taiwan

In 2024, a scene from the 2022 image video OAE-214 ALL NUDE Saika Kawakita depicting Kawakita smiling into the camera became a popular Internet meme, particularly on Twitter.

On March 6, 2024, she announced via her Twitter account that she had changed the kanji of her stage name from Ayaka Kawaita (河北 彩花) to Saika Kawakita (河北 彩伽) while keeping the same reading, and transferred her agency affiliation from CRUSE to Mine's.

In 2025, under the name Moena (萌名), she made her debut as a singer with the release of Zutto Issho ni ("Always Together").

On 6 February 2026, she announced that she had changed her stage name back to Ayaka Kawakita (河北彩花) and transferred to T-Powers agency.
