= Nosaka =

Nosaka is a Japanese surname. Notable people with the surname include:

- Akiyuki Nosaka (1930–2015), Japanese novelist, singer, lyricist, and former member of the House of Councillors
- Keiko Nosaka (1938–2019), prominent Japanese koto player, specializing in contemporary music
- Koken Nosaka (1924–2004), Japanese politician
- Sanzō Nosaka (1892–1993), the co-founder of the Japanese Communist Party

== See also ==
- Nosaka, Chiba, town located in Sōsa District, Chiba Prefecture, Japan
