= Motoo Hayashi =

Japanese politician

- 林 幹雄
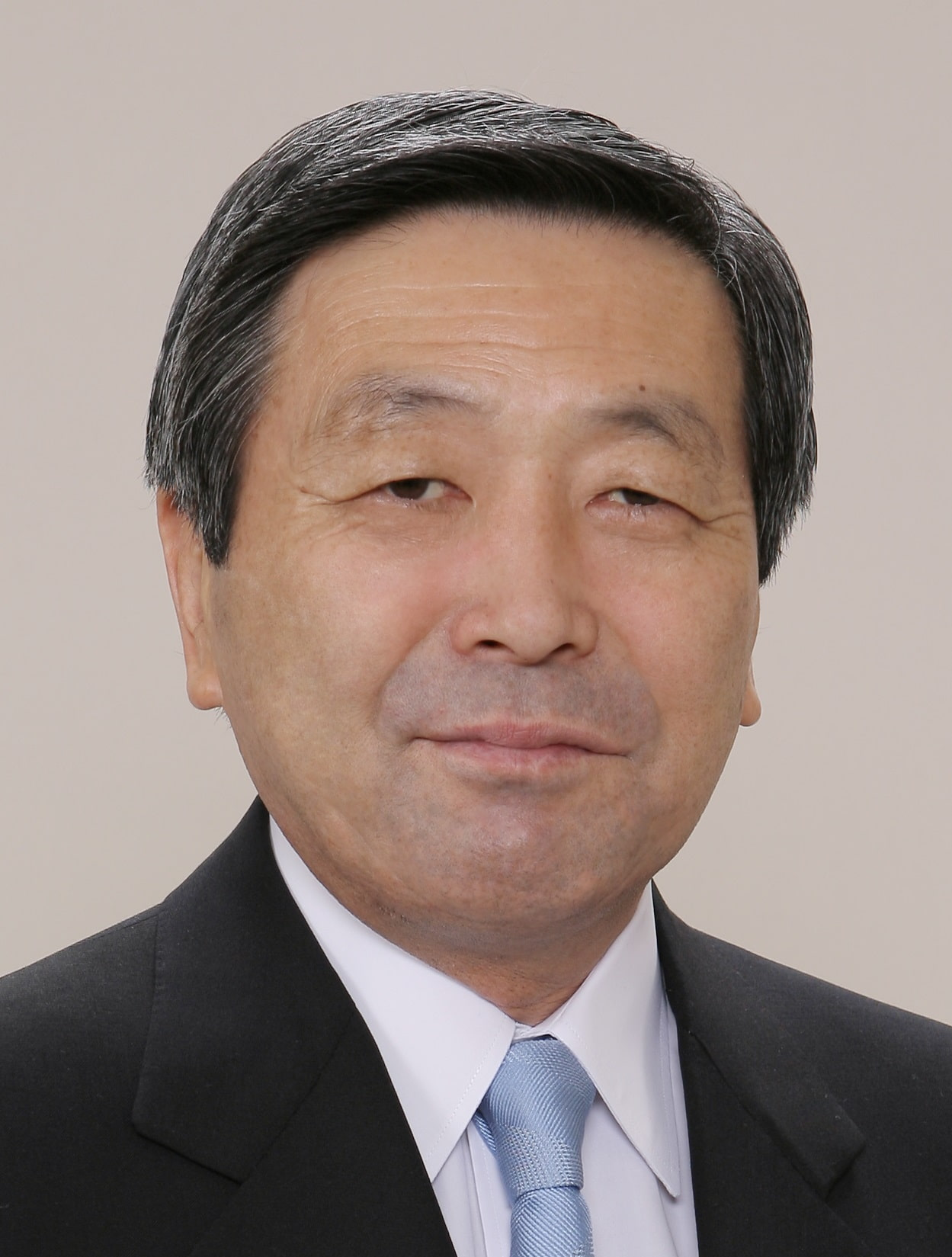
- Official portrait, 2015

Minister of Economy, Trade and Industry
- In office 7 October 2015 – 3 August 2016
- Prime Minister: Shinzo Abe
- Preceded by: Yoichi Miyazawa
- Succeeded by: Hiroshige Sekō

Chairman of the National Public Safety Commission
- In office 2 July 2009 – 16 September 2009
- Prime Minister: Tarō Asō
- Preceded by: Tsutomu Sato
- Succeeded by: Hiroshi Nakai
- In office 2 August 2008 – 24 September 2008
- Prime Minister: Yasuo Fukuda
- Preceded by: Shinya Izumi
- Succeeded by: Tsutomu Sato

Member of the House of Representatives; from Southern Kanto
- In office 18 July 1993 – 9 October 2024
- Preceded by: Taikan Hayashi
- Succeeded by: Masaaki Koike
- Constituency: Chiba 2nd (1993–1996); Chiba 10th (1996–2009); PR block (2009–2012); Chiba 10th (2012–2024)

Member of the Chiba Prefectural Assembly
- In office 1983–1993

Personal details
- Born: 3 January 1947 (age 79) Tōnoshō, Chiba, Japan
- Party: Liberal Democratic
- Parent: Taikan Hayashi (father)
- Education: Nihon University

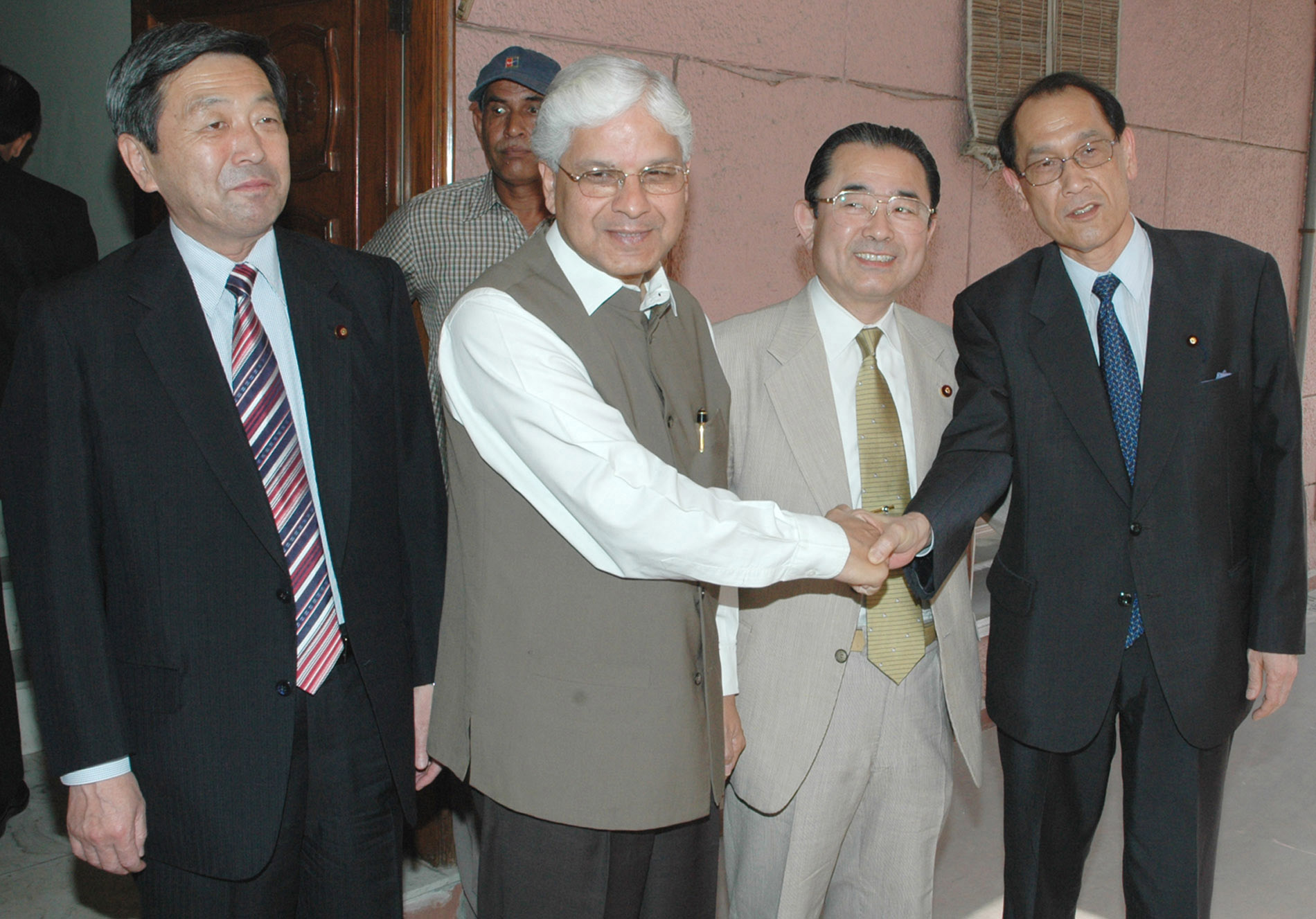
Hayashi with Ashwani Kumar and Kisaburo Tokai in 2006

Motoo Hayashi (林 幹雄, Hayashi Motoo; born 3 January 1947) is a former Japanese politician of the Liberal Democratic Party (LDP). He served as a member of the House of Representatives in the national Diet from 1993 until 2024, representing the Chiba 10th district; he has previously represented the Southern Kanto proportional representation block and the pre-1996 Chiba 2nd district.

== Career ==
A native of Katori District, Chiba, Hayashi graduated the Nihon University's College of Arts in 1970. Hayashi began his political career as a secretary to his late father, Taikan Hayashi, who served as chief of the former Environment Agency in the early 1990s.

Motoo Hayashi was elected to the assembly of Chiba Prefecture for the first time in 1983 and served for three times. He was elected to the House of Representatives for the first time in 1993. An expert on issues related to Narita International Airport, he was appointed Senior Vice-Minister of Land, Infrastructure and Transport (Koizumi Cabinet) in 2003. He has pledged to improve Japan's transport network.

On August 1, 2008 Prime Minister Yasuo Fukuda appointed him to the cabinet position of National Public Chairman, State Minister in Charge of Okinawa and Affairs Related to the Northern Territories.

Hayashi is currently serving in the Lower House representing Chiba's Tenth District and is a member of Shinzo Abe's cabinet with many responsibilities: Minister of Economy, Trade and Industry, Minister in charge of Industrial Competitiveness, Minister in charge of the Response to the Economic Impact caused by the Nuclear Accident, Minister of State for the Nuclear Damage Compensation and Decommissioning Facilitation Corporation.

Hayashi also served as Chairman of the Committee on Land, Infrastructure, Transport and Tourism of Diet, Minister of State, Chairman of National Public Safety Commission (Aso Cabinet), and Acting Chairman, Election Strategy Committee.

== Ideology ==
Hayashi is affiliated to the openly revisionist lobby Nippon Kaigi, and a member of the following right-wing Diet groups:

- Nippon Kaigi Diet discussion group (日本会議国会議員懇談会 - Nippon kaigi kokkai giin kondankai)
- Conference of parliamentarians on the Shinto Association of Spiritual Leadership (神道政治連盟国会議員懇談会 - Shinto Seiji Renmei Kokkai Giin Kondankai) - NB: SAS a.k.a. Sinseiren, Shinto Political League

Hayashi gave the following answers to the questionnaires submitted by Mainichi to parliamentarians:

- in 2012:
  - in favor of the revision of the Constitution
  - in favor of the right of collective self-defense (revision of Article 9)
  - in favor of the reform of the National assembly (unicameral instead of bicameral)
  - in favor of reactivating nuclear power plants
  - against the goal of zero nuclear power by 2030s
  - in favor of the relocation of Marine Corps Air Station Futenma (Okinawa)
  - in favor of evaluating the purchase of Senkaku Islands by the Government
  - in favor of an effort to avoid conflict with China
  - against the participation of Japan to the Trans-Pacific Partnership
  - against a nuclear-armed Japan
  - against the reform of the Imperial Household that would allow women to retain their Imperial status even after marriage
- in 2014:
  - in favor of the revision of the Article 9 of the Japanese Constitution
  - in favor of the right of collective self-defense
  - in favor of nuclear plants
  - no problem for visits of a Prime Minister to the controversial Yasukuni Shrine
  - no answer regarding the revision of the Murayama Statement
  - no answer regarding the revision of the Kono Statement
  - no answer regarding laws preventing hate speech
  - no answer regarding question whether Marine Corps Air Station Futenma is a burden for Okinawa
  - in favor of the Special Secrecy Law
  - in favor of teaching 'morality' in school

== Notes ==
Political offices
Preceded by Yoichi Miyazawa	Minister of Economy, Trade and Industry; 2015–2016	Succeeded by Hiroshige Sekō
