= Yokoshiba, Chiba =

Yokoshiba 横芝町
- Former municipality
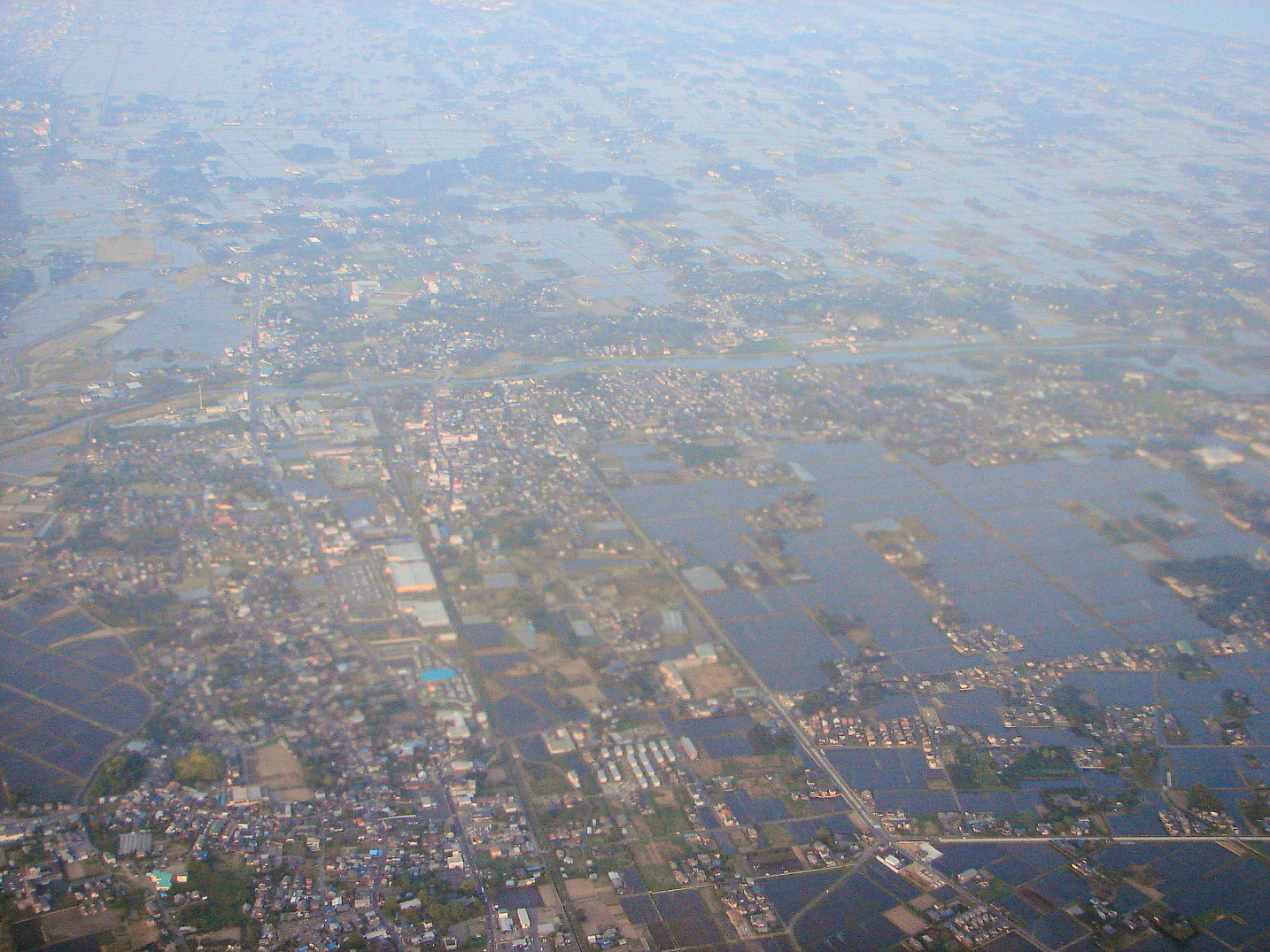
- Yokoshiba (foreground) and Miyagawa (background)

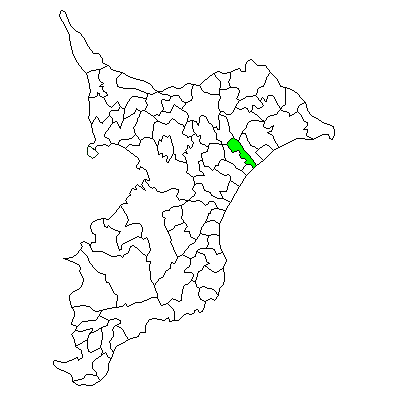
- Location of Yokoshiba in Chiba Prefecture

- Location in Japan
- Coordinates: 35°39′N 140°29′E
- Country: Japan
- Region: Kantō
- Prefecture: Chiba Prefecture
- District: Sanbu
- Merged: March 27, 2006 (now part of Yokoshibahikari)

Area
  - Total: 33.60 km^{2} (12.97 sq mi)

Population (November 1, 2005)
  - Total: 14,589
  - Density: 434/km^{2} (1,120/sq mi)
- Time zone: UTC+09:00 (JST)
- Symbols
- Tree: Prunus mume

Yokoshiba (横芝町, Yokoshiba-machi) was a town located in Sanbu District, Chiba Prefecture, Japan.

Asahi Village was established on April 1, 1889, within Musha District. It changed its name to Yokoshiba on December 28, 1892. Musha District became part of Sanbu District from April 1, 1897. On May 10, 1897, Yokoshiba was elevated to town status. It expanded through the annexation of the neighboring villages of Ōfusa and Kamisakae on July 1, 1955.

On March 27, 2006, Yokoshiba, along with the town of Hikari (from Sōsa District), was merged to create the town of Yokoshibahikari, and thus no longer exists as an independent municipality. Sōsa District was dissolved as a result of this merger.

As of November 1, 2005, (the last census data prior to the merger) the town had an estimated population of 14,589 and a population density of 434 persons per km^{2}. The total area was 33.60 km^{2}.
