= College of Science and Technology, Nihon University =

Faculty of Nihon University in Japan

- 日本大学理工学部
- Other names: CST, Nichidai Riko, Nichidai Rikōgakubu
- Former name: Nihon University Faculty of Engineering (1928–1958)
- Type: Faculty of Nihon University
- Established: 1920
- Affiliations: JABEE (Department of Transportation Systems Engineering)
- Location: Funabashi and Surugadai, Chiyoda-ku, Chiba and Tokyo, Japan
- Website: Official website

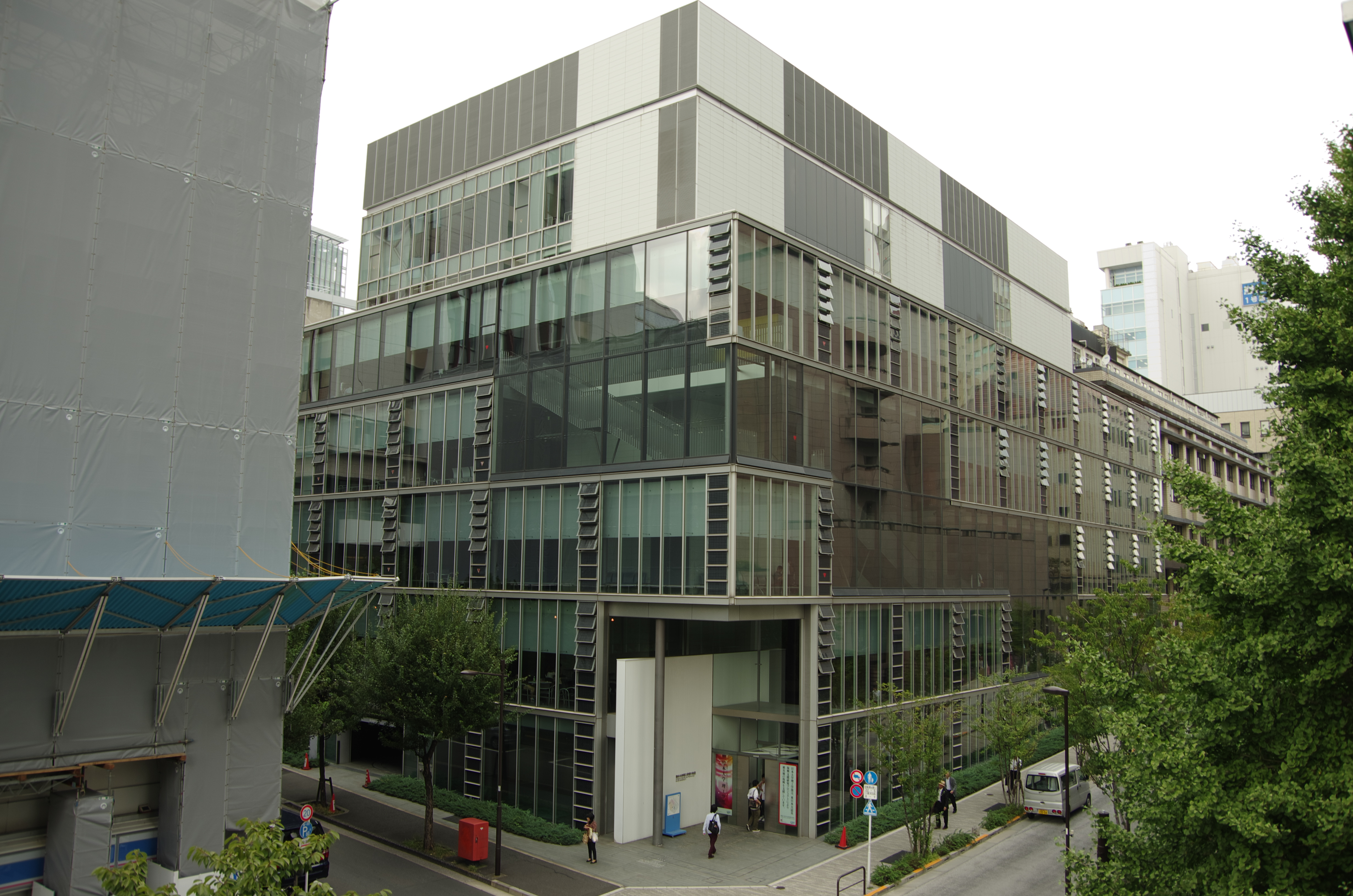
Surugadai Building No.1 (2014)

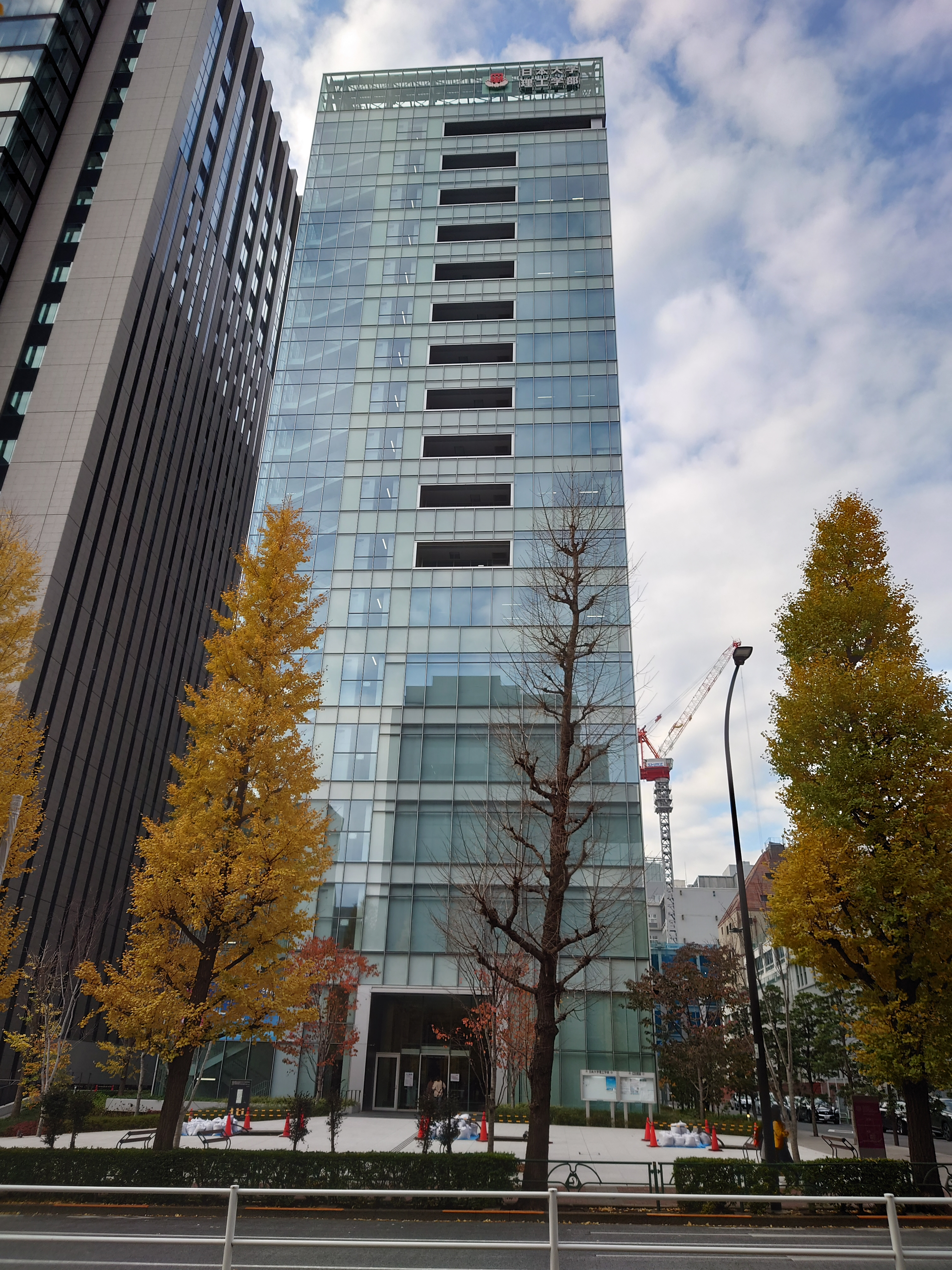
Tower Schola (December 2020)

The College of Science and Technology, Nihon University (in Japanese 日本大学理工学部, Nihon Daigaku Rikōgakubu; commonly CST) is the faculty of Nihon University devoted to education and research in science and technology. The Graduate School of Science and Technology, Nihon University (日本大学大学院理工学研究科) conducts education and research in theoretical and applied science and technology at the graduate level.

Common abbreviations include "Nichidai Riko" (日大理工), "Nichidai Rikōgakubu" (日大理工学部), and "CST".

== Overview ==
The college traces its origins to the establishment of the Nihon University Higher Technical School in 1920 and was upgraded in 1928 to the Nihon University Faculty of Engineering, the second science-and-technology university among private institutions in Japan. In 1958 it was renamed the College of Science and Technology. To date, it has produced a total of roughly 200,000 graduates. The Department of Transportation Systems Engineering is accredited by JABEE (Japan Accreditation Board for Engineering Education); graduates are exempted from the first-stage national Professional Engineer examination.

The college hosts the Research Institute of Science and Technology (RIST) and the Institute of Quantum Science, among other advanced research facilities, which are recognized both in Japan and internationally. The college actively engages in joint and commissioned research with public research agencies and industry and has produced numerous results.

Known as "Nichidai of structural engineering," (Nichidai is Nihon University) the Department of Architecture has its origins in the architecture department established at the inception of the school and has offered distinctive architectural education built up over many years.

CST currently comprises 14 departments.

First-year students in Civil Engineering, Architecture, Mechanical Engineering, Electrical Engineering, Applied Molecular Chemistry, Physics, and Mathematics study at the Funabashi Campus; from their second year onward they study at the Surugadai Campus. Students in other departments study at the Funabashi Campus for all years.

== History ==
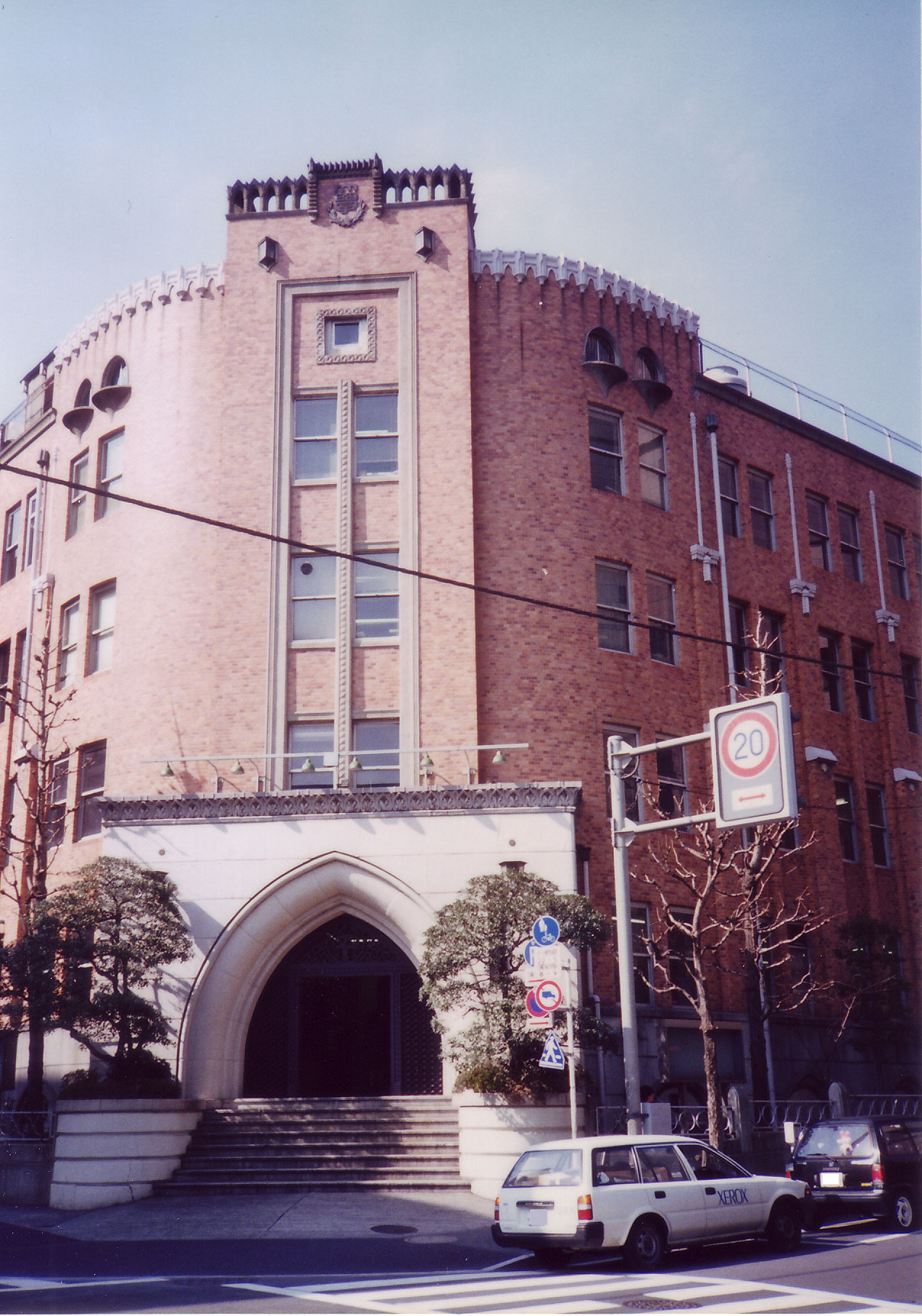
Former Surugadai Building No.1, completed in 1929 (no longer extant)

The College of Science and Technology traces its origins to the founding of the Nihon University Higher Technical School in 1920. It became the Faculty of Engineering in 1928 and was renamed the College of Science and Technology in 1958. During the postwar expansion, new departments and a graduate school were established, and the Research Institute of Science and Technology was founded in 1963.

From the 1970s through the 1990s, the college added departments such as Oceanic Architecture and Engineering, Aerospace Engineering, and Electronic Engineering, while older programs like Pharmacy branched off to form independent colleges. The Funabashi Campus opened in 1996, and the Institute of Quantum Science succeeded the earlier nuclear institute in 2002.

In the 21st century, CST expanded interdisciplinary fields such as information science, real estate science, and quantum engineering. A new Surugadai Building No.1 was completed in 2003, followed by the "Tower Schola" complex in 2018. The college celebrated its 100th anniversary in 2020.

== Notable alumni ==
=== Politicians ===
- Tomio Fujii
- Seiroku Kajiyama
- Saburō Kōmoto
- Motohiko Kondō
- Yoshihiro Suzuki
- Tomikazu Fukuda – Politician; Governor of Tochigi Prefecture; former Mayor of Utsunomiya
- Masaaki Koike

=== Business ===
- Yasuhiro Fukushima – Square Enix honorary chairman; founder of Enix
- Yūji Kudō (Sanyūtei Ahamaro) – Entrepreneur; co-founder of Hudson Soft
- Hideki Mori – President, Anodos Co., Ltd.

=== Academia and research ===
- Isao Takagi – Geography; professor emeritus, Keio University; president, Tokiwa University
- Kazuhito Watanabe – Environmental design; professor, Tama Art University

=== Technology ===
- Takayuki Ohira – Planetarium designer

=== Architecture ===
- Riken Yamamoto – Architect; professor, Yokohama National University Graduate School; Pritzker Architecture Prize; Japan Art Academy Prize

=== Culture ===
- Eiji Mikage – Novelist; light novel author
- Shinji Takahashi (withdrew) – Founder of the religious corporation GLA

=== Sports ===
- Nariyuki Masuda – Cyclist

== Research institutes and facilities ==
The College of Science and Technology maintains numerous specialized research centers and laboratories across its Surugadai and Funabashi campuses. Major facilities include the Research Institute of Science and Technology, the Advanced Materials Science Center, and the Research Center for Micro Functional Devices, which supports nanotechnology and micro-engineering studies in clean-room environments.

The Information Education and Research Center was the first in Japan to be certified as a Dassault Systèmes test center for 3D design and PLM training. Other notable facilities include the CST Science & Technology Materials Center (CST MUSEUM), Techno-Place 15—a multi-purpose experimental complex that has received both the BCS and Good Design Awards—and the Large-Scale Structures Testing Center, equipped for seismic and structural analysis.

Together, these institutes promote interdisciplinary research in fields such as advanced materials, civil engineering, fluid dynamics, and aerospace technology.

== Research and extracurricular activities ==
The College of Science and Technology is active in both academic research and student engineering projects. In 2014, its student-built nanosatellite SPROUT was successfully launched aboard an H-IIA rocket, following earlier successes such as the SEEDS CubeSat project launched in 2008.

CST students have also achieved world-class results in the Space Elevator Technology Competition, setting an unofficial altitude record of 1,200 meters in 2013, and have won multiple titles at Japan's long-running Bird-Man Rally for human-powered aircraft.

Other notable student groups include Enjin-kai, a mechanical engineering team competing in the All-Japan Student Formula and Formula SAE events, and the Nihon University Glider Club, which has won several national and regional championships.

== See also ==
- Nihon University Junior College
- Toshikazu Sano
