= Yokoshibahikari =

Yokoshibahikari 横芝光町
- Town
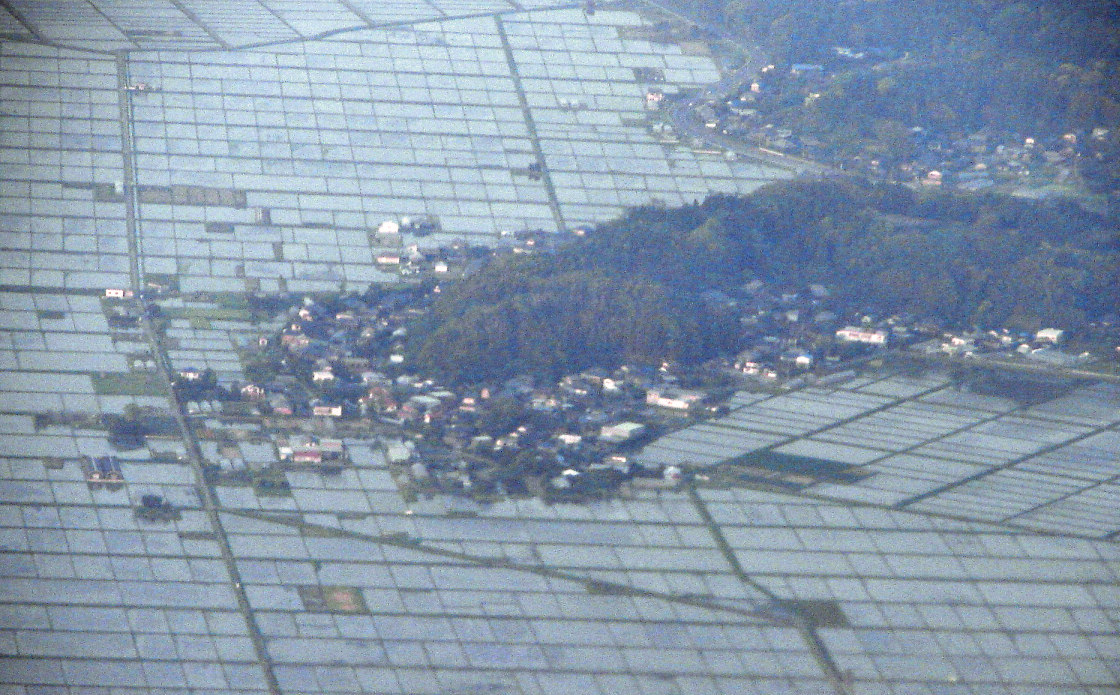
- Hamlet of Hikari, Chiba

- Flag Seal

- Location of Yokoshibahikari in Chiba Prefecture

- Location of Yokoshibahikari in Japan
- Coordinates: 35°40′N 140°30′E
- Country: Japan
- Region: Kantō
- Prefecture: Chiba
- District: Sanbu

Area
  - Total: 66.91 km^{2} (25.83 sq mi)

Population (April 2020)
  - Total: 23,467
  - Density: 350.7/km^{2} (908.4/sq mi)
- Time zone: UTC+9 (Japan Standard Time)
- Phone number: 0479-84-1211
- Address: 11902 Miyagawa, Yokoshibahikari-machi, Chiba-ken 289-1727
- Climate: Cfa
- Website: Official website
- Symbols
- Bird: Little tern
- Flower: Sakura
- Tree: Prunus mume

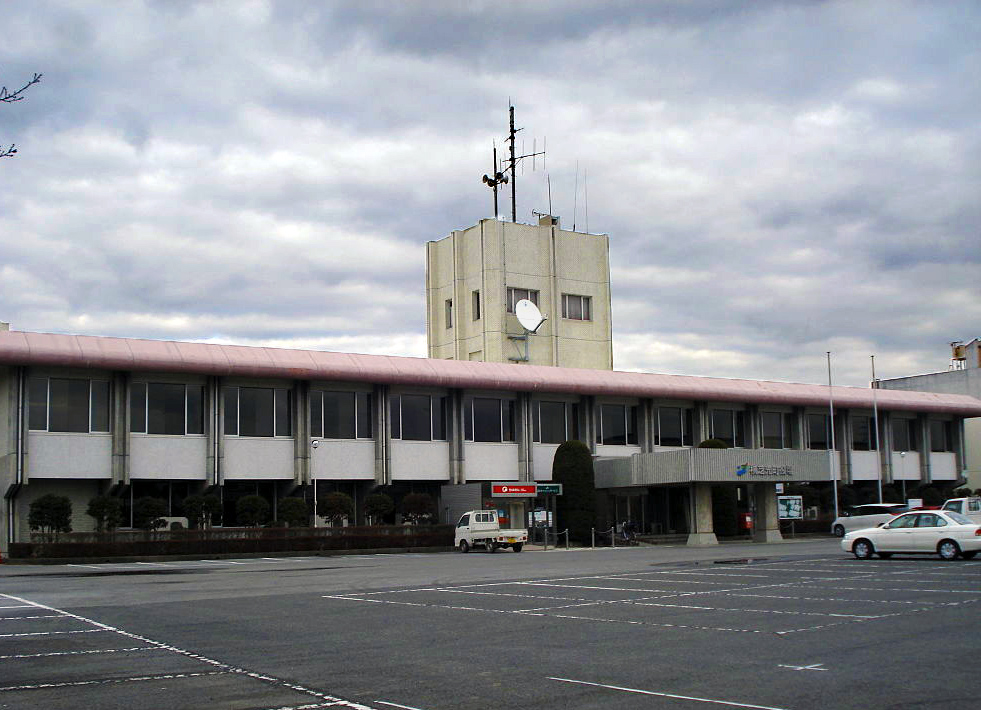
Yokoshibahikari Town Hall

Yokoshibahikari (横芝光町, Yokoshibahikari-machi) is a town located in Chiba Prefecture, Japan. As of 1 April 2020, the town had an estimated population of 23,467 in 9771 households and a population density of 350 persons per km^{2}. The total area of the town is 66.91 square kilometres (25.83 sq mi).

== Geography ==
Yokoshibahikari is located in northeastern Bōsō Peninsula, bordered by the Pacific Ocean to the east. It is about 35 kilometers from the prefectural capital at Chiba, and about 60 to 70 kilometers from the center of Tokyo. The town lacks a center, but instead consists of a collection of hamlets scattered over the countryside extending from the Yokoshiba Station on the Sōbu Main Line. Given such sparse structure, it takes quite a long time for the bus lines to serve the whole town. The coastal area of Yokoshibahikari, which makes up part of Kujūkuri Beach, is protected as part of Kujūkuri Prefectural Natural Park.

=== Surrounding municipalities ===
Chiba Prefecture

- Sanmu
- Shibayama
- Sōsa
- Tako

=== Climate ===
Yokoshibahikari has a humid subtropical climate (Köppen Cfa) characterized by warm summers and cool winters with light to no snowfall. The average annual temperature in Yokoshibahikari is 15.2 °C (59.4 °F). The average annual rainfall is 1,509.4 mm (59.43 in) with October as the wettest month. The temperatures are highest on average in August, at around 26.1 °C (79.0 °F), and lowest in January, at around 4.7 °C (40.5 °F).

Climate data for Yokoshibahikari (1991−2020 normals, extremes 1978−present)
Month	Jan	Feb	Mar	Apr	May	Jun	Jul	Aug	Sep	Oct	Nov	Dec	Year
Record high °C (°F)	21.1 (70.0)	25.3 (77.5)	25.7 (78.3)	30.3 (86.5)	32.3 (90.1)	35.5 (95.9)	37.4 (99.3)	38.1 (100.6)	36.9 (98.4)	33.5 (92.3)	26.7 (80.1)	24.3 (75.7)	38.1 (100.6)
Mean daily maximum °C (°F)	10.4 (50.7)	11.0 (51.8)	14.0 (57.2)	18.6 (65.5)	22.6 (72.7)	25.2 (77.4)	29.1 (84.4)	30.7 (87.3)	27.5 (81.5)	22.5 (72.5)	17.7 (63.9)	12.8 (55.0)	20.2 (68.3)
Daily mean °C (°F)	4.7 (40.5)	5.5 (41.9)	8.8 (47.8)	13.7 (56.7)	18.0 (64.4)	21.1 (70.0)	24.7 (76.5)	26.1 (79.0)	23.1 (73.6)	17.9 (64.2)	12.3 (54.1)	7.1 (44.8)	15.3 (59.5)
Mean daily minimum °C (°F)	−0.4 (31.3)	0.5 (32.9)	3.7 (38.7)	8.7 (47.7)	13.9 (57.0)	17.8 (64.0)	21.4 (70.5)	22.7 (72.9)	19.6 (67.3)	14.0 (57.2)	7.6 (45.7)	2.1 (35.8)	11.0 (51.8)
Record low °C (°F)	−8.0 (17.6)	−7.4 (18.7)	−4.4 (24.1)	−1.6 (29.1)	5.3 (41.5)	10.0 (50.0)	12.8 (55.0)	15.9 (60.6)	8.2 (46.8)	2.8 (37.0)	−1.5 (29.3)	−5.7 (21.7)	−8.0 (17.6)
Average precipitation mm (inches)	78.4 (3.09)	69.9 (2.75)	127.3 (5.01)	119.8 (4.72)	130.8 (5.15)	159.5 (6.28)	125.6 (4.94)	90.4 (3.56)	201.5 (7.93)	238.9 (9.41)	103.8 (4.09)	63.6 (2.50)	1,509.4 (59.43)
Average precipitation days (≥ 1.0 mm)	6.5	6.9	11.3	10.8	10.6	11.8	9.6	6.9	11.0	11.9	8.9	6.7	112.9
Mean monthly sunshine hours	188.5	168.7	166.4	180.2	182.2	132.7	165.6	205.6	143.0	132.6	145.9	167.4	1,975.8
Source: Japan Meteorological Agency

== Demographics ==
Per Japanese census data, the population of Yokoshibahikari has remained relatively steady over the past 70 years.

Historical population
Year	Pop.	±%
1920	18,838	—
1930	19,346	+2.7%
1940	19,998	+3.4%
1950	26,729	+33.7%
1960	24,884	−6.9%
1970	23,192	−6.8%
1980	25,387	+9.5%
1990	26,430	+4.1%
2000	26,721	+1.1%
2010	24,675	−7.7%
2020	22,075	−10.5%

== History ==
Yokoshibahikari spans the border between the former provinces of Kazusa and Shimōsa. The village of Asahi was established in Sanbu District with the establishment of the modern municipalities system on April 1, 1889. It changed its name to Yokoshiba on December 28, 1892, and was raised to town status on February 1, 1955. The town of Hikari in Sōsa District was created by the merger of four villages on May 3, 1954. Yokoshibahikari was formed by the merger on March 27, 2006, of the towns of Hikari and Yokoshiba. Sōsa District was dissolved as a result of this merger.

== Government ==
Yokoshibahikari has a mayor-council form of government with a directly elected mayor and a unicameral town council of 16 members. Yokoshibahikari, together with neighboring Sanmu and the municipalities of Sanmu District collectively contributes two members to the Chiba Prefectural Assembly. In terms of national politics, the town is part of Chiba 10th district of the lower house of the Diet of Japan.

== Economy ==
Agriculture has been a mainstay of the economy of Yokoshibahikari since early times. The town has a cool winter and mild summer. Other than extensive rice cultivation, the town is a center of production of negi, the Welsh onion, tomatoes, and kabocha, a Japanese variety of winter squash. Pig and dairy farms are also found in the town. The town traditionally produced ceramics. In 1991 the northern part of the town was designated as the Yokoshiba Industrial Park due to its close proximity to Narita International Airport.

== Education ==
Yokoshibahikari has seven public elementary schools and two public middle schools operated by the town government, and one public high school operated by the Chiba Prefectural Board of Education.

== Transportation ==
=== Railway ===
JR East – Sōbu Main Line

- Yokoshiba

=== Highway ===
- Ken-Ō Expressway
- National Route 126

== Noted people from Sodegaura ==
- Konishiki Yasokichi I, Sumo wrestler

== Local attractions ==
- Kujūkuri Beach
- Shibayama Kofun cluster, a National Historic Site

== Gallery ==
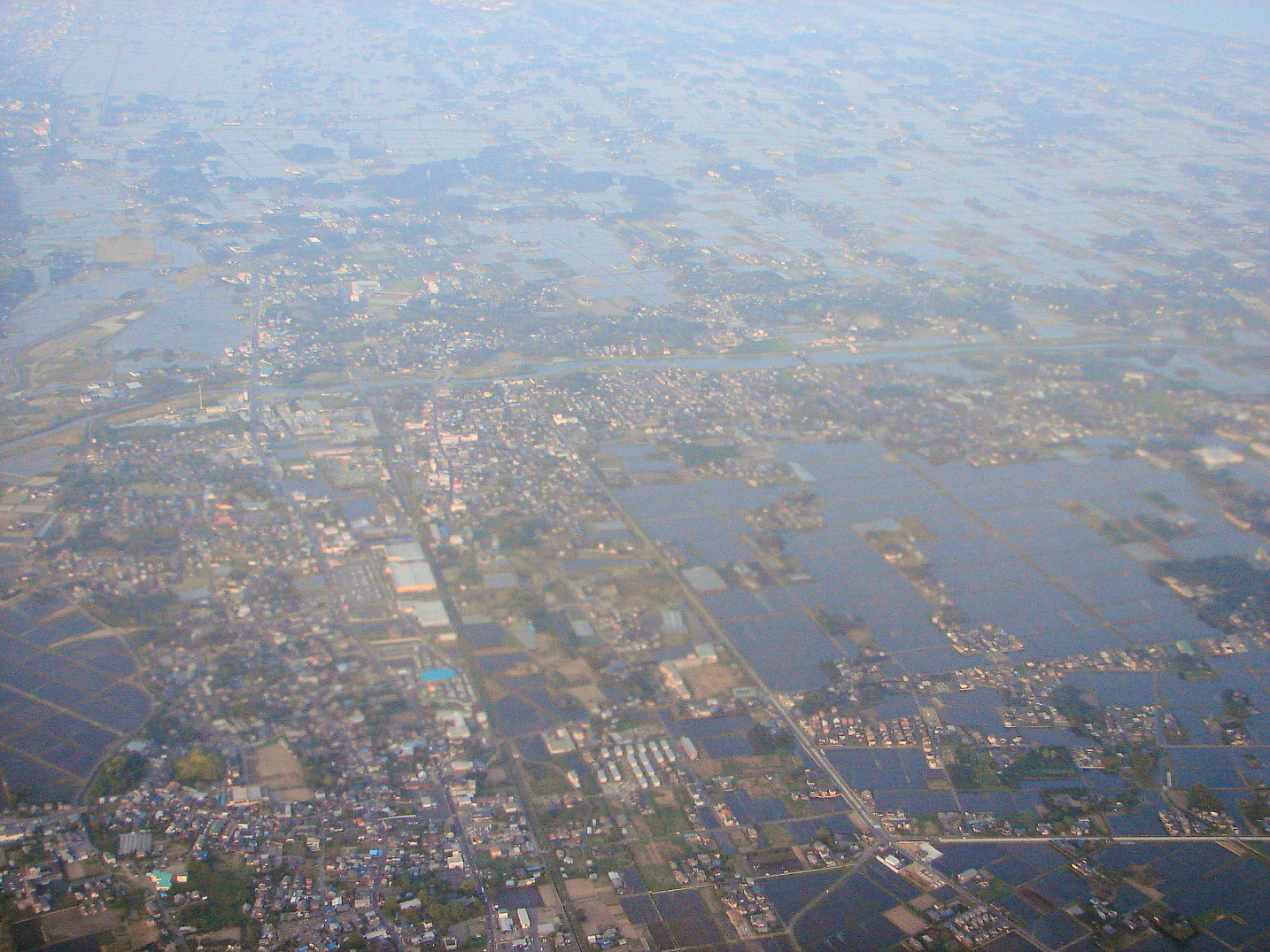
Yokoshiba (foreground) and Miyagawa (background)

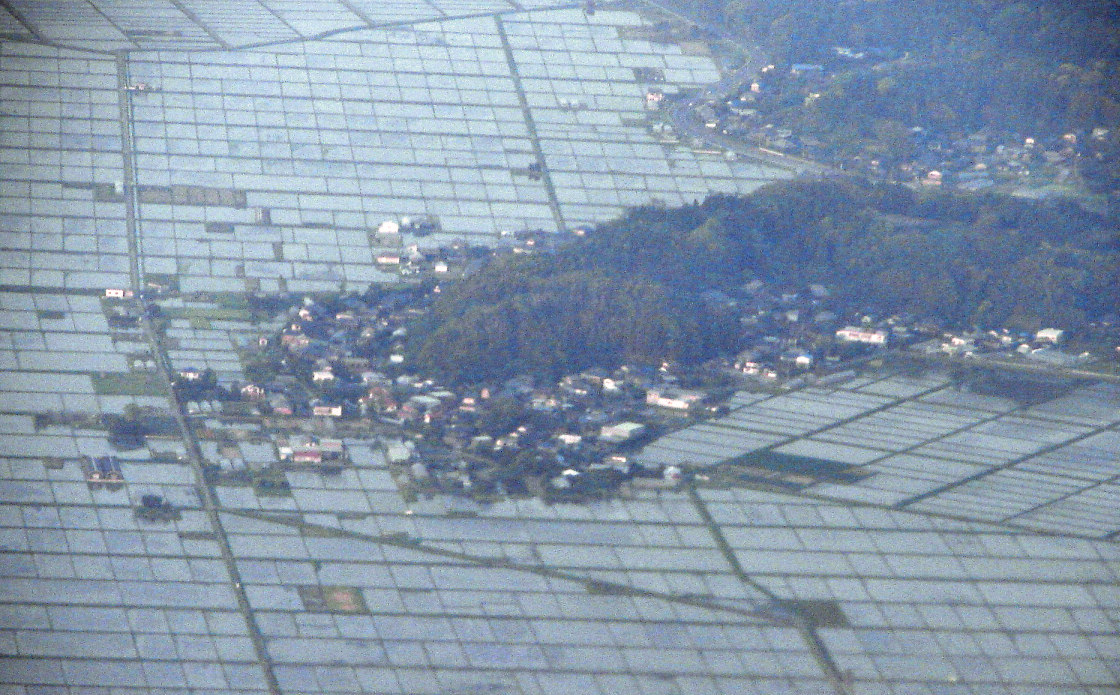
Hikari (near Arai)
