= Sōsa =

Sōsa 匝瑳市
- City
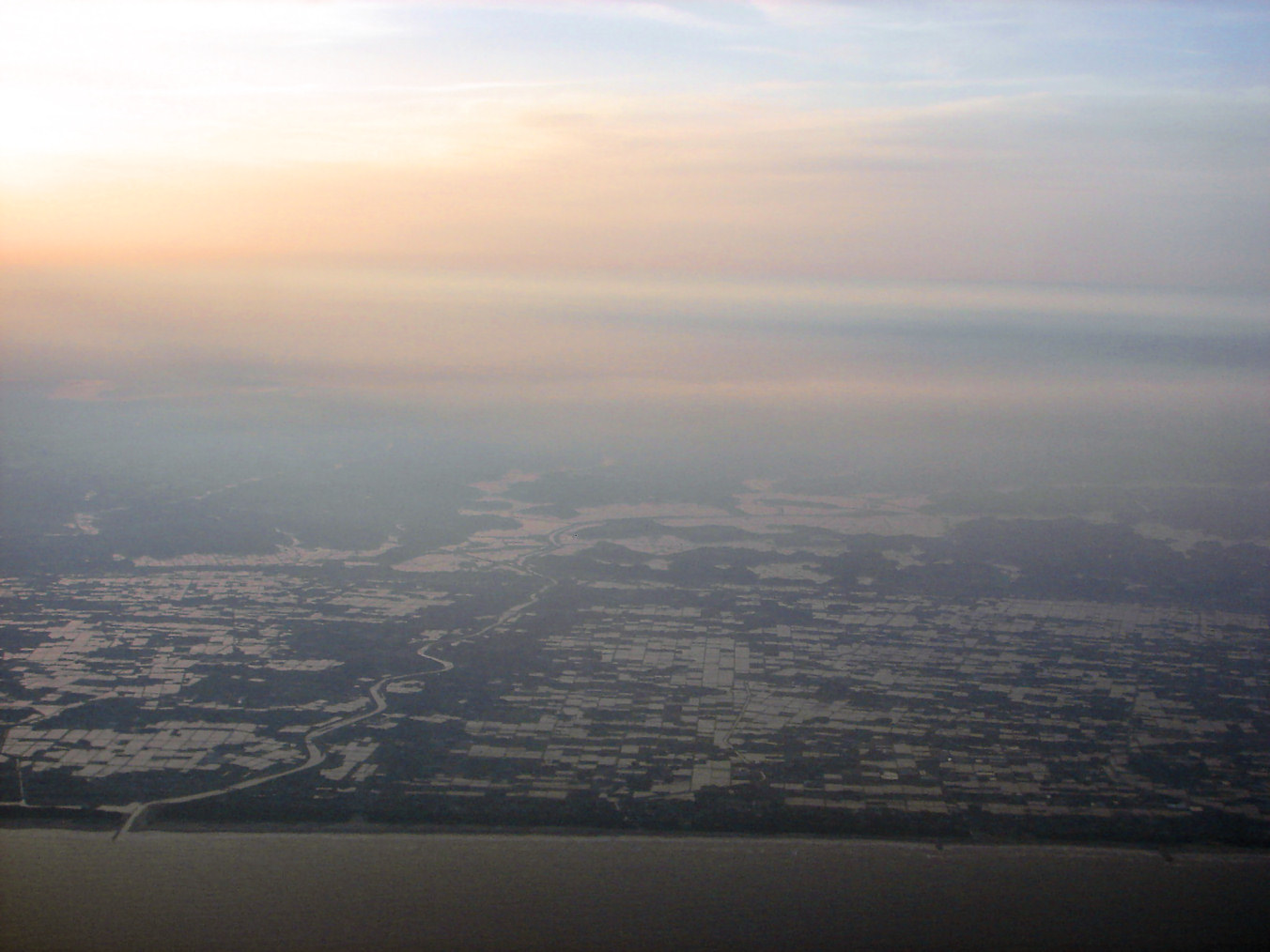

- Flag Seal

- Location of Sōsa in Chiba Prefecture

- Coordinates: 35°42′27″N 140°33′51″E
- Country: Japan
- Region: Kantō
- Prefecture: Chiba
- First official recorded: 90 BC
- As city settled for Yōkaichiba: July 1, 1954
- As current city's name changed: January 23, 2006

Government
  - Mayor: Yasunori Ohta

Area
  - Total: 101.78 km^{2} (39.30 sq mi)

Population (October 2020)
  - Total: 35,674
  - Density: 350.50/km^{2} (907.79/sq mi)
- Time zone: UTC+9 (Japan Standard Time)
- Symbols
- -tree: Podocarpus macrophyllus
  - Flower: Tulip
  - Bird: Japanese bush-warbler
- Phone number: 0479-73-0084
- Address: 793-2 Yōkaichiba Sasakawa Sōsa-shi, Chiba-ken 285-8510
- Website: Official website

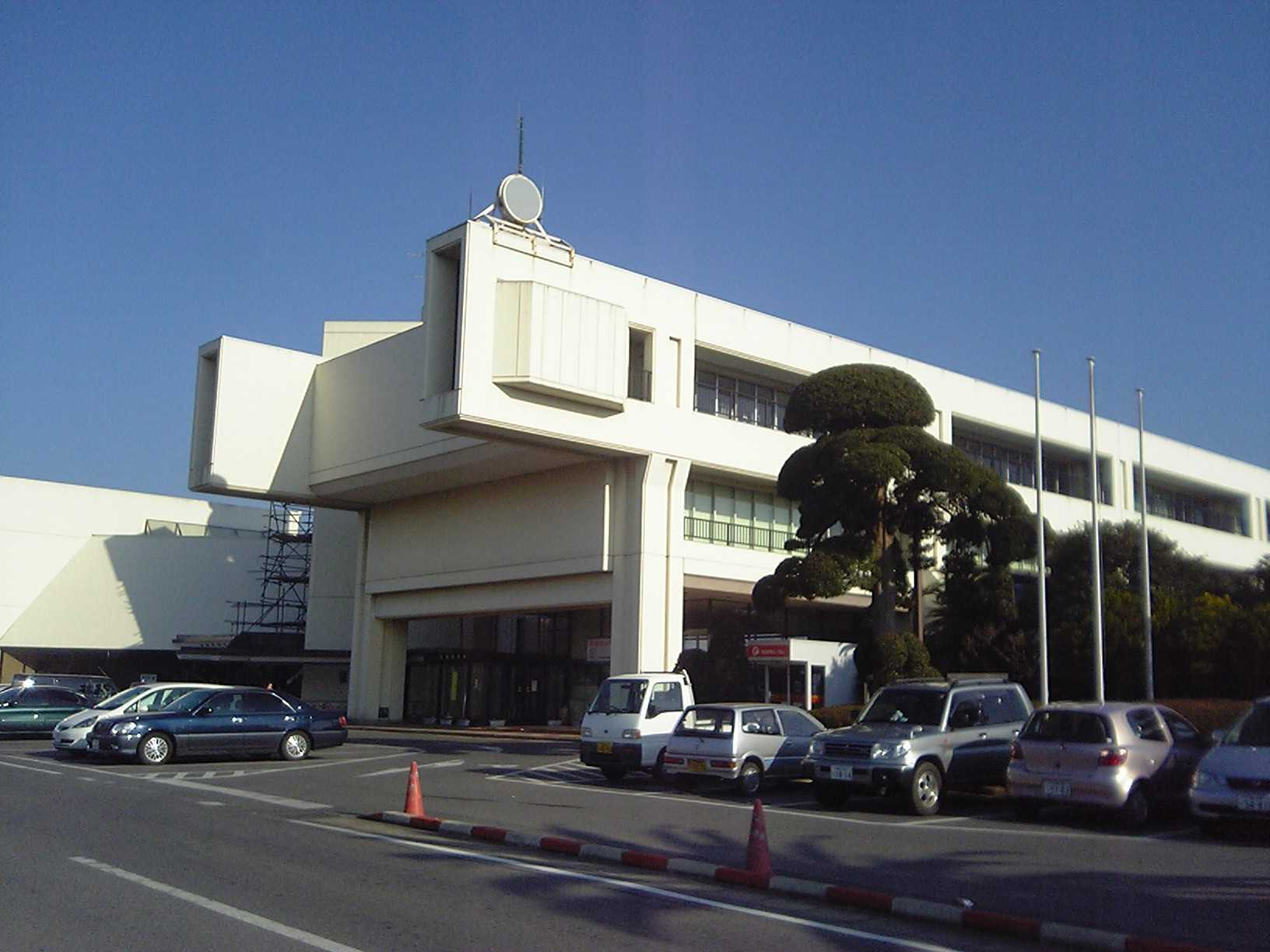
Sōsa City Hall

Sōsa (匝瑳市, Sōsa-shi) is a city located in Chiba Prefecture, Japan. As of 1 October 2020, the city had an estimated population of 35,674 in 14,688 households and a population density of 350 persons per km^{2}. The total area of the city is 101.78 square kilometres (39.30 sq mi).

== Geography ==
Sōsa is located in far northeastern Chiba Prefecture. It is bordered to the north by the Pacific Ocean on the southwest. The land is mostly flat, and much is from 40 to 50 meters above sea level in average elevation.

The northern section, a mixture of valleys, ports and rice fields, consists of a plateau made up of complicated terrain and features. The southern half consists of flat terrain facing Kujūkuri Beach.

Through the center of the city runs both the Japan Railways (JR) Sōbu Main Line and Japan National Route 126, which run east–west. To the west of the center of Sosa is Japan National Route 296, which runs north–south.

=== Neighboring municipalities ===
Chiba Prefecture

- Asahi
- Katori
- Tako
- Yokoshibahikari

=== Climate ===
Sōsa has a humid subtropical climate (Köppen Cfa) characterized by warm summers and cool winters with light to no snowfall. The average annual temperature in Sōsa is 15.0 °C. The average annual rainfall is 1557 mm with September as the wettest month. The temperatures are highest on average in August, at around 25.9 °C, and lowest in January, at around 5.1 °C.

== Demographics ==

Sōsa City and National Population	Sōsa City Population
Distribution by Age (2005)	Distribution by Gender (2005)

■ = Sōsa City	■ = Male
■ = Japan (National)	■ = Female

=== Census statistics ===
Historical population
Year	Pop.	±%
1920	35,188	—
1930	37,399	+6.3%
1940	38,790	+3.7%
1950	48,924	+26.1%
1960	44,568	−8.9%
1970	40,186	−9.8%
1980	41,160	+2.4%
1990	42,261	+2.7%
2000	42,914	+1.5%
2010	39,814	−7.2%
2020	35,040	−12.0%
Source: Source: Japan Statistics Department, Ministry of Internal Affairs and Communications / National Census (translated), citypopulation.de

== History ==
Sōsa was founded on January 23, 2006, as a result of the merger between the former city of Yōkaichiba, and the former town of Nosaka (from Sōsa District).

A 8 December 1915
B 3 November 1948
C 31 March 1954
D 1 July 1954
E 17 July 1954
F 23 January 2006

=== Events ===
- 1 June 1897 – Yōkaichiba Station opened.
- 9 October 1946 – Service on Narita Railway Tako Line was discontinued.
- 1 April 1970 – Japan National Route 296 was opened.
- 23 January 2006 – Yōkaichiba City and Nosaka Town were merged to form Sōsa City.

== Government ==
Sōsa has a mayor-council form of government with a directly elected mayor and a unicameral city council of 18 members. Sōsa contributes one member to the Chiba Prefectural Assembly. In terms of national politics, the city is part of Chiba 10th district of the lower house of the Diet of Japan.

== Economy ==
Sōsa is a regional commercial center whose economy is primarily agricultural. Sōsa is well known for growing trees that are sold all over Japan.

=== Major retail ===
==== Shopping ====
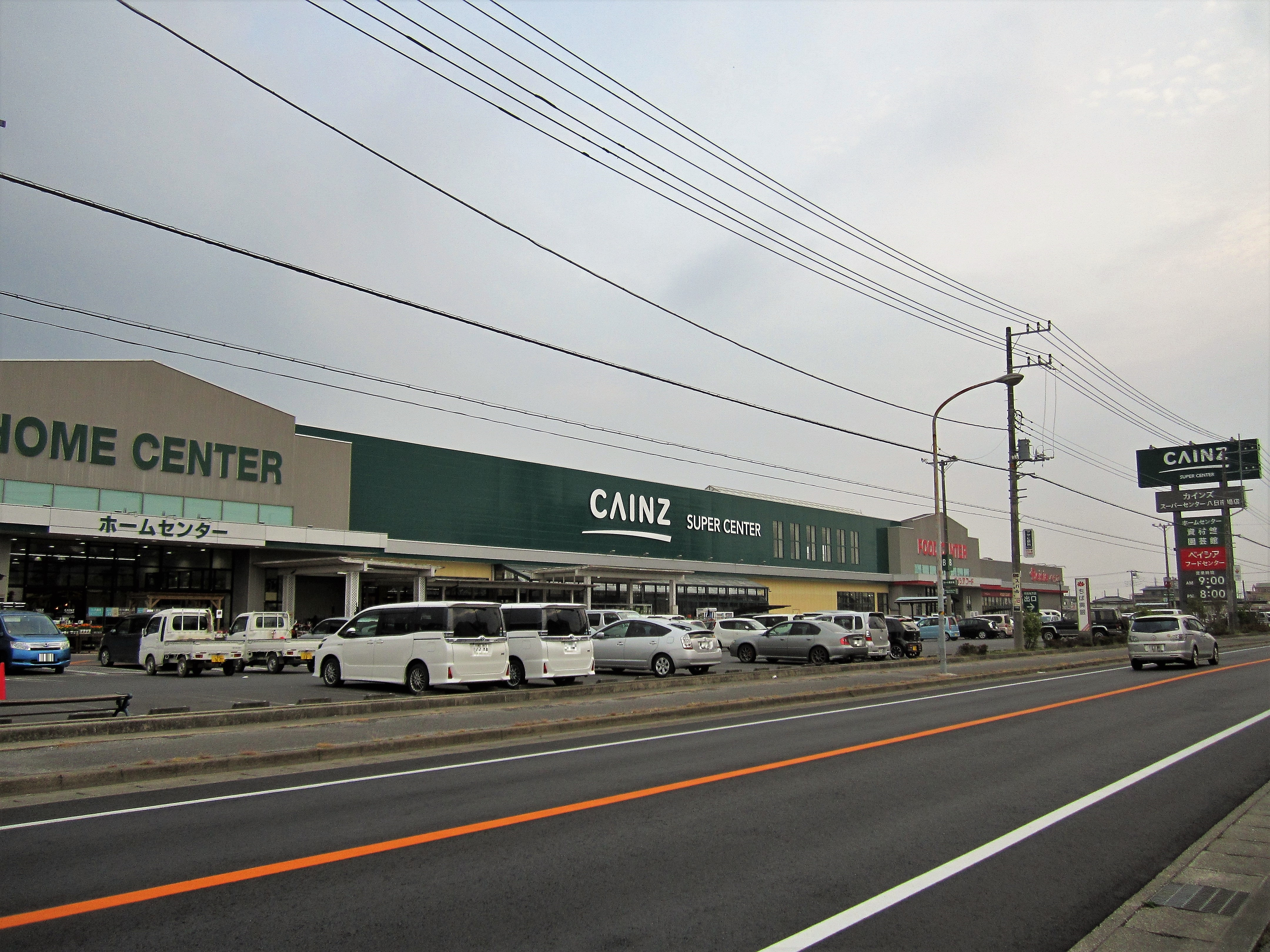
CAINZ HOME Super Center

- Cainz Home Super Center, Yōkaichiba (Includes Beisia supermarket)
- Ocean Mart 126 (shopping mall)...closed due to The 2011 off the Pacific coast of Tohoku Earthquake

==== Financial institutions ====
- Chiba Bank, Yōkaichiba Branch
- Chiba Industrial Bank, Yōkaichiba Branch
- Choshi Credit Union, Yōkaichiba Branch
- Keiyo Bank, Yōkaichiba Branch

== Education ==
=== High schools ===
- Keiai University Yōkaichiba High School
- Sōsa Prefectural Public High School, Chiba Prefecture

=== Junior high schools ===
- Nosaka Public Junior High School
- Yōkaichiba Public Junior High School No. 1
- Yōkaichiba Public Junior High School No. 2

=== Elementary schools ===
- Chinkai Public Elementary School
- Heiwa Public Elementary School
- Iidaka Public Elementary School
- Kyoko Public Elementary School
- Noda Public Elementary School
- Sakae Public Elementary School
- Sosa Public Elementary School
- Suka Public Elementary School
- Toyosaka Public Elementary School
- Toyowa Public Elementary School
- Yōkaichiba Public Elementary School
- Yoshida Public Elementary School

== Transportation ==
=== Railway ===
JR East – Sōbu Main Line

- Iigura – Yōkaichiba

=== Bus transportation ===
==== Municipal bus routes ====
- Purple Line (to Toyosaka, Yoshida)
- Pink (to Idaka, Sosa)
- Orange (to Toyowa, Chinkai)
- Yellow (to Heiwa, Kyoko)
- Light Green (to Noda, Eastern-Suka)
- Light Blue (to Sakae, Western- Suka)

=== Major bus companies ===
- JR Bus Kanto Company
- Chiba Kotsu

==== Highway bus ====
===== Yōkaichiba Bus Route (Tokyo Station – Sōsa City Hall) =====
Bus stops at the following areas:

- Tokyo Station (Departing from Tokyo Station: Yaesu Entrance, Arriving at Tokyo Station: Nihonbashi Entrance)
- Tomisato Bus Terminal
- Tomisato Nanae Square
- Radisson Hotel
- Sanrizuka Park
- Jitaku (Residential) Entrance
- Kuko Hakubutsukan (Aviation Museum)
- Shiromasu
- Somei
- Tako
- Tako Michi no Eki (Road Station)
- Yoshida
- JR Bus- Yōkaichiba Branch
- JR Yōkaichiba Station
- Sōsa City Hall

===== Choshi-Chiba-Makuhari Route =====
Bus stops at the following areas:

- License (Menkyo) Center
- JR Kaihimmakuhari Station
- Chiba Minato Station (Monorail)
- Chiba Central Station (Keisei)
- JR Chiba Station
- Chuo 3 Chome (Central District 3)
- Matsuo-Yokoshiba IC (Highway Interchange)
- Matsuo
- Yokoshiba
- Iigura
- Yokaichiba
- Sosa City Hall
- JR Higata Station
- Asahi
- Unakami
- Iioka Health and Welfare Center
- Iioka
- Kousoku Yagi
- Kousoku Obama
- Kousoku Misakicho
- Toshiba
- Jinyacho

=== Roadways ===
==== National highways ====
- National Route 126
- National Route 296

==== Prefectural roads ====
===== Main artery roads =====
- Chiba Prefectural Road 16, Sawara – Yōkaichiba Line
- Chiba Prefectural Road 30, Iioka – Ichinomiya Line
- Chiba Prefectural Road 45, Yōkaichiba – Yachimata Line
- Chiba Prefectural Road 48, Yōkaichiba – Nosaka Line
- Chiba Prefectural Road 49, Yōkaichiba – Sakae Line
- Chiba Prefectural Road 74, Tako – Sasamoto Line

===== General roads =====
- Chiba Prefectural Road 104, Yokaichiba – Idono – Asahi Line
- Chiba Prefectural Road 106, Yokaichiba – Sawara Line
- Chiba Prefectural Road 109, Yokoshiba Depot – Yoshida Line
- Chiba Prefectural Road 114, Yokaichiba – Yamada Line
- Chiba Prefectural Road 122, Iioka – Katakai Line
- Chiba Prefectural Road 149, Yōkaichiba – Fuma Line
- Chiba Prefectural Road 212, Yōkaichiba Depot Line
- Chiba Prefectural Road 299, Heiwa – Kyoko Line

===== Farm road =====
- Toso Region Farm Roads

==== Area highways, toll roads ====
===== Choshi Renraku Road =====
- Currently the above road is not within city limits, but according to plans, the Yōkaichiba IC (Interchange) is planned for construction. The plan is to extend the road from Yokoshiba-Hikari IC area toward the city of Choshi.

== Places and events ==
=== Locations ===
- Chōfuku Temple (in Kawamukai area)

- Shingon-Chisan, Buddhist Sect (Setsubun Buddhist Mass is held every new year)

- Chōtoku Temple
- Iidaka Temple (known locally as “Iidaka Danrin (ato)”)
- Oio Shrine which dates back to Emperor Sujin Era, Year 7 (258 AD)
- Suka Eastern Orthodox Church

=== Exhibition and community areas ===
- Fureai Koen (Park)- Yōkaichiba

- Formally named the “Municipal and Agricultural Exchange Terminal Community Park of Yōkaichiba”, Sosa City established and controls this institution for the promotion of activity in local industry with the intention of exchange between the municipal and the agricultural parts of the city.

- Horikawa-hama (Beach) Swimming Area

- At a shoreline of roughly 150m, this beach area's waves are calm compared to nearby Kujukuri Beach.

- Matsuyama Art Museum

=== Festivals ===
- Odaka Hadaka Matsuri (early January)
- Jinkumi Lion Dance (every January)
- Yōkaichiba Bon Festival Dance
- (Yaegaki Shrine) Gion Festival (every August 4 & 5)
- Yokappe Festival (every October)

== Notable people of Sōsa ==
- Yumiko Kobayashi (voice actress)
- Nichirō (Buddhist prelate, Kamakura Era)
