= Nihon University Junior College =

Private junior college in Japan

- 日本大学短期大学部
- Type: private
- Established: 1950
- President: Katsue Kojima
- Location: Narashino, Chiba; 35°43′24.2″N 140°3′36.7″E; Fujisawa, Kanagawa; 35°22′44.5″N 139°28′1.4″E; Mishima, Shizuoka; 35°7′54.9″N 138°54′53.4″E, Japan
- Colors: pink

Nihon University Junior College (日本大学短期大学部, Nihon daigaku tanki daigakubu) is a private junior college located in Japan. The college has six departments, spread out over three separate campuses.

== Campuses ==
=== Funabashi Campus, Chiba ===
- Department of Construction
- Department of Engineering Science
- Department of Applied Chemistry

=== Shonan Campus, Kanagawa ===
- Department of Bioresource Sciences

=== Mishima Campus, Shizuoka ===
- Department of Food and Nutrition
- Department of Commerce and Economics
