= Yōkaichiba, Chiba =

Yōkaichiba 八日市場市
- Former City
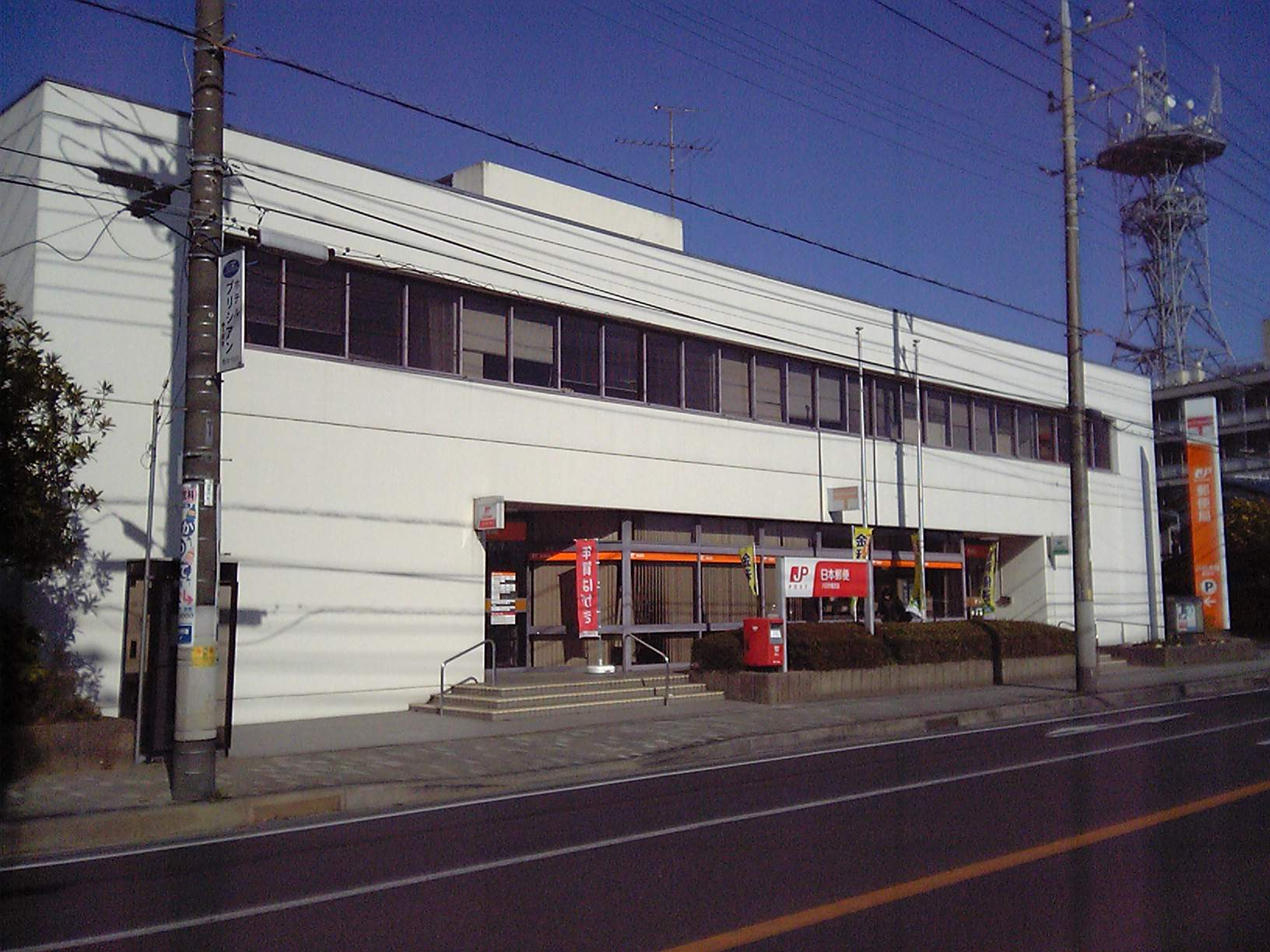
- Yōkaichiba Post Office

- Flag Seal

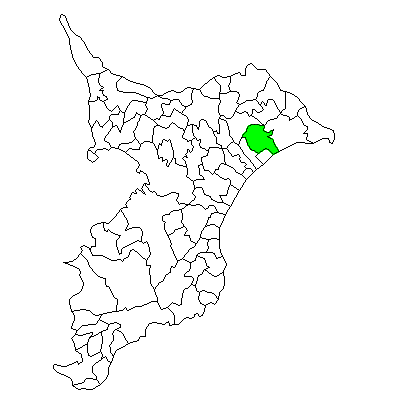
- Location of Yōkaichiba in Chiba Prefecture

- Location in Japan
- Coordinates: 35°42′00″N 140°33′37.52″E
- Country: Japan
- Region: Kantō
- Prefecture: Chiba Prefecture
- Merged: January 23, 2006 (now part of Sōsa)

Area
  - Total: 80.75 km^{2} (31.18 sq mi)

Population (September 30, 2005)
  - Total: 32,227
  - Density: 399/km^{2} (1,030/sq mi)
- Time zone: UTC+09:00 (JST)
- Symbols
- Bird: Japanese bush-warbler
- Flower: Camellia
- Tree: Podocarpus macrophyllus

Yōkaichiba (八日市場市, Yōkaichiba-shi) was a city located in northeastern Chiba Prefecture, Japan.

Fukuoka Town was established on April 1, 1889, within Sōsa District, Chiba. It changed its name to Yōkaichiba on December 8, 1915. On March 31, 1954, the town expanded greatly through the annexation of the neighboring villages of Heiwa, Chinkai, Sōsa, Toyosaka, Suga, Kyōkō, Yoshida, Iidaka, and Toyowa, all within Sōsa District. Yōkaichiba was elevated to city status on July 1, 1954.

On January 23, 2006, Yōkaichiba was merged with the town of Nosaka (from Sōsa District) to create the city of Sōsa.

Yōkaichiba Tōshō-gū is a local Shinto shrine.
