= Hikari, Chiba =

Dissolved municipality in Chiba prefecture, Japan

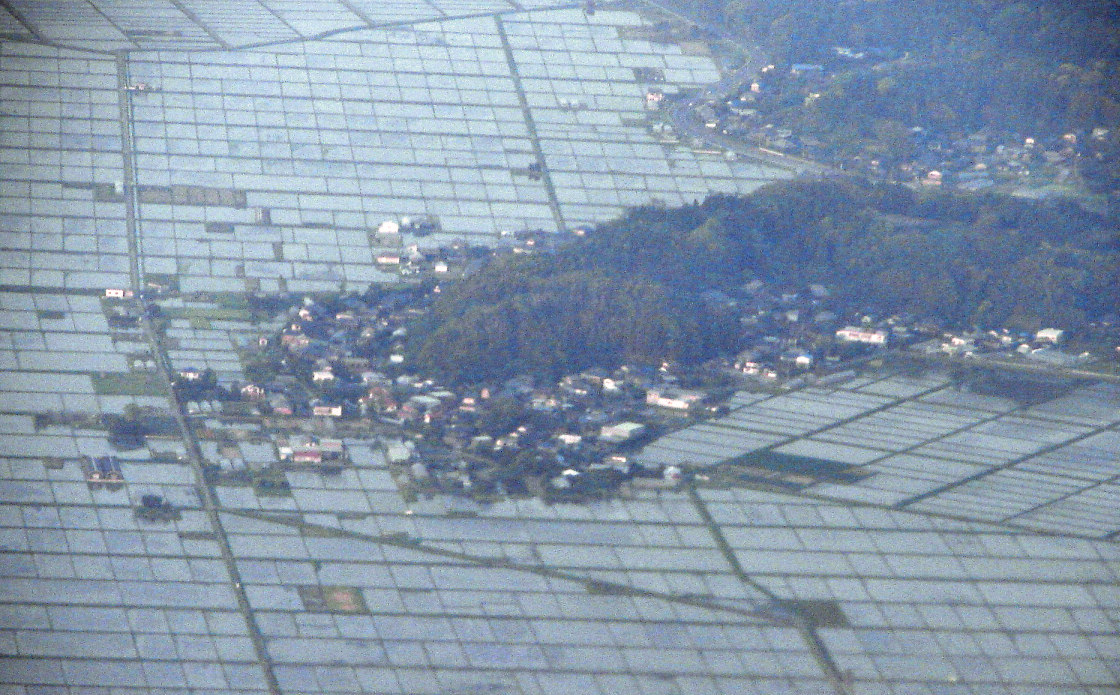
Hikari (near Arai)

Hikari (光町, Hikari-machi) was a town located in Sōsa District, Chiba Prefecture, Japan.

In 2003, the town had an estimated population of 12,055 and a density of 361.90 persons per square kilometer (937.3 persons/mi^{2}). The total area was 33.31 square kilometers (12.86 sq mi).

On March 27, 2006, Hikari, along with the town of Yokoshiba (from Sanbu District), was merged to create the town of Yokoshibahikari. The new town is in Sanbu District; Sōsa District was dissolved as a result of this merger.
