= Sōsa District, Chiba =

Former district in Chiba prefecture, Japan

Sōsa District (匝瑳郡, Sōsa-gun) was a district located in Chiba Prefecture, Japan.

The district was dissolved March 27, 2006 when the town of Hikari was merged with the town of Yokoshiba (from Sanbu District) to create the town of Yokoshibahikari, with the new town designated as part of Sanbu District.

== History ==
During the early Meiji period establishment of the municipality system on April 1, 1889, Sōsa District, consisting of one town (Fukuoka) and 13 villages were formed.

=== Timeline ===
- On December 8, 1915 - Fukuoka was renamed Yōkaichiba.
- On November 3, 1948 - the villages of Yoshida, Iitaka, Toyowa, and Hiyoshi (all from Katori District) were redesignated as part of Sōsa District.
- On March 31, 1954 - the town of Yōkaichiba expanded through annexation of the neighboring villages of Heiwa, Tsubakimi, Sosa, Toyosaka, Suga, Kyoko, Yoshida, Iitaka, and Toyowa.
- On May 3, 1954 - the villages of Nanjo, Toyo, Shirahama, and Hiyoshi were merged to create the town of Hikari.
- On June 1, 1954 - the villages of Kyowa and Toyohata were merged into the town of Asahi in Kaijo District.
- On July 1, 1954 - Yōkaichiba was elevated to city status.
- On July 17, 1954 - the villages of Sakae and Noda were merged to create the town of Nosaka, which left the district with two towns and no villages.
- On January 23, 2006 - Nosaka was merged with the city of Yōkaichiba to create the city of Sōsa.
- On March 27, 2006 - Hikari was merged with the town of Yokoshiba (from Sanbu District) to create the town of Yokoshibahikari (in Sanbu District). Therefore, Sōsa District was dissolved as a result of this merger.

== See also ==
- List of dissolved districts of Japan
