= Nosaka, Chiba =

Nozaka 野栄町
- Former municipality
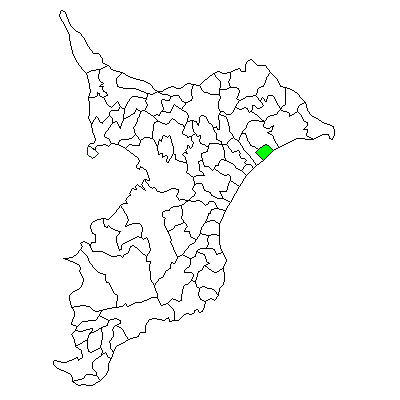
- Location of Nozaka in Chiba Prefecture

- Location in Japan
- Coordinates: 35°39′50″N 140°34′36.90″E
- Country: Japan
- Region: Kantō
- Prefecture: Chiba Prefecture
- District: Sōsa
- Merged: January 23, 2006 (now part of Sōsa)

Area
  - Total: 21.03 km^{2} (8.12 sq mi)

Population (September 30, 2005)
  - Total: 9,894
  - Density: 460/km^{2} (1,200/sq mi)
- Time zone: UTC+09:00 (JST)
- Symbols
- Flower: Camellia sasanqua
- Tree: Pinus thunbergii

Nosaka (野栄町, Nosaka-machi) was a town located in Sōsa District Chiba Prefecture, Japan.

== History ==
Noda and Sakae villages were established on April 1, 1889, within Sōsa District, Chiba. The two villages merged on July 17, 1954, to form Nosaka Town.

== Merge ==
On January 23, 2006, Nozaka was merged with the neighboring city of Yōkaichiba to create the city of Sōsa.
