= Omigawa =

Omigawa may refer to:

- Omigawa, Chiba, a former town in Katori District, Chiba Prefecture, Japan
- Omigawa Domain, a feudal domain in Chiba Prefecture, Japan
- Omigawa Station, a railway station in Tōnoshō, Chiba Prefecture, Japan

== People with the surname ==
- Chiaki Omigawa (小見川 千明, born 1989), Japanese actress and voice actress
- Michihiro Omigawa (小見川 道大, born 1975), Japanese mixed martial artist

== See also ==
- Ōmigawa Station, a railway station in Kashiwazaki, Niigata Prefecture, Japan
