= 総州 =

総州 or 總州 may refer to:

- Fusa Province, all abbreviated name was following Sōshū (総州)
  - Awa Province (Chiba), province of Japan located in what is today Chiba Prefecture
  - Kazusa Province, province of Japan located in what is today Chiba Prefecture
  - Shimōsa Province, province of Japan located in what is today Chiba Prefecture and Ibaraki Prefecture
- Zong Prefecture (總州), a prefecture between the 7th and 14th centuries in modern Gao County, Yibin, Sichuan, China
