= Sōshū =

Sōshū or Soshu may refer to:

- Sōshū (相州)
  - Sagami Province (相模国)
- Sōshū (総州)
  - Fusa Province (総国)
  - Kazusa Province (上総国)
  - Shimōsa Province (下総国)
    - Kazusa and Shimōsa are also called Ryōsō (両総) or Nisō (二総).
