= Naruse Yukinari =

Naruse Yukinari (成瀬 之成; 1596 – 1634) was a Japanese daimyō of the early Edo period. He served as the second lord of Kurihara Domain in Shimōsa Province and was a vassal of Tokugawa Hidetada and later Tokugawa Iemitsu.

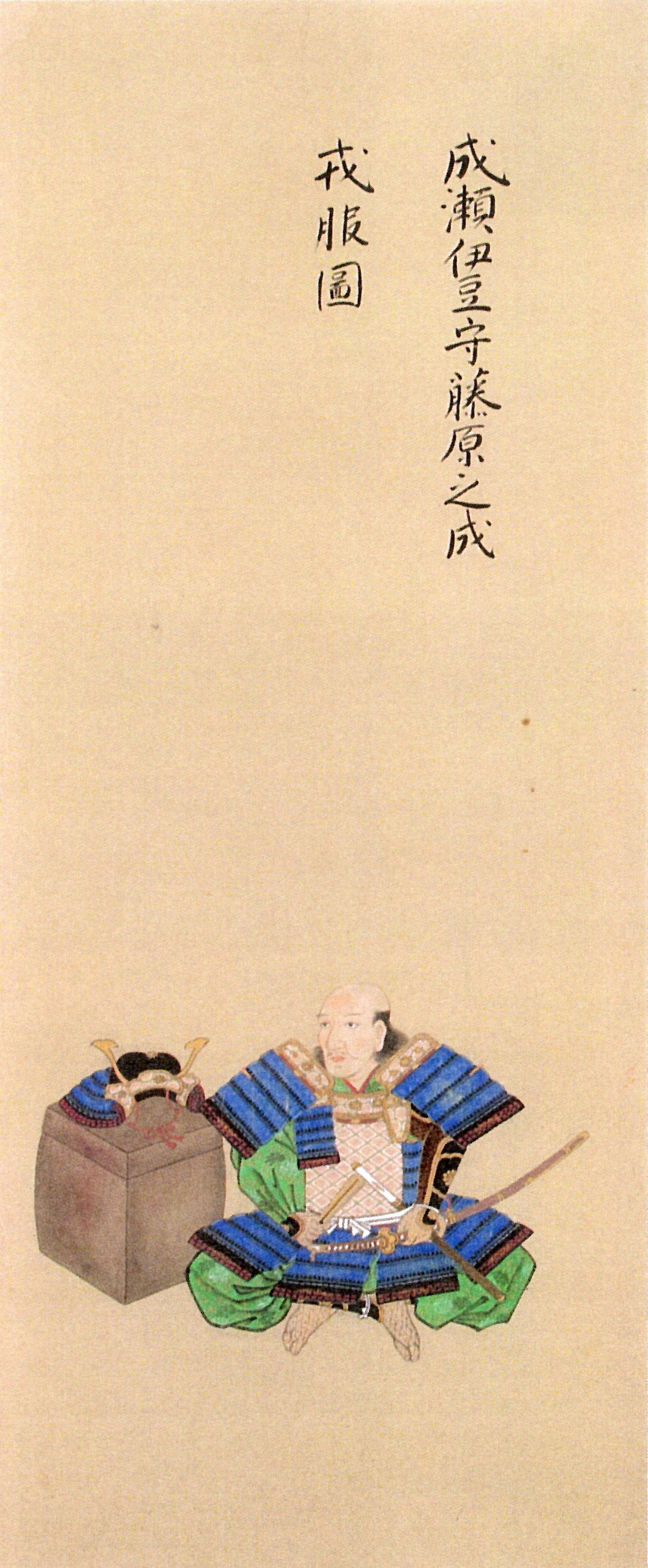
Naruse Yukinari
