= Miyaoi Yasuo =

Japanese rural intellectual (1797–1858)

- 宮負定雄
- Born: 1797; Matsuzawa Village, Katori District, Shimousa Province (present-day Asahi City, Chiba Prefecture)
- Died: 1858 (aged 60–61)
- Occupations: Village headman, writer, rural intellectual
- Known for: Kidan zasshi

Miyaoi Yasuo (宮負定雄; 1797–1858) was a Japanese rural intellectual, village headman, and writer from Matsuzawa Village in Katori District, Shimousa Province (present-day Asahi City, Chiba Prefecture). He is known for Kidan zasshi (奇談雑史, A Collection of Strange Tales), a compilation of strange tales written in 1858 that challenges the Confucian moral hierarchy placing humans above animals.

== Life and background ==
Miyaoi was born into a farming household in Matsuzawa Village, a long-established agricultural community appearing in records as early as the twelfth century. He served as village headman and participated in local governance. He described the village as "remote" and portrayed himself as a farmer who had worked in the fields since childhood. He also took pride in practical learning related to agricultural administration and engaged in publishing activities, criticising literary and poetic pursuits as not constituting genuine learning. His self-identification as a farmer was not merely a simple occupational label but rather a stance opposing urban literary intellectuals.

== Kidan zasshi ==
Kidan zasshi is a compilation of 160 strange tales gathered from various sources, including accounts of animals that either assist or harm humans, as well as stories of humans transforming into animals and vice versa. Miyaoi regarded the stories as historical truths rather than allegories, through which he aimed to instil moral values in people who lacked formal education. In the preface, Miyaoi states that "from 1853 I gathered and edited strange tales that I had long enjoyed hearing," and explains that the purpose of Kidan zasshi was "simply to record facts in order to admonish the young." He sometimes emphasises the realism of his stories by presenting them as experiences of his contemporaries, for example specifying details such as "November 1854, Mariko post station on the Tōkaidō, the farmer Kyūsuke."

=== Reincarnation and human–animal relations ===
Kidan zasshi contains multiple accounts of humans reincarnating as animals or plants. For instance, there are stories depicting individuals consumed by obsession during their lifetimes who are reborn as snakes after death to seek revenge. Similarly, those who die without repaying debts are reborn as oxen or horses to work off their obligations. For farmers, oxen and horses were indispensable labour resources in daily life, leading to their conceptualisation as reincarnation forms for humans repaying debts or fulfilling obligations. Miyaoi and his contemporaries believed that a person's actions in life determined the type of animal they would be reborn as. Stories of people becoming oxen in order to repay debts also appear in Nihon ryōiki, the oldest Japanese Buddhist tale collection, suggesting that Miyaoi's worldview was part of a long-lived narrative tradition shared across social strata.

Animals are also depicted transforming into humans. Animals subjected to harm or kindness by humans change their forms to repay those actions. This concept is not limited to foxes and raccoon dogs, traditionally believed to shapeshift, but extends to turtles, birds, and fish, who transform into humans to communicate through language. One tale recounts an ambitious physician who created medicines using animal-derived ingredients; in retaliation, a coalition of birds, beasts, insects, and fish conspired against him, successfully thwarting the publication of his work. Although the aversion to killing aligns with Buddhist values, Miyaoi's perspective goes further, viewing animals as sentient beings sharing emotions and ethical principles.

The tales also include accounts of loyal dogs, cats, and monkeys that take on their masters' illnesses or avenge their masters' enemies. Such animals were honoured with funerals comparable to those of humans, with graves or burial mounds that still existed during Miyaoi's time. Even creatures typically regarded as weak, such as aphids or eels, are depicted as capable of seeking revenge against humans.

=== Broader significance ===
In nineteenth-century Japan, urban intellectuals often adhered to a Confucian view of animals that portrayed them as morally and intellectually inferior to humans. Miyaoi's outlook, shaped by his experience in a rural village, reflects a contrasting perspective that resists seeing humans and animals in a binary framework. Humans and animals are thought to share ethics and emotions, with consistent behaviour in response to virtuous or immoral actions. The late Edo period is often portrayed as a move toward modern rationalism, yet Kidan zasshi does not treat animals and humans as opposing beings but finds emotional commonality between them and allows for the possibility of mutual rebirth. Rather than a primitive belief system, such ideas reveal an alternative ethical framework for human–animal relations that coexisted with emerging modern rationalism.

== Bibliography ==
Works by Miyaoi Yasuo:

- 宮負定雄 [Miyaoi Yasuo]. 奇談雑史 [Kidan zasshi, A collection of strange tales]. Tokyo: 筑摩書房 [Chikuma Shobō], 2010.
- 宮負定雄 [Miyaoi Yasuo]. "民家要術 [Essential Techniques for Rural Households]." In 近世地方経済史料 [Kinsei chihō keizai shiryō] vol. 5, edited by 小野武夫 [Ono Takeo], 263–320. Tokyo: 近世地方経済史料刊行会 [Kinsei chihō keizai shiryō kankou-kai], 1932.
- 宮負定雄 [Miyaoi Yasuo]. 農業要集 [Nōgyō yōshū]. In 日本農書全集 [Nihon nōsho zenshū], vol. 3. Tokyo: 農山漁村文化協会 [Nōsan Gyoson Bunka Kyōkai], 1979: 3–64.
- 宮負定雄 [Miyaoi Yasuo]. 草木撰種録 [Sōmoku senshu roku]. In 日本農書全集 [Nihon nōsho zenshū], vol. 3. Tokyo: 農山漁村文化協会 [Nōsan Gyoson Bunka Kyōkai], 1979: 65–74.

Further reading:

- 板東洋介 [Bandō Yōsuke]. "犬をめぐる論争：国儒論争における動物観の対立と帰趨 [A controversy surrounding the dog: The conflict and consequence of the notion of animal in the Confucianist-nativist controversy]." 日本文学研究ジャーナル [Academic journal of Japanese literature] 25 (2023): 49–63.
- Kojima, Yasunori. "Hirao Rosen: Late-Tokugawa Folklorist from Tsugaru Domain." Asian Cultural Studies 36 (2010): 1–22. doi:10.34577/00002811.
