= Taiei, Chiba =

Taiei 大栄町
- Former municipality
- Flag Seal

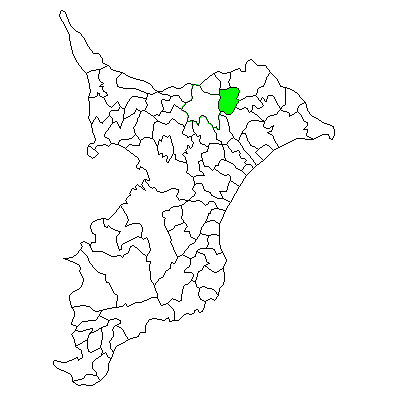
- Location of Taiei in Chiba Prefecture

- Location in Japan
- Coordinates: 35°50′38″N 140°22′01″E
- Country: Japan
- Region: Kantō
- Prefecture: Chiba Prefecture
- District: Katori
- Merged: March 27, 2006 (now part of Narita)

Area
  - Total: 50.57 km^{2} (19.53 sq mi)

Population (February 2006)
  - Total: 12,507
  - Density: 247/km^{2} (640/sq mi)
- Time zone: UTC+09:00 (JST)
- Website: Town of Taiei
- Symbols
- Tree: Camellia sasanqua

Taiei (大栄町, Taiei-machi) was a town located in Katori District, Chiba Prefecture, Japan.

== Geography ==
Taiei is located on Route 51 from Narita to Sawara. It has a very scenic countryside with views of the Narita International Airport runways and aircraft. At Raikodai there is a large industrial estate.

== History ==
Modern Taiei Town was established on February 11, 1955 through the merger of the villages of Shoei and Osuka.

On March 27, 2006, Taiei, along with the town of Shimofusa (also from Katori District), was merged into the expanded city of Narita, and thus no longer exists as an independent municipality.

== Population ==
In February 2006 (the last data available before its merger into Narita), the town had an estimated population of 12,507 and a population density of 247 persons per km^{2}. Its total area was 50.57 km^{2}.
