= Omigawa Domain =

Omigawa Domain 小見川藩
- under Tokugawa shogunate Japan
- 1594–1871
- Capital: Omigawa jin'ya
  - Type: Daimyō
- Historical era: Edo period
  - Established: 1594
  - Disestablished: 1871
- Today part of: part of Chiba Prefecture

Omigawa Domain (小見川藩, Omigawa-han) was a minor feudal domain under the Tokugawa shogunate of Edo period Japan, located in Shimōsa Province (modern-day Chiba Prefecture), Japan. It was centered on what is now part of the city of Katori. It was ruled for most of its history by the Uchida clan.

== History ==
Omigawai Domain was created for Matsudaira Ietada in 1594, a close associate of Tokugawa Ieyasu. After his death at the Battle of Sekigahara, the domain passed to Doi Toshikatsu, another close retainer of Tokugawa Ieyasu who played a crucial role in the formation of the Tokugawa shogunate. After he was transferred to Sakura Domain, Omigawa was granted to Andō Shigenobu, a retainer of Tokugawa Hidetada, who had also fought at Sekigahara. On his transfer to Takasaki Domain in 1619, Omigawa Domain reverted to tenryō status, directly under the control of the shogunate and administered by a series of hatamoto -level officials.

Omigawa Domain was revived in 1724 for Uchida Masachika, who was demoted in status from the 15,000 koku daimyō of Kanuma Domain in Kōzuke Province to 10,000 koku at Omigawa due to crimes committed by his father Uchida Masayuki. He was allowed to build a jin'ya in what later become the town of Omigawa, Chiba, where his successors continued to rule until the Meiji Restoration. The final daimyō of Omigawa Domain, Uchida Masanori fought on the imperial side during the Boshin War, and later became an officer in the Imperial Japanese Army, serving in combat during the First Sino-Japanese War.

== Holdings at the end of the Edo period ==
As with most domains in the han system, Omigawa Domain consisted of several discontinuous territories calculated to provide the assigned kokudaka, based on periodic cadastral surveys and projected agricultural yields.

- Shimōsa Province
  - 17 villages in Katori District
  - 1 village in Kaijō District
- Mutsu Province (Iwashiro Province)
  - 9 villages in Shirakawa District

== List of daimyō ==
#	Name	Tenure	Courtesy title	Court Rank	revenues
Matsudaira (Fuko) clan (fudai) 1594–1601
1	Matsudaira Ietada (松平家忠)	1594–1600	-none-	-none-	10,000 koku
2	Matsudaira Tadatoshi (松平忠利)	1600–1601	Tonomo-no-kami(主殿頭)	Lower 5th (従五位下)	10,000 koku
Doi clan (fudai) 1602–1610
1	Doi Toshikatsu (土井利勝)	1602–1610	Ōi-no-kami (大炊頭); Jiju (侍従)	Lower 4th (従四位下)	10, 000 koku
Andō clan (fudai) 1612–1619
1	Andō Shigenobu (安藤重信)	1612–1619	Tsushima-no-kami (対馬守)	Lower 5th (従五位下)	16, 000 koku
x	tenryō	1619–1724			
Uchida clan (fudai) 1724–1871
1	Uchida Masachika (内田正親)	1724–1746	Dewa-no-kami (出羽守)	Lower 5th (従五位下)	10, 000 koku
2	Uchida Masayoshi (内田正美)	1746–1753	Dewa-no-kami (出羽守)	Lower 5th (従五位下)	10,000 koku
3	Uchida Masayoshi (内田正良)	1753–1782	Omi-no-kami (近江守)	Lower 5th (従五位下)	10,000 koku
4	Uchida Masazumi (内田正純)	1782–1806	Ise-no-kami (伊勢守)	Lower 5th (従五位下)	10,000 koku
5	Uchida Masamoto (内田正肥)	1806–1816	Omi-no-kami (近江守)	Lower 5th (従五位下)	10,000 koku
6	Uchida Masakata (内田正容)	1816–1837	Ise-no-kami (伊勢守)	Lower 5th (従五位下)	10,000 koku
7	Uchida Masamichi (内田正道)	1837–1851	Bungo-no-kami (豊後守)	Lower 5th (従五位下)	10, 000 koku
8	Uchida Masanori (内田正徳)	1851–1863	Tonomo-no-kami (主殿頭)	Lower 5th (従五位下)	10,000 koku
9	Uchida Masatsuna (内田正縄)	1863–1864	Tonomo-no-kami (主殿頭)	Lower 5th (従五位下)	10,000 koku
10	Uchida Masaakira (内田正学)	1864–1871	Tonomo-no-kami (主殿頭)	Lower 5th (従五位下)	10,000 koku
