= Iioka, Chiba =

Iioka 飯岡町
- Former municipality
- Location in Japan
- Coordinates: 35°42′N 140°43′E
- Country: Japan
- Region: Kantō
- Prefecture: Chiba Prefecture
- District: Kaijō
- Merged: July 1, 2005 (now part of Asahi)

Area
  - Total: 18.27 km^{2} (7.05 sq mi)

Population (April 2005)
  - Total: 10,954
  - Density: 600/km^{2} (1,600/sq mi)
- Time zone: UTC+09:00 (JST)

Iioka (飯岡町, Iioka-machi) was a town located in Kaijō District, Chiba Prefecture, Japan.

Iioka was a noted port town in the Edo period, and prospered greatly in the aftermath of the Great Fire of Meireki in 1657, as a transshipment center for timber and building materials to Edo.

Modern Iioka was formed on April 1, 1889. On March 31, 1954, it expanded through annexation of the villages of Sangawa and a part of Toyooka.

On July 1, 2005, Iioka was merged with the city of Asahi, the town of Hikata (from Katori District), and the town of Unakami (also from Kaijō District) to form the new Asahi city, and it disappeared.

In April 2005 (the last data available before its merger into Asahi), the town had an estimated population of 8,042 and a population density of 600 persons per km^{2}. Its total area was 18.27 km^{2}.

== Cultural references ==
- Iioka is the setting for the first film in the classic Japanese blind swordsman series: The Tale of Zatoichi.
