= Hikata, Chiba =

Hikata 干潟町
- Former Town
- Flag Emblem

- Location in Japan
- Coordinates: 35.717°N 140.600°E
- Country: Japan
- Region: Kantō
- Prefecture: Chiba Prefecture
- District: Katori
- Merged: July 1, 2005 (now part of Asahi)

Area
  - Total: 32.44 km^{2} (12.53 sq mi)

Population (April 2005)
  - Total: 8,042
  - Density: 248/km^{2} (640/sq mi)
- Time zone: UTC+09:00 (JST)

Hikata (干潟町, Hikata-machi) was a town located in Katori District, Chiba Prefecture, Japan.

Hikata was formed on April 10, 1954. through the merger of the villages of Kojou, Chuwa, and Manzai.

On July 1, 2005, Hikata was merged with Asahi, Iioka and Unakami (both from Kaijō District) to form the new Asahi city, and it disappeared.

In April 2005 (the last data available before its merger into Asahi), the town had an estimated population of 8,042 and a population density of 248 persons per km^{2}. Its total area was 32.44 km^{2}.
