= Yamada, Chiba =

Yamada 山田町
- Former municipality
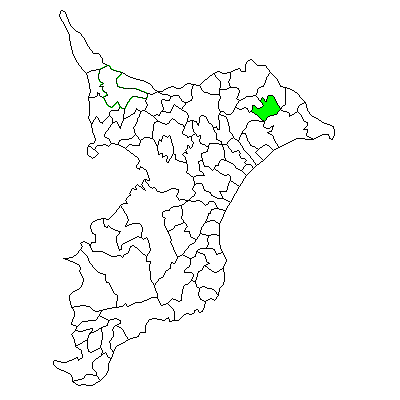
- Location of Yamada in Chiba Prefecture

- Location in Japan
- Coordinates: 35°50′N 140°34′E
- Country: Japan
- Region: Kantō
- Prefecture: Chiba Prefecture
- District: Katori
- Merged: March 27, 2006 (now part of Katori)

Area
  - Total: 51.54 km^{2} (19.90 sq mi)

Population (2003)
  - Total: 11,017
  - Density: 213.75/km^{2} (553.6/sq mi)
- Time zone: UTC+09:00 (JST)
- Symbols
- Flower: Lilium auratum
- Tree: Osmanthus

Yamada (山田町, Yamada-machi) was a town located in Katori District, Chiba Prefecture, Japan.

Yamada Town was established on August 1, 1954 through the merger of town of Fuma with the villages of Yatsu and Yamakura.

On March 27, 2006, Yamada, along with the city of Sawara, and the towns of Kurimoto and Omigawa (both from Katori District), was merged to create the city of Katori, and thus no longer exists as an independent municipality.

In 2003 (the last data available before its merger into Katori), the town had an estimated population of 11,017 and a population density of 213.75 persons per km^{2}. Its total area was 51.54 km^{2}.
