= Unakami, Chiba =

Unakami 海上町
- Former municipality
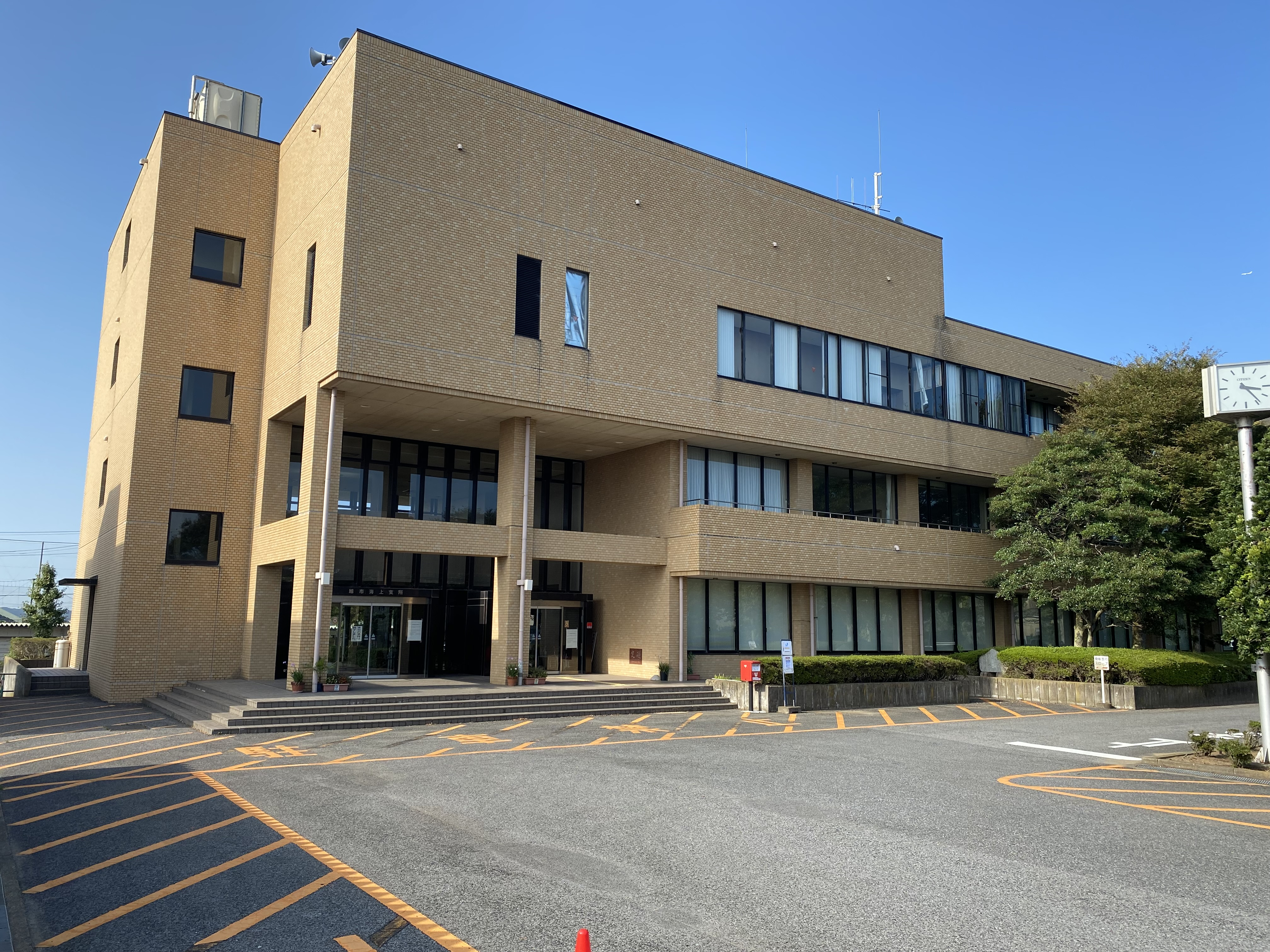
- Former Unakami Town Hall

- Location in Japan
- Coordinates: 35°43′48″N 140°41′42″E
- Country: Japan
- Region: Kantō
- Prefecture: Chiba Prefecture
- District: Kaijō
- Merged: July 1, 2005 (now part of Asahi)

Area
  - Total: 28.59 km^{2} (11.04 sq mi)

Population (April 2005)
  - Total: 11,153
  - Density: 390/km^{2} (1,000/sq mi)
- Time zone: UTC+09:00 (JST)
- Symbols
- Tree: Japanese Pagoda tree

Unakami (海上町, Unakami-machi) was a town located in Kaijō District, Chiba Prefecture, Japan.

Unikami was formed on March 31, 1954. through the merger of the villages of Takisato, Oumei, and Tsurumaki.

On July 1, 2005, Unakami was merged with the city of Asahi, the town of Hikata (from Katori District), and the town of Iioka (also from Kaijō District) to form the new Asahi city, and it disappeared.

In April 2005 (the last data available before its merger into Asahi), the town had an estimated population of 11,153 and a population density of 390 persons per km^{2}. Its total area was 28.59 km^{2}.
