= Shimofusa =

Shimofusa 下総町
- Former municipality
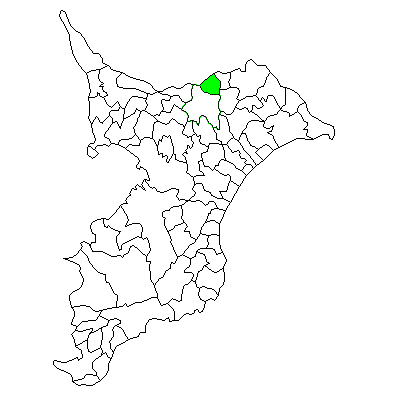
- Location of Shimofusa in Chiba Prefecture

- Location in Japan
- Coordinates: 35°48′36″N 140°30′07″E
- Country: Japan
- Region: Kantō
- Prefecture: Chiba Prefecture
- District: Katori
- Merged: March 27, 2006 (now part of Narita)

Area
  - Total: 32.00 km^{2} (12.36 sq mi)

Population (February 2006)
  - Total: 7,868
  - Density: 246/km^{2} (640/sq mi)
- Time zone: UTC+09:00 (JST)
- Website: Town of Shimofusa
- Symbols
- Bird: Japanese bush-warbler
- Flower: Cosmos
- Tree: Osmanthus

Shimofusa (下総町, Shimofusa-machi) was a town located in Katori District, Chiba Prefecture, Japan.

== History ==
During the Edo period, the area of present-day Shimofusa was part of Takaoka Domain, a minor feudal domain of the Tokugawa shogunate. Modern Namekawa Village was established on April 1, 1889. On February 11, 1955, it merged with the villages of Takaoka and Komikado to form the town of Shimofusa.

On March 27, 2006, Shimofusa, along with the town of Taiei (also from Katori District), was merged into the expanded city of Narita, and thus no longer exists as an independent municipality.

== Population ==
In February 2006, the last data available before its merger into Narita, the town had an estimated population of 7,868 and a population density of 246 square kilometres (95 sq mi). Its total area was 32.00 square kilometres (12.36 sq mi).

== Education ==
Shimofusa High School (千葉県立下総高等学校) is located in the former town.
