= Ryūfuku-ji =

Buddhist temple in Chiba Prefecture, Japan

Ryūfuku-ji 龍福寺
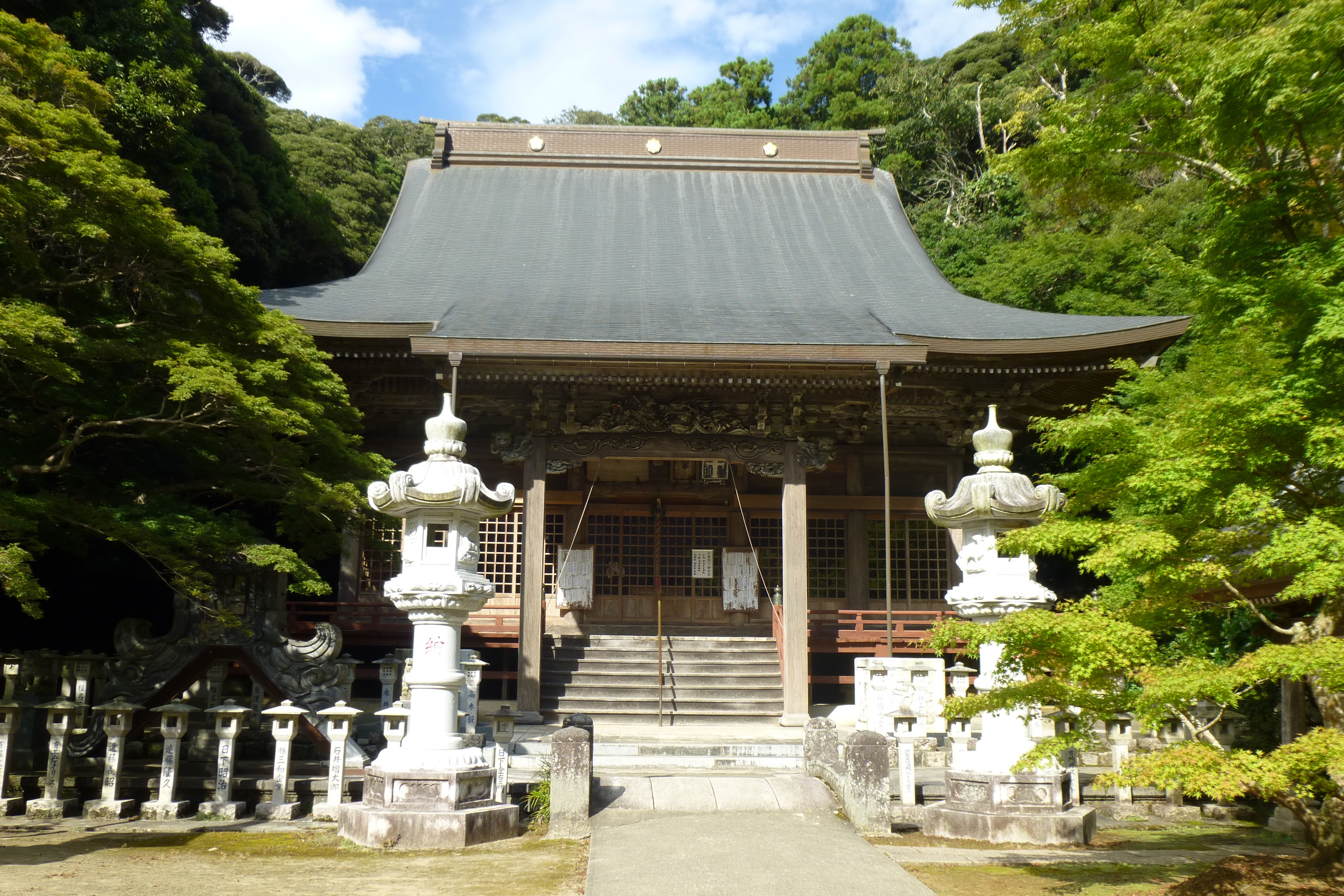

Religion
- Affiliation: Buddhism
- Deity: Fudō Myōō
- Rite: Shingon Chizan Sect

Location
- Location: 120 Iwai, Asahi, Chiba Prefecture
- Country: Japan
- Interactive map of Ryūfuku-ji 龍福寺
- Coordinates: 35.753652°N 140.691386°E

Architecture
- Founder: Kūkai (traditionally)
- Completed: 788 (traditionally)

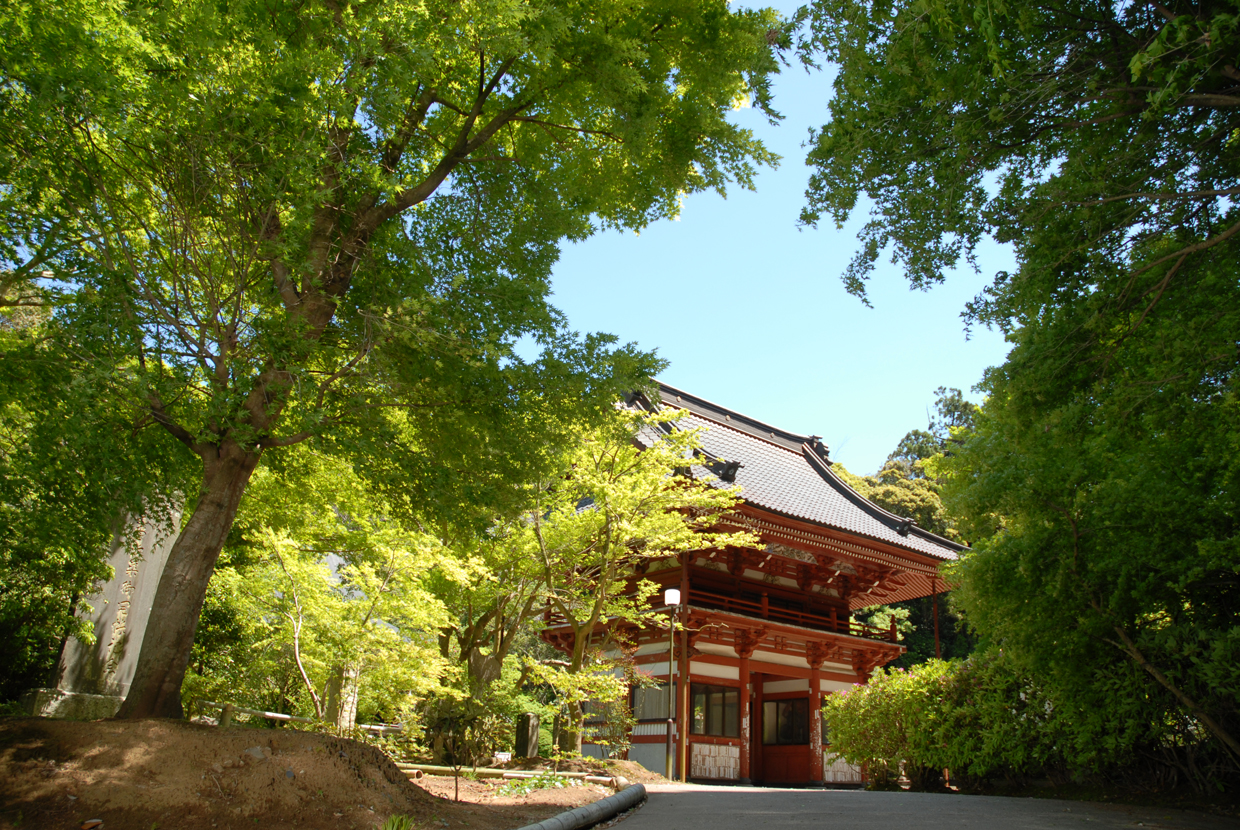
Niōmon gate of Ryūfuku-ji

Ryūfuku-ji (龍福寺) is a Buddhist temple, formally known as Sentakisan Ryūfuku-ji (仙滝山龍福寺), located in the Iwai district of the city of Asahi in Chiba Prefecture, Japan. The temple is also known as the Iwai no Taki Fudō (岩井の滝不動), a reference to a Fudō-myōō statue located under a waterfall on the site.

== Etymology ==
The name of Ryūfuku-ji in the Japanese language is formed from two kanji characters. The first, 龍, means "dragon", and the second, 福 ,means "blessing" or "luck".

== History ==
According to legend, Ryūfuku-ji was founded in the Heian period by the priest Kūkai. By tradition Kūkai carved the statue of Fudō-myōō located in the Hondō of the temple. The Fudō-myōō has adherents among locals of the area and the fisherman of the Kujukuri Coast. In the Sengoku period (1467–1573) the Shimada clan built Mibiro Castle to the south of the temple, but it and the temple were completely destroyed by fire as part of local conflicts during the period.

== Structures ==
- Niōmon gate
- Hondō main hall
- Dainichiden -- Dainichi Nyorai chapel
- Kannon-dō -- Kannon chapel
- Daishi-dō -- Daishi chapel

== Ryūfuku-ji Municipal Forest ==
Ryūfuku-ji is known for its numerous waterfalls, and many of them flow from the slopes surrounding the temple complex. Ryūfuku-ji and its surrounding forest are protected as a nature and wildlife refuse as part of the Ryūfuku-ji Municipal Forest. In late May and June the genjibotaru species of firefly appear around the hondō and waterfalls surrounding the temple. The temple is surrounded by dense vegetation. Notable examples of plant species such as the otakarakō ligularia and the asukainode fern are found throughout the temple complex. The forest has been designated a Prefectural Natural Monument.

== Location ==
Ryūfuku-ji and the Ryūfuku-ji Municipal Forest is in the Iwai District of Asahi, and is located four kilometers north of Iioka Station on the JR East Sōbu Main Line. The temple and municipal forest is accessible by bus from the station.

== See also ==
- The Glossary of Japanese Buddhism for terms concerning Japanese Buddhism, Japanese Buddhist art, and Japanese Buddhist temple architecture.
