= Takaoka Domain =

Japanese domain of the Edo period

Takaoka Domain 高岡藩
- under Tokugawa shogunate Japan
- 1640–1871
- Capital: Takaoka jin'ya
- Government
  - Type: Daimyō
- Historical era: Edo period
  - Established: 1640
  - Disestablished: 1871
- Today part of: part of Chiba Prefecture

Takaoka Domain (高岡藩, Takaoka han) was a Japanese domain of the Edo period, located in Shimōsa Province (the northern portion of modern-day Chiba Prefecture), Japan. It was centered on Takaoka jin'ya in what is now the city of Narita, Chiba and town of Shimofusa, Chiba.

== History ==
Takaoka Domain was founded for Inoue Masashige, a close retainer of Tokugawa Hidetada and Tokugawa Iemitsu, who rose to prominence after the Osaka Summer Campaign. He subsequently served as a metsuke, and played an important role in the persecution and eradication of Kirishitan religion from Japan. After the suppression of the Shimabara Rebellion, he was raised to the status of a 10,000 koku daimyō and assigned the newly formed Takaoka Domain.

However, Masashige never actually visited his domains, dividing his time between Edo and Nagasaki on official duties, and his revenues were increased to 13,000 koku in 1644. His son, Inoue Masakiyo likewise spent his time in Edo, but giving up 1500 koku in revenue to his younger his brothers. Inoue Masaakira was the first daimyō of Takaoka to actually live within the domain. He also surrendered 1500 koku to his younger brothers, leaving the domain at the 10,000 koku level.

During the Boshin War, the domain quickly supported the Satchō Alliance. After the Battle of Ueno, the final daimyō of Takaoka, Inoue Masanori, submitted to the Meiji government. He was appointed domain governor under the new administration, until the abolition of the han system in July 1871 and subsequently served in the police forces of the new government and became a viscount under the kazoku peerage. The former Takaoka Domain was absorbed into the new Chiba Prefecture.

== Holdings at the end of the Edo period ==
As with most domains in the han system, Takaoka Domain consisted of several discontinuous territories calculated to provide the assigned kokudaka, based on periodic cadastral surveys and projected agricultural yields.

- Shimōsa Province
  - 1 village in Imba District
  - 11 villages in Katori District
  - 11 villages in Sōma District
- Kazusa Province
  - 10 villages in Ichihara District
  - 1 village in Kamihabu District
  - 2 villages in Yamabe District
  - 2 villages in Musha District

== List of daimyō ==
- Inoue clan (fudai) 1640-1971

#	Name	Tenure	Courtesy title	Court Rank	revenues
1	Inoue Masashige (井上 政重)	1640–1660	Chikugo-no-kami (筑後守)	Lower 5th (従五位下)	10,000-->13,000 koku
2	Inoue Masakiyo (井上政清)	1660–1675	Chikugo-no-kami (筑後守)	Lower 5th (従五位下)	13,000->11,500 koku
3	Inoue Masaakira (井上政蔽)	1675–1716	Chikugo-no-kami (筑後守)	Lower 5th (従五位下)	13,000->10,000 koku
4	Inoue Masachika (井上政鄰)	1716–1731	Chikugo-no-kami (筑後守)	Lower 5th (従五位下)	10,000 koku
5	Inoue Masamori (井上正森)	1731–1760	Yamashiro-no-kami (山城守)	Lower 5th (従五位下)	10,000 koku
6	Inoue Masakuni (井上正国)	1760–1791	Chikugo-no-kami (筑後守)	Lower 5th (従五位下)	10,000 koku
7	Inoue Masanori (井上正紀)	1791–1806	Iki-no-kami (壱岐守)	Lower 5th (従五位下)	10,000 koku
8	Inoue Masataki (井上正瀧)	1806–1841	Chikugo-no-kami (筑後守)	Lower 5th (従五位下)	10,000 koku
9	Inoue Masamura (井上正域)	1841–1846	Chikugo-no-kami (筑後守)	Lower 5th (従五位下)	10,000 koku
10	Inoue Masayoshi (井上正和)	1846–1867	Chikugo-no-kami (筑後守)	Lower 5th (従五位下)	10,000 koku
11	Inoue Masayori (井上正順)	1867–1871	Kunai-shōyujō (宮内少輔)	Lower 5th (従五位下)	10,000 koku
