= Inoue Masashige =

Japanese daimyō

Inoue Masashige (井上 政重; 1585 – 27 March 1661) was an important figure during the early Edo period in Japan. As the daimyō of Takaoka Domain, he played a key role in the persecution of early Christians in Japan during the establishment of sakoku, which forbade foreign persons and influences within Japanese borders.

Masashige later rose to prominence by his selection as a commissioner for the Dutch East India Company in Nagasaki, designated as the sole port in Japan where foreign traders were permitted to conduct their business under strict oversight. In his post of Inspector General (ōmetsuke, 大目付), Masashige had many encounters with European officials and merchants, who recorded much about him.

Inoue was portrayed by Issey Ogata in Martin Scorsese’s film Silence (2016).
