= Asahi, Chiba =

Asahi 旭市
- City
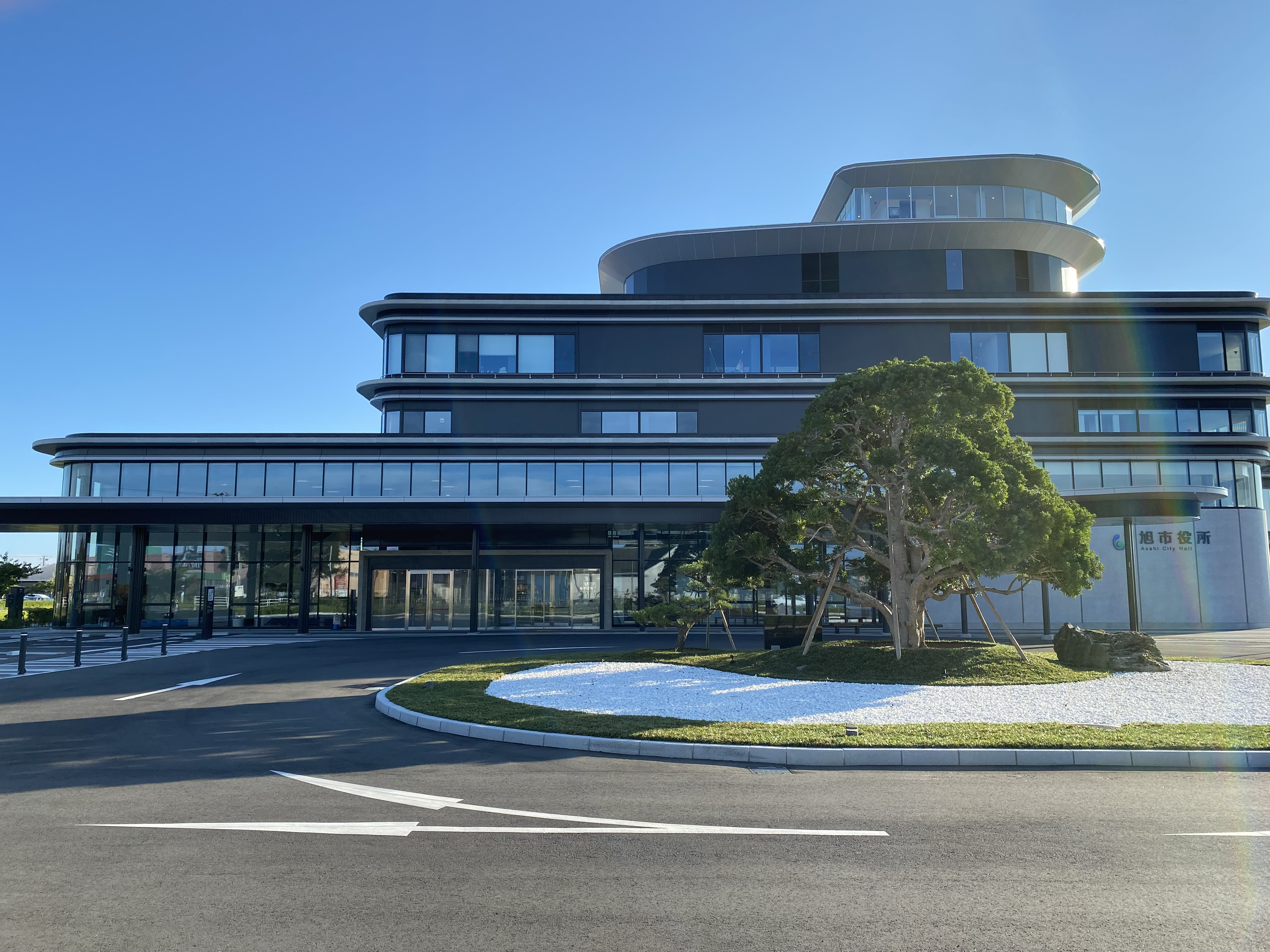
- Asahi City Hall

- Flag Emblem

- Location of Asahi in Chiba Prefecture

- Coordinates: 35°43′N 140°39′E
- Country: Japan
- Region: Kantō
- Prefecture: Chiba

Government
  - Mayor: Yaichiro Yonemoto(since 31 July 2021)

Area
  - Total: 129.91 km^{2} (50.16 sq mi)

Population (December 1, 2020)
  - Total: 64,690
  - Density: 498.0/km^{2} (1,290/sq mi)
- Time zone: UTC+9 (Japan Standard Time)
- -Tree: Japanese Black Pine
- Flower: hydrangea
- Phone number: 0479-62-1212
- Address: 2132 Banchi, Ni, Asahi-shi, Chiba-ken 289-2595
- Website: Official website

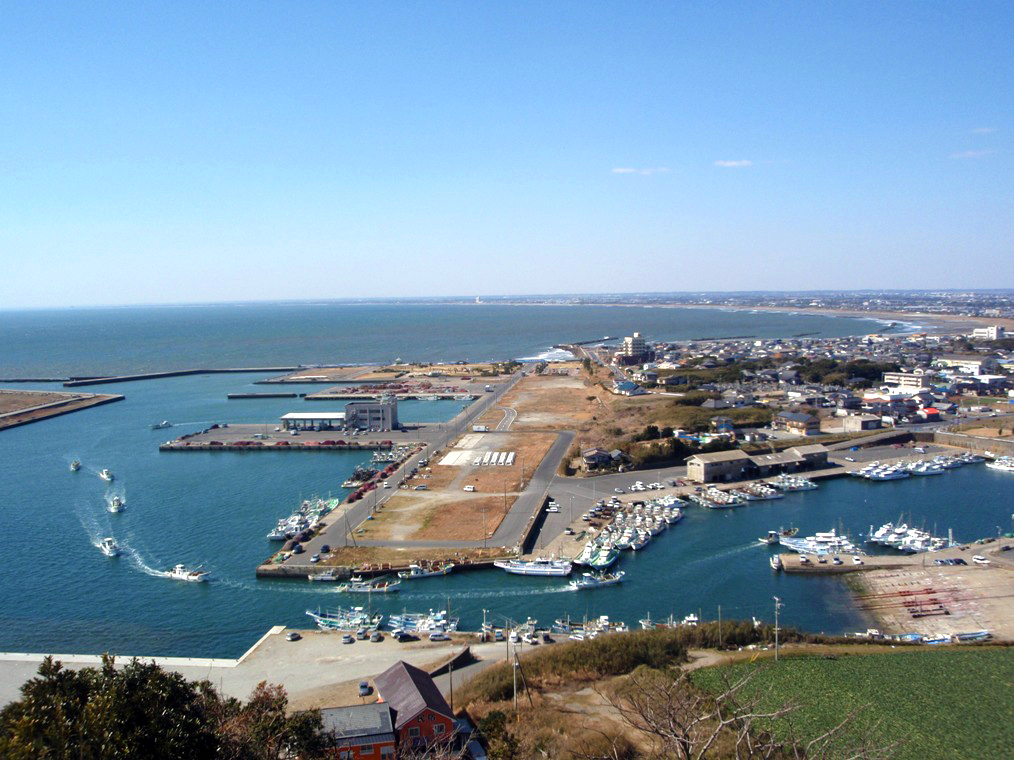
Iioka Fishing Port

Asahi (旭市, Asahi-shi; Japanese pronunciation: [ä́.sä̀.çì, ä̀.sä́.çi̥.ɕì]) is a city located in Chiba Prefecture, Japan. As of 1 December 2020, the city had an estimated population of 64,690 in 26,510 households and a population density of 500 persons per km^{2}. The total area of the city is 129.91 square kilometres (50.16 sq mi).

== History ==
The Chiba clan, or branches of it, ruled the Shimōsa region for about 400 years from the Kamakura period. During the Sengoku period, the Chiba clan gained the protection of such powerful clans as the Odawara Hōjō clan, allowing them to get a stronger foothold over the area. They lost control when the Hōjō clan was overthrown in 1590 by Toyotomi Hideyoshi. After that, General Kiso Yoshimasa settled in the region. He restored the Ajito Castle, which was the inspiration for the name "Asahi." When poet Nonoguchi Takamasa visited the area in 1852, he wrote a poem about the general, from which the name "Asahi," which can mean "rising sun," was taken:

"from Shinano / adoring the rising sun / he came to the eastern land / and there remains the evidence of his earthly life"

In the Edo period, various agricultural changes in the region occurred. The first was the reclamation of the "Sea of Camellias", a vast lake, which was drained into the Pacific Ocean to create the fertile Higata Hachiman-goku. The second was spurred on by the arrival of agrarian scholar Ohara Yugaku in 1835 and other kokugaku scholars who helped to revive agriculture in the area. During this same time, while Iioka Sukegoro was helping to develop the fishing industry, fishermen from the Kansai region moved to the area to take advantage of the bountiful fishing grounds available.

The town of Asahi was established with the creation of the modern municipalities system on April 1, 1889. It was raised to city status on July 1, 1954. On July 1, 2005, the city of Asahi, the town of Hikata (from Katori District), and the towns of Iioka and Unakami (both from Kaijo District) merged on equal terms to form the new Asahi city.

In March 2011, the city was greatly affected by 9.0 magnitude earthquake, tsunami, and subsequent nuclear disaster. Around 15 people were killed, 2,265 buildings were damaged, with 427 buildings destroyed, 716 people were left homeless, and heavy damage was done to the town's port and fishing boat fleet following the triple disaster.

== Geography ==
Asahi is located in far northeastern Chiba Prefecture, approximately 50 kilometers from the prefectural capital at Chiba and 80 to 90 kilometers from central Tokyo. Located at the northern end of the Kujukuri Plain, the southern part faces Kujukuri Beach and the Pacific Ocean, and the Shimōsa Plateau extends to the northern part.

=== Surrounding municipalities ===
Chiba Prefecture

- Chōshi
- Katori
- Sōsa
- Tōnoshō

=== Climate ===
Asahi has a humid subtropical climate (Köppen Cfa) characterized by warm summers and cool winters with light to no snowfall. The average annual temperature in Asahi is 15.0 °C. The average annual rainfall is 1559 mm with September as the wettest month. The temperatures are highest on average in August, at around 25.8 °C, and lowest in January, at around 5.2 °C.

== Demographics ==
Per Japanese census data, the population of Asahi has remained relatively steady over the past 70 years.

Historical population
Year	Pop.	±%
1920	45,595	—
1930	48,776	+7.0%
1940	51,473	+5.5%
1950	66,204	+28.6%
1960	64,226	−3.0%
1970	61,136	−4.8%
1980	65,405	+7.0%
1990	69,800	+6.7%
2000	71,176	+2.0%
2010	69,058	−3.0%
2020	63,745	−7.7%

== Government ==
Asahi has a mayor-council form of government with a directly elected mayor and a unicameral city council of 20 members. Asahi contributes one member to the Chiba Prefectural Assembly. In terms of national politics, the city is part of Chiba 10th district of the lower house of the Diet of Japan.

== Economy ==
The local economy is dominated by commercial fishing, agricultural and seasonal tourism to its beach resorts.

=== Agriculture ===
Asahi City's agricultural output is ranked first in Chiba Prefecture and ninth in Japan. The city's location on the coast of the Bōsō Peninsula gives it easy access to abundant fishing grounds created by the intersection of the Japan Current and the Okhotsk Current. Iioka fishing port has the second highest volume of fish unloaded in Chiba Prefecture.

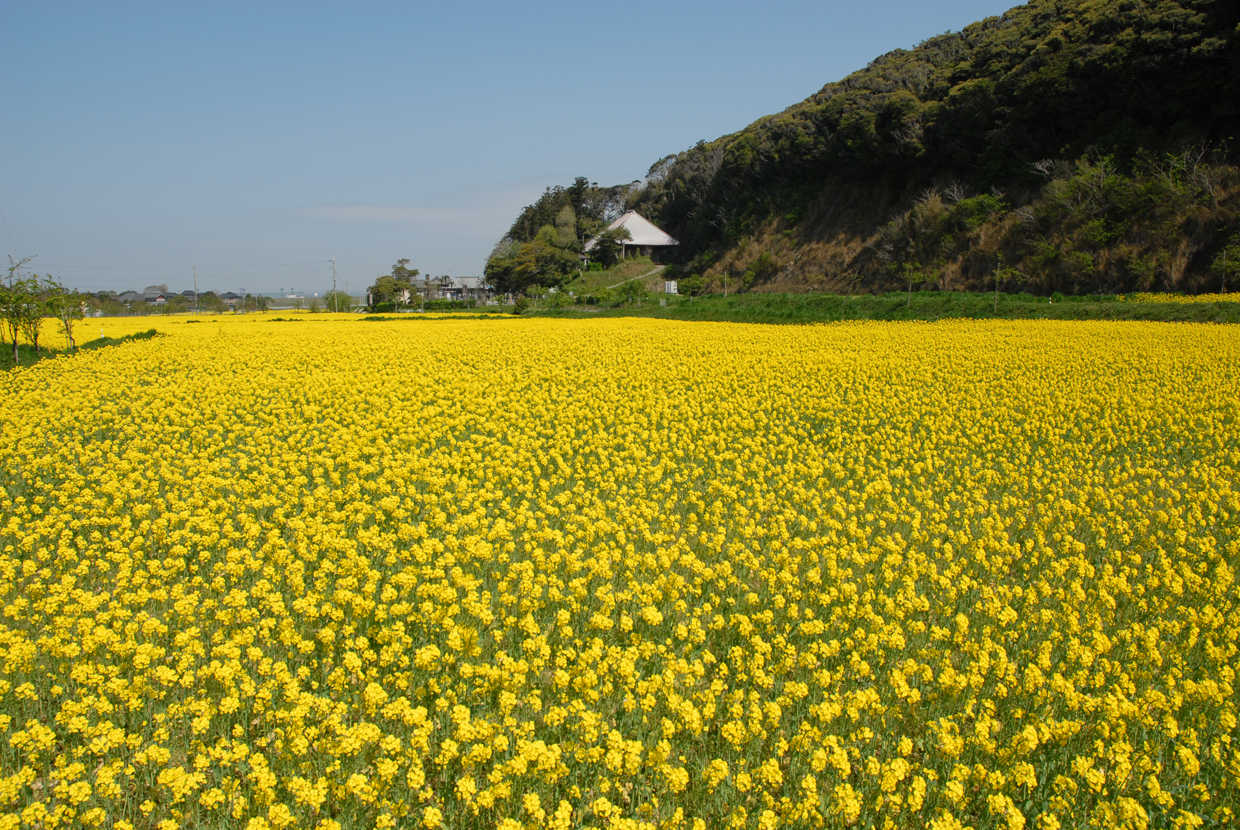
A field of Asahi rapeseed flowers

=== Flowers ===
- Cyclamens
- Garland Chrysanthemum
- Petunia
- Rapeseed
- Transvaal (Bellis perennis)

=== Fruits, vegetables, and grains ===
- Cherry tomatoes
- Cucumbers (including heart-shaped and star-shaped)
- Mushrooms
- Oriental pickling melon
- Parsley
- Rice
- Slender green peppers
- Strawberries
- Takami Melons
- Tomatoes
- Zucchini

=== Seafood and meat ===
- Flounder
- Infant Anchovies
- Inshore Oysters
- Pork
- Sardines

== Education ==
Asahi has 15 public elementary schools and five public middle schools operated by the city government, and two public high schools operated by the Chiba Prefectural Board of Education.

=== High schools ===
- Chiba Prefectural Asahi Agricultural High School
- Chiba Prefectural Toso Technological High School

=== Junior high schools ===
- Daiichi Public Junior High School
- Daini Public Junior High School
- Hikata Public Junior High School
- Iioka Public Junior High School
- Unakami Public Junior High School

=== Elementary schools ===
- Chuou Public Elementary School
- Chuwa Public Elementary School
- Higata Public Elementary School
- Iioka Public Elementary School
- Kojou Public Elementary School
- Kotoda Public Elementary School
- Kyouwa Public Elementary School
- Manzai Public Elementary School
- Oumei Public Elementary School
- Sangawa Public Elementary School
- Takisato Public Elementary School
- Tomiura Public Elementary School
- Toyohata Public Elementary School
- Tsurumaki Public Elementary School
- Yasashi Public Elementary School

== Transportation ==
=== Railways ===
JR East – Sōbu Main Line

- Higata - Asahi - Iioka - Kurahashi

The Shiosai Limited Express service stops at Asahi and Iioka stations.

=== Highways ===
- National Route 126

== City landmarks ==
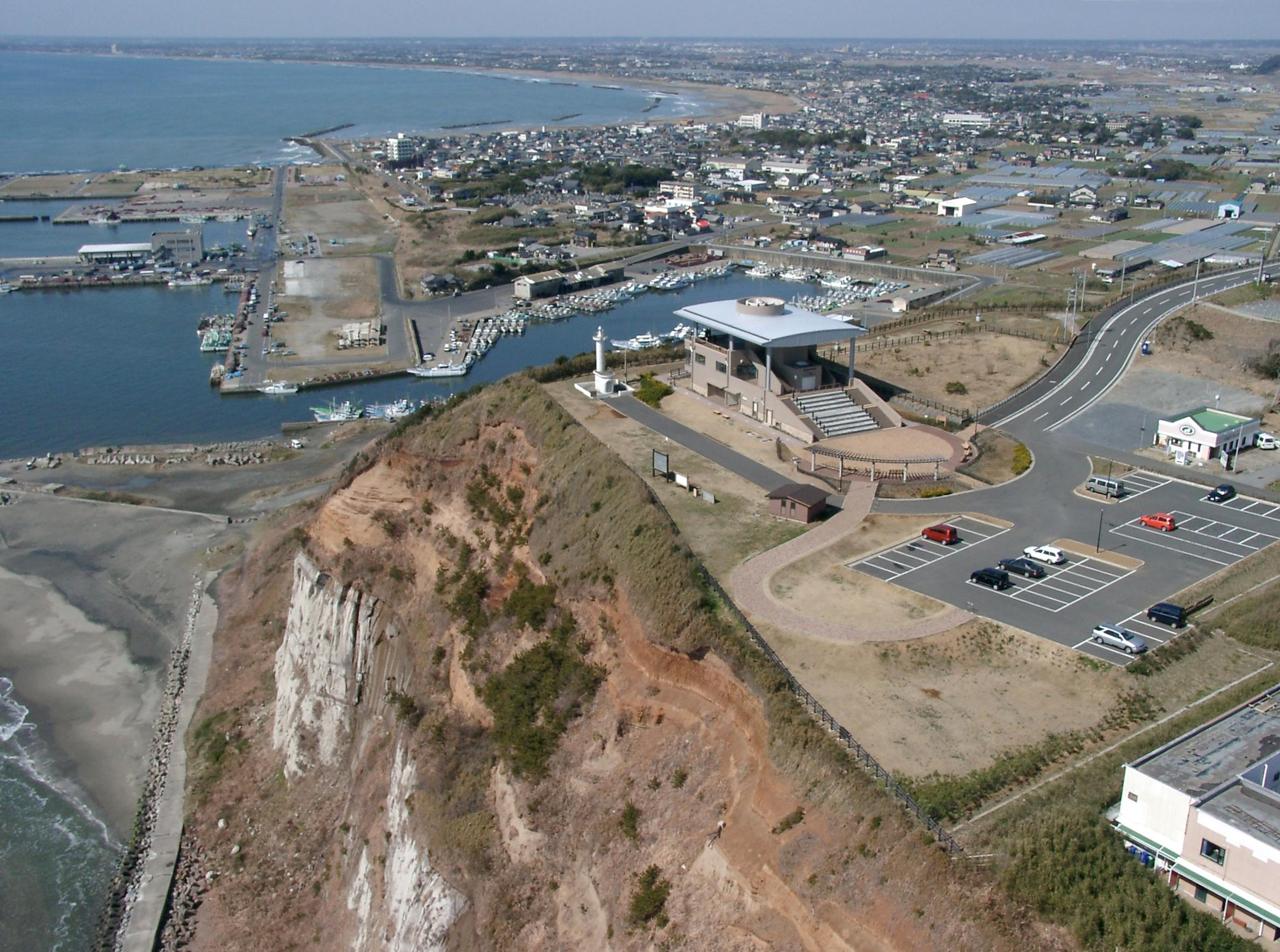
Iioka Gyobu Misaki Observatory and Lighthouse

=== Administered by Chiba Prefecture ===
- Chiba East Prefectural Library
- General Sports Center, Toso Stadium
- Iioka Gyobu Misaki Observatory and Lighthouse
- Toso Culture Center

=== Administered by Asahi City ===
- Asahi Chuo Hospital
- Asahi City Public Library
- Asahi Sports-no-Mori Park
- Asahi Park Golf Course
- Fukuro Park
- Iioka swimming area
- Manzai Nature Park
- Ohara Yugaku Memorial Hall and Historical Park
- Taki-no-Sato Nature Park
- Unakami Camp Park
- Unakami Community Athletic Park
- Yasashigaura swimming area (nicknamed "The Mecca of Surfing")

=== Temples and shrines ===
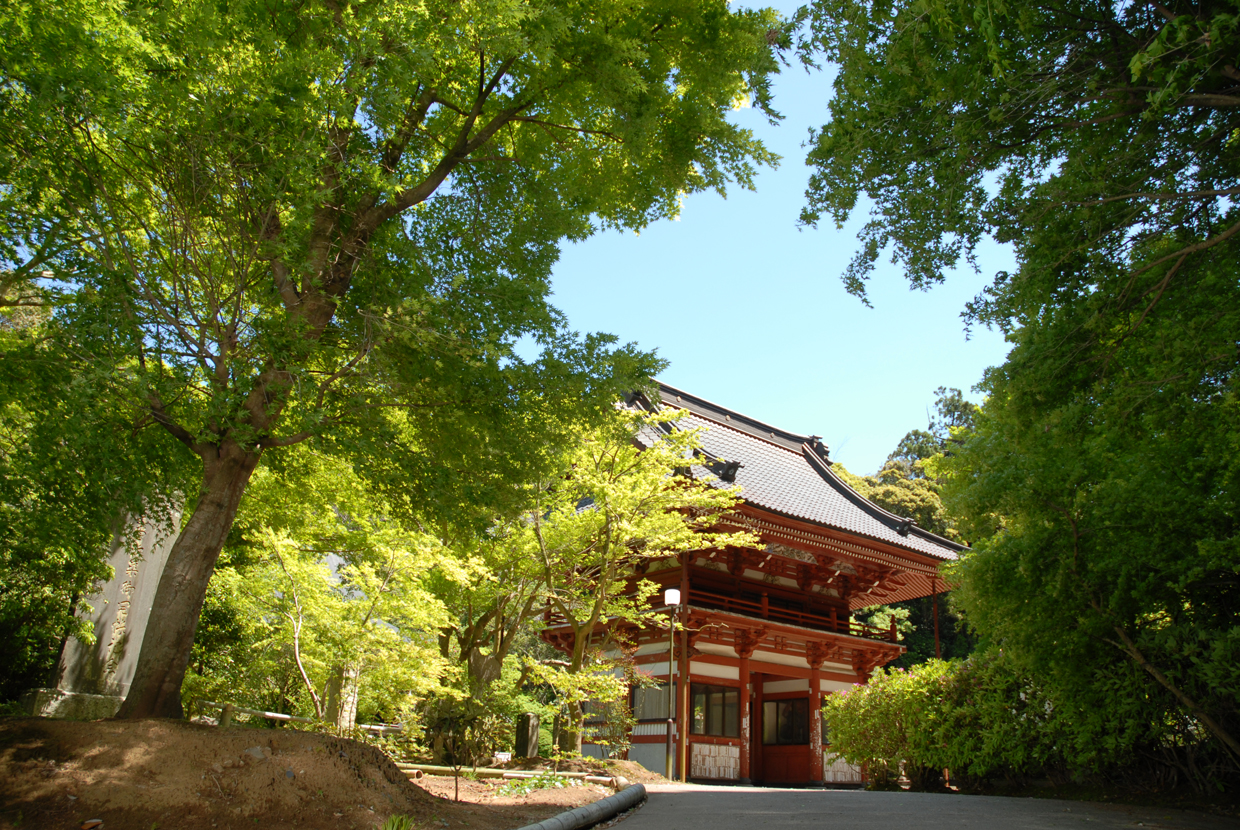
Ryufuku-ji Temple

- Kamakazu Ise Daijin-gū
- Kumano Shrine
- Rai Shrine
- Ryūfuku-ji
- Tamasaki Shrine

=== Other ===
- Kampo no Yado hotel and hot springs (run by Japan Post Holdings)

== Events ==
=== Annual ===
- Iioka Shiosai Marathon – first Sunday of February
- Fukuro Park Cherry Blossom Festival - April 1 - May 5
- Asahi Iioka Port / Seafood Festival - end of May
- Iioka Fireworks Festival – last Saturday of July
- Iioka "YOU You" Festival – last Saturday and Sunday of July
- Summer Fest at Yasashigaura - beginning of August
- Citizens' Tanabata Festival – August 6 and 7
- Asahi Beach Sand Sculpture displays
- Hebizono-deshimizu Cosmos Festival - beginning of October
- Ikiiki Asahi Citizens' Festival - middle of October
- Hikata Furusato Festival - middle of November
- Unakami Industry Festival - end of November

=== Other ===
- 2010 National Sports Festival of Japan Table Tennis tournament (Held at Sports-no-Mori Park from September 30 to October 4)
- Goshinkosai Festival at Kumano Shrine (held every 12 years)
- Goshinkosai Festival at Dairi Shrine (held every 33 years)
- Miroku-sanbaso procession of Kurahashi (held every 20 years)

== Sister cities ==
- (Japan) Chino, Nagano Prefecture, sister city
- (Japan) Nakagusuku, Okinawa Prefecture, friendship city

== Mascots ==
Asahi City uses characters from Tetsuya Chiba's manga works as official mascots, including Mukai Taiyo from "Ashita Tenki ni Naare" as the mascot of Asahi Park Golf Course. Framed art and messages from Tetsuya Chiba can be seen in many public buildings. Tetsuya Chiba lived in Asahi (then Iioka-machi) during his childhood.

== Noted people from Asahi ==
- Noriko Arai, Paralympic athlete
- Hiromichi Ishige, professional baseball player
- Shoya Tomizawa, professional motorcycle racer
