= Kurimoto, Chiba =

Kurimoto 栗源町
- Former municipality
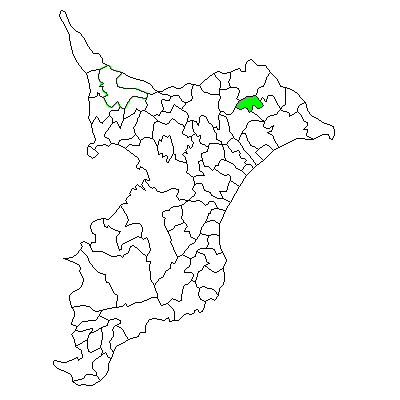
- Location of Kurimoto in Chiba Prefecture

- Location in Japan
- Coordinates: 35°48′36″N 140°30′07″E
- Country: Japan
- Region: Kantō
- Prefecture: Chiba Prefecture
- District: Katori
- Merged: March 27, 2006 (now part of Katori)

Area
  - Total: 29.05 km^{2} (11.22 sq mi)

Population (April 1, 2005)
  - Total: 5,179
  - Density: 178/km^{2} (460/sq mi)
- Time zone: UTC+09:00 (JST)
- Symbols
- Tree: Satsuki azalea

Kurimoto (栗源町, Kurimoto-machi) was a town located in Katori District, Chiba Prefecture, Japan.

Kurimoto Village was established on April 1, 1889. It was raised to town status on April 10, 1924.

On March 27, 2006, Kurimoto, along with the city of Sawara, and the towns of Omigawa and Yamada (both from Katori District), was merged to create the city of Katori, and thus no longer exists as an independent municipality.

In November 2005 (the last data available before its merger into Katori), the town had an estimated population of 5,179 and a population density of 178 persons per km^{2}. Its total area was 29.05 km^{2}.
