= Sawara, Chiba =

Sawara 佐原市
- Former City
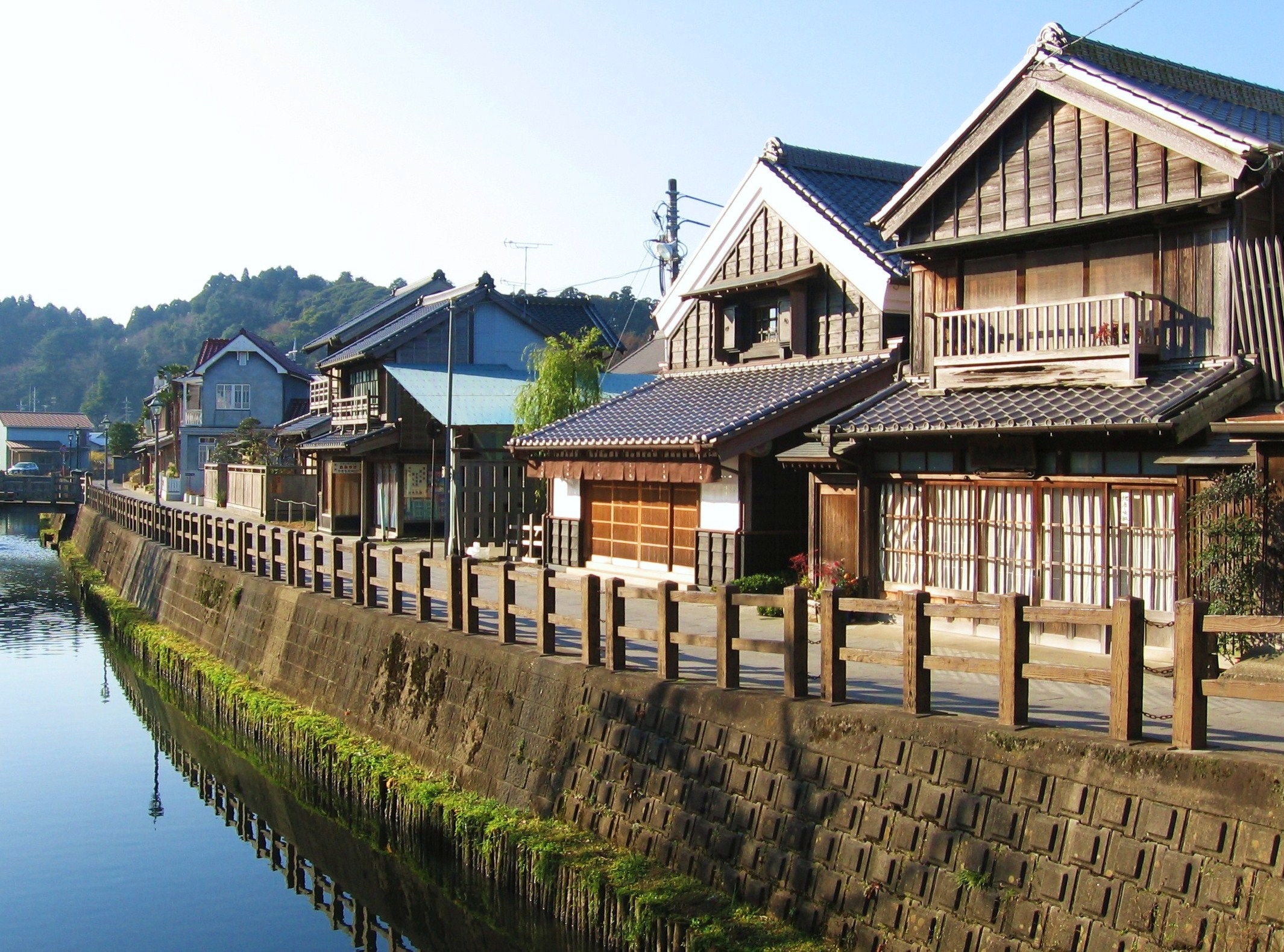
- Sawara canal and historical district

- Flag Seal

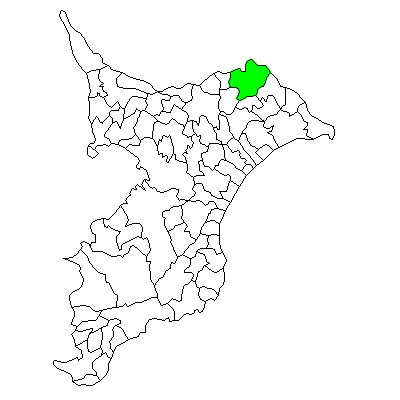
- Location of Sawara in Chiba Prefecture

- Location in Japan
- Coordinates: 35.883°N 140.500°E
- Country: Japan
- Region: Kantō
- Prefecture: Chiba Prefecture
- District: Katori
- Merged: March 27, 2006 (now part of Katori)

Area
  - Total: 119.88 km^{2} (46.29 sq mi)

Population (February 1, 2005)
  - Total: 47,244
  - Density: 394/km^{2} (1,020/sq mi)
- Time zone: UTC+09:00 (JST)
- Symbols
- Flower: Siberian Iris
- Tree: Populus

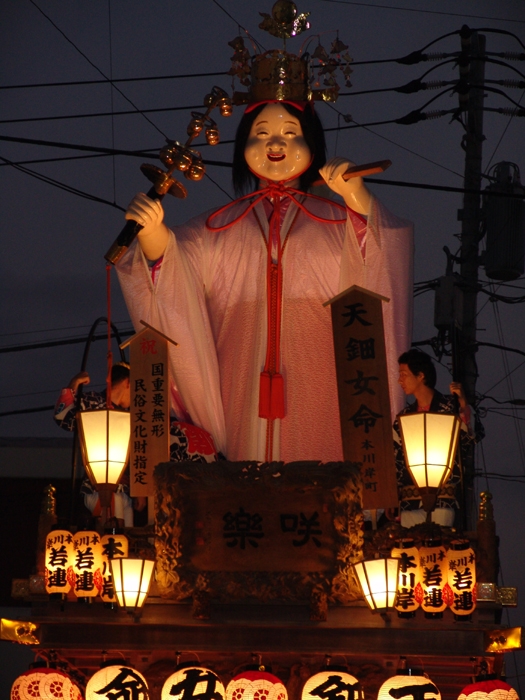
Biannual Sawara Matsuri Festival

Sawara (佐原市, Sawara-shi) was a city located in Katori District, Chiba Prefecture, Japan.

== History ==
Sawara has been settled since prehistoric times, and has numerous remains of Jōmon period shell middens and Kofun period burial mounds. By the Nara period, it had developed as a port, and as a monzenmachi associated with Katori Shrine, and in the Heian period was a regional commerce center for numerous shōen in the area. During the Edo period, it was partly under the control of the Omigawa Domain, a feudal domain of the Tokugawa shogunate. Modern Sawara Town was created in 1889. Sawara-city established on March 15, 1951 through merger with neighboring town of Katori and the villages of Kasai and Higashi-Oto. It expanded further on February 11, 1955 through annexation of the neighboring villages of Mizuho, Shinshima, Tsunomiya and Okura.

In March 1996, Sawara established sister city relations with Nanjing in China.

In February 2006 (the last data available before its merger into Katori), the city had an estimated population of 47,244 and a population density of 394 persons per km^{2}. Its total area was 119.88 km^{2}.

On March 27, 2006, Sawara, along with the towns of Kurimoyo, Omigawa and Yamada (all from Katori District), was merged to create the city of Katori, and thus no longer exists as an independent municipality.

== Points of interest ==
- Sawara Municipal Aquatic Botanical Garden
- Sawara's town center, which is an old Japanese merchant town, with historical canal.
- Waterfall bridge - a waterfall falls from this bridge at specific times during the day
- Katori City Hall is located in Sawara, next to Highway 356

== See also ==
- Groups of Traditional Buildings
