= Katori District =

District in Chiba prefecture, Japan

Coordinates: 35°46′48″N 140°28′41″E

Location of Katori District in Chiba Prefecture

Katori District (香取郡, Katori-gun) is a district located in Chiba Prefecture, Japan. The district dates back to the Taika Reform in the 7th century, and Katori District remained part of Shimōsa Province until the establishment of Chiba Prefecture. Historically Katori District occupied the area south of the lower researches of the Tone River.

Since there is no population data since 2003, the post-Katori-Narita district had an estimated population of 40,260. The total area was 138.69 kilometres (86.18 mi).

== Towns and villages ==
- Kōzaki
- Tako
- Tōnoshō

== District Timeline ==
- July 1, 2005 - The town of Hikata merged with the towns of Iioka and Unakami from Kaijō District (now dissolved) and the city of Asahi to form the city of Asahi.
- March 27, 2006
  - The city of Sawara and the towns of Omigawa, Yamada and Kurimoto merged to form the new city of Katori.
  - The towns of Shimofusa and Taiei merged into the city of Narita.
