= Omigawa, Chiba =

Omigawa 小見川町
- Former municipality
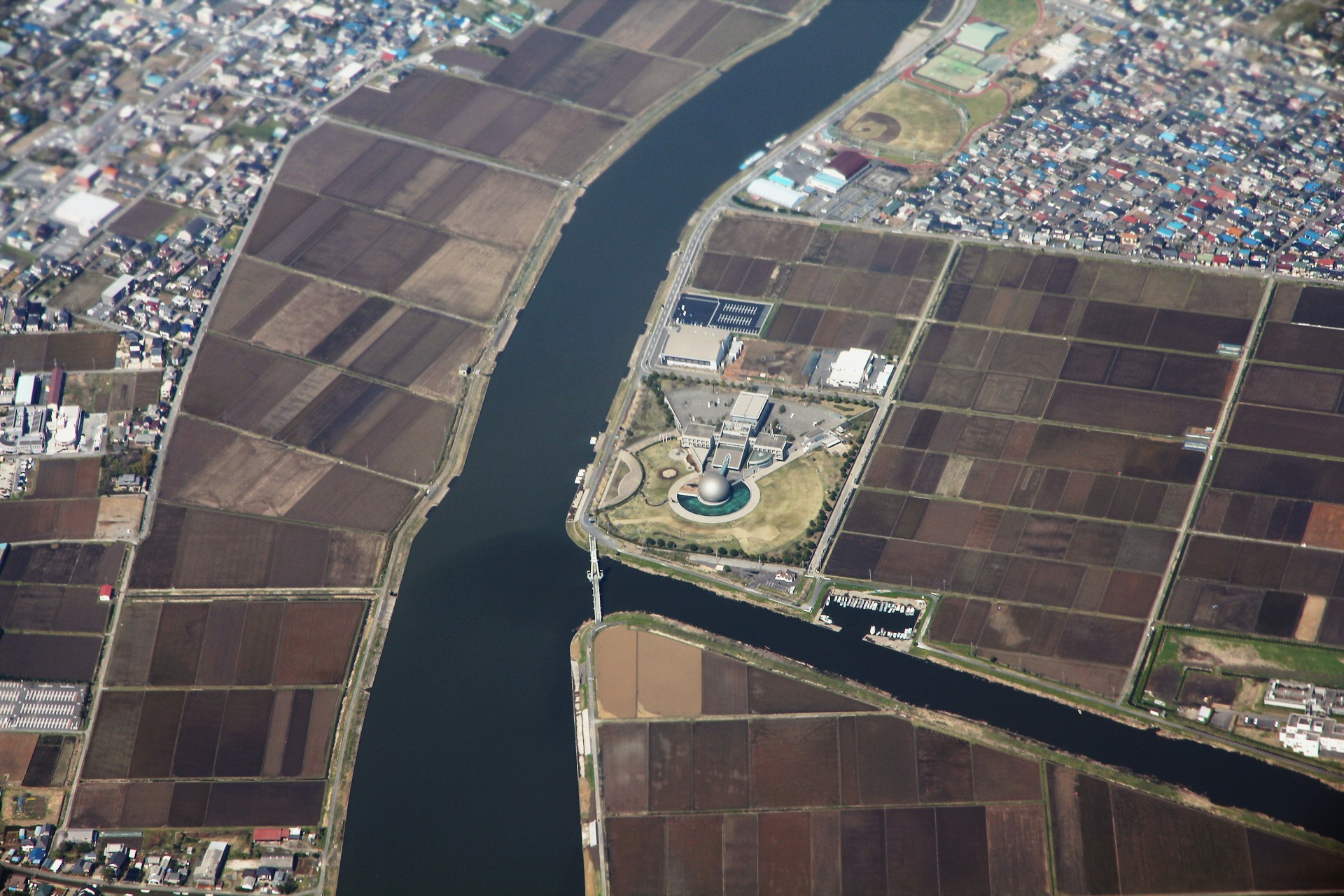
- Tone River in Omigawa

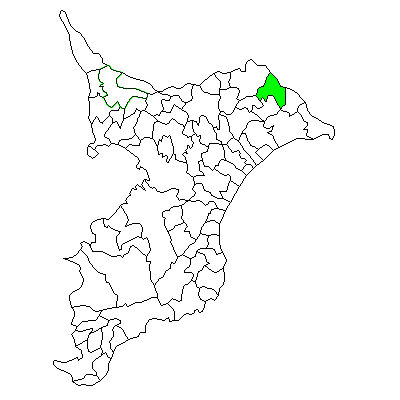
- Location of Omigawa in Chiba Prefecture

- Location in Japan
- Coordinates: 35°51′N 140°37′E
- Country: Japan
- Region: Kantō
- Prefecture: Chiba Prefecture
- District: Katori
- Merged: March 27, 2006 (now part of Katori)

Area
  - Total: 61.84 km^{2} (23.88 sq mi)

Population (April 1, 2005)
  - Total: 25,420
  - Density: 411/km^{2} (1,060/sq mi)
- Time zone: UTC+09:00 (JST)
- Symbols
- Bird: Old World flycatcher
- Flower: Japanese iris
- Tree: Juniperus chinensis

Omigawa (小見川町, Omigawa-machi) was a town located in Katori District, Chiba Prefecture, Japan.

== Population ==
In November 2005 (the last data available before its merger into Katori), the town had an estimated population of 25,420 and a population density of 411 persons per km^{2}. Its total area was 61.84 km^{2}.

== History ==
Omigawa has been settled since prehistoric times, with numerous shell middens and burial mounds from the Japanese Paleolithic through Kofun period. During the Edo period, it was the center of Omigawa Domain, a feudal domain of the Tokugawa shogunate. Modern Omigawa Town was created in the early Meiji period.

== Merge ==
On March 27, 2006, Omigawa, along with the city of Sawara, and the towns of Kurimoto and Yamada (both from Katori District), was merged to create the city of Katori, and thus no longer exists as an independent municipality.
