= Kaijō District, Chiba =

Former district in Chiba Prefecture, Japan

Kaijō (海上郡, Kaijō-gun) was a district located in Chiba Prefecture, Japan.

As of 2003, the district had an estimated population of 21,982 and a density of 469.10 persons per km^{2}. The total area was 46.86 km^{2}.

Until the day before the district dissolved (June 30, 2005), the district had two towns:

- Iioka
- Unakami

On July 1, 2005, Iioka and Unakami were merged with the town of Hikata (from Katori District), and the old city of Asahi to create the new and expanded city of Asahi. Kaijō District was dissolved as a result of this merger.

== District Timeline ==
- July 1, 2005 - the towns of Iioka and Unakami were merged with the town of Hikata (from Katori District), and the old city of Asahi to create the new and expanded city of Asahi. Kaijō District was dissolved as a result of this merger.
