= Fusa Province =

Former province of Japan

Fusa Province 総国 or 捄国
- Province of Japan
- 7th century
Succeeded by
Shimōsa Province
Kazusa Province
Awa Province (Chiba)
- Today part of: Chiba Prefecture and Ibaraki Prefecture.

Fusa Province (総国 or 捄国, Fusa no kuni) was an ancient province of Japan, in the area of Shimōsa ("Lower Fusa") and Kazusa ("Upper Fusa") provinces. At the time of the establishment of Kazusa Province, it also included the southern tip of the Bōsō Peninsula that would later be split off as Awa Province. The ambit of this ancient entity is within Chiba Prefecture and Ibaraki Prefecture. It was sometimes called Sōshū (総州).

== Geography ==
It was bordered by Hitachi Province to the north, Shimotsuke Province al northwest, Musashi Province and Tokyo Bay to the west, and Pacific Ocean to the east.

== History ==
6,000 years ago much of the plain was covered by the sea, Katori Sea and Kujūkuri Beach. Shell and funerary tumulus were deposited at relatively high altitudes beside the Shimōsa Plateau. Canoes excavated in the tumulus, indicates that there was activity during the Jōmon period.

After thousands of years the land rises and the sea recedes, and in Yayoi period and Kofun period much of the area was covered by wetlands, lakes and ponds. The cultivation of rice was transmitted from the south of the country, and people planted rice in the wetlands, and they lived from agriculture and fishing. Subsequently hemp of good quality was planted and then the area was known as the "Country of hemp" (Fusa no kuni), to later be divided into two provinces. The hemp was cultivated to make clothes.

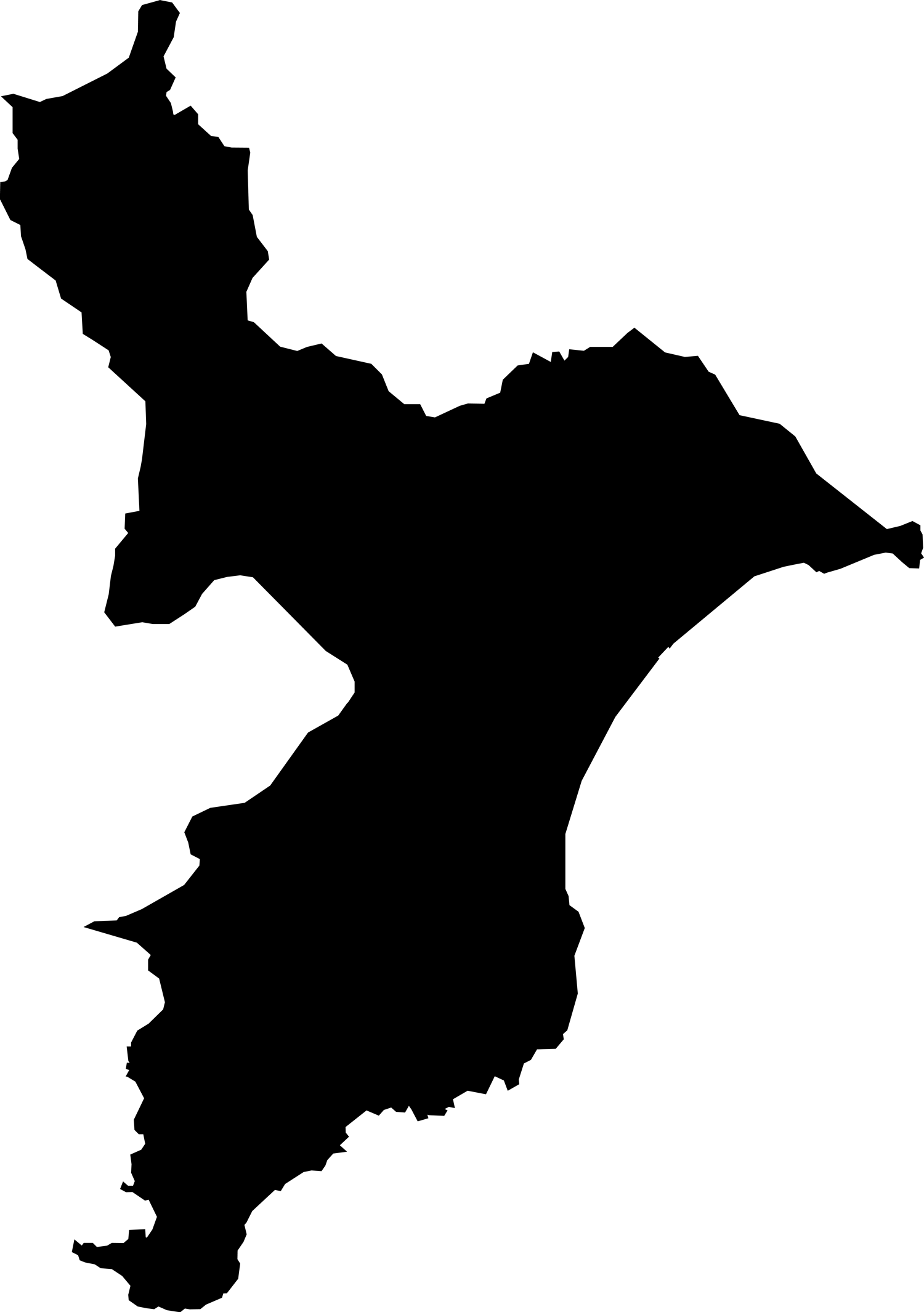
Fusa Province, Shimōsa in the north, Kazusa in the center and Awa in the south.

Fusa was originally a territory known as Fusa Province (総国, occasionally 捄国, Fusa-no-kuni), which was divided into "lower" and "upper" portions (i.e. Shimōsa and Kazusa) during the reign of Emperor Kōtoku (645–654).

In the first half of the 8th century, the southern part of the Kazusa province was divided into the Awa Province. On 718 the district of Awa was elevated into status to a full province, on 741 it was merged back into Kazusa, but regained its independent status in 757.

- Fusa
  - Shimōsa
  - Kazusa
    - Awa

=== Toponymy ===
Although Fusa Province has been divided into Shimōsa and Kazusa since ancient times, a toponym Fusa has survived into modern times as the name of a village (布佐村 Fusa-mura), later a town (布佐町 Fusa-machi), which now forms the eastern part of Abiko City along the south bank of the Tone River. There is also a Fusa Station on the Abiko branch of JR East Japan's Narita Line, located in the Fusa neighborhood of Abiko City.
