= Shimōsa Province =

7th century–1871 province of Japan

Shimōsa Province 下総国
- Province of Japan
- 7th century–1871
- Map of Japanese provinces (1868) with Shimōsa Province highlighted
- Capital: Kōnodai (Ichikawa City)
- History
  - Established: 7th century
  - Disestablished: 1871
Preceded by	Succeeded by
Fusa Province	Chiba Prefecture and Ibaraki Prefecture
- Today part of: Chiba Prefecture and Ibaraki Prefecture (as well as small parts of Saitama Prefecture and Tokyo)

Shimōsa Province (下総国, Shimōsa no Kuni; Japanese pronunciation: [ɕì.mó̞ò̞.sä̀ (nò̞ kɯ̈̀.ɲ̟ì), -mó̞ó̞.sä́ (nò̞ kɯ̈̀.ɲ̟ì), -mó̞ó̞.sä́ (nó̞ kɯ̈́.ɲ̟í)]) was a province of Japan in the area of modern Chiba Prefecture and Ibaraki Prefecture as well as the bordering parts of Saitama Prefecture and Tokyo (the parts that used to be located east of the lower reaches of the old Tone River prior to the river's eastward diversion, i.e. the parts of the former Katsushika District of Shimōsa that have been transferred to North Katsushika District of Saitama Prefecture and Sumida, Kōtō, Edogawa, and Katsushika wards of Tokyo). It lies to the north of the Bōsō Peninsula (房総半島), whose name takes its first kanji from the name of Awa Province and its second from Kazusa and Shimōsa Provinces. Its abbreviated form name was Sōshū (総州) or Hokusō (北総).

Shimōsa is classified as one of the provinces of the Tōkaidō. It was bordered by Kazusa Province to the south, Musashi and Kōzuke Provinces to the west, and Hitachi and Shimotsuke Provinces to the north. Under the Engishiki classification system, Shimōsa was ranked as a "great country" (大国) and a far country (遠国).

== History ==
Shimōsa was originally part of a larger territory known as Fusa Province (総国, occasionally 捄国, Fusa-no-kuni), which was divided into "upper" and "lower" portions (i.e. Kazusa and Shimōsa) during the reign of Emperor Kōtoku (645–654). It was well-known to the Imperial Court in Nara period Japan for its fertile lands, and is mentioned in Nara period records as having supplied hemp to the Court. Shimōsa was divided into 11 (later 12) counties. The exact location of the capital of Shimōsa is not precisely known, but is believed to have been somewhere within the borders of the modern city of Ichikawa, Chiba, near Kōnodai Station where the ruins of the Kokubun-ji have been located. However, the Ichinomiya of Shimōsa Province is the Katori Jingū in what is now the city of Katori, Chiba, on the opposite coast of the province.

During the Heian period, the province was divided into numerous shōen controlled by local samurai clans, primarily the Chiba clan, which sided with Minamoto no Yoritomo in the Genpei War. During the Kamakura period, much of the province was under the control of the Chiba clan. By the early Muromachi period, the area was a highly contested region highly fragmented by various samurai clans. By the Sengoku period, the Later Hōjō clan held sway following the Battle of Kōnodai (1538) against the Ashikaga clan and the Satomi clan.

Following the installation of Tokugawa Ieyasu in Edo, after the Battle of Odawara, he created eleven han within the borders of Shimōsa to reward his followers, with the remaining area retained as tenryō territory owned directly by the shōgun and administered by various hatamoto. The entire province had an assessed revenue of 681,062 koku. Following the Meiji Restoration, these various domains and tenryō territories were transformed into short-lived prefectures in July 1871 by the abolition of the han system. Most of Shimōsa Province became part of the new Chiba Prefecture on June 15, 1873, with four districts (Yūki, Toyoda, Sashima, Okada) going to the new Ibaraki Prefecture and the portion to the west of the Edogawa River going to the new Saitama Prefecture.

== Historical districts ==
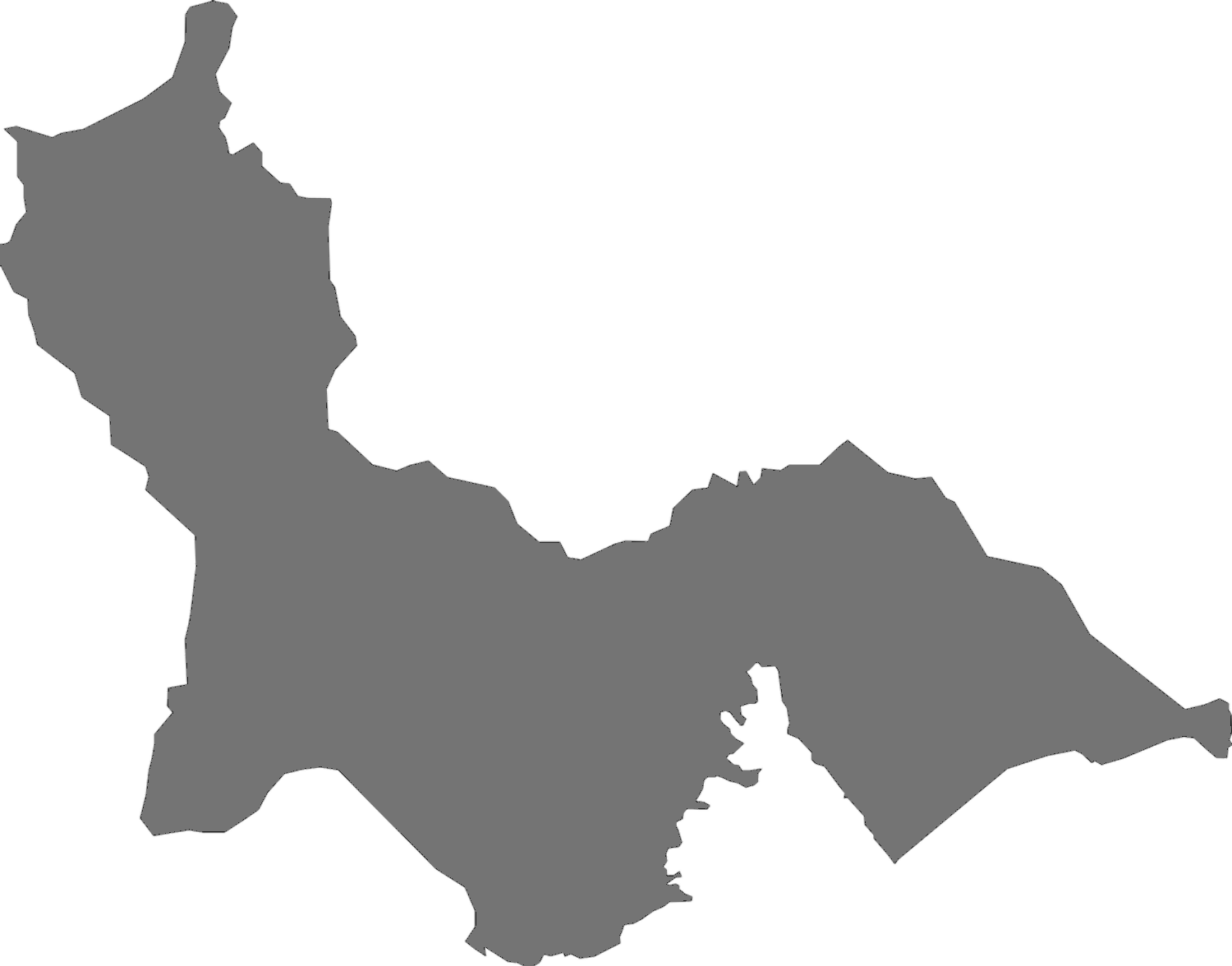

The area of former Shimōsa Province was organized into twelve districts by the Meiji cadastral reforms: Chiba, Inba, Katori, Kaijō, Shimohabu. Sōsa, Okada, Sashima, Toyoda, Yūki, Sōma and Katsushika.

- Chiba Prefecture
  - Chiba District (ja:千葉郡) – dissolved
  - Inba District (ja:印旛郡) – absorbed Shimohabu District on April 1, 1897
  - Katori District (ja:香取郡)
  - Kaijō District (ja:海上郡) – dissolved
  - Shimohabu District (ja:下埴生郡) – merged into Inba District on April 1, 1897
  - Sōsa District (ja:匝瑳郡) – dissolved
- Ibaraki Prefecture
  - Okada District (ja:岡田郡) – merged into Yūki District on March 29, 1896
  - Sashima District (ja:猿島郡) – absorbed Nishikatsushika District on March 29, 1896
  - Toyoda District (ja:豊田郡 (下総国)) – merged into Yūki District on March 29, 1896
  - Yūki District (ja:結城郡) – absorbed Okada and Toyoda Districts on March 29, 1896
- Mixed
  - Sōma District (ja:相馬郡 (下総国)) – dissolved
    - Kitasōma District (ja:北相馬郡) (Ibaraki)
    - Minamisōma District (ja:南相馬郡) (Chiba) – merged into Higashikatsushika District on April 1, 1897
  - Katsushika District (ja:葛飾郡) – dissolved
    - Higashikatsushika District (ja:東葛飾郡) (Chiba) – absorbed Minamisōma District on April 1, 1897; – now dissolved
    - Nakakatsushika District (ja:中葛飾郡) (Saitama) – merged into Kitakatsushika District (Musashi, Saitama) on March 29, 1896
    - Nishikatsushika District (ja:西葛飾郡) (Ibaraki) – merged into Sashima District on March 29, 1896
    - Minamikatsushika District (ja:南葛飾郡) (Tokyo)

== Edo-period domains in Shimōsa Province ==
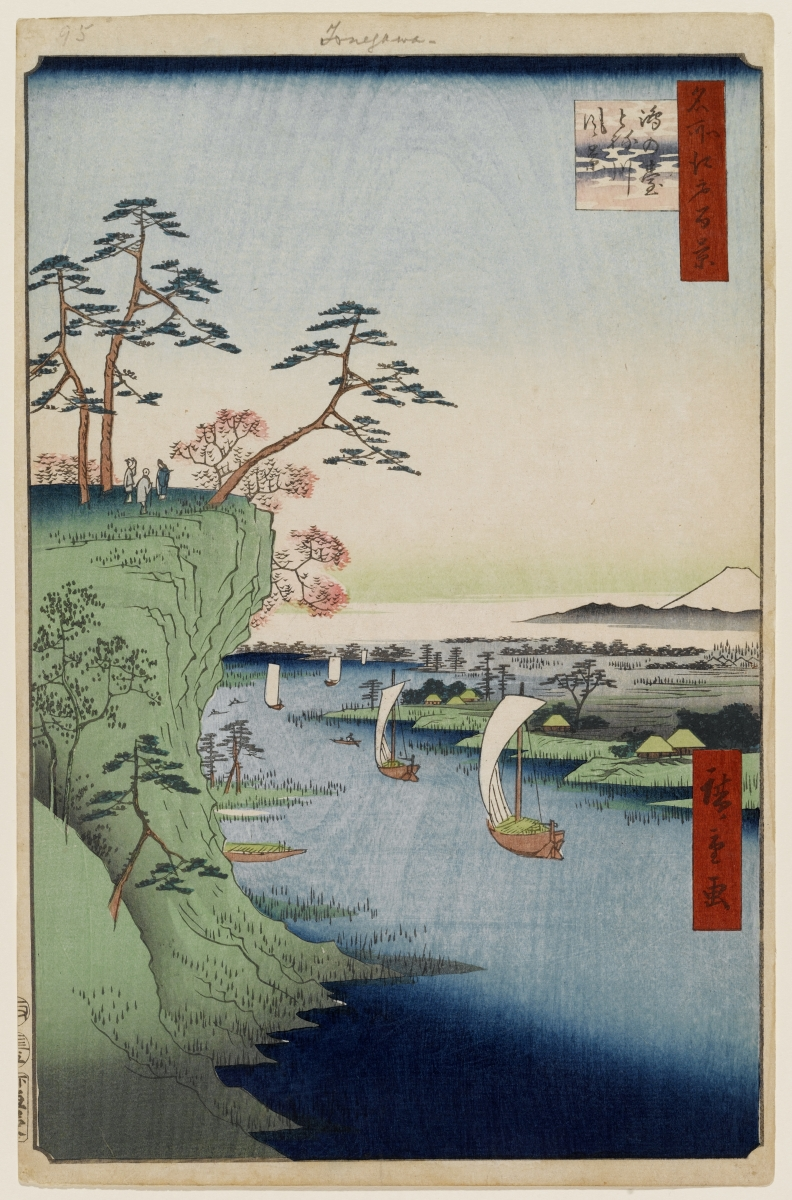
Hiroshige's View of Kōnodai in Shimōsa-specifically, the then-village of Ichikawa, Chiba

Domain	Daimyō	Dates	Revenue (koku)	Type
Koga Domain (古河藩)	Doi	1590–1871	80,000	fudai
Sakura Domain (佐倉藩)	Hotta	1590–1871	110,000	fudai
Yūki Domain (結城藩)	Mizuno	1590–1871	18,000	fudai
Sekiyado Domain (関宿藩)	Kuze	1590–1871	43,000	fudai
Oyumi Domain (生実藩)	Morikawa	1627–1871	10,000	fudai
Takaoka Domain (高岡藩)	Inoue	1640–1871	10,000	fudai
Tako Domain (多胡藩)	Matsudaira (Hisamatsu)	1713–1871	10,000	fudai
Omigawa Domain (小見川藩)	Uchida	1594–1871	10,000	fudai
Sogano Domain (曾我野藩)	Toda	1871–1871	12,000	fudai
Yahagi Domain (矢作藩)	Miura	1590–1639	10,000	fudai
Iwatomori Domain (岩富藩)	Hōjō	1590–1613	10,000	fudai
Moriya Domain (守谷藩)	Toki	1590–1617	10,000	fudai
Yamazaki Domain (下総山崎藩)	Okabe	1590–1609	12,000	fudai
Kurihara Domain (栗原藩)	Naruse	1600–1638	16,000	fudai
Usui Domain (臼井藩)	Sakai	1690–1604	30,000	fudai
Yamakawa Domain (山川藩)	Ōta	1635–1638	15,600	fudai
Ōwa Domain (大輪藩)	Doi	1658–1677	10,000	fudai
