= List of shell ring sites =

This List of shell ring sites includes archaeological sites with confirmed and possible shell rings. Shell rings have been reported from Colombia, Peru, Japan, and the southeastern United States. Some sites have two or more shell rings, including some with two more or less equal rings joined together, or a main ring with smaller rings attached to it. About half of the sites with shell rings in the United States are in the Sea Islands of South Carolina, Georgia, and northeastern Florida.

== Colombia ==
- Puerto Hormiga - Late Archaic shell ring.

== Japan ==
- Arayashiki Shell Mound - Jōmon period circular shell mound.
- Futatsumori Shell Mound - Late Early to Middle Jōmon period horseshoe-shaped shell mound.
- Horinouchi Shell Mound site - Late to Latest Jōmon period horseshoe-shaped shell mound.
- Kasori Shell Mound - Two Middle to Late Jōmon period circular shell mounds.
- Kidosaku shellmound site - Middle to Late Jōmon period circular shell mound.
- Kotehashi Shell Mound - Late to Latest Jōmon period horseshoe-shaped shell mound.
- Kowashimizu - Jōmon period circular shell mound.
- Nagane Shell Mound - horseshoe-shaped shell mound.
- Soya Shell Mound - Jōmon period horseshoe-shaped shell mound.
- Ubayama Shell Mound - Middle to Late Jōmon period horseshoe-shaped shell mound.

== United States ==
=== South Carolina Sea Islands ===
- Auld Mound, or Yough Hall Plantation Shell Ring (38CH41) - Late Archaic shell ring, listed in National Register of Historic Places (NRHP).
- Barrows (38BU300) - Late Archaic shell ring.
- Bull Island (38BU475) - Shell ring of undetermined date.
- Buzzard's Island Site (38CH23) - Late Archaic shell ring, listed in NRHP.
- Chester Field (38BU29) - Late Archaic shell ring, listed in NRHP.
- Coosaw Island (38BU1866) - Four shell rings, two conjoined, at least three are Late Archaic.
- Crow Island (38CH60) - C-shaped mound, possible shell ring.
- Fig Island Site (38CH42) - Three Late Archaic shell rings, one with several attached rings, listed in NRHP, National Historic Landmark (NHL).
- Green's Shell Enclosure - Late Archaic shell ring, listed in NRHP.
- Guerard Point (38BU21) Reported as a ring in 1897, now completely leveled.
- Hanckel Mound, or Leadenwah Creek Mount (38CH7) - Late Archaic shell ring, listed in NRHP.
- Horse Island (38CH14) - Late Archaic shell ring, listed in NRHP.
- Lighthouse Point Shell Ring, or Parrot's Point Shell Ring (38CH12) - Late Archaic shell ring, listed in NRHP.
- Patent (38BU301) - Late Archaic shell ring.
- Sea Pines (38BU7) - Late Archaic shell ring, listed in NRHP.
- Sewee Mound (38CH45) - Late Archaic shell ring, listed in NRHP.
- Skull Creek (38BU8) - Two conjoined Late Archaic shell rings, listed in NRHP.
- Stratton Place (38CH24) - Late Archaic shell ring.

=== Georgia Sea Islands ===
- Barbour Island (9MC320) - Late Archaic possible shell ring.
- Bony Hammock (9GN53) - Late Archaic possible shell ring.
- Busch Krick (9MC87)- Late Archaic shell ring, damaged.
- Cane Patch (9CH35) - Late Archaic possible shell ring, has been mined.
- Cannon's Point (9GN57) Late Archaic shell ring.
- Hokfv-Mocvse - Early Late Archaic (5090–4735 BP) shell ring. As of 2024, the oldest known shell ring in the Southeastern United States, aceramic.
- Long Field Crescent/St. Catherines Island Shell Ring (9LI231) - Late Archaic shell ring, listed in NRHP.
- McQueen Shell Ring - Late Archaic shell ring.
- Oemler (9CH14) - Late Archaic possible shell ring.
- Osabaw 77 (9CH203) - Late Archaic possible shell ring.
- Sapelo Island (9MC23) - Three Late Archaic shell rings, Sapelo 1 largely intact, Sapelo 2 heavily damaged, Sapelo 3 may represent either early stages in construction of a ring or a very heavily damaged ring.
- Skidaway Island
  - Odingsell (9CH111) - Late Archaic possible shell ring.
  - Large and Small Skidaway 9 (9CH63) Two shell rings, possibly pre-ceramic.
  - Skidaway 21 (9CH75) - Possible shell ring.
  - Skidaway (9CH77) - Late Archaic shell ring, highly modified.
- West (9GN76) - Late Archaic shell ring.

=== Florida ===
==== Sea Islands ====
- Grand Shell Ring (8DU1) - Early St. Johns II culture (900-1250) shell ring associated with a sand mound, listed in NRHP.
- Oxeye (8DU7478) - Late Archaic shell ring. One of the oldest shell rings in the Southeastern United States, aceramic.
- Rollins (8DU7510) - Late Archaic large shell ring with many smaller rings attached.

==== East Coast and St. Johns River valley ====
- Guana (8SJ2554) - Late Archaic shell ring.
- Joseph Reed (8MT13) - Late Archaic shell ring.
- Silver Glen Run (8LA1) - Archaic U-shaped shell ring.

==== Southwest ====
- Bonita Bay (8LL716, 8LL717) - Shell ring with associated mound of uncertain date.
- Chokoloskee - Possible shell ring with associated shell works, destroyed by development.
- Dismal Key - Two Glades culture shell rings with associated shell works.
- Dismal Key Southeast Ring - Shell ring.
- Everglades City No. 7 - Two late Archaic/Glades culture shell rings.
- Everglades City No. 9 - Two late Archaic shell rings.
- Everglades City No. 10 - Two late Archaic shell rings.
- Everglades City South Ring - Glades culture shell ring.
- Fakahatchee Key - Two Glades culture shell rings with associated shell works.
- Fakahatchee Key 3 - Shell ring.
- Hill Cottage (8SO2) - Late Archaic shell ring.
- Horr's Island archaeological site (8CR206, 8CR207, 8CR208, 8CR209, 8CR211) - Late Archaic shell ring with associated mounds.
- Key Marco - Possible Glades culture shell ring with associated shell works, destroyed by development.
- Russell Key - Glades culture shell ring with associated shell works.
- Sandfly Key - Two late Archaic/Glades culture shell rings with associated shell works.
- Santina Horseshoe - Possible shell ring.
- West Pass - Possible shell ring (crescent shaped midden) with associated shell works.

==== Big Bend Coast ====
- Deer Island (8LV75) - Deptford culture.
- Komar Island (8LV290) - U-shaped ring.
- Richards Island (8LV137) - U-shaped ring, possible Deptford, SwiftCreek or Weeden Island connections.
- Raleigh Island - Multiple small rings, dated 900–1200.

==== Panhandle ====
Primarily ring middens rather than shell rings.

- Bird Hammock - Swift Creek culture ring midden.
- Mound Field - Swift Creek culture ring midden.
- Snow Beach - Swift Creek culture ring midden.
- Harrison - Swift Creek culture ring midden.
- Hare Hammock - Swift Creek culture ring midden.
- Baker - Swift Creek culture ring midden.
- Strange's Ring Midden (8BY1355) - late Weeden Island culture period midden ring.
- Bayview - Swift Creek culture ring midden.
- Fox's Pond - Swift Creek culture ring midden.
- Bear Point - Santa Rosa-Swift Creek culture ring midden.
- Horseshoe Bayou - Santa Rosa-Swift Creek culture shell ring.
- Old Homestead - Santa Rosa-Swift Creek culture ring midden.
- Third Gulf Breeze - Santa Rosa-Swift Creek culture ring.
- Plantation Hill West - Santa Rosa-Swift Creek culture ring midden.
- Bernath - Santa Rosa-Swift Creek culture ring.
- Buck Bayou (8WL90) - Late Archaic, possible shell ring, possible connections to Poverty Point.
- Fourmile Point - Santa Rosa-Swift Creek culture ring.
- Gulf Breeze - Santa Rosa-Swift Creek culture ring.
- Hammock Point - Santa Rosa-Swift Creek culture ring.
- Meig's Pasture (8OK102) Late Archaic ring, but little shell.
- Strange Bayou - Santa Rosa-Swift Creek culture ring.

=== Alabama ===
- Indian Mound Park (Dauphin Island, Alabama) Mississippian period (1100 -1550) possible shell ring.

=== Mississippi ===
- Cedarland (22HC30) - Late Archaic shell ring with a number of differences compared to Atlantic coast rings.
- Claiborne (22HC35) - Late Archaic shell ring with a number of differences compared to Atlantic coast rings.
- Kinlock (22SU526) - Fresh water mussel shell C-shaped ring.
