= Municipal Museum of Archaeology in Ichikawa =

Archaeology museum in Ichikawa, Chiba, Japan

- 市立市川考古博物館
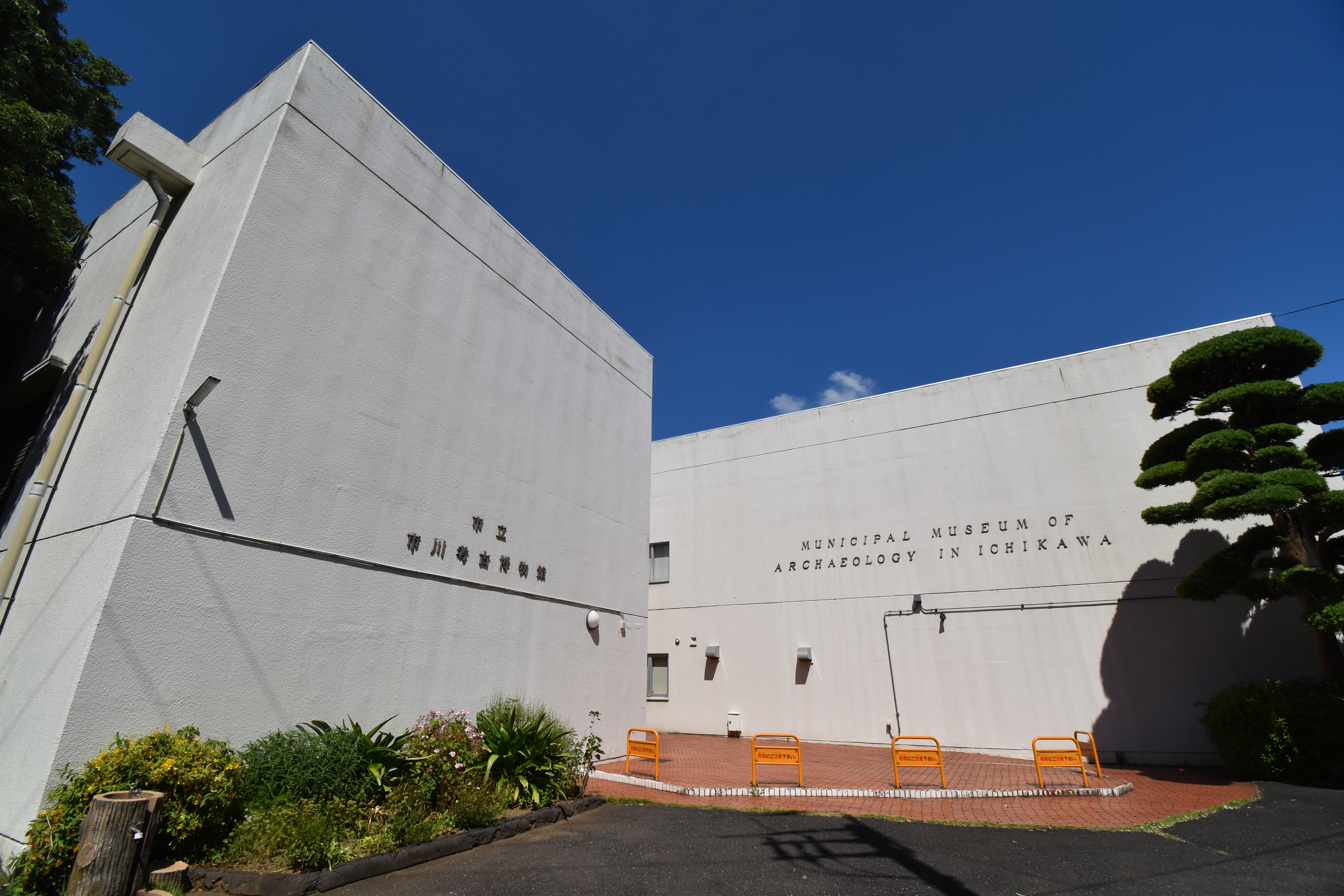
- Interactive map of the Municipal Museum of Archaeology in Ichikawa area

General information
- Location: 2-26-1 Horinouchi, Ichikawa, Chiba Prefecture, Japan
- Coordinates: 35°45′33″N 139°54′44″E
- Opened: November 1972

Website
- Official website (in Japanese)

The Municipal Museum of Archaeology in Ichikawa (市立市川考古博物館, Shiritsu Ichikawa Kōko Hakubutsukan) first opened in Ichikawa, Chiba Prefecture, Japan in 1972 as the Ichikawa City Museum. With the opening of the adjacent Municipal Museum of History in Ichikawa in 1982, the museum changed its name to that of today. The Museum of Archaeology is concerned with the archaeology and history of the area from prehistoric times through to the Heian period, the Museum of History with the Heian period onwards. The collection and displays include artefacts from Horinouchi Shell Mound, Soya Shell Mound, Ubayama Shell Mound, Shimōsa Kokubun-ji, and Shimōsa Kokubun-niji.

== Gallery ==
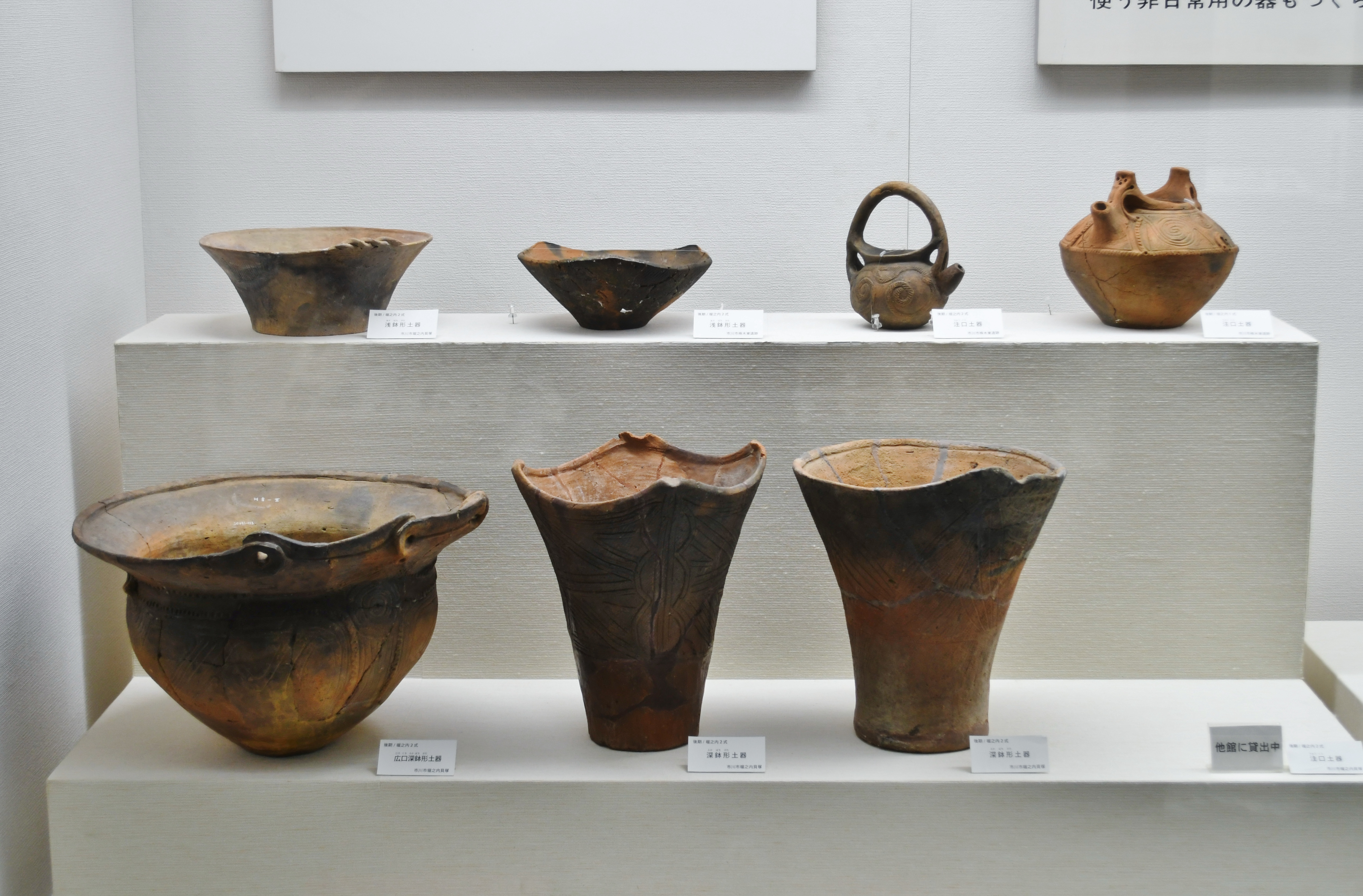
Jōmon pottery from Horinouchi Shell Mound

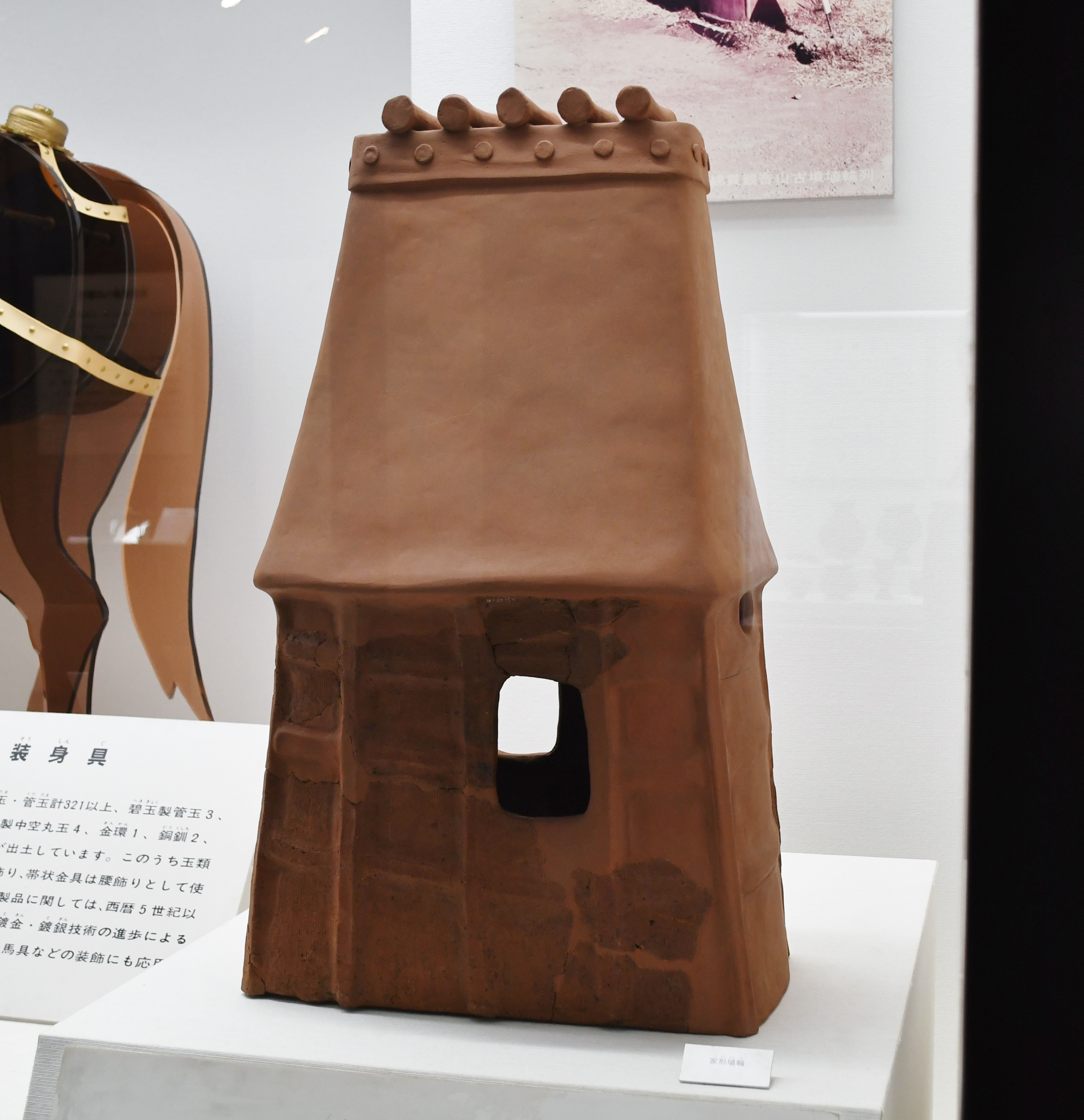
House-shaped haniwa from Hōōzuka Kofun

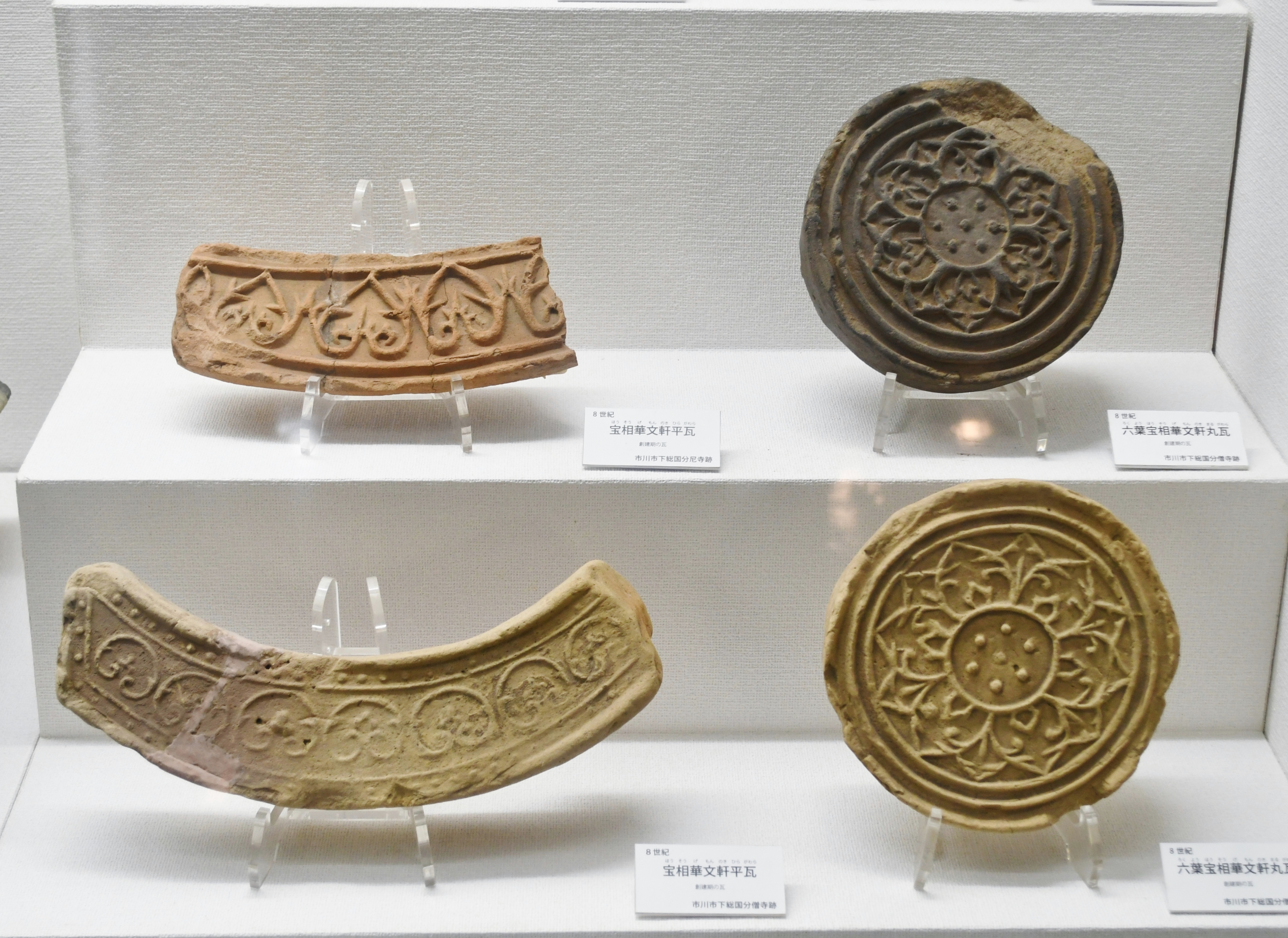
Roof tiles from Shimōsa Kokubun-ji

== See also ==
- Chiba Museum of Science and Industry
- National Museum of Japanese History
