= Kotehashi Shell Mound =

Archaeological site in Hanamigawa

Kotehashi Shell Midden
- 犢橋貝塚 (Japanese)
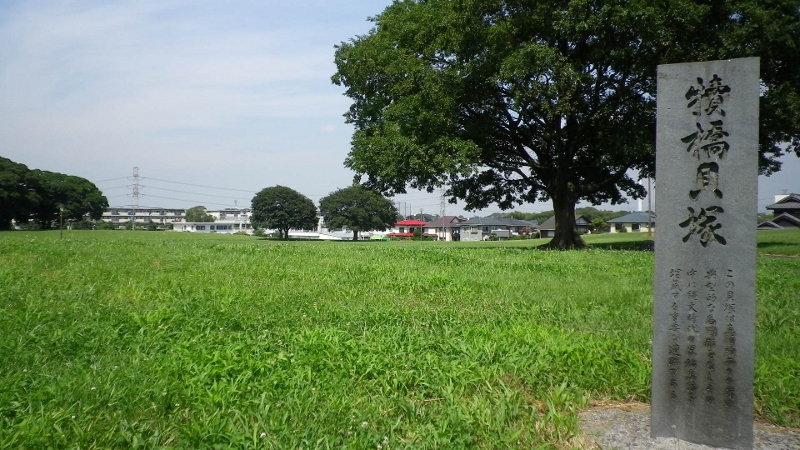
- Kotehashi Shell Midden

- Kotehashi Shell Midden Kotehashi Shell Mound (Japan)
- 35°39′50″N 140°05′47″E
- Type: shell midden
- Periods: Jōmon period
- Location: Hanamigawa-ku, Chiba, Japan
- Region: Kantō region

Site notes
- Public access: Yes (park)

The Kotehashi Shell Midden (犢橋貝塚, Kotehashi kaizuka) is an archaeological site in the Satsukigaoka neighborhood of Hanamigawa ward of the city of Chiba, Chiba Prefecture, in the Kantō region of Japan containing a Jōmon period shell midden. It was designated a National Historic Site of Japan in 1981.

== Overview ==
During the early to middle Jōmon period (approximately 4000 to 2500 BC), sea levels were five to six meters higher than at present, and the ambient temperature was also 2 deg C higher. During this period, the Kantō region was inhabited by the Jōmon people, many of whom lived in coastal settlements. The middens associated with such settlements contain bone, botanical material, mollusc shells, sherds, lithics, and other artifacts and ecofacts associated with the now-vanished inhabitants, and these features, provide a useful source into the diets and habits of Jōmon society. Most of these middens are found along the Pacific coast of Japan. Of the approximately 2400 shell middens throughout Japan, about 120 are concentrated in Chiba city.

The Kotehashi midden is located at the base of a plateau with an elevation of 26 meters above the present sea level, on the upper reaches of the Hanami River. It has a horseshoe shape opening to the northeast, forming a partial shell ring with dimensions of 200 meters from east-to-west by 150 meters from north-to-south, and was constructed during the transition from the late to the final Jōmon period. Full-scale archaeological excavations were conducted three times by Meiji University, Tokyo Gakugei University and Chiba University in 1951, 1956, and 1964. The shells that make up the shell mound are shellfish that live in the sand and mud in the inner bay, such as hamaguri, asari, kesago, and the midden also contained very large numbers of ibusago. Animal bones included those of deer, monkeys and tanuki. Although a number of stone tools, bone fish hooks, etc. have been found, no trace of a settlement has yet been found. The site is currently maintained and preserved as a historical park. It is located five minutes on foot from the "Satsukigaoka Daiichi" stop on the Keisei bus from Shin-Kemigawa Station on the JR East Sobu Main Line.

== See also ==
- List of Historic Sites of Japan (Chiba)
- List of shell ring sites
