= Arayashiki Shell Mound =

Archaeological site in Chiba, Japan

Arayashiki Shell Midden
- 荒屋敷貝塚 (Japanese)
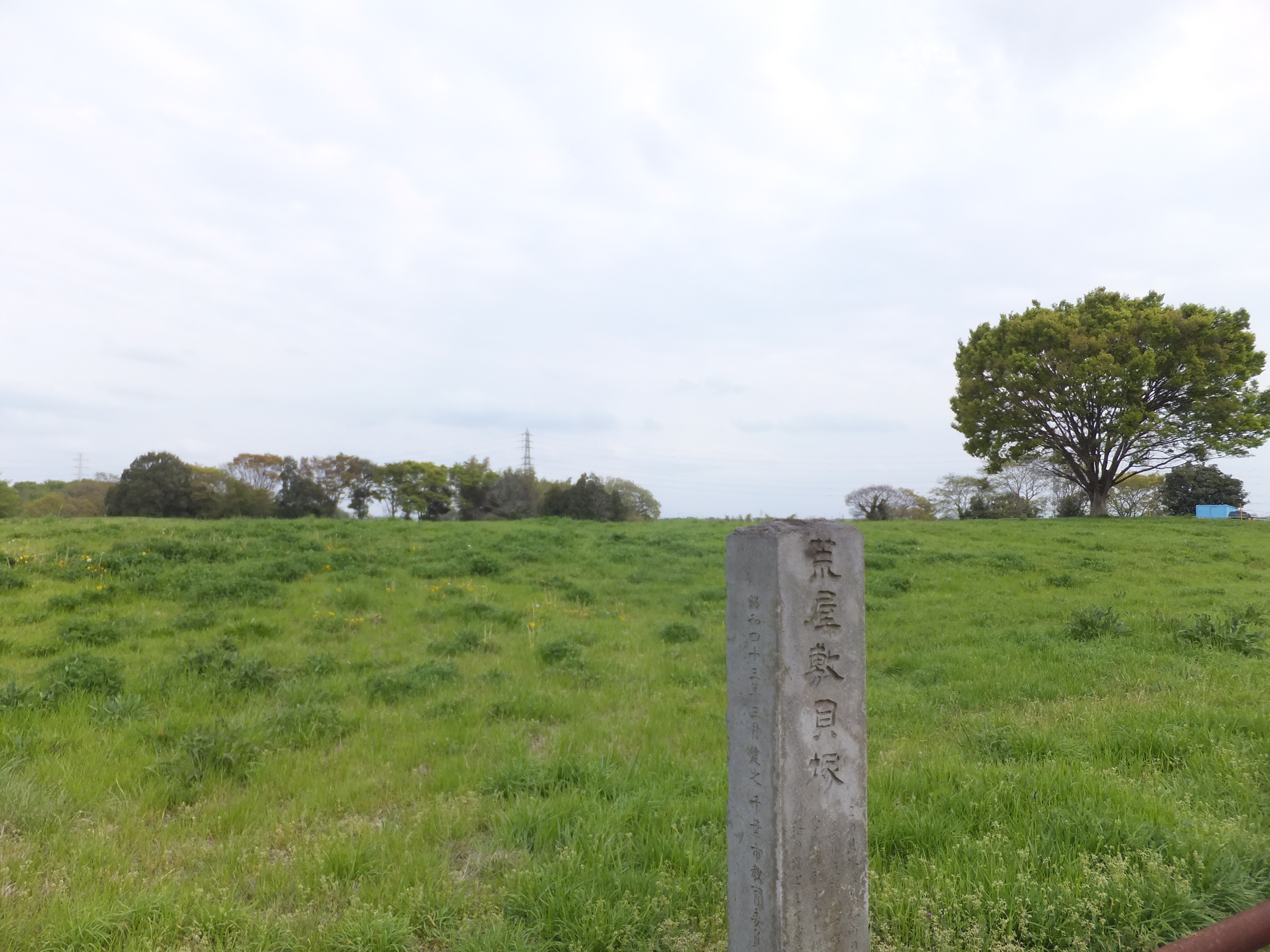
- Arayashiki Shell Midden

- Arayashiki Shell Midden Arayashiki Shell Mound (Japan)
- 35°37′18″N 140°08′44″E
- Type: shell midden, settlement
- Periods: Jōmon period
- Location: Wakaba-ku, Chiba, Japan
- Region: Kantō region

Site notes
- Public access: Yes (no public facilities)

The Arayashiki Shell Midden (荒屋敷貝塚, Arayashiki kaizuka) is an archaeological site in the Kaizuka neighborhood of Wakaba ward of the city of Chiba, Chiba Prefecture, in the Kantō region of Japan containing a Jōmon period shell midden and settlement ruin. The midden was designated a National Historic Site of Japan in 1979, with its boundaries extended in 1982.

== Overview ==
During the early to middle Jōmon period (approximately 4000 to 2500 BC), sea levels were five to six meters higher than at present, and the ambient temperature was also 2 deg C higher. During this period, the Kantō region was inhabited by the Jōmon people, many of whom lived in coastal settlements. The middens associated with such settlements contain bone, botanical material, mollusc shells, sherds, lithics, and other artifacts and ecofacts associated with the now-vanished inhabitants, and these features, provide a useful source into the diets and habits of Jōmon society. Most of these middens are found along the Pacific coast of Japan. Of the approximately 2400 shell middens throughout Japan, about 120 are concentrated in Chiba city.

The Arayashiki midden is located at an elevation of 31 meters, near the conjunction of the Yoshi River with the Miyakogawa River that flows through the center of Chiba City. It is one of a group of middens in the area and dates from the middle Jōmon period (approximately 5500 to 3500 years ago). The midden is horseshoe-shaped, coming close to forming a complete shell ring, with dimensions of 150 meters north-to-south by 160 meters east-to-west. The main species are shellfish are those found in the tidal flats of Tokyo Bay, such as hamaguri, asari, kesago, and very large numbers of ibusago. In addition, the bones of fish such as sardines were also found, indicating that active fishing was carried out. A number of pit dwellings sites and prehistoric storage pits have been found. The site was first discovered in 1872 when the area was mined for lime. A topographical survey was conducted by Tokyo Imperial University in 1942 and by the Kasori Kaizuka Museum in 1968. It has been excavated three times since 1973, but the major portion remains mostly intact. An extension of the Keiyō Road was initially planned to cross this site, but in 1964 the routing was changed to a tunnel in order to preserve the ruins.

Artifacts excavated are stored and displayed at the Chiba Prefectural Bōsōmura no Fudoki no Oka Museum (千葉県立房総のむらの風土記の丘資料館, Bōsōnomura no fudoki no oka shiryōkan). The site is about 10 minutes on foot from the "Totsubashi" bus stop on the Keisei bus from JR Chiba Station.

== See also ==
- List of Historic Sites of Japan (Chiba)
- List of shell ring sites
