= McQueen Shell Ring =

Archaeological site in Georgia, US

- Interactive map of McQueen Shell Ring
- Type: Shell ring
- Location: Saint Catherine's Island, Georgia
- Region: United States

The McQueen Shell Ring is a Late Archaic archaeological site on St. Catherines Island on the coast of Georgia, known for a quantity of copper artifacts recovered during excavations. This Late Archaic site was constructed between 2300 and 1800 (calendar) BC. Excavation findings include a conical pit, sheet copper, and calcined human and animal bones. The shell ring is one of a many structures found along the coast of the southeastern United States that were built primarily of oyster and clam shells. The copper artifacts have been analyzed at the Elemental Analysis Facility at the Chicago Field Museum of Natural History.

== Background ==
Excavation data from the shell rings, including those on St. Catherines Island, suggests a steady flow of individuals and materials in and out of these rings, indicating complex social dynamics.

A significant finding at the McQueen Shell Ring concerns the storage practices used by hunter-gatherers, which shed light on their collection, storage, processing, and consumption practices. Although there have been few excavations at McQueens Shell Ring, they have provided evidence about these cultures including bones, trash pits, and burials sites. Some artifacts are housed at the Fernbank Museum of Natural History in Atlanta, Georgia.

== Findings ==
The analysis and discussion regarding copper found in the McQueen Shell ring provides information about probable sources of the copper, including the Minong Mine site on Isle Royale, the most probable source for over twelve artifacts. Analysis shows that other fragments were sourced from as far away as the central Appalachians, and the Canadian Maritimes. The McQueen copper fragments are more similar to themselves than any other analyzed sources. Later mining activity and geological processes have impacted the ability to source and document copper studies.

In addition to copper, pits contained crushed shells, one piece of Late Archaic Pottery, and fragments of charcoal. Additional excavations showed multiple shells such as clams, mussels, whelks, and periwinkles. Most notably, there were whole clam shells and substantial bone fragments.

These shell rings also showed evidence of ceremonial villages where the residents held intermittent gatherings and ceremonies, explaining why living structures were not found. Theories include people from nearby villages traveling here for ceremonial visits for special events and not habitation. Native American and Indigenous communities used shell rings for a variety of reasons, including residential villages, gathering points, and ceremonies.
