= Ubayama Shell Mound =

Archaeological site in Japan

- 姥山貝塚 (Japanese)
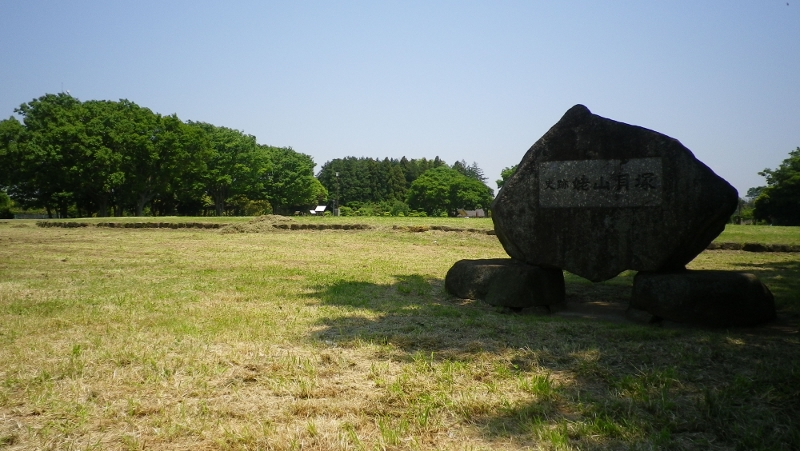
- Ubayama Shell Mound

- Ubayama Shell Mound Ubayama Shell Mound (Japan)
- 35°44′15″N 139°57′55″E
- Type: shell midden
- Periods: Jōmon period
- Location: Ichikawa, Chiba, Japan
- Region: Kantō region

Site notes
- Public access: Yes (park)

The Ubayama Shell Mound (姥山貝塚, Ubayama kaizuka) is an archaeological site in the Kashiwai neighborhood of the city of Ichikawa, Chiba Prefecture, in the Kantō region of Japan, containing a mid-to-late Jōmon period shell midden, designated a National Historic Site of Japan in 1967.

During the early to middle Jōmon period (approximately 4000 to 2500 BC), sea levels were five to six meters higher than at present, and the ambient temperature was two degrees Celsius higher. During this period, the Kantō region was inhabited by the Jōmon people, many of whom lived in coastal settlements. The middens associated with such settlements contain bone, botanical material, mollusc shells, sherds, lithics, and other artifacts and ecofacts associated with the now-vanished inhabitants, and these features, provide a useful source into the diets and habits of Jōmon society. Most of these middens are found along the Pacific coast of Japan.

The Ubayama site is located on the left bank of the Ohashiwa River, which flows into Tokyo Bay, on a plateau with an elevation of about 24 meters above the present sea level. The midden is horseshoe-shaped, measuring approximately 130 meters from east to west and 120 meters from north to south, forming an incomplete shell ring. The presence of a shell mound in this location was known at a relatively early time, and a preliminary survey was first made in 1893.

It was first excavated in 1926 by Tokyo Imperial University, at which time a group of 20 pit dwellings indicating the existence of a settlement were discovered. Five sets of human bones (two adult males, two adult females, and one child) were excavated from one of the pit dwelling sites, believed to be members of the same family group. This was the first excavation of a Jōmon period settlement associated with a shell midden. Further excavations found a total of 39 pit dwellings and 143 sets of human remains, along with large quantities of Jōmon pottery.

The midden contained shells from more than 30 species of clams and was used from about 5000 years to 3000 years ago. The bones of fugu puffer fish have also been found in the midden, indicating that this fish was part of the Japanese diet since the Jōmon period, although there is no evidence that the family group found in the 1926 excavation died of tetrodotoxin poisoning. The excavated items from this site are stored at the University of Tokyo, Nanzan University, Meiji University, and other locations, and are also exhibited at the Ichikawa Archeology Museum, which was built adjacent to the Horinouchi Shell Mound, also in the city of Ichikawa.

The site is maintained as the Ubayama Kaizuka Park (姥山貝塚公園Ubayama kaizuka kōen), and it is located about ten minutes on foot from Funabashihōten Station on the JR East Musashino Line.

== See also ==
- List of Historic Sites of Japan (Chiba)
- List of shell ring sites
