= Kasori Shell Mound =

Ancient shell midden in Chiba, Kantō, Japan

Kasori Shell Mounds
- 加曽利貝塚 (Japanese)
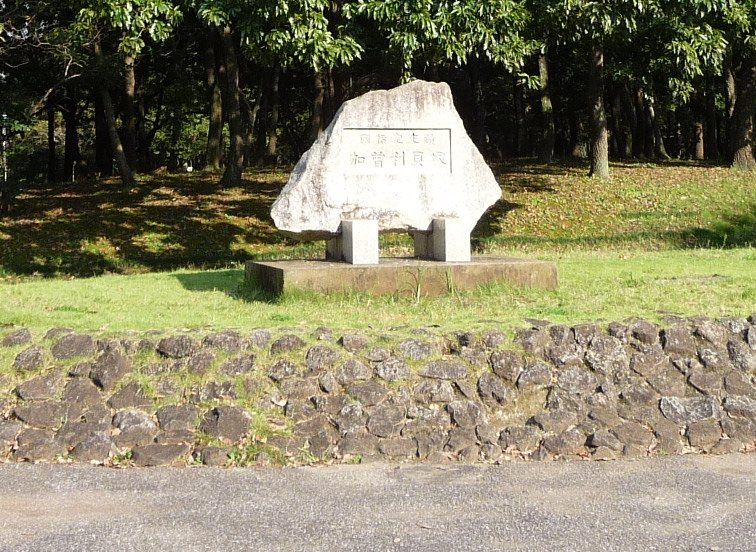
- Kasori Shell Mounds

- Kasori Shell Mounds Kasori Shell Mound (Japan)
- 35°37′24″N 140°09′53″E
- Type: shell midden, settlement
- Periods: Jōmon period
- Location: Wakaba-ku, Chiba, Japan
- Region: Kantō region

Site notes
- Public access: Yes (park)

The Kasori Shell Mounds (加曽利貝塚, Kasori kaizuka) is an archaeological site in the Sakuragi neighborhood of Wakaba ward of the city of Chiba, Chiba Prefecture, in the Kantō region of Japan. It contains the largest known shell midden found in Japan, and was designated a National Historic Site of Japan in 1971. Its status was raised to that of a special National Historic Site in 2017.

== Overview ==
During the early to middle Jōmon period (approximately 4000 to 2500 BC), sea levels were five to six meters higher than at present, and the ambient temperature was also 2 deg C higher. During this period, the Kantō region was inhabited by the Jōmon people, many of whom lived in coastal settlements. The middens associated with such settlements contain bone, botanical material, mollusc shells, sherds, lithics, and other artifacts and ecofacts associated with the now-vanished inhabitants, and these features, provide a useful source into the diets and habits of Jōmon society. Most of these middens are found along the Pacific coast of Japan. Of the approximately 2400 shell middens in the throughout Japan, about 120 are concentrated in Chiba city.

The Kasori Shell Mounds is located on a tongue-shaped plateau about 500 meters east-to-west by 800 meters north-to-south on the west bank of the Sakatsuki River, which is a tributary of the Miyakogawa River that flows east-west through the city of Chiba. The plateau is flat on the west side and slopes gently toward the east side. The soil layer including the shell mound is distributed over the eastern edge of the plateau over 300 meters east-to-west and 400 meters north-to-south.

The Kasori site has been inhabited since around 7000 years ago; however, the formation of the huge middens began in the middle Jōmon period, or around 5000 years ago, reaching a peak around 2500 years ago. The Kasori site was discovered in 1887 and was first excavated in 1924 by Tokyo Imperial University, and became a type site for "Kasori type earthenware", a unique type of Jōmon pottery. It is the largest shell midden of over 2,000 distributed throughout Japan and is one of the largest in the world. It consists of two shell mounds. The northern Kasori Kita Shell Midden dates from the middle Jōmon period (about 5000 to 4000 years ago), and has a diameter of 130 meters. It was built over a period of over 1000 years. The southern Kasori Minami Shell Midden is from the latter half of the Jōmon period (about 4000 to 3000 years ago) and also took about 1000 years to build. The southern midden has a horseshoe-shape with a long diameter of about 170 meters, and two shell mounds were connected in a figure eight forming a double shell ring. The middens contained shells from clams and oysters, fish bones including bones from black seabream and sea bass, tree nuts such as Japanese chestnuts, walnuts, and acorns, and fish hooks made of boar and deer bones and horns. The site also contains the ruins of a settlement with 110 pit dwellings, the largest of which had a diameter of over 19 meters. Two of these pit dwellings were from the early, 73 from the middle, 34 from the late and one from the final Jōmon period. A total of 53 human remains were also found (14 middle, 35 late, four final Jōmon period), and the bones of six dogs. It is the largest known Jōmon settlement in the Tokyo Bay area.

Only about 8% of the site has been excavated over then course of 37 excavations at 14 locations, and the remaining 92% is almost untouched. In 1971, Kasori Kita Shell Midden was designated as a National Historic Site; the Kasori Minami Shell Mound was added in 1978, and from 1986 the area was maintained as Kasori Kaizuka Park, with the Kasori Shell Mounds Museum (千葉市立加曽利貝塚博物館, Chiba Shiritsu Kasori Kaizuka Hakubutsukan). displaying excavated Jōmon pottery, stone tools, and other artifacts, and explaining in an easy-to-understand manner the daily life in the Jōmon period. The site is located about a 15 minutes walk from Sakuragi Station on the Chiba Urban Monorail.

== Gallery ==
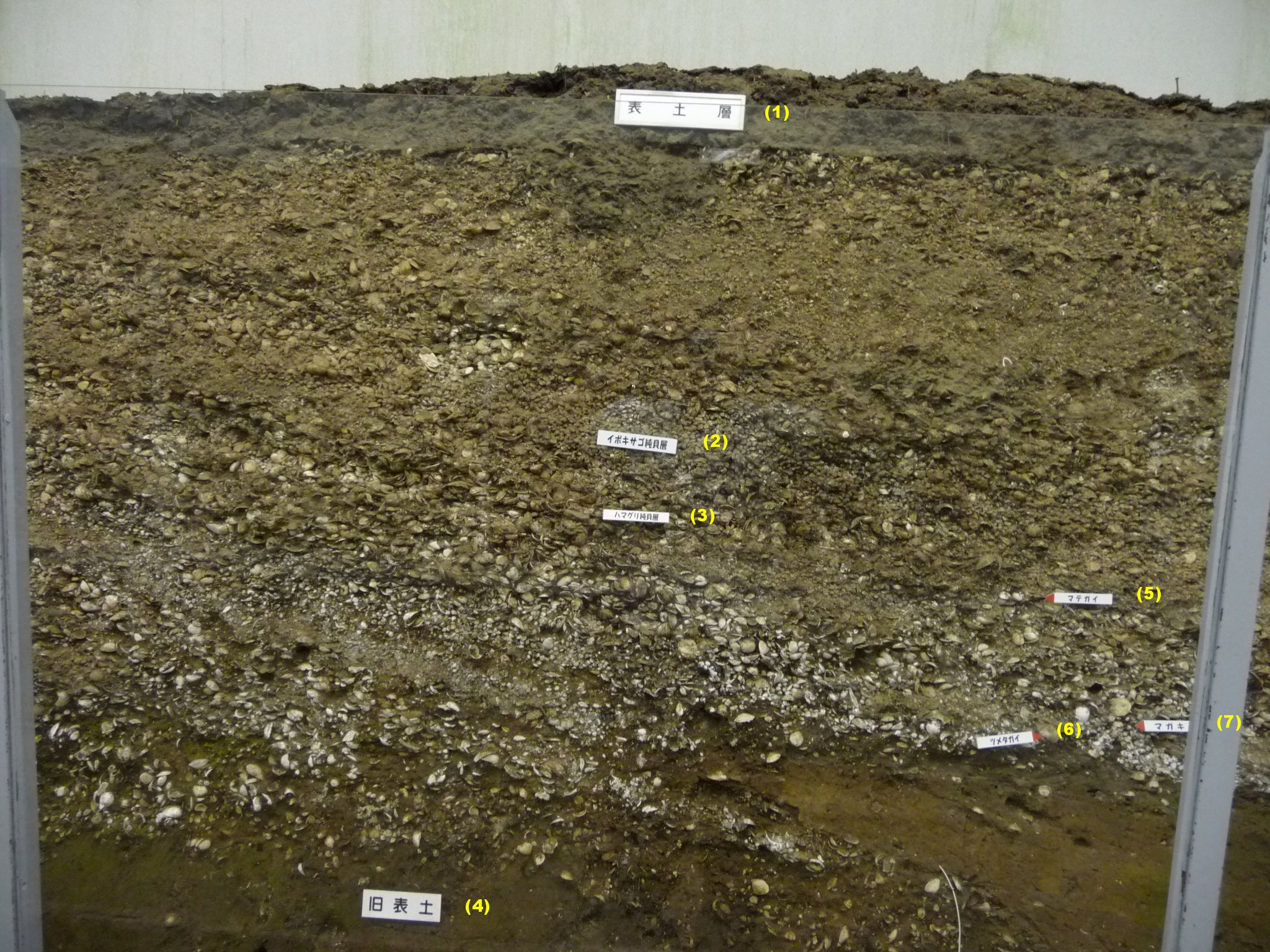
Cross-section of north midden

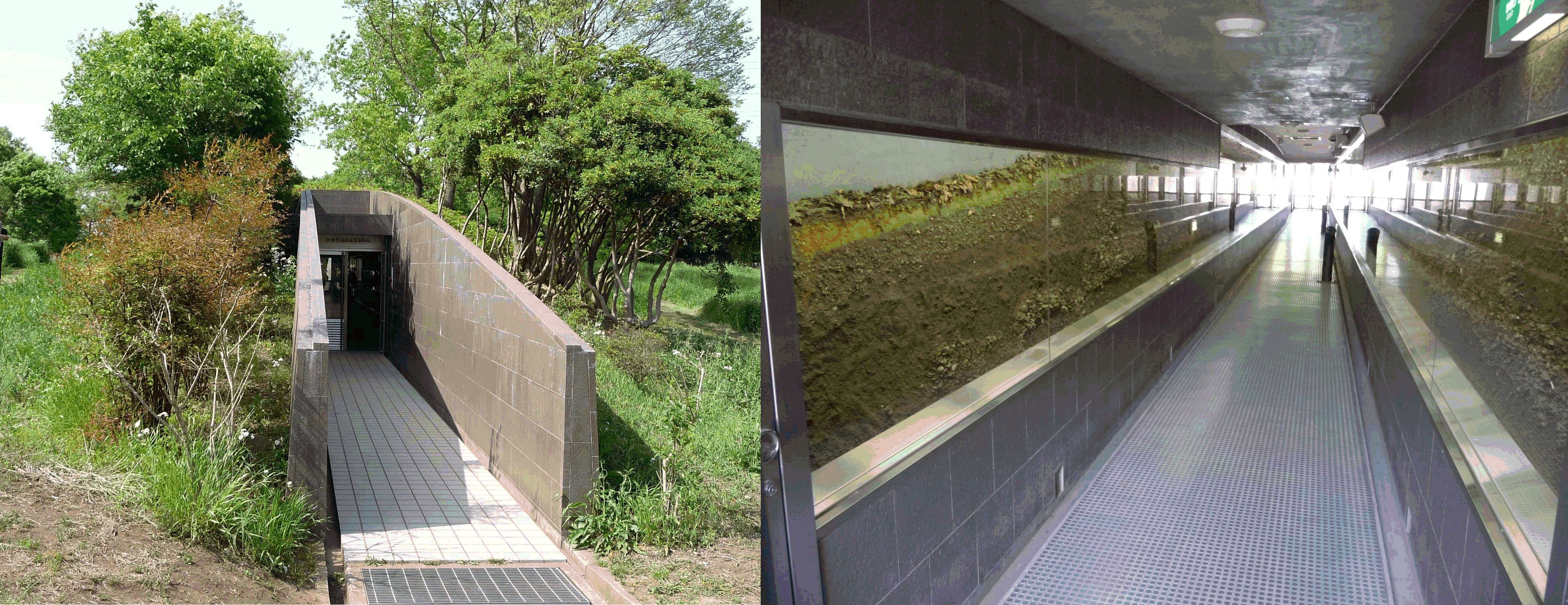
Viewing tunnel for south midden

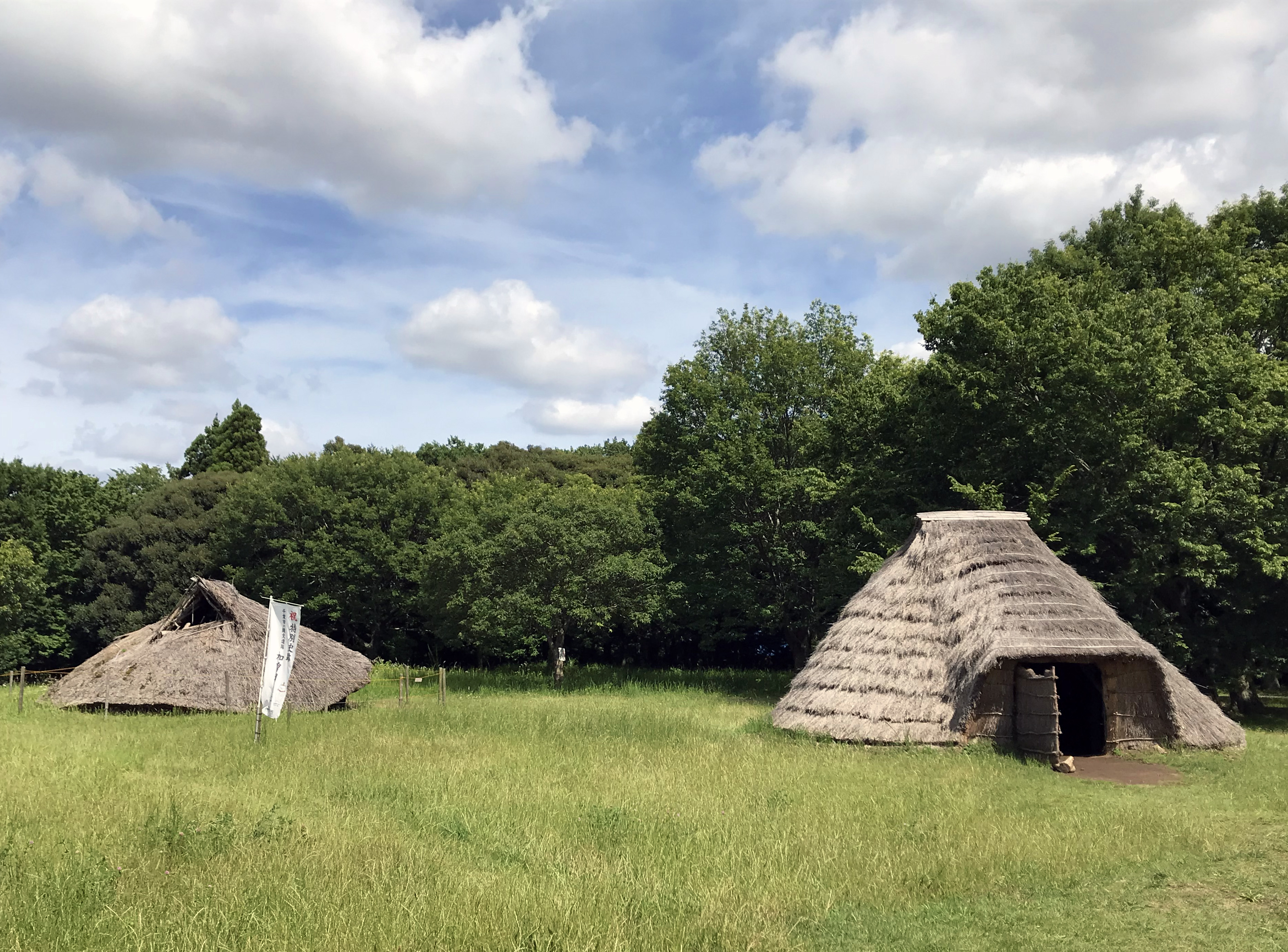
Reconstructed pit houses

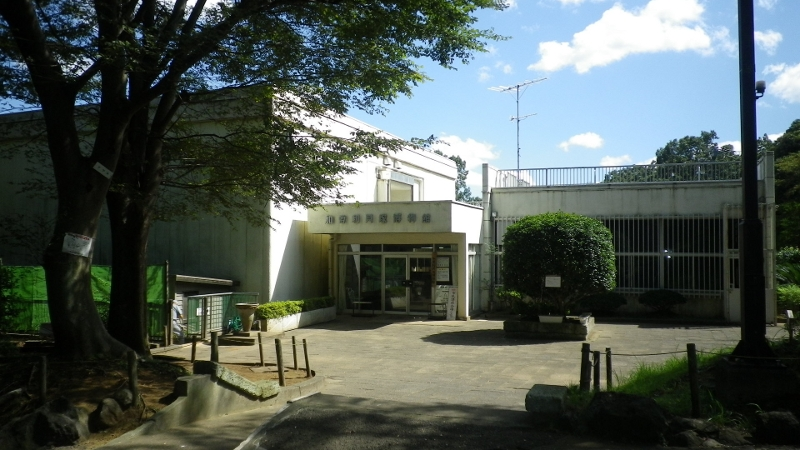
Kasori Shell Mounds Museum

== See also ==
- List of Historic Sites of Japan (Chiba)
- List of shell ring sites
