= Black clam =

Black clam may refer to:

- Cyclina sinensis
- Arctica islandica
