= Futatsumori Site =

- 二ツ森貝塚 (Japanese)
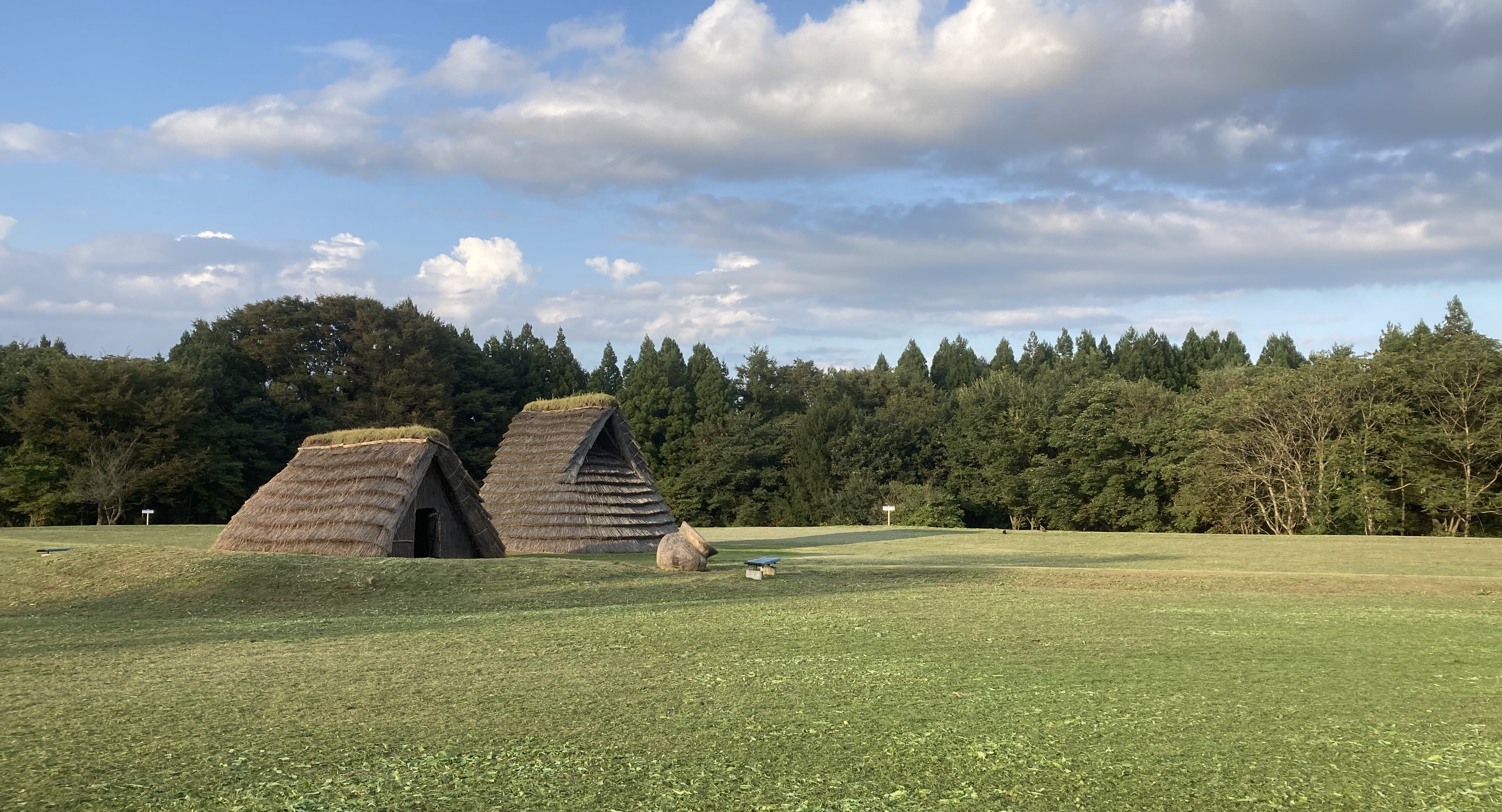
- The Futatsumori Site and restored pit dwellings

- Location within Aomori Prefecture Location within Japan
- 40°44′53″N 141°13′48″E
- Type: shell midden, settlement
- Periods: Jōmon period
- Location: Shichinohe, Aomori, Japan
- Region: Tōhoku region

History
- Built: 3500 to 2000 BC

Site notes
- Elevation: 30 m (98 ft)
- Area: 30 hectares (74 acres)
- Public access: Yes
- National Historic Site of Japan

The Futatsumori Site, known primarily in Japanese as the Futatsumori Shell Mound (二ツ森貝塚, Futatsumori Kaizuka), is an archaeological site consisting of a series of large shell middens and the remains of an adjacent settlement from the Jōmon period, located in what is now part of the town of Shichinohe in Aomori Prefecture in the Tōhoku region of northern Japan. It has been protected by the central government as a National Historic Site since 1998. The site covers an area of about 30 hectares.

== Overview ==
During the early to middle Jōmon period (approximately 3500 to 2000 BC), sea levels were five to six meters higher than at present, and the ambient temperature was also 2 °C higher. During this period, the Tōhoku region was inhabited by the Jōmon people, many of whom lived in coastal settlements. The middens associated with such settlements contain bone, botanical material, mollusc shells, sherds, lithics, and other artifacts and ecofacts associated with the now-vanished inhabitants, and these features, provide a useful source into the diets and habits of Jōmon society.

The Futatsumori Site is one of the largest found in the Tōhoku region, and is located on a 30 meter high plateau on the west bank of Lake Ogawara, which was a salt-water inlet of the Pacific Ocean at that time. It consists of several shell middens divided into two areas on the northern and southern slopes of the plateau.

The western section consists of seven smaller shell middens forming a rough shell ring. The eastern area consists of five much larger shell middens, also forming a rough shell ring, and enclosing the remains of the settlement. The 27 varieties of shells excavated indicate that the nearby Ogasawa inlet was salt water in the early Jōmon period, but had become brackish by the middle Jōmon period.

In addition to shells (with a high percentage of Yamato shijimi and hamaguri, the middens also contained many fish bones, bones from swans, ducks, deer, boars and other animals, indicating the varied diet of the local inhabitants. Shards of various types of Jōmon pottery were also discovered, as were artifacts made of jade and obsidian, which were not produced in the area, and which thus indicates trade with other areas. Canine remains were also discovered, indicating that the Jōmon period inhabitants kept dogs. The numerous foundations of pit dwellings and storage pits indicates that this was a large settlement. Four of the artifacts discovered at the site (intricately carved ornaments from bone) have been designated as Aomori Prefectural Important Cultural Properties.

The site has been submitted for inscription on the UNESCO World Heritage List as one of the Jōmon Archaeological Sites in Hokkaidō, Northern Tōhoku, and other regions

The site has two restored pit dwellings and an explanatory plaque. Some of the recovered artifacts are on display at the Shichinohe Town Cultural Center. The site is approximately 20 minutes by car from Kamikitachō Station on the Aoimori Railway.

== See also ==
- List of Historic Sites of Japan (Aomori)
- Jōmon Archaeological Sites in Hokkaidō, Northern Tōhoku, and other regions
- List of shell ring sites
