= Horinouchi Shell Mound =

Archaeological site in Ichikawa, Japan

Horinouchi Shell Midden
- 堀之内貝塚 (Japanese)
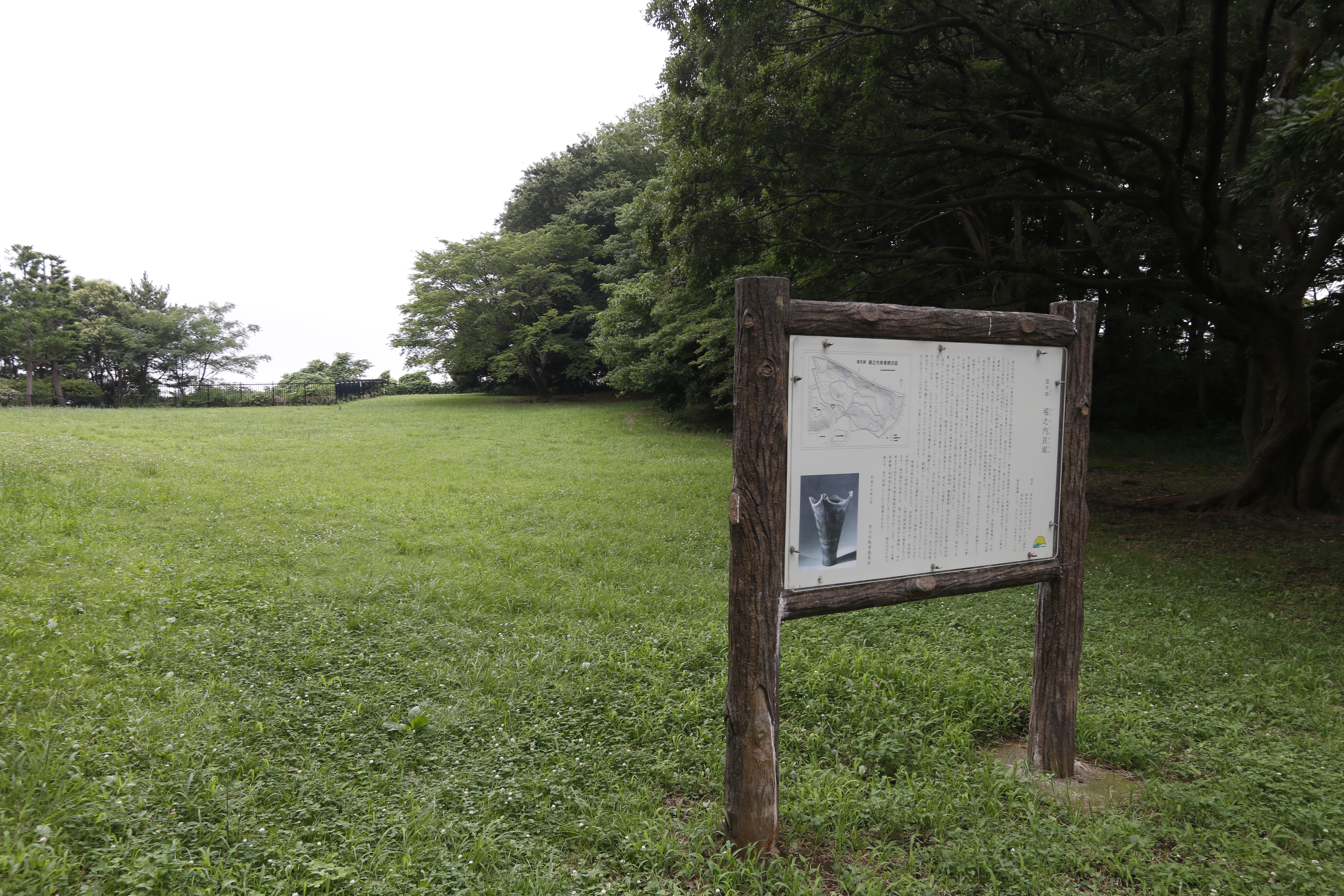

- Horinouchi Shell Midden Horinouchi Shell Mound (Japan)
- 35°45′33.6″N 139°54′37.9″E
- Type: shell midden
- Periods: Jōmon period
- Location: Ichikawa, Chiba, Japan
- Region: Kantō region

Site notes
- Public access: Yes (No facilities)

The Horinouchi Shell Midden (堀之内貝塚, Horinouchi kaizuka) is an archaeological site in the Horinouchi neighborhood of the city of Ichikawa, Chiba Prefecture, in the Kantō region of Japan containing a Jōmon period shell midden and settlement ruin. The site was designated a National Historic Site of Japan in 1964, with the area under designation expanded in 1967 and again in 1972.

== Overview ==
During the early to middle Jōmon period (approximately 4000 to 2500 BC), sea levels were five to six meters higher than at present, and the ambient temperature was also 2 deg C higher. During this period, the Kantō region was inhabited by the Jōmon people, many of whom lived in coastal settlements. The middens associated with such settlements contain bone, botanical material, mollusc shells, sherds, lithics, and other artifacts and ecofacts associated with the now-vanished inhabitants, and these features, provide a useful source into the diets and habits of Jōmon society. Most of these middens are found along the Pacific coast of Japan. Of the approximately 2400 shell middens throughout Japan, about 120 are concentrated in Chiba city.

The Horinouchi Shell Mound is located on a ridge-shaped plateau on the right bank of the Kokubun River near the western end of the Shimosa Plateau, with an elevation of about 22 meters. This was a peninsula jutting into Tokyo Bay during the Holocene glacial retreat, contemporary with the Jōmon period, when sea levels were higher than today. The midden has a horseshoe shape, measuring 120 meters from north-to-south by 225 meters from east-to-west, forming a partial shell ring. The shells are mainly from brackish water species, especially hamaguri, cockles, whelks, ibo-kesago and black clams. The foundations of a pit dwelling from the early Jōmon period has been found underneath the shell mound layer, and a number of human remains have been found in addition to Jōmon pottery, clay figurines, stone tools, shell bracelets and animal bones from within the midden itself.

The midden has been known since the early Meiji period and has been subject to numerous archaeological excavations due to its proximity to Tokyo, the first of which was carried out in 1901. Subsequent excavations have been conducted by Tokyo Imperial University, Rikkyo University, Waseda University. Keio University Meiji University and others. The site is a type site for a type of a type Jōmon pottery from the early to middle Jōmon period (about 3,800 years ago), which has been named "Horinouchi-style pottery", and which has been found widely distributed throughout the Kantō region.

Many of the artifacts recovered from the site are stored and displayed at the Ichikawa Archeological Museum (市川考古博物館, Ichikawa kōko hakubutsukan), which is located adjacent to the midden. The site is about eight minutes on foot from Kita-Kokubun Station on the Hokusō Railway Hokusō Line. The site of the Shimōsa Kokufu, and its adjacent Ichikawa History Museum are located about two kilometers south of the Horinouchi Shell Midden.

== See also ==
- List of Historic Sites of Japan (Chiba)
- List of shell ring sites
