= Soya Shell Mound =

Soya Shell Midden
- 曽谷貝塚 (Japanese)
- Soya Shell Midden Soya Shell Mound (Japan)
- 35°44′49.45″N 139°56′6.91″E
- Type: shell midden
- Periods: Jōmon period
- Location: Ichikawa, Chiba, Japan
- Region: Kantō region

Site notes
- Area: 50,216.87 m^{2} (540,529.9 sq ft)
- Public access: Yes (No facilities)

The Soya Shell Midden (曽谷貝塚, Soya kaizuka) is an archaeological site in the Soya neighborhood of the city of Ichikawa, Chiba Prefecture, in the Kantō region of Japan containing a Jōmon period shell midden and settlement ruin. It was designated a National Historic Site of Japan in 1979. The shell mound was formed in the latter half of the Jōmon period, about 4000 to 3000 years ago.

== Overview ==
During the early to middle Jōmon period (approximately 4000 to 2500 BC), sea levels were five to six meters higher than at present, and the ambient temperature was also 2 deg C higher. During this period, the Kantō region was inhabited by the Jōmon people, many of whom lived in coastal settlements. The middens associated with such settlements contain bone, botanical material, mollusc shells, sherds, lithics, and other artifacts and ecofacts associated with the now-vanished inhabitants, and these features, provide a useful source into the diets and habits of Jōmon society. Most of these middens are found along the Pacific coast of Japan. Of the approximately 2400 shell middens throughout Japan, about 120 are concentrated in Chiba city.

The Soya shell midden is located on the southwestern edge of the Shimosa Plateau in the northern part of the prefecture, on the left bank of the Kokubun River at an elevation of 22 to 25 meters above the present sea level. It has a horseshoe shape, measuring 240 meters from north-to-south by 210 meters from east-to-west, and is thus the largest shell midden on coast of Tokyo Bay. The midden was discovered in the late Meiji period, and was first excavated in 1893. It has been excavated numerous times subsequently including a topographical survey by Meiji University in 1959, Waseda University in 1960, and extensive excavation by the Ichikawa City Board of Education from 1974 to 1977.

The east side of the midden has two shell layers, and the west side has a single layer, and there are smaller shell middens scattered around the foot of the larger middens. The site was also found to contain the foundations of 38 pit dwellings, 21 prehistoric storage pits, and 20 sets of human remains. Of the pit dwellings, four were from the early Jōmon, one was from the middle Jōmon and 38 were from the later Jōmon periods. Most of the excavated Jōmon pottery is early Jōmon period Kurohama-type earthenware, Horinouchi-type earthenware, and Kasori B-type earthenware. It addition, stone tools, polished stone axes, stone jewelry, and bone needles were also excavated. Some of the Horinouchi I-type large jar-shaped pottery is thought to be used for burial. The shellfish forming the midden included hamaguri, cockles, whelks, ibo-kesago and Black clams. A large number of Ostrea denselamellosa shells were also found in one storage hole. These shells were used as the raw material for shell brackets, which are often found at Jōmon sites, and the presence of so many in one storage hole indicates that this was either a production facility, or that the shells were used as goods for external trading outside the settlement.

The site was backfilled after excavation, and is largely surrounded by a residential neighborhood. It is a five-minute walk from the Soya bus stop on the Keisei bus from Ichikawa Station on the JR East Sobu Line.

== See also ==
- List of Historic Sites of Japan (Chiba)
- List of shell ring sites
