= Ohajiki =

Traditional Japanese children's game

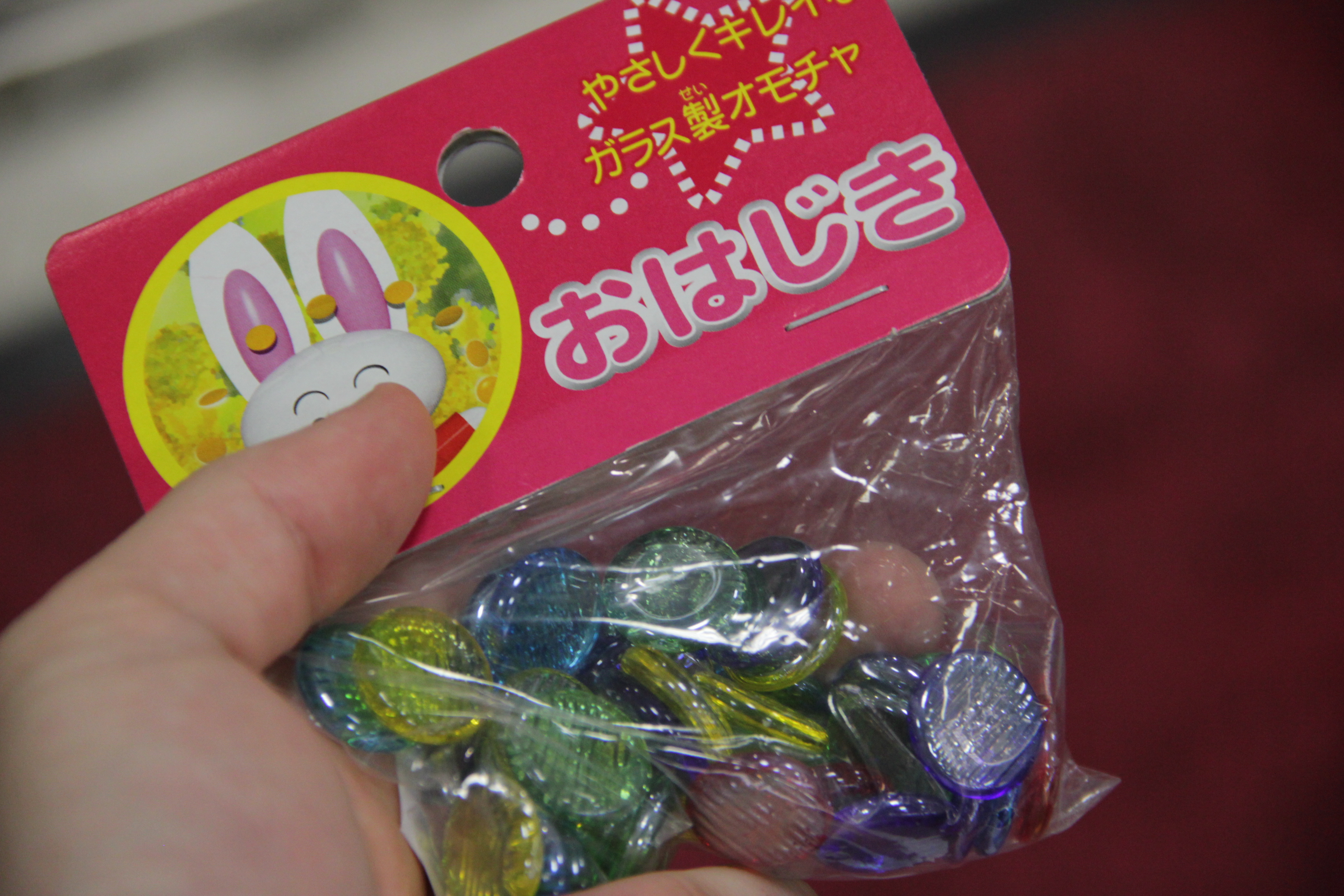
Bag of ohajiki

Ohajiki (おはじき) is a traditional Japanese children's game similar to marbles. It is played with small coin-shaped pieces also called ohajiki. Modern pieces are typically made of glass or plastic, but in the past seashells, pebbles, and Go stones were used. It is traditionally considered a game for girls.

== Etymology ==
The word ohajiki is the noun form of the verb hajiku, which means "to flick".

== Gameplay ==
The game's objective is to flick one's own pieces into the other player's pieces. Each player gets one flick per turn. Hitting a piece means the flicker now "owns" that piece. The player who owns the most pieces at the end wins.

Other variations include flicking the pieces into designated spots, pushing other players' pieces out of bounds, dropping pieces on top of another piece, and so forth.

== History ==
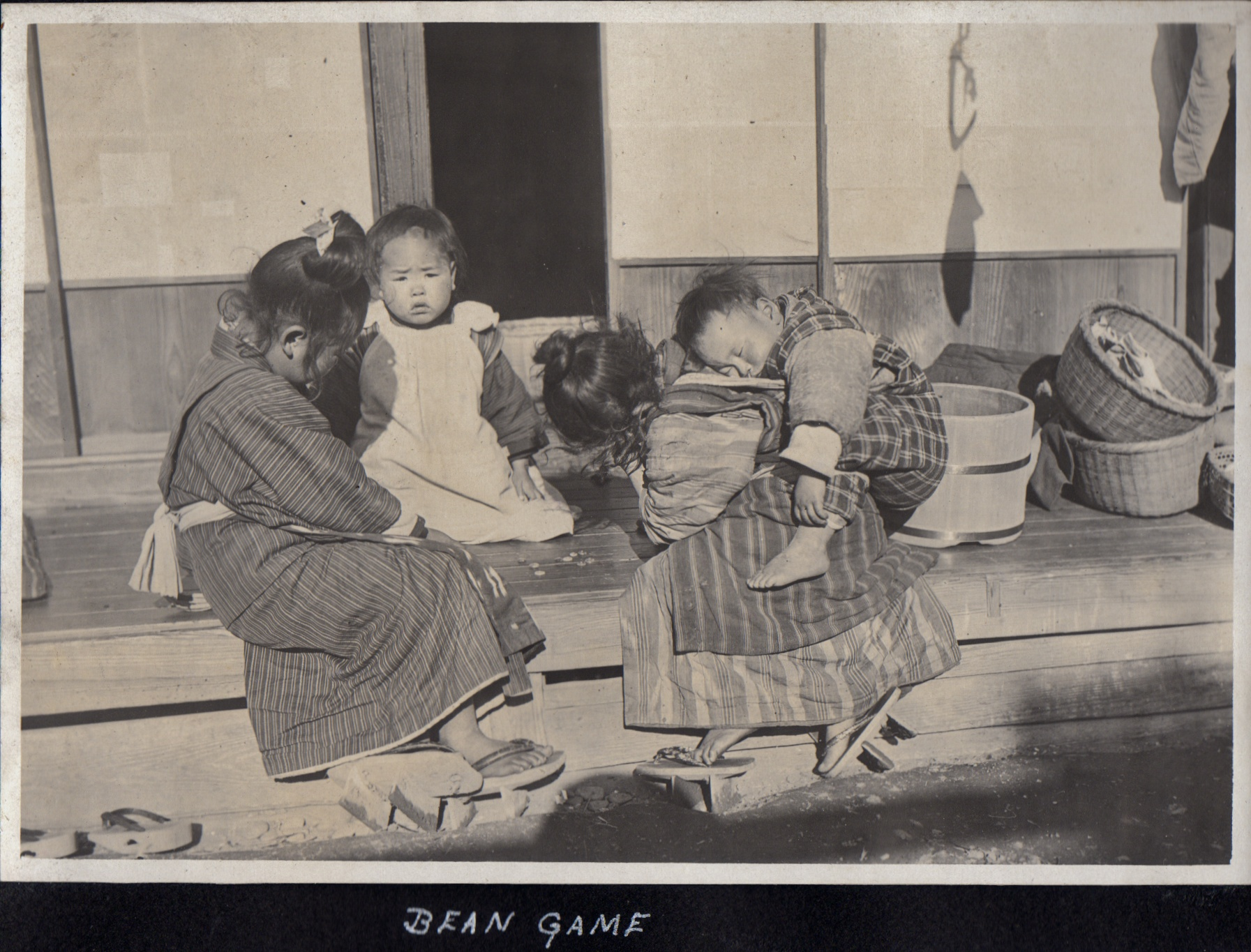
Children playing ohajiki, 1914

The game may have originated from the Chinese game of danqi (彈棋). Dating from the Western Wei dynasty (535-557 CE), it was played on a Go board, and the objective was to flick one's Go stones into the opponent's stones. Danqi was introduced to Japan during the Nara period (710–794 CE), and was described in the Tale of Genji (11th century CE).

During the Edo period, ohajiki became popular as an indoor game for girls, and was contrasted against more "aggressive" games for boys.

Historically, the shell of the kisago sea snail (Umbonium costatum) was used as ohajiki pieces. Pebbles, nuts, and go stones were also used. During the Meiji period, glass pieces became available, and plastic pieces were made in post-war Japan.
