= Nagane Shell Mound =

Archaeological site in Miyagi Prefecture, Japan

Nagane Shell Midden
- 長根貝塚 (Japanese)
- Location in Japan Nagane Shell Mound (Japan)
- 38°36′03″N 141°08′39″E
- Type: shell midden
- Periods: Jōmon period
- Location: Wakuya, Miyagi, Japan
- Region: Tōhoku region

Site notes
- Elevation: 25 m (82 ft)
- Public access: Yes (no facilities)

The Nagane Shell Midden (長根貝塚, Nagane Kaizuka) is an archaeological site consisting of a shell midden and the remains of an adjacent Jōmon period settlement located in what is now the town of Wakuya, Tōda District, Miyagi Prefecture in the Tōhoku region of northern Japan. It has been protected by the central government as a National Historic Site since 1970. It is the largest shell midden in Miyagi Prefecture.

== Overview ==
During the early to middle Jōmon period (approximately 4000 to 2500 BC), sea levels were five to six meters higher than at present, and the ambient temperature was also 2 deg C higher. During this period, the Tōhoku region was inhabited by the Jōmon people, many of whom lived in coastal settlements. The middens associated with such settlements contain bone, botanical material, mollusc shells, sherds, lithics, and other artifacts and ecofacts associated with the now-vanished inhabitants, and these features, provide a useful source into the diets and habits of Jōmon society.

Most of these middens are found along the Pacific coast of Japan, and the rocky ria coast of Miyagi Prefecture was densely settled from the early through late Jōmon period.

The Nagane Shell Midden is located in an inland location at an elevation of approximately thirteen meters on a low plateau south of Kabukiri Swamp; however was found to contain shells from seawater shellfish, such as oysters in its lowest strata, shellfish native to brackish water, such as shijimi in its middle layers and shells from freshwater mollusks and fish in its upper layers, indicating that the coastline in the region has receded. Aside from shellfish, the midden also contained the bones of deer and wild boar, and waterbirds including swans, geese and ducks. Other artifacts found in the 1968 excavation included pottery, stone implements, clay figurines, jewelry and vessels made from bone and animal horn. In addition, the foundations of two mid-Jōmon period pit dwellings were uncovered.

The midden is very large, extending for 300 meters east-west and 250 meters north-south in a “U”-shape, and spans the end of the early Jōmon period through the late Jōmon period (i.e. 6000 to 2300 years ago), with some smaller middens scattered to the west. The National Historic Site designation was extended in 1976 to cover outlying portions which had been discovered since 1970.

The site was backfilled after excavation, and there is now nothing to se at the site except for a monument and plaque. The site is located bout 30 minutes by car from Wakuya Station on the JR East Ishinomaki Line.

== See also ==
- List of Historic Sites of Japan (Miyagi)
- List of shell ring sites
