= Auld Mound =

Archaeological site in South Carolina, United States

- U.S. National Register of Historic Places
- Nearest city: Mount Pleasant, South Carolina
- Area: 2 acres (0.81 ha)
- MPS: Historic Resources of the Late Archaic-Early Woodland Period Shell Rings of South Carolina, ca. 1,000-2,200 years B.C
- NRHP reference No.: 70000583
- Added to NRHP: October 15, 1970

Auld Mound (38CH41), also known as Yough Hall Plantation Shell Ring, is a historic mound located near Mount Pleasant, Charleston County, South Carolina. It is one of 20 or more prehistoric shell rings located from the central coast of South Carolina to the central coast of Georgia. On average, it measures 174 feet in diameter and stands 2 to 3 feet high. The midden is largely composed of oyster shell.

It was listed on the National Register of Historic Places in 1970.
