= Puerto Hormiga archaeological site =

Archaeological site in Colombia

The Puerto Hormiga archaeological site is located in the Bolivar department, Colombia, in the lower Magdalena basin near the Caribbean coast. It dates to 4000-3100 BC. It is located in the Arjona municipality, 40 kilometres (25 mi) south east of Cartagena de Indias.

== Site ==
A shell ring of the Late Archaic period has been described at Puerto Hormiga. The Puerto Hormiga ring, found in a marsh, is composed primarily of clam shells. It has an outside diameter of 280 feet (85 m), a height of about 4 feet (1.2 m), and the base of the ring mound is 52 feet (16 m) to 75 feet (23 m) wide. It has a clear interior plaza. Sherds of fiber-tempered and sand-tempered pottery, as well as stone tools, were found associated with the shell ring. The earliest have been dated to 3794 BC. The fiber-tempered pottery is "crude", formed from a single lump of clay. Sand-tempered coiled ceramics have also been found at Puerto Hormiga.

== Interpretations ==
The site provides evidence of a developing semi-sedentary agricultural society, whose members also hunted and gathered shellfish. Middens of shells were found there. Other findings, such as potsherds and abundant lithic material, suggest that the nomadic peoples were beginning to complement their activities with small-scale horticulture and agriculture.
