= Fig Island =

Archaeological site in South Carolina, US

Coordinates: 32.5703°N 80.2153°W

- U.S. National Register of Historic Places
- U.S. National Historic Landmark
- Location within South Carolina Location within the United States
- Nearest city: Rockville, South Carolina
- MPS: Historic Resources of the Late Archaic-Early Woodland Period Shell Rings of South Carolina, ca. 1,000-2,200 years B.C
- NRHP reference No.: 70000585

Significant dates
- Added to NRHP: October 15, 1970
- Designated NHL: March 29, 2007

Fig Island, also known as 38CH42, is an archaeological site on the Atlantic Coast of South Carolina, consisting of three shell rings. Shell rings are curved shell middens wholly or partially surrounding a clear central area or plaza. The site includes one of the largest and most complex shell rings in North America, and one of the best preserved circular shell rings.

== Environment ==
More than 30 shell-ring sites are known along the Atlantic coast from South Carolina to Florida. Almost all of the sites date from 4500 to 5000 years ago for the earliest, to about 3000 years ago for the latest. (Note: One shell ring, the Grand site on Big Talbot Island in Florida, dates to 900-1250 in the Mississippian period. (Parsons:ix)) The Fig Island shell rings have been dated between 4400 years ago and 3600 years ago.

The Fig Island site is surrounded by a salt marsh on a peninsula extending from Edisto Island along the North Edisto River. The sea level on the South Carolina coast was as much as 1.2 meters lower when the Fig Island shell rings were built and occupied than it is now. The rise in sea level since then has led to the marsh expanding over what was probably dry land that connected Fig Island to Edisto Island in the past. The Fig Island rings cover an area of 300 by 275 meters.

== Shell rings ==
Fig Island 1 is a large and complex shell ring structure, perhaps the largest and most complex in North America. The main structure is a large ring that reaches up to six meters high on the main ring, with steep sides. The base of the main ring is about 40 meters wide. There are at least five smaller rings attached to the main ring. One of the attached rings is entirely within another ring. An adjacent shell mound is attached to the main ring by a shell causeway or ramp. There is an unusual feature at the high point of the main ring, which local residents suggested was a Civil War gun emplacement dug into the shell. As is typical of shell rings, there was little or no evidence of shells or occupational debris in the "plazas" enclosed by the main and attached rings. The complex is 157 meters wide on its longest axis. Based on mapping and probing to determine the depth of shell deposits, archaeologists have estimated that the ring complex contains 22,114 cubic meters of shell. Fig Island 1 has been dated to between 4000 and 3500 years ago.

The youngest radiocarbon dates at Fig Island are for one of the small rings attached to the main ring of Fig Island 1. Those dates are significantly later than the dates for Fig Island 2 and Fig Island 3. There were more artifacts found in this attached ring than elsewhere on Fig Island. This particular attached ring may be from an occupation that was later and of a different nature than that for the rest of Fig Island.

Fig Island 2 is circular or hexangular, more symmetrical than most shell rings, and in "an excellent state of preservation." There is a ramp on the north side of the ring that connects to a path of shell leading to the Fig Island 3 ring. This shell path is now below the surface of the marsh. There is a small gap in the ring opposite from the ramp leading to Fig Island 3. The ring is 82 meters in diameter and is between 10 and 25 meters wide at the base. The height varies between two meters and one meter above the ground. Archaeologists have calculated that the ring contains 2,178 cubic meters of shell. Fig Island 2 has been dated to between 4400 and 3600 years ago.

The smallest shell-ring on Fig Island is Fig Island 3. It is C-shaped, approximately half of a circle. There is no evidence that Fig Island 3 was ever more than a half circle. (Half-circle rings have been found at several sites in South Carolina and Georgia.) There is a ramp from the center of the half-circle connecting to the shell path from Fig Island 2. Pottery found in the two rings and radiocarbon dates, as well as the connecting path, indicate that Fig Island 2 and 3 were in use during the same period. Fig Island 3 is 49 meters in diameter, and is slightly less than 2 meters tall. Archaeologists have calculated that the ring contains 1,202 cubic meters of shell. The ring has been dated to between 4200 and 3800 years ago.

== Occupation ==
Ceramics found in the mounds are primarily Thoms Creek, with some Stallings. Both ceramic traditions fall in the Late Archaic period, about 3000 to 5000 years ago on the South Carolina coast and coastal plain. The earliest evidence for pottery along the South Carolina coast is from about 4200 years ago. (Note: Stallings (or Stallings Island) ceramics were primarily fiber-tempered, and are documented from about 4450 radiocarbon years Before Present, the oldest ceramics in North America. Thoms Creek ceramics closely resemble Stallings ceramics, but have more sand and less fiber as temper than Stallings ceramics. Thoms Creek ceramics were largely contemporary with Stallings ceramics, although no Thoms Creek ceramics have been found that are as early as the earliest Stallings. Thoms Creek ceramics overlapped Stallings ceramics in northern Georgia and southern South Carolina, but were the dominant tradition north of the Santee River and in North Carolina. (Saunders:19; Saunders and Hays:7-8))

Groups living along the coast had become mostly sedentary by the Late Archaic period, living in permanent villages while making occasional foraging trips. Archaeologists have debated whether the shell rings resulted from the simple accumulation of middens in conjunction with circular villages, or if they were deliberately built as monuments. The start of mound building in the lower Mississippi River valley and in Florida by about 6000 years ago is cited as increasing the plausibility that the shell-rings were also monumental architecture. Excavations of the Fig Island rings revealed little evidence of habitation on the rings, and circumstantial evidence of rapid deposition of large quantities of shells in deliberate creation of the rings.

Although the large size of shell middens gives the impression that the people associated with them lived primarily on shellfish, careful excavation of middens has revealed large quantities of fish bones, indicating that the people obtained more of their protein and calories from small fish than from shellfish. There is no evidence that the shell-ring dwellers practiced horticulture, but gathered plants were exploited. Nuts, fruits and seeds have been excavated from shell-ring sites.

Fig Island 2 and 3 were listed on the National Register of Historic Places in 1970, when Fig Island 1 and some of the site's other features had not yet been discovered. Further investigation beginning in 2002 identified Fig Island 1 and the mound and causeway features, leading to the site's designation as a National Historic Landmark in 2007.
