= Shimōsa Kokubun-ji =

Buddhist temple in Japan

- 下野国分寺
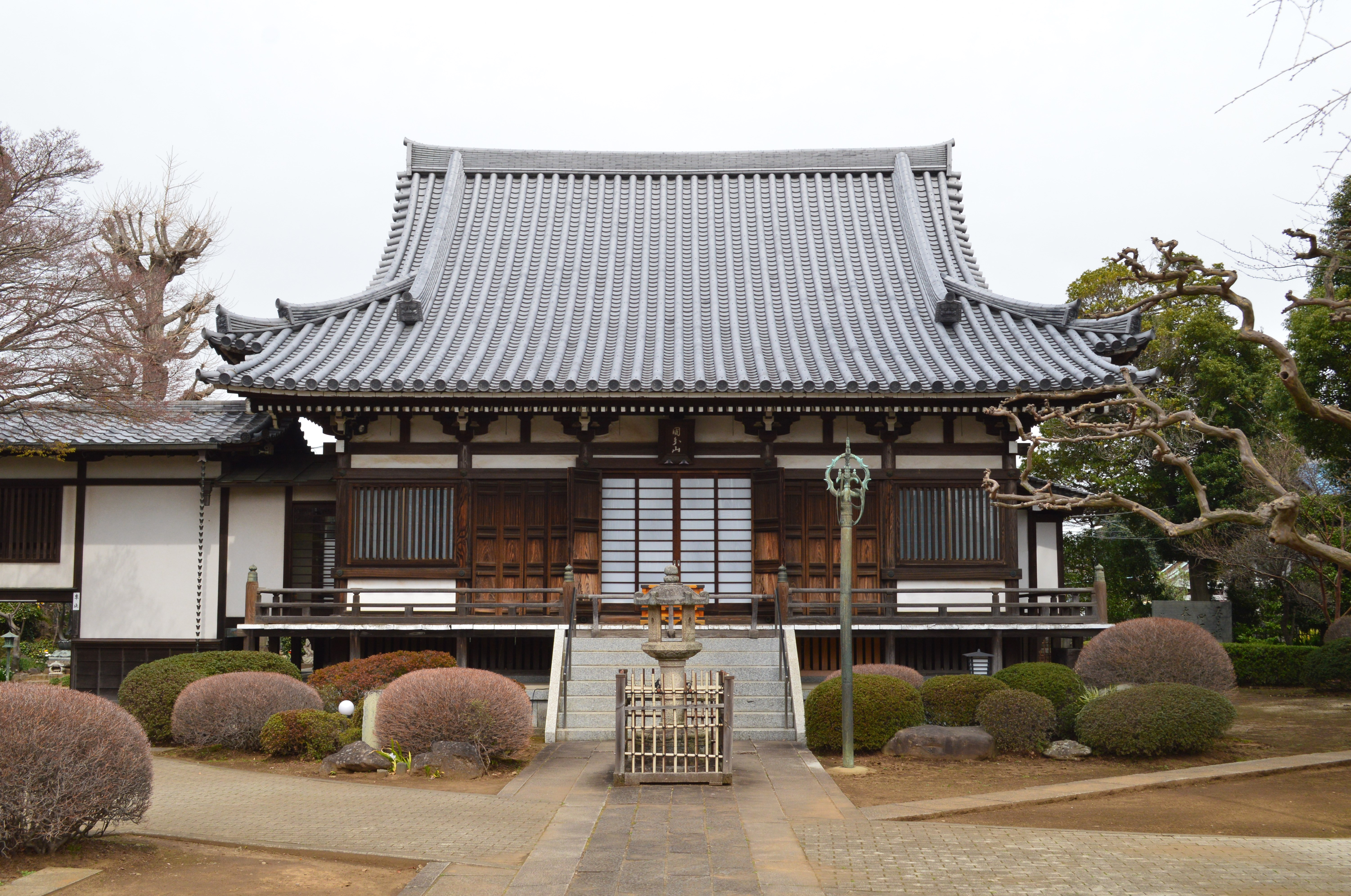
- Shimōsa Kokubun-ji Hondo

- Shimōsa Kokubun-ji Shimōsa Kokubun-ji (Japan)

Religion
- Affiliation: Buddhist
- Deity: Dainichi Nyorai
- Rite: Shingon-shu Buzan-ha
- Status: active

Location
- Location: Ichikawa, Chiba
- Country: Japan
- Coordinates: 35°44′39″N 139°55′09″E

Architecture
- Founder: c.Emperor Shōmu
- Completed: c.741AD
- National Historic Site of Japan

The Shimōsa Kokubun-ji (下総国分寺) is a Buddhist temple located in the city of Ichikawa, Chiba, Japan. It belongs to the Shingon-shū Buzan-ha sect and its honzon is an image of Dainichi Nyorai. The present temple is of uncertain foundation, but claims to be the direct descendant of the original Nara period provincial temple ("kokubunji") of former Shimōsa Province. which fell into ruins sometime during the Kamakura period. The Nara-period temple ruins were designated a National Historic Site in 1967, and the area under protection includes the site of a kiln used to produce roof tiles used by the temple. The area designated was expanded in 2002

== Ancient Shimōsa Kokubun-ji ==
The Shoku Nihongi records that in 741, as the country recovered from a major smallpox epidemic, Emperor Shōmu ordered that a monastery and nunnery be established in every province, the kokubunji (国分寺). These temples had the purpose of promoting Buddhism as the national religion of Japan and standardizing control of imperial rule over the provinces.

The Shimōsa Kokubun-ji was located at the southwestern end of the Shimōsa Plateau at an elevation of 20 meters on the coast of Tokyo Bay and northwest of the city center of modern Ichikawa. The surrounding area is near the presumed site of the Shimōsa provincial capital. The foundations of the Nara-period pagoda, the Kondō, and Lecture Hall were discovered in an archaeological excavation conducted from 1965 to 1966 by the Ichikawa City Board of Education The Kondō was found to have dimensions of 31.5 meters east-to-west x 19 meters north-to-south and is located under the current Main Hall of the modern temple. The Lecture Hall was 26 meters east-to-west by 18 meters north-to-south, and is under the current cemetery. The pagoda foundation was 18 meters square. The arrangement of the buildings was patterned after that of Hōryū-ji in Ikaruga, Nara, which is rare for a kokubunji temple, whose typical template was the great national temple of Tōdai-ji in Nara. In a further excavation from 1989 to 1994, the extent of the temple compound was confirmed to be 300 meters east-to-west by 350 meters north-to-south. A large variety of artifacts such as earthenware, metalware, ceramics and roof tiles have been discovered. In the near vicinity was the ruins of a noborigama-style kiln used to make the roof tiles used by the temple. The pattern of the eaves tiles was not the lotus pattern that was standard for temples at this time, but was based on the hōsōge flower design (an imaginary peony-like floral pattern), which further points to the unusual nature of this temple.

Temple legend states without any documentary evidence that it was founded by the wandering holy ascetic Gyōki, and as was often the case, later legends changed this attribution to Kūkai. The history of the temple and nunnery is unclear, but while it was flourishing in the 9th century, it has shown signs of decline since the 10th century. The temple is mentioned in the mid-Kamakura period in various documents and records, but due to repeated disasters (fires in 1336 1479 and 1717 have been recorded), most of the temple records have been lost. It appears possible that portions of the original temple survived until at least the Meiji period. A large fire in 1891 destroyed almost all of the temple.

The present main hall is a modern design by the noted architect Hideto Kishida in 1942, and is located precisely above the site of the ancient Kondō. The temple is approximately 4.5 kilometers (or nine minutes by car) from JR East Utsunomiya Line (Tohoku Main Line) Koganei Station.

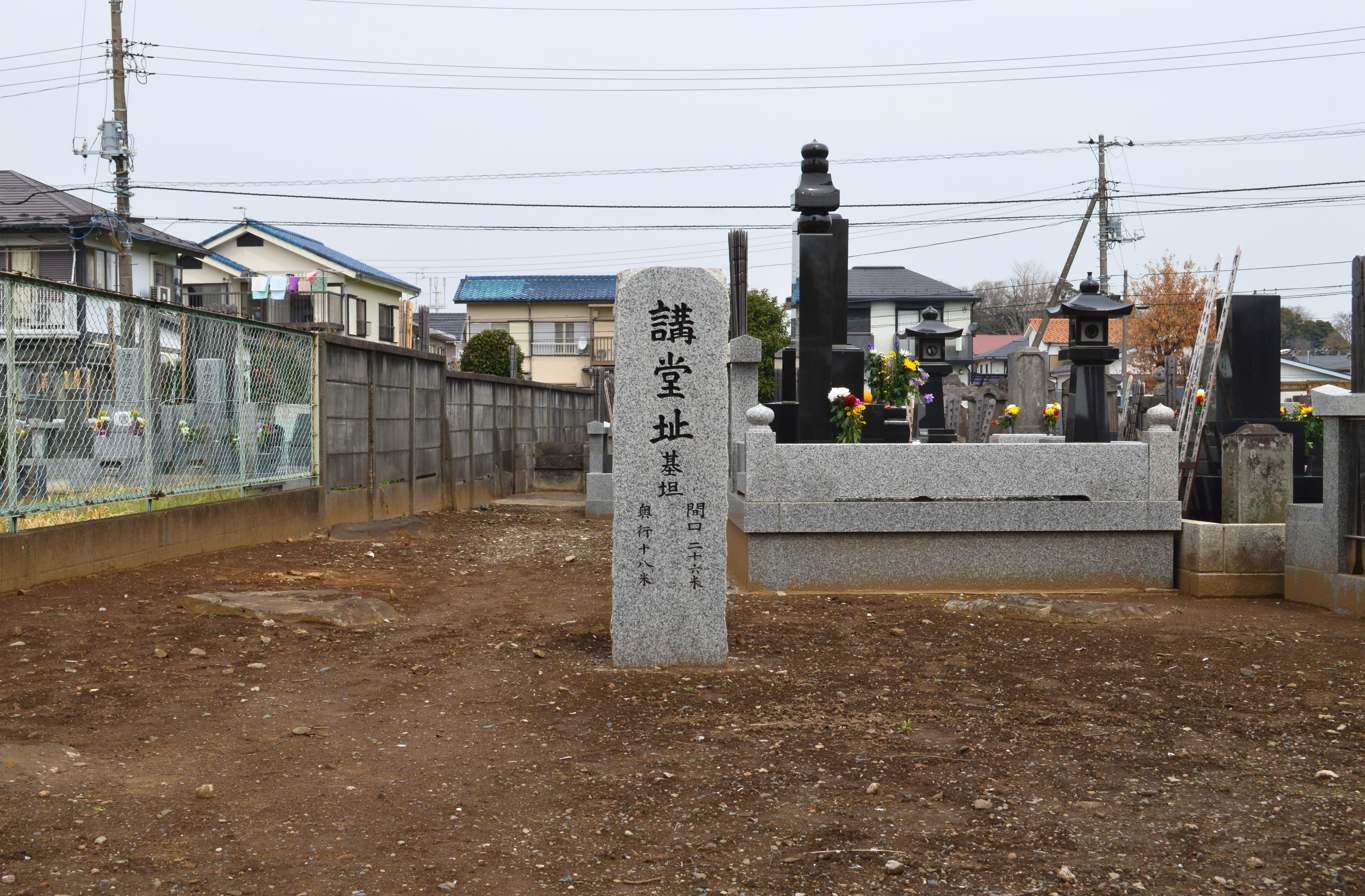
Site of Lecture Hall

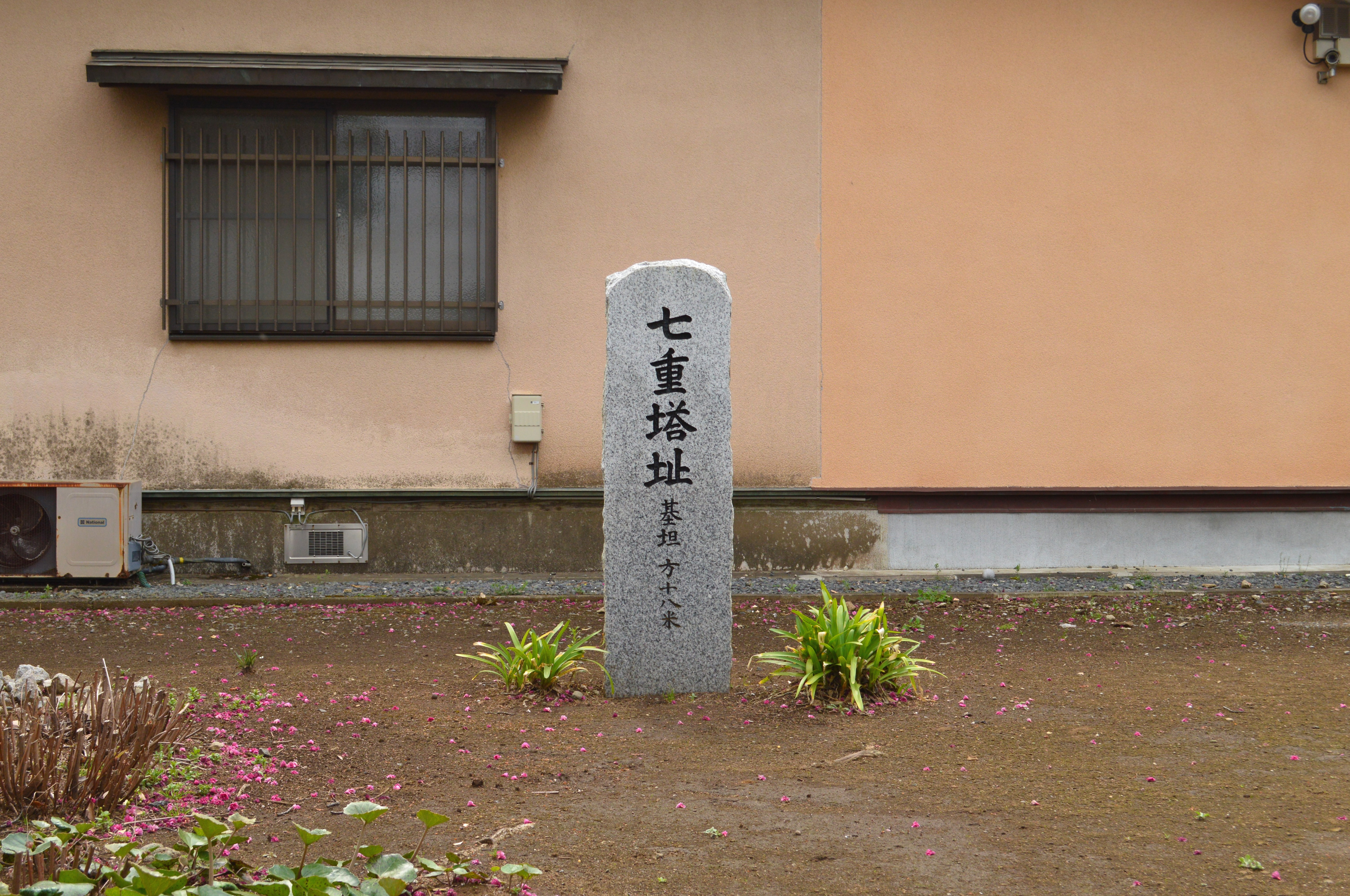
Site of Pagoda

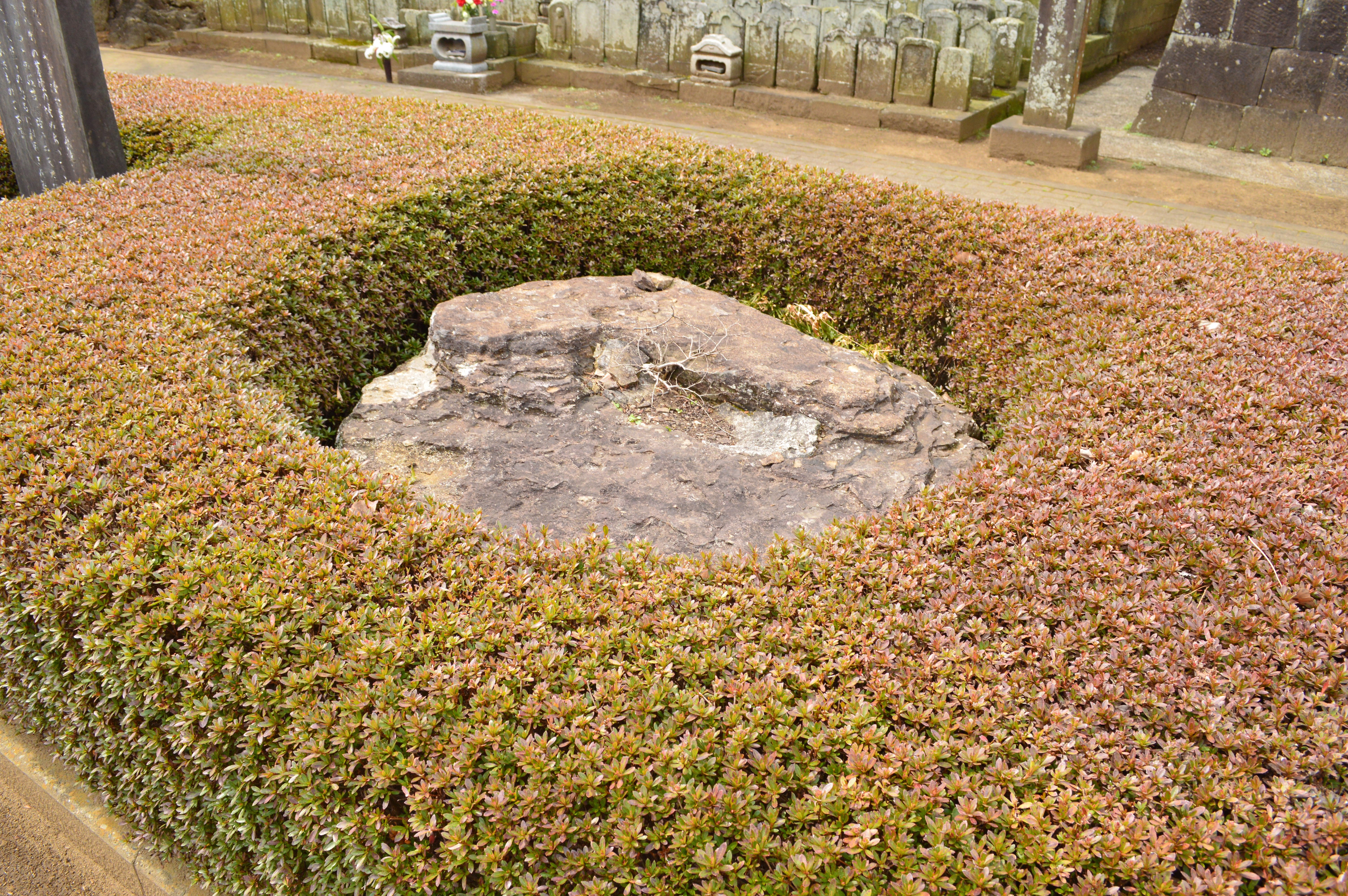
Foundation of Pagoda

== Ancient Shimōsa Kokubun-niji ==
The ruins of the provincial nunnery associated with the Shimōsa Kokubun-ji, the Shimōsa Kokubun-niji (下野国分尼寺) are located approximately 500 meters to the northwest of the Shimōsa Kokubun-ji ruins. The temple occupied an irregular layout surrounded by a moat, with an east-to-west dimension of 303 meters, and a north-to-south dimension of 340 meters. The layout of the temple was almost identical to that of the Shimōsa Kokubun-ji, but on a smaller scale and lacking in a pagoda. An excavation was carried out in 1932, during which the foundations of the Kondō, Lecture Hall, Middle Gate, South Gate. Fragments of roof tiles with the word "nunnery" was discovered, and unlike the Shimōsa Kokubun-ji, both lotus-style and hōsōge-style eave tiles have been found. The Kondō had dimensions of 25.5 meters by 22.4 meters. The compound was surrounded by a moat, of which the north, east and south sides have been confirmed. The ruins were a designated historic site in 1967.

Currently, the ruins are managed as the Shimōsa Kokubun-niji Ruins Park (下総国分尼寺跡公園) by Ichikawa City.

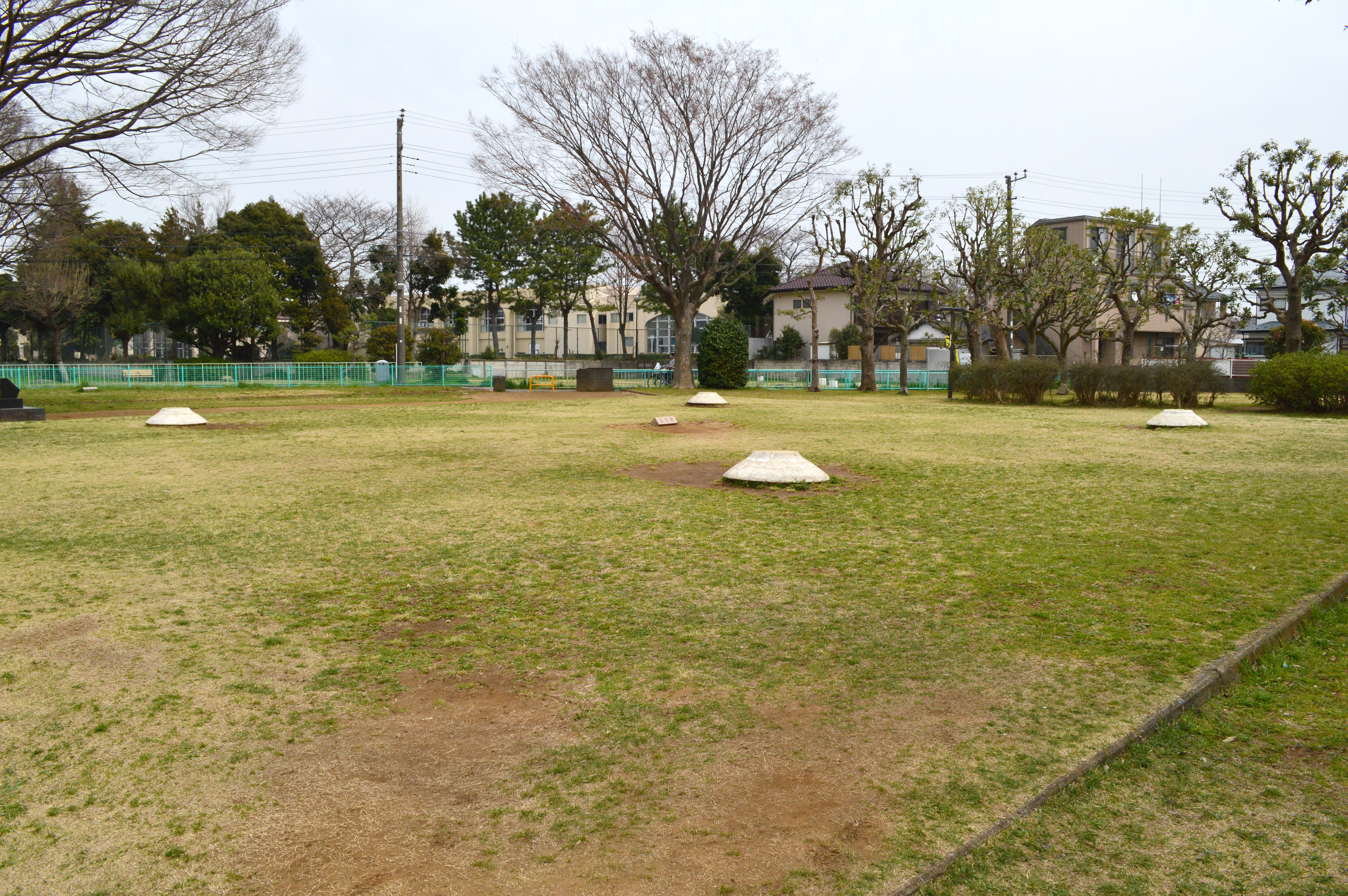
Site of the Kondō

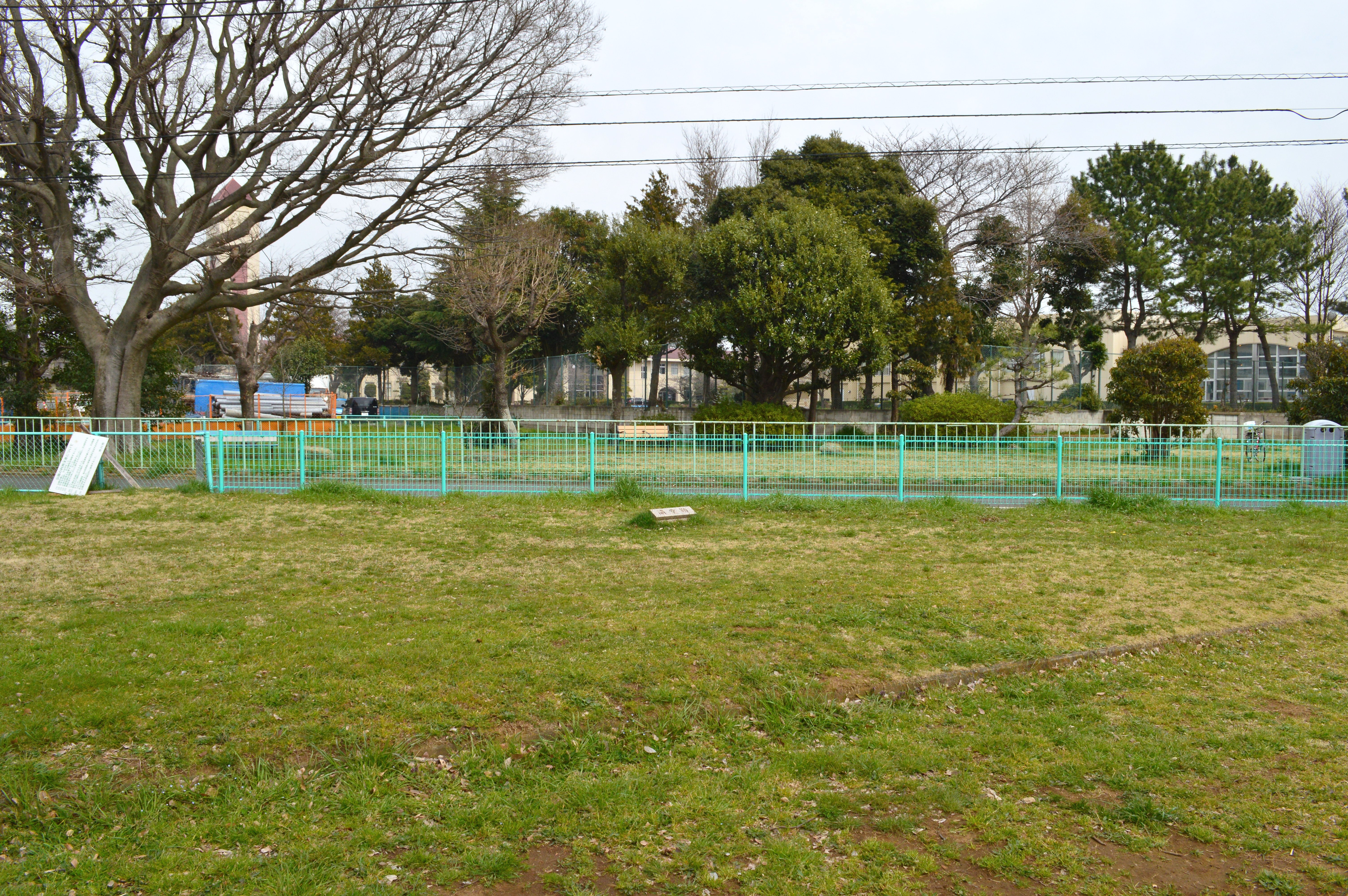
Site of the Lecture Hall

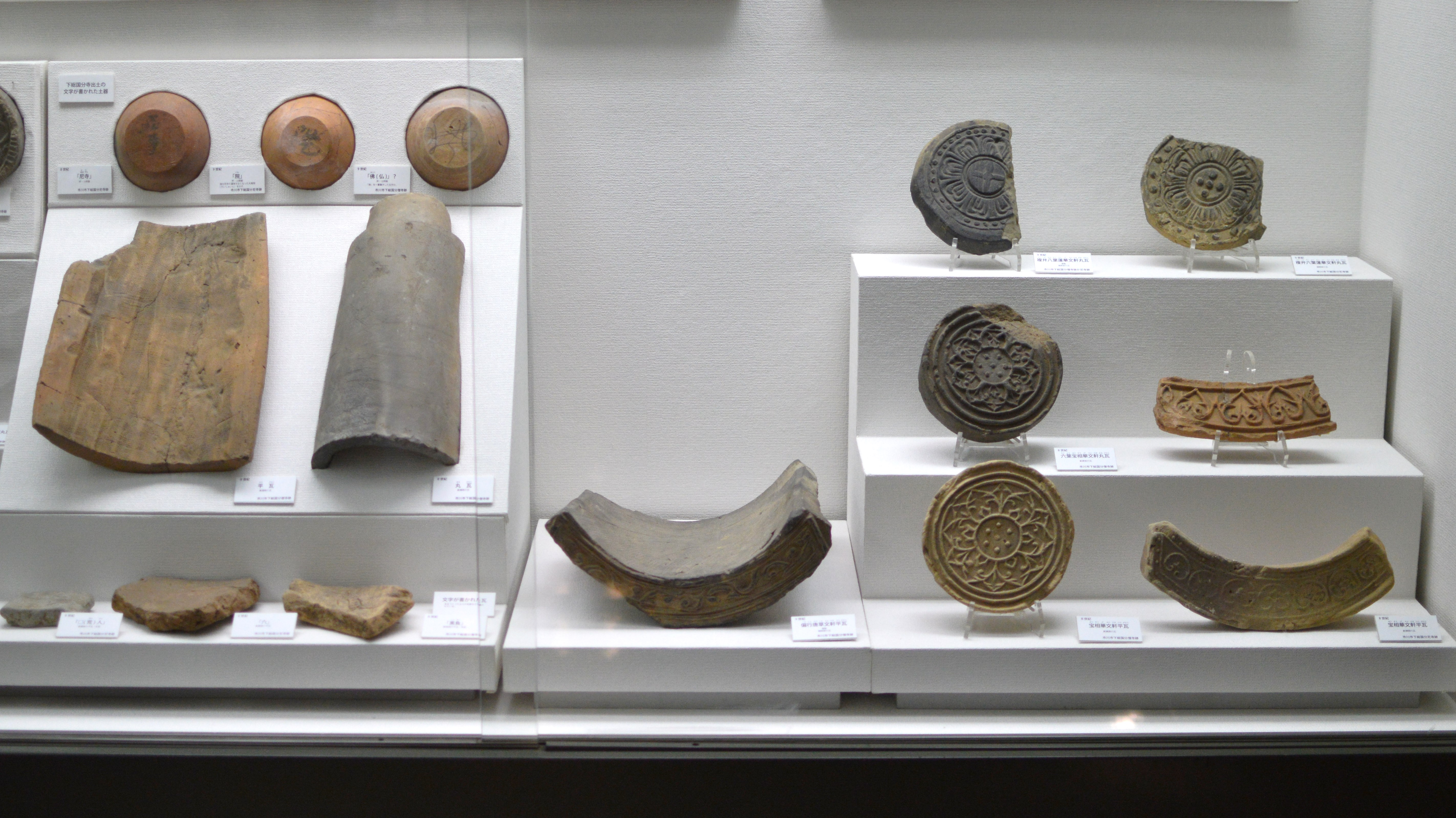
Recovered artifacts

== See also ==
- Provincial temple
- List of Historic Sites of Japan (Chiba)
