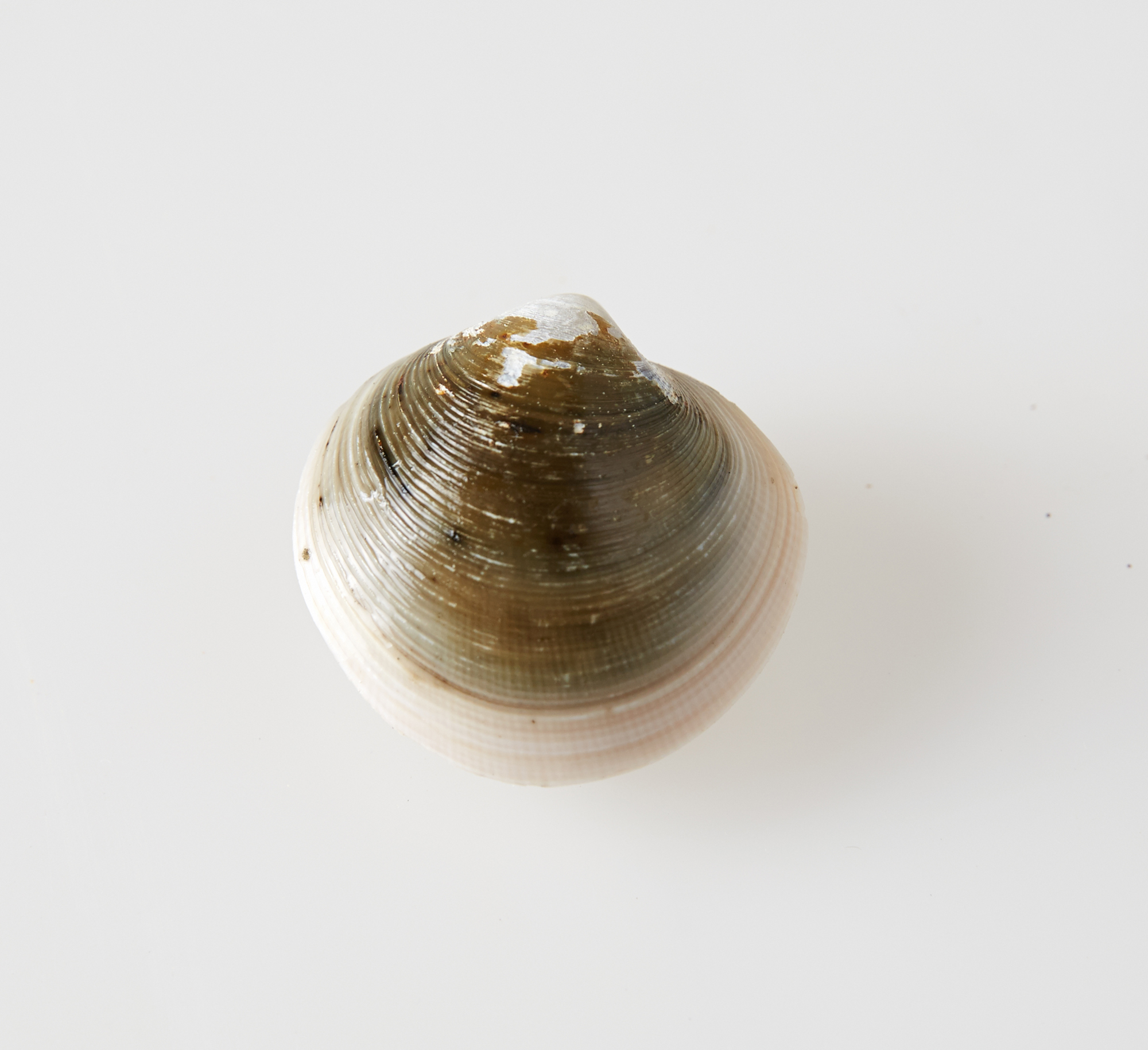

Scientific classification
- Domain: Eukaryota
- Kingdom: Animalia
- Phylum: Mollusca
- Class: Bivalvia
- Order: Venerida
- Family: Veneridae
- Genus: Cyclina
- Species: C. sinensis

Binomial name
- Cyclina sinensis (Gmelin, 1791)

Synonyms
- Callista sinensis Gmelin; Cyclina bombycina Römer; Cyclina pectunculus Römer; Cyprina tenuistria Lamarck; Venus (Cyclina) intumescens Römer; Venus chinensis Dillwyn; Venus sinensis Gmelin

= Cyclina sinensis =

Species of bivalve

Cyclina sinensis, commonly known as Chinese venus, black clam, iron clam, and Korean cyclina clam, is a clam species in the venus clam family, Veneridae. It mostly lives in the flats on the coast of seas in East Asia, such as the Yellow Sea and the West sea.
