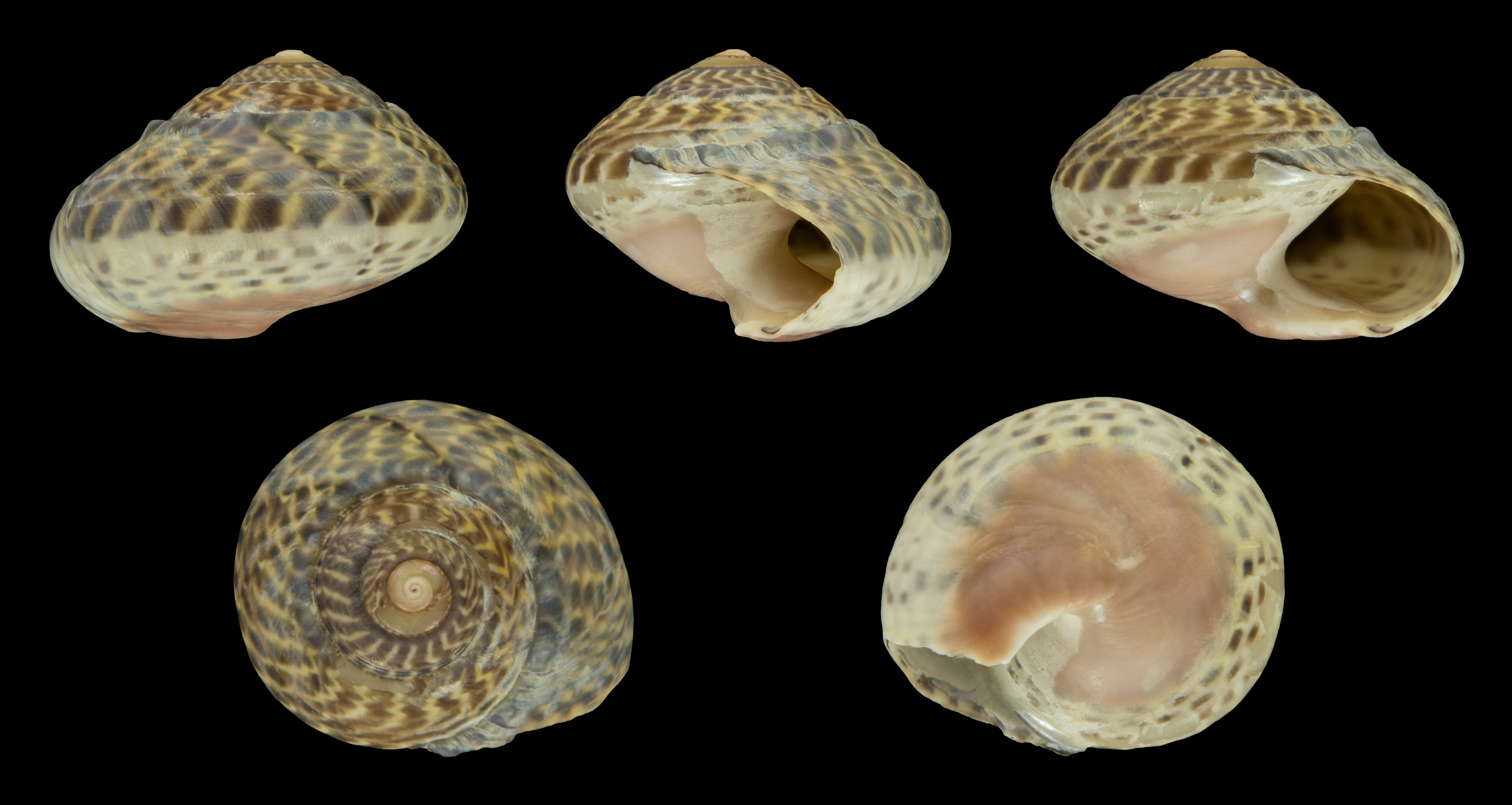

Scientific classification
- Kingdom: Animalia
- Phylum: Mollusca
- Class: Gastropoda
- Subclass: Vetigastropoda
- Order: Trochida
- Superfamily: Trochoidea
- Family: Trochidae
- Genus: Umbonium
- Species: U. costatum

Binomial name
- Umbonium costatum (Kiener, 1839)

Synonyms
- Globulus costata Valenciennes, 1838; Rotella costata Kiener, 1839 (original combination); Umbonium (Suchium) costatum (Valenciennes, A. in Kiener, L.C., 1838)

= Umbonium costatum =

Species of gastropod

Umbonium costatum is a species of sea snail, a marine gastropod mollusk in the family Trochidae, the top snails.

== Description ==
The size of the shell varies between 12 mm and 25 mm. The heavy, solid shell has a depressed shape. Its spire is low-conoidal, the periphery rounded. The color pattern is whitish or light yellow, closely tessellated all over with blackish-olive or reddish-brown squarish spots. The tessellated color-markings sometimes form subcontinuous oblique bands. The surface is shining and polished, with strong spiral grooves above, generally 4 to 6 on the body whorl. The sutures are narrowly impressed, with a rather wide margin below them, which often shows a slight tendency to be tuberculate. The base of the shell is smooth, tessellated around the irregularly convex, flesh-colored central callus. The shell contains six whorls, the last a little concave above, convex beneath. The subquadrate aperture is pearly inside. The circular callus is heaviest in front of the aperture and behind the columellar lip.

== Distribution ==
This species occurs in the Sea of Japan and in the East China Sea.

== In culture ==
In Japan, the snail is called kisago, and its shell was once used as pieces for ohajiki, a children's game similar to marbles.
