= Shell ring =

Type of shell mound

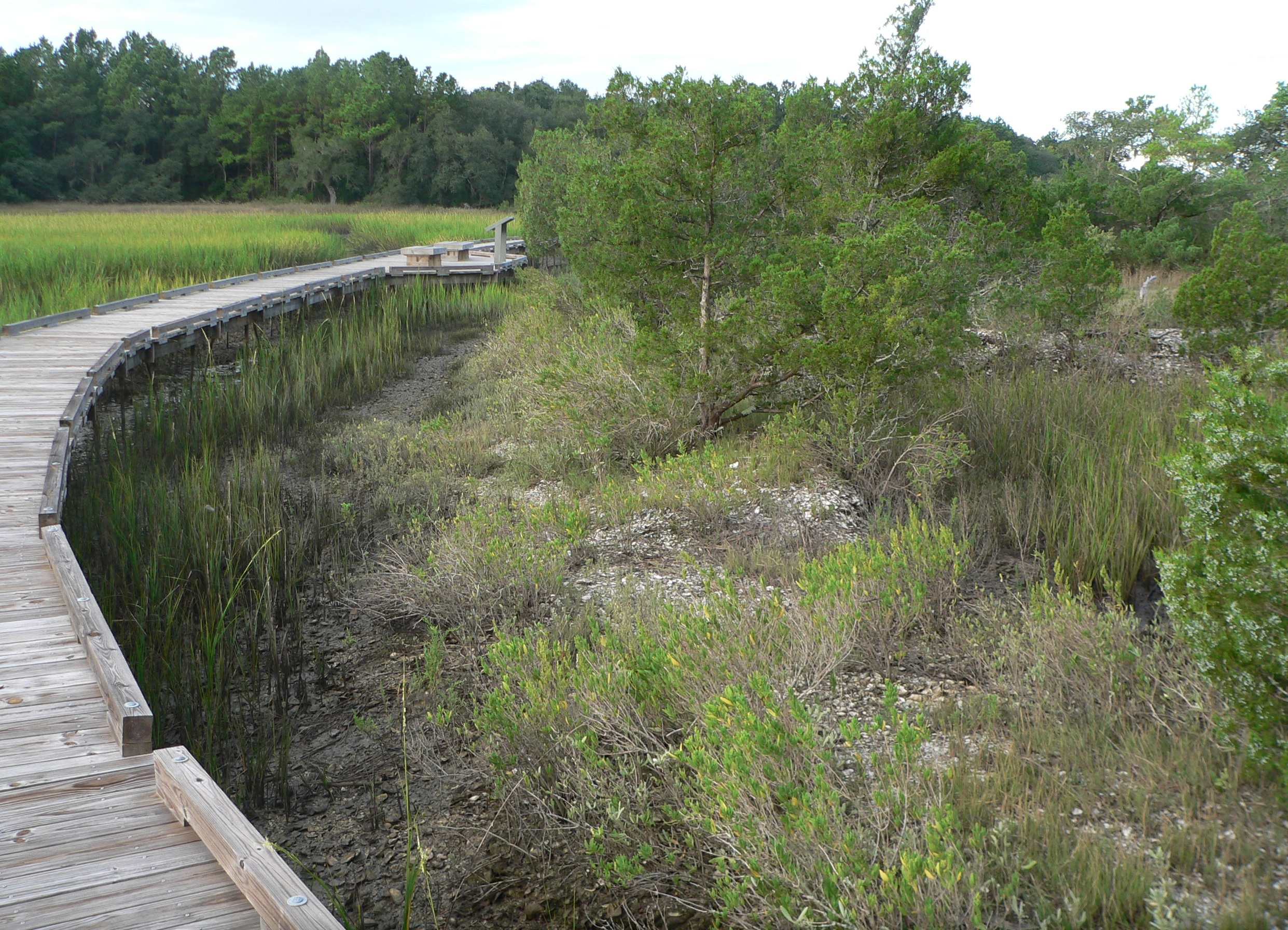
Sewee Shell Ring, located south of Awendaw, South Carolina in Francis Marion National Forest

Shell rings are archaeological sites with curved shell middens completely or partially surrounding a clear space. The rings were sited next to estuaries that supported large populations of shellfish, usually oysters. Shell rings have been reported in several countries, including Colombia, Peru, Japan, and the southeastern United States. Archaeologists continue to debate the origins and use of shell rings.

Across what is now the southeastern United States, starting around 4000 BCE, people exploited wetland resources, creating large shell middens. Middens developed along rivers, but there is limited evidence of Archaic peoples along coastlines prior to 3000 BCE. Archaic sites on the coast may have been inundated by rising sea levels (one site in 15 to 20 feet of water off St. Lucie County, Florida has been dated to 2800 BCE). Starting around 3000 BCE evidence of large-scale exploitation of oysters appears. During the period 3000 BCE to 1000 BCE shell rings, large shell middens more or less surrounding open centers, developed along the coast of the Southeastern United States. These shell rings are numerous in South Carolina and Georgia, but are also found scattered around the Florida peninsula. Some sites also have sand or sand-and-shell mounds associated with shell rings. Sites such as Horr's Island, in southwest Florida, supported sizable mound-building communities year-round. Four shell and/or sand mounds on Horr's Island have been dated to between 4870 and 4270 Before Present (BP).

Groups living along the coast had become mostly sedentary by the Late Archaic period, living in permanent villages while making occasional foraging trips. Archaeologists have debated whether the shell rings resulted from the simple accumulation of middens in conjunction with circular villages, or if they were deliberately built as monuments. The start of mound building in the lower Mississippi River valley and in Florida by about 6000 years ago is cited as increasing the plausibility that the shell-rings were also monumental architecture. Excavations of the Fig Island rings revealed little evidence of habitation on the rings, and circumstantial evidence of rapid deposition of large quantities of shells in deliberate creation of the rings.

== Archaeological sites ==
Sites in Colombia, Peru, and Japan, as well as in the southeastern United States, have been identified as shell rings. Residents of and visitors to the Sea Islands of South Carolina and Georgia had long noticed circular shell mounds on some of the islands. The first written accounts of shell rings in South Carolina and Georgia appeared early in the 19th century. Archaeologists surveyed some shell rings near the end of the 19th century, but the first reported scientific excavation of a shell ring in the United States did not occur until 1933. Scientific excavation of shell mounds in Japan began in the 1920s.

About 60 shell rings had been identified in the southeastern United States by 2002. Most date from the Late Archaic period (c. 3000 BCE to 1000 BCE), but shell rings were also constructed during the Woodland (c. 1000 BCE to 1000 CE) and Mississippian (c. 800 - 1500) periods. Close to 100 circular and horseshoe-shaped shell mounds have been identified in the Kantō region of Japan (where a large majority of Japanese shell mounds are found). Shell rings in Japan have been dated from late in the Early Jōmon period until early in the Late Jōmon period (from before 3000 BCE until after 1000 BCE). While there are reports of a number of shell ring sites in Colombia, only the Puerto Hormiga shell ring (c. 3000 BCE to 2500 BCE) has been described in the archaeological literature. (Note: Some North American archaeologists have doubts about the ringed nature of the Puerto Hormiga ring.(Lawrence and Wrightson:3)) Archaeologists have continued to identify and investigate additional shell ring sites into the 21st century.

Shell rings in the United States may form a complete ring, or be open, C-shaped, or U- or horseshoe-shaped. They may form a nearly perfect circle, or an oval. In almost all cases, the central area or "plaza" contains little or no shell or occupational debris. Most shell rings in the United States consist primarily of oyster shells, but may include periwinkles, razor clams, whelks, ribbed mussels, hard-shelled clams (quahogs), and blue and stone crab claws and shell bits. The Common orient clam is the most common component in shell mounds in Japan. Other shells found in Japanese mounds include those of sea snails, surf clams (Mactra veneriformes), and Japanese littleneck clams (Tapes japonica).

Some shell ring sites have multiple rings. Some more-or-less equal-sized rings may be joined together in a "figure-8", as with the Skull Creek 1 and 2 and Coosaw 1 and 2 rings in South Carolina, or be touching, as with the two circular mounds in the Kasori shellmound in Japan. Smaller rings may be attached to a main ring, as at Fig Island 1 in South Carolina and the Rollins shell ring in Florida. Shell rings in southwest Florida are often associated with large mounds and other shell works. Shell rings in Georgia average 53 metres (174 ft) in diameter, and those in South Carolina 64 metres (210 ft) in diameter. The U-shaped shell rings in Florida described as of 2006 averaged 178 metres (584 ft) in length. Middle and Late Jomon shell middens in Japan are often circular or horseshoe-shaped, typically about 150 metres (490 ft) in diameter and may be up to 200 metres (660 ft) in diameter.

The known shell rings are various states of preservation. Rings have been impacted by rising sea levels, erosion, plowing, and coastal development. Shell rings, along with other shell mounds, have been mined for shell to be used in road paving and other construction projects. Shell rings in Peru have been particularly impacted by mining.

== Construction and use ==
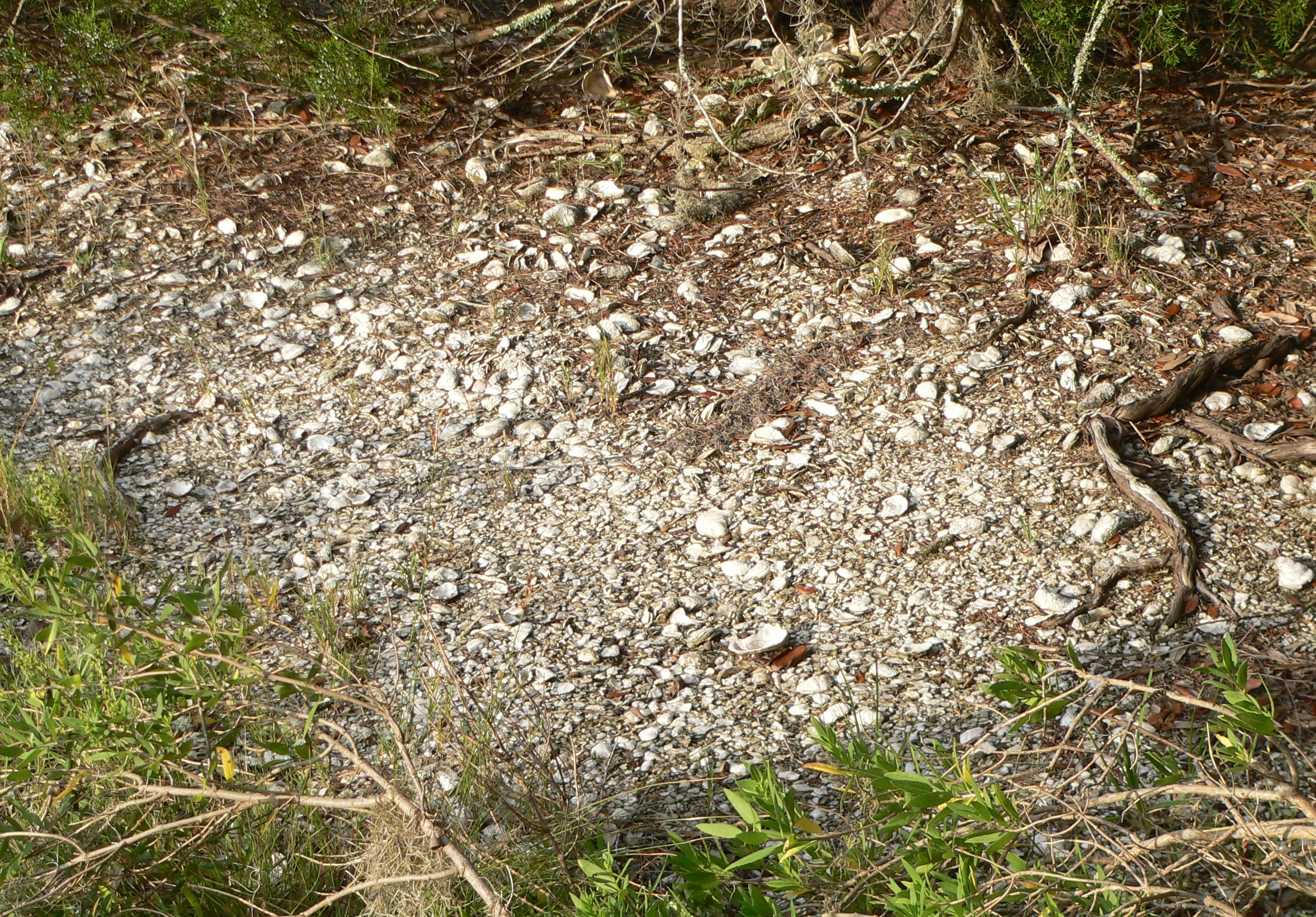
Sewee Shell Ring, detail of southeast side, showing shells of which ring is made.

Archaeologists debate whether shell rings developed incidentally from shells discarded around circular villages, or were intentionally built, perhaps for ceremonial purposes. Over the years archaeologists and others have proposed many uses for shell rings, including recreational ("gaming arenas"), ceremonial, "houses of state", astronomical observatories, religious, torture chambers, and fish traps. Many archaeologists believe that shell rings developed incidentally from shells discarded around circular villages of egalitarian hunter-gatherers. Supporting the assessment that the shell ring builders were egalitarian is the absence of prestige artifacts or burials associated with the rings.

Earthen mounds, including circular and horseshoe-shaped mounds, are found in Japan away from the estuaries that supported shell mounds. Evidence of pit houses in and adjacent to circular and horseshoe-shaped earthen mounds has been cited as evidence that the mounds resulted from normal settlements rather than construction for ceremonial purposes. Repeated construction of pit houses would have left dirt piled up around a village. This explanation of the development of mounds as a result of digging pit houses has been extended to also explain circular and horseshoe-shaped shell mounds. Several ring-shaped, C-shaped or horseshoe-shaped earthen mounds have been identified at sites in inland peninsular Florida, such as the River Styx archaeological site. Woodland period rings in the United States incorporated more soil into the rings, blurring the distinction between earthen and shell rings.

The evidence of the shell rings for residential vs. ceremonial origins in the United States is mixed. Some shell rings, such as Sapelo 3, Lighthouse Point, and Stratton Place, had houses on the crest of the rings. Other rings, such as Horr's Island, Sewee, Sapelo 1, and Fig Island 1 had rings that were too steep for building on the crest. The top part of Fig Island 1 was built up with shells mined from other middens. Villages have been found near the rings at Horr's Island, Rollins, Guana, and Sapelo 1. No living site has been found at or near the Sewee, Joseph Reed, and Hill Cottage rings. The Horr's Island, Joseph Reed, and Fig Island sites supported large, settled populations.

Russo points out that, while a circular shape implies an egalitarian society, asymmetry in a ring may represent occupation by a non-egalitarian society. Open rings are often highest and widest at the point opposite the opening. High status members of the community would have their houses on the highest point of a ring. There are also geographical variations. The Late Archaic shell rings in Florida are larger in area than those in Georgia and South Carolina, although the volume of shells in a ring is about the same in Florida and in South Carolina. The rings in Florida are also U-shaped, while the rings in Georgia and South Carolina are circular or C-shaped. The U-shaped rings in Florida have their open ends oriented to dry land, while the C-shaped rings in South Carolina are oriented to marshes. Russo interprets the difference to the sites in Florida having to accommodate larger and more complex (less egalitarian) communities than those that used the sites in Georgia and South Carolina. Sites in Florida may have accommodated an increased population (resident on the ring or attending ceremonies at the ring) by extending the arms of the ring, while sites in South Carolina may have accommodated larger populations by building new rings.

Jadrnicek proposed an odorous order theory regarding shell ring formation November 2019. The theory suggests ring formations are caused by the odor of the shell wastes. As waste accumulated it would eventually rot and smell. Feasting rotated to avoid odors of rotting waste. Rotation of feasts occurred around a central access point usually a tidal stream leading to a circular form to the wastes deposited. Geophysical surveys showing intermittent deposition and pit formation under and in the interior of shell rings supports the theory

Although the large size of shell middens gives the impression that the people associated with them lived primarily on shellfish, careful excavation of middens has revealed large quantities of fish bones, indicating that the people obtained more of their protein and calories from small fish than from shellfish. There is no evidence that the shell-ring dwellers practiced horticulture, but gathered plants were exploited. Nuts, fruits and seeds have been excavated from shell-ring sites.

== Ring middens ==
More than 20 Swift Creek and Weeden Island archaeological sites along the Gulf coast of the Florida panhandle have ring middens. Ring middens are distinct from shell rings in that shells are sparse or missing from parts of each ring, and many rings have a low profile, so that the shape of the ring is defined by the limits of the midden's deposits. The ring middens are rarely closed circles, but may consist of a semi-circle or discontinuous segments of a circle.
