= Mutsu Kokubun-niji =

- 陸奥国分尼寺
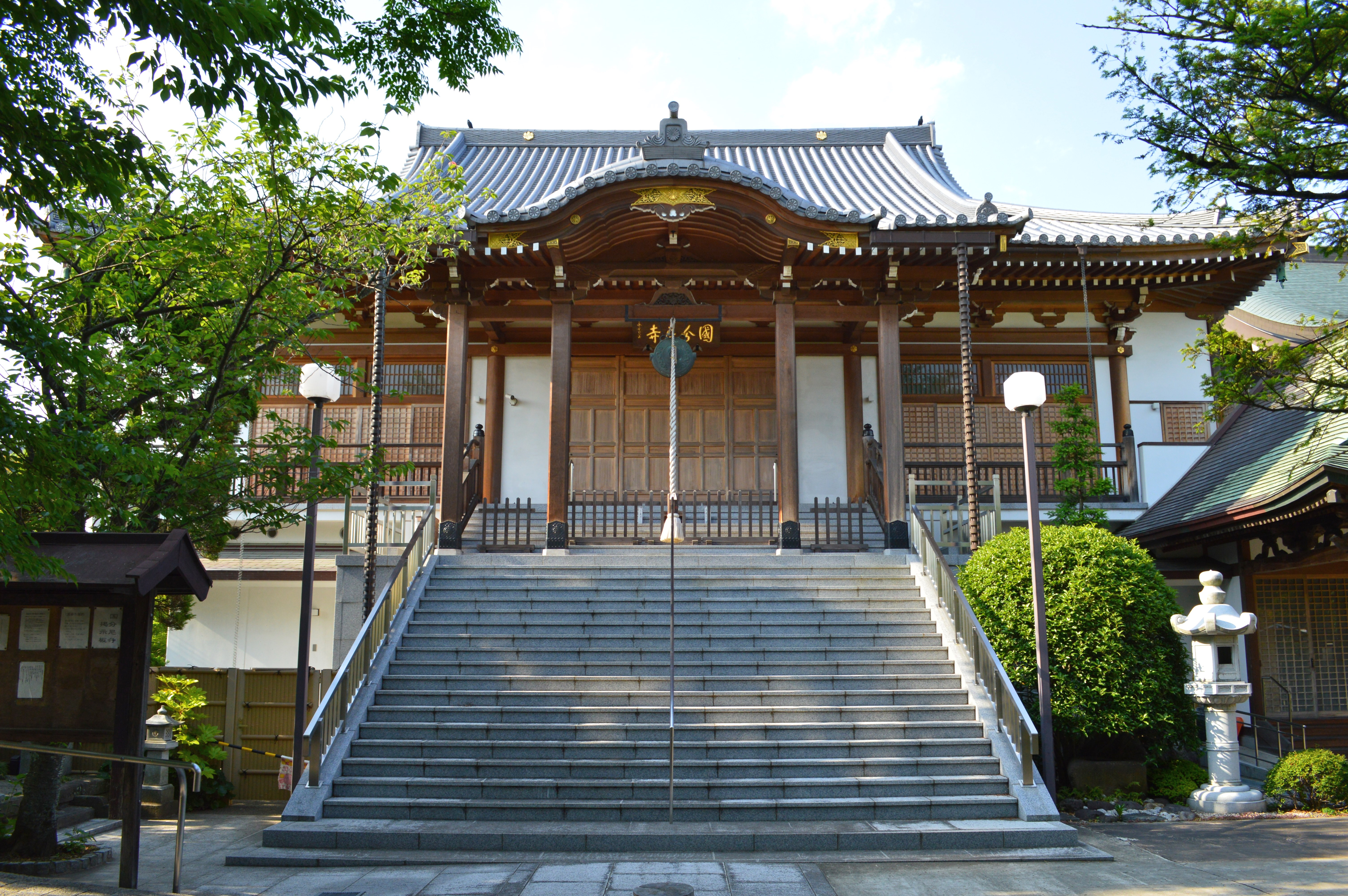
- Mutsu Kokubun-niji Hondo

- Mutsu Kokubun-niji Mutsu Kokubun-niji (Japan)

Religion
- Affiliation: Buddhist
- Deity: Kannon Bostasu
- Rite: Sōtō
- Status: active

Location
- Location: 33-26 Shirahagi-cho, Wakabayashi-ku, Sendai-shi, Miyagi-ken
- Country: Japan
- Interactive map of Mutsu Kokubun-niji
- Coordinates: 38°15′3.97″N 140°54′34.28″E

Architecture
- Founder: Emperor Shōmu
- Completed: 741

Mutsu Kokubun-niji (陸奥国分尼寺) is a Buddhist temple in Wakabayashi-ku, Sendai, Japan, belonging to the Sōtō Zen sect, and is the provincial convent ("kokubun-niji") of former Mutsu Province. The grounds of the temple are a National Historic Site.

== History ==
The Shoku Nihongi records that in 741, as the country recovered from a major smallpox epidemic, Emperor Shōmu ordered that a monastery and convent be established in every province, the kokubunji (国分寺).

In the late Nara period, after the establishment of a centralized government under the Ritsuryō system, the imperial court sent a number of military expeditions to what is now the Tōhoku region of northern Japan to bring the local Emishi tribes under its control. After the establishment of Taga Castle, Yamato forces gradually pushed into the hinterland of what is now Miyagi Prefecture, establishing several fortified settlements along with several large-scale Buddhist temples. The Mutsu Kokubun-niji was located approximately 700 meter east of the Mutsu Kokubun-ji and 10 kilometers from Taga Castle.

The temple claims that it was originally of the Tendai sect, and that it was destroyed in perhaps the Kamakura period, and was restored during the late Muromachi period as a monastery by the chieftain of the Kokubunji clan, a local warlord who ruled the area where the provincial temples were once located. It converted to Sōtō sect in 1570. The temple was destroyed and rebuilt on several occasions, and most of its written records have been lost; however, it enjoyed the patronage of the ruling Date clan of Sendai Domain during the Edo period.

=== Mutsu Kokubun-niji ruins ===
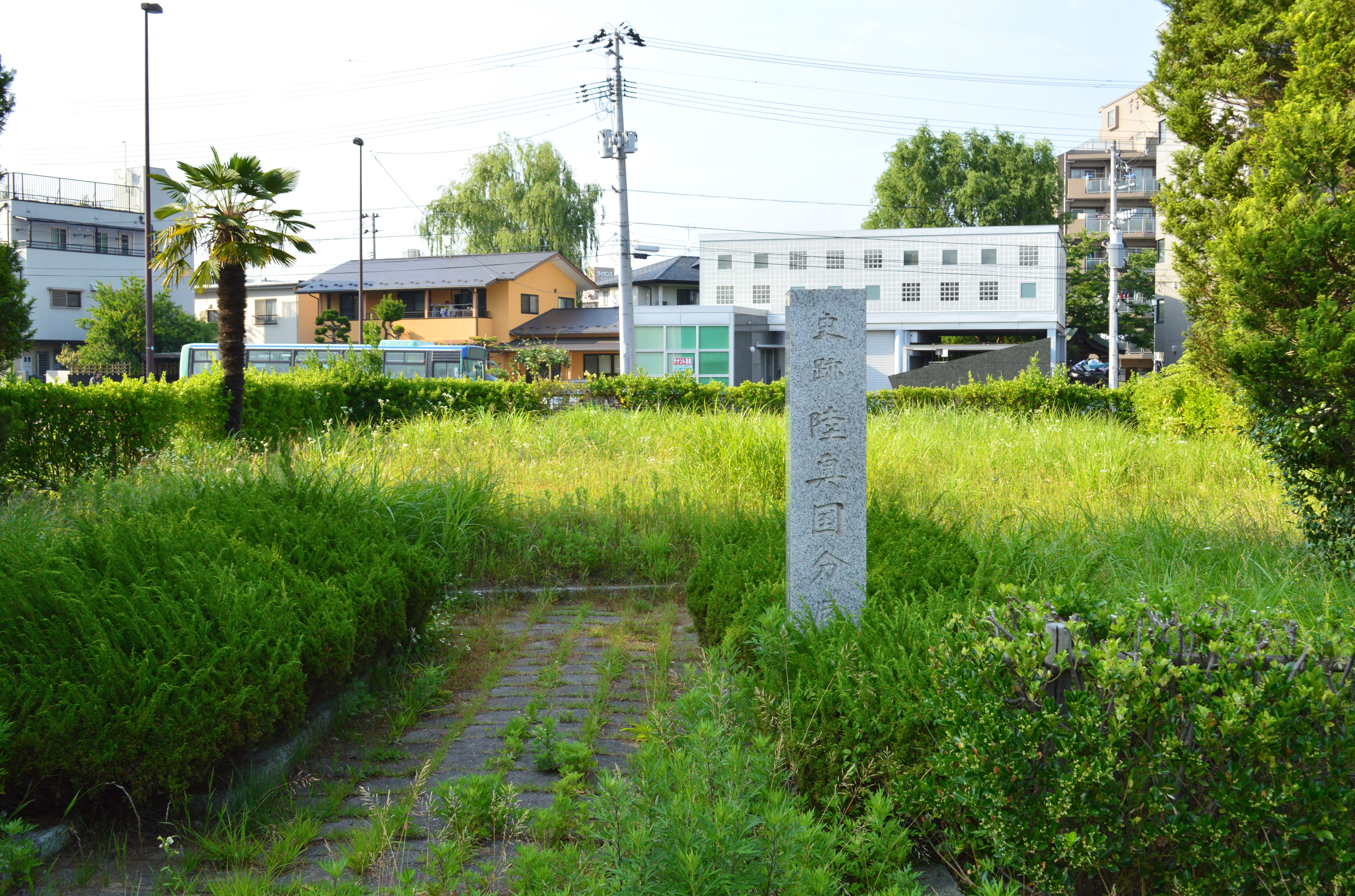
Site of the Mutsu Kokubun-niji Kondō

The rebuilt temple was not located on the same site as the original temple, whose location eventually became lost. However, an earthen mound in a nearby field had long been called the "Kannon-zuka". In 1948, it was determined that this was actually the remains of the ordination platform of the original temple. In an excavation survey in 1964, the foundation stones of a 9.8 by 8.53 meter Kondō were discovered, along with a large amount of Sue ware and Haji ware pottery and roof tiles. The style of these roof tiles was identical to that of the Mutsu Kokubun-ji, leading archaeologists to conclude that the temple had been built at the same time. In a subsequent survey, a large-scale stilt pillar was found on the north side of the site of Kondō, suggesting the possibility of a Pagoda.

The exact layout of the temple is unknown, but it appears to have measured 180 to 190 meters east-west width by 240 to 250 meters north-south, on a natural embankment at an altitude of about 11 meters formed by the Hirose River. A groove trace extending parallel to the west side of the estimated temple area has been found, indicating the possibility of a moat. The relics date from the late 8th century to the 10th century, and a large number of broken tiles and shards were found together in a midden, which may indicate that they were destroyed by an earthquake known to have occurred in 869 AD.

== See also ==
- Provincial temple
- List of Historic Sites of Japan (Miyagi)
