= Inaba Kokubun-ji =

Buddhist temple in Toyooka, Hyōgo, Japan

- 但馬国分寺
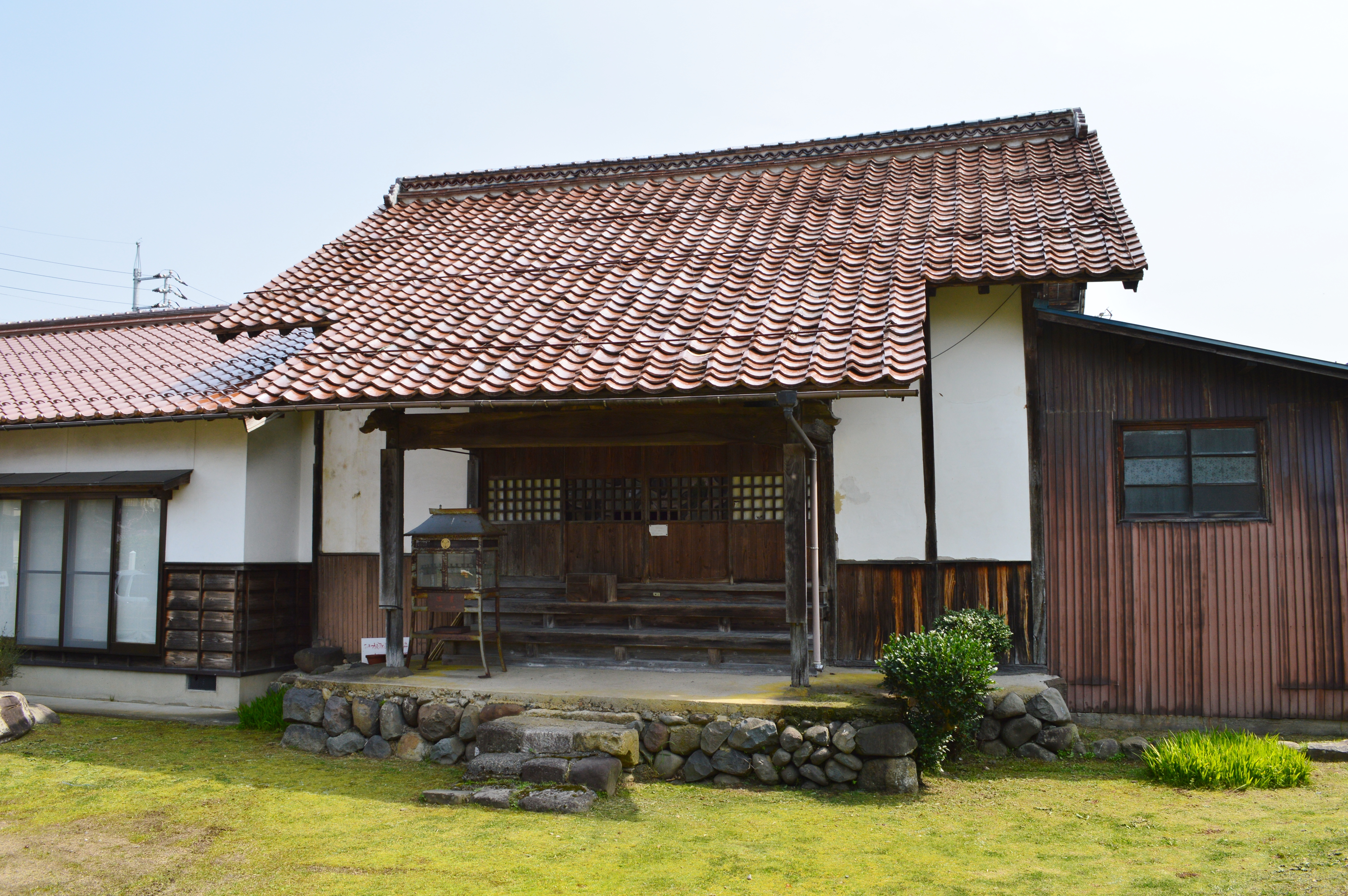
- Modern Inaba Kokubun-ji

- Location within Tottori Prefecture Location within Japan

Religion
- Affiliation: Buddhist
- Deity: Yakushi Nyōrai
- Rite: Ōbaku
- Status: functional

Location
- Location: Kokubunji, Kokufu-cho, Tottori-shi, Tottori
- Country: Japan
- Interactive map of Inaba Kokubun-ji
- Coordinates: 35°28′12.75″N 134°15′42.85″E

Architecture
- Founder: Emperor Shōmu
- Completed: c.741
- National Historic Site of Japan

The Inaba Kokubun-ji (因幡国分寺) is a Buddhist temple located in the Kokubunji, Kokufu-cho neighborhood of the city of Tottori, Tottori Prefecture, Japan. It belongs to the Ōbaku school of Japanese Zen, and its main image is a statue of Yakushi Nyorai. The temple is the modern successor of one of the provincial temples established by Emperor Shōmu during the Nara period (710–794) for the purpose of promoting Buddhism as the national religion of Japan and standardising control of imperial rule over the provinces.

== History ==
The Shoku Nihongi records that in 741, as the country recovered from a major smallpox epidemic, Emperor Shōmu ordered that a monastery and nunnery be established in every province, the kokubunji (国分寺).

The precise date of the construction of the Inaba Kokubun-ji has not been confirmed from archaeological materials or literature, however, it is believed to have been a number of years after Emperor Shōmu's proclamation of 741. The temple is mentioned in the Engishiki, compiled in 927, which states that the tax revenue assigned to its upkeep was 30,000 bundles of rice. Its subsequent history is unknown, and by the early Edo Period, had been reduced to a rustic chapel. It was rebuilt under the sponsorship of the Tottori Domain in the Enpō era (1673-1681), and was assigned revenues of 20,000 koku from the domain for its upkeep, but declined again after the Meiji restoration. Per archaeological excavations, the temple grounds were originally two chō square, or approximately 220 meters square, overlapping the current temple and surrounding Kokubunji neighborhood. The layout of the temple is uncertain.

In 1965, 17 foundation stones for a pagoda was found in a paddy field south of the current temple, and eight of these stones were subsequently relocated to the current temple grounds. These stones indicate that the pagoda was constructed on a base 8.1 meters on each side. The foundation stones are designated a Tangible Cultural Property by Tottori City. The site of the south gate of temple has been located about 90 meters to the south of the small Saoto shrine, but the site has been largely leveled. Artifacts found over the years include roof tiles, pottery shards, and fragments of wooden beams.

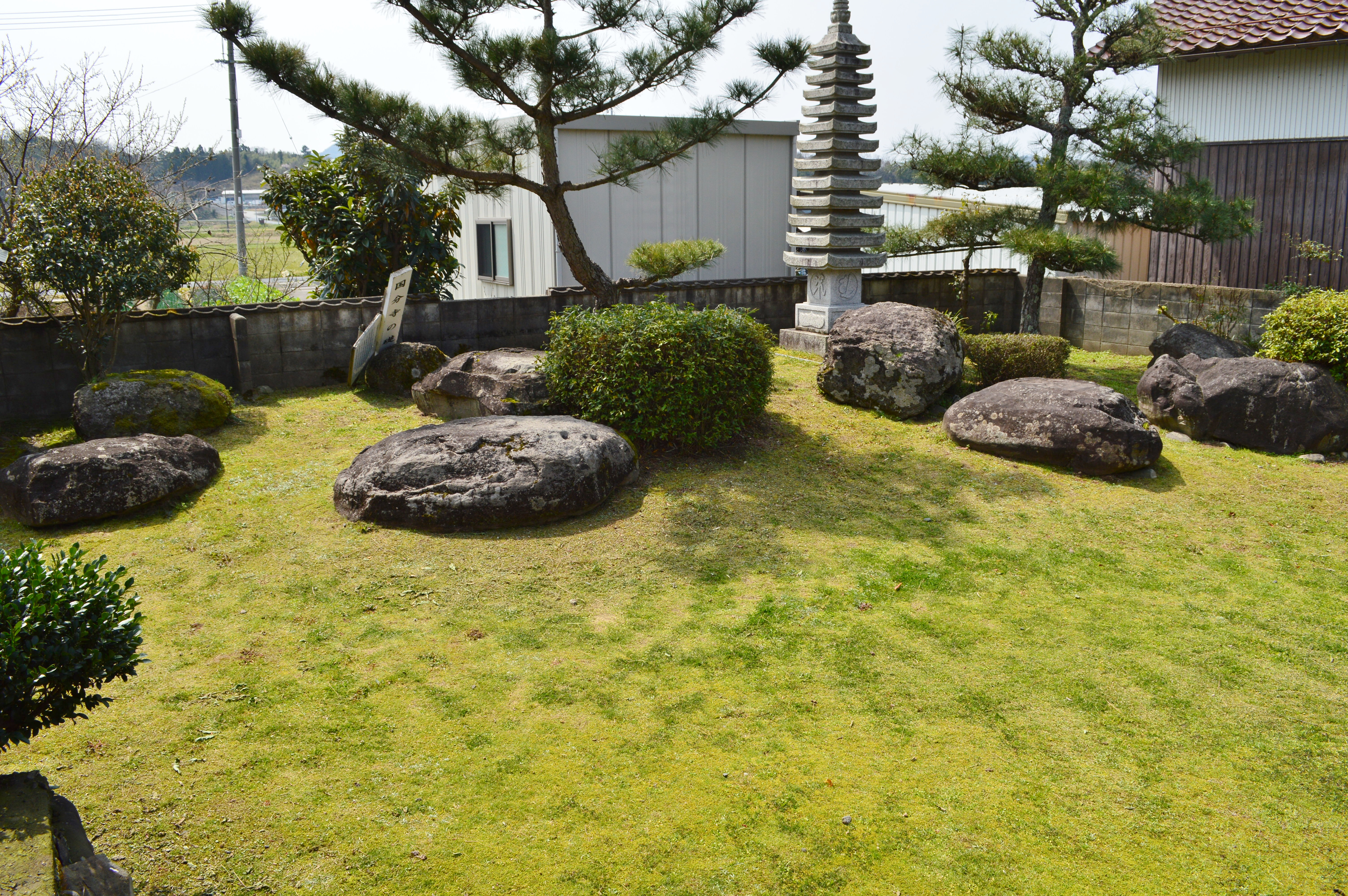
Foundation stones for pagoda

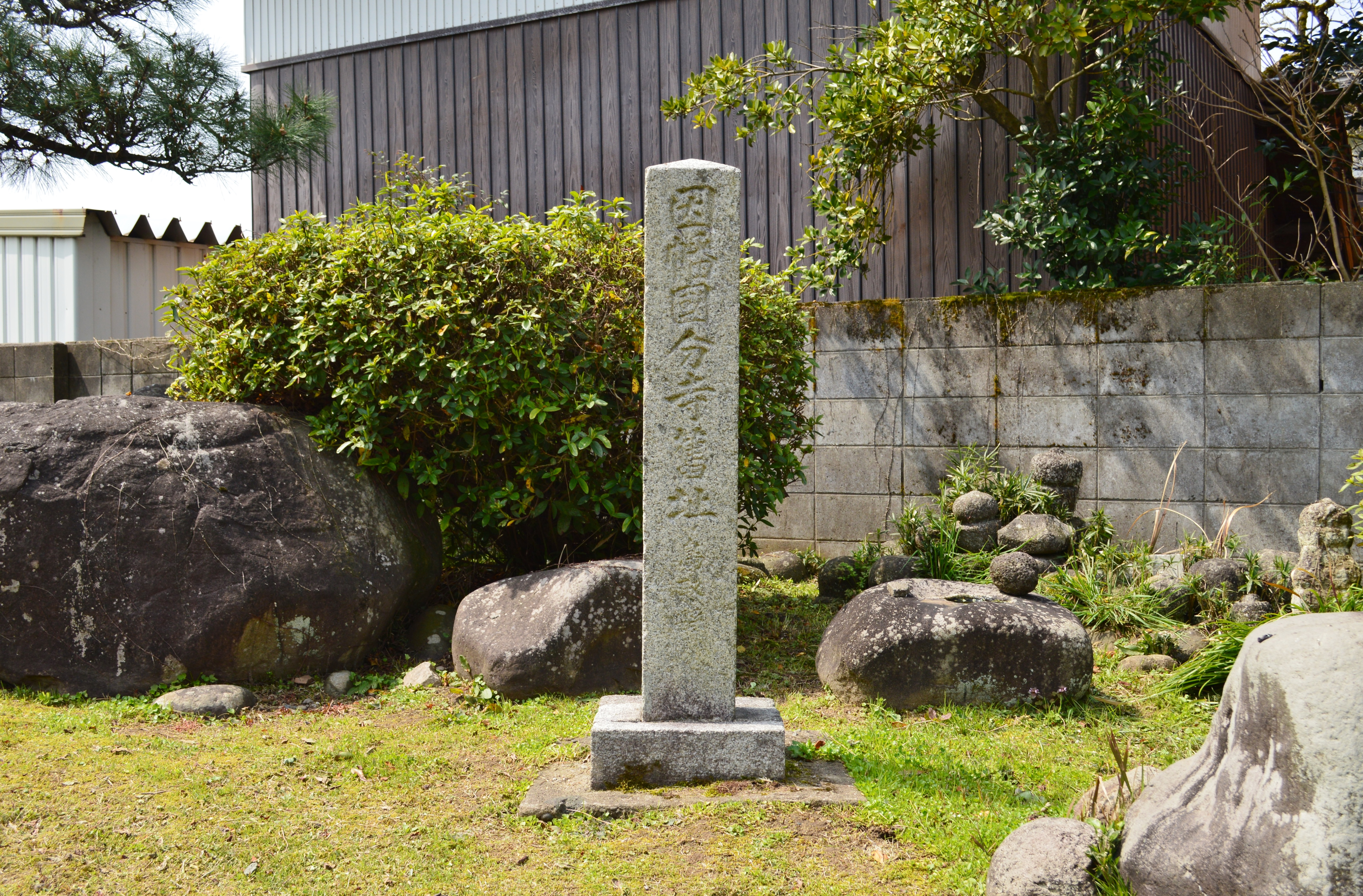
site of Inaba Kokubun-ji

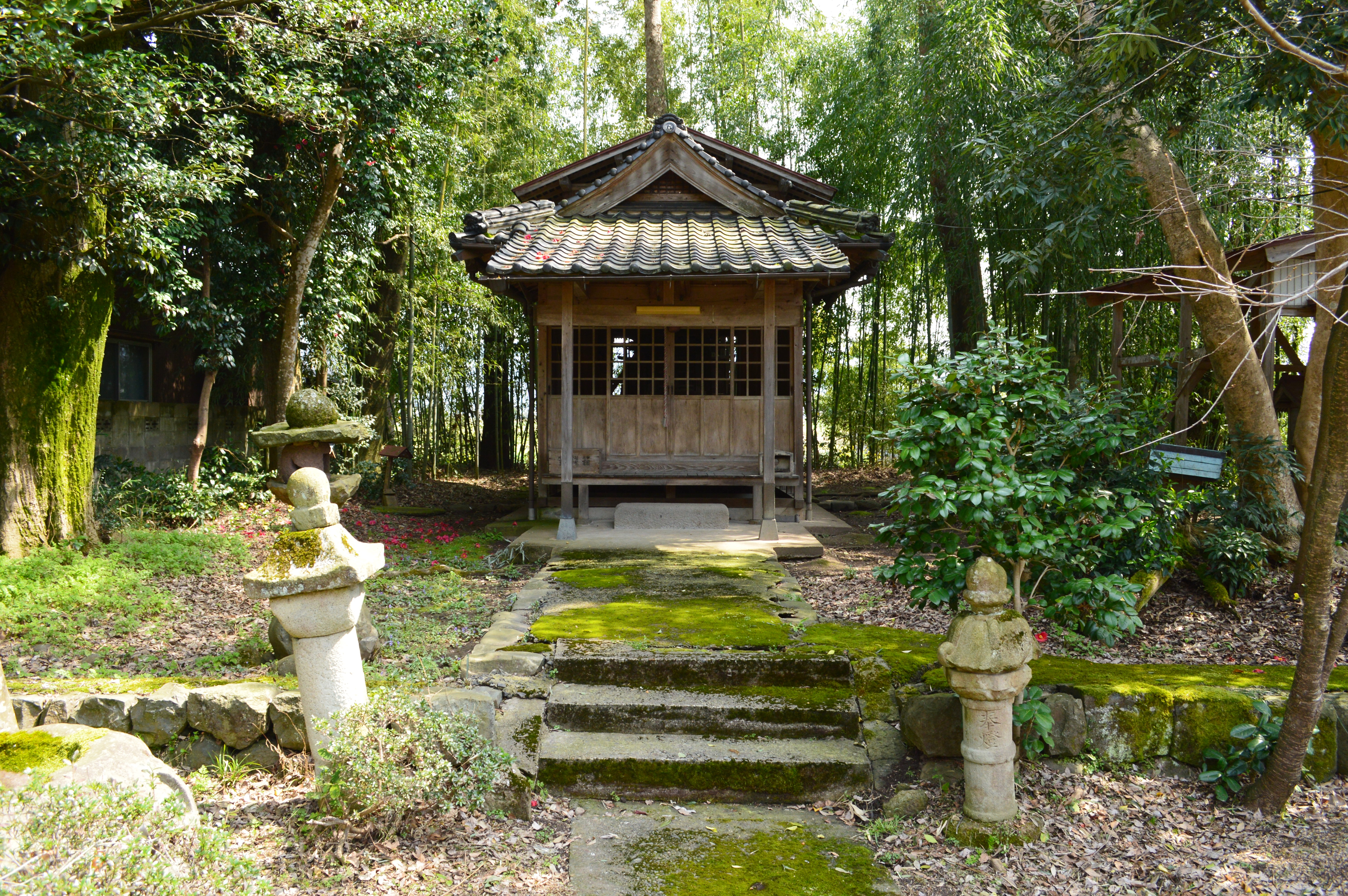
Saoto Jinja (site of South Gate and Kondo)

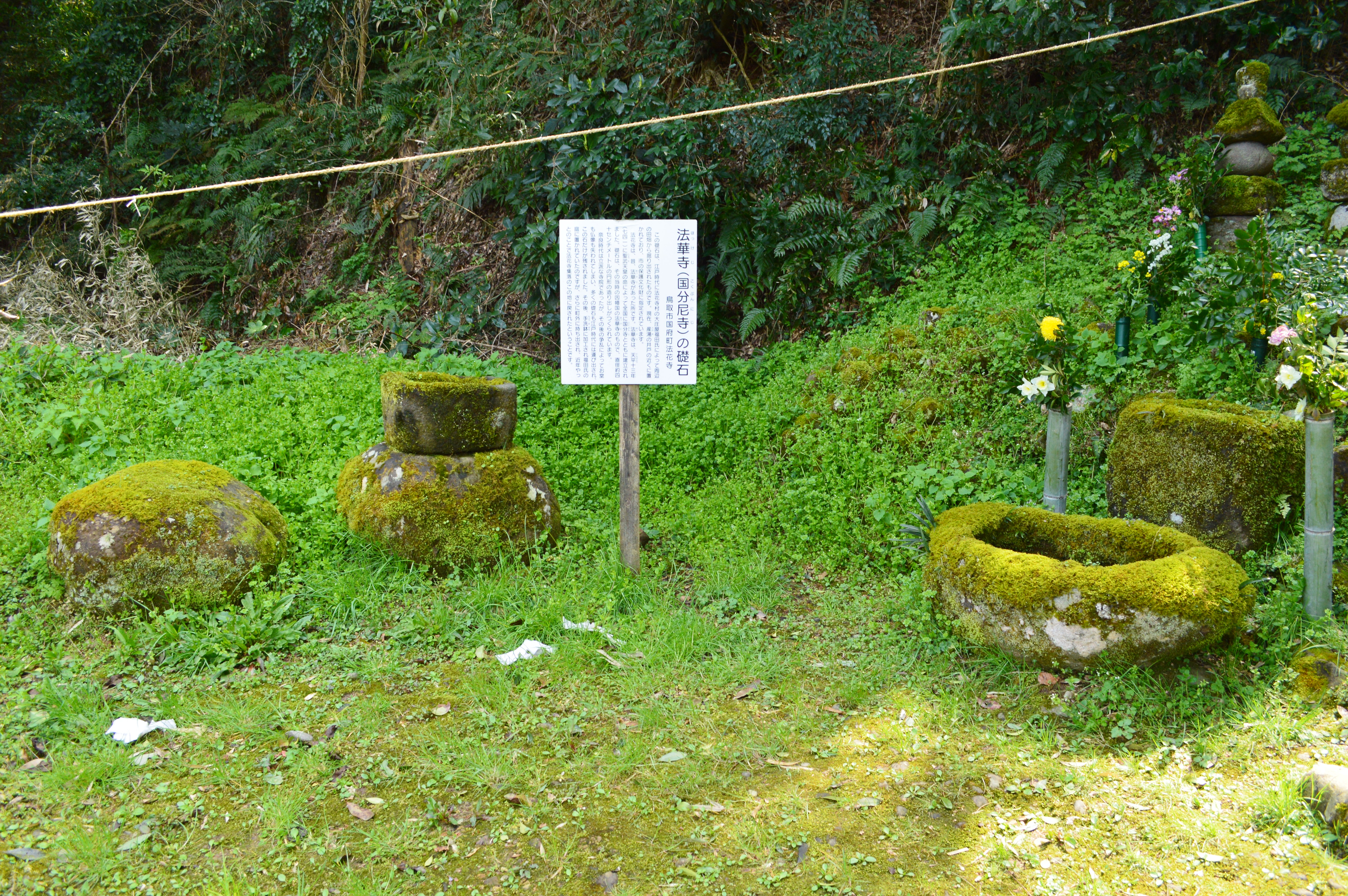
Foundation stones for Inaba Kokubun-niji

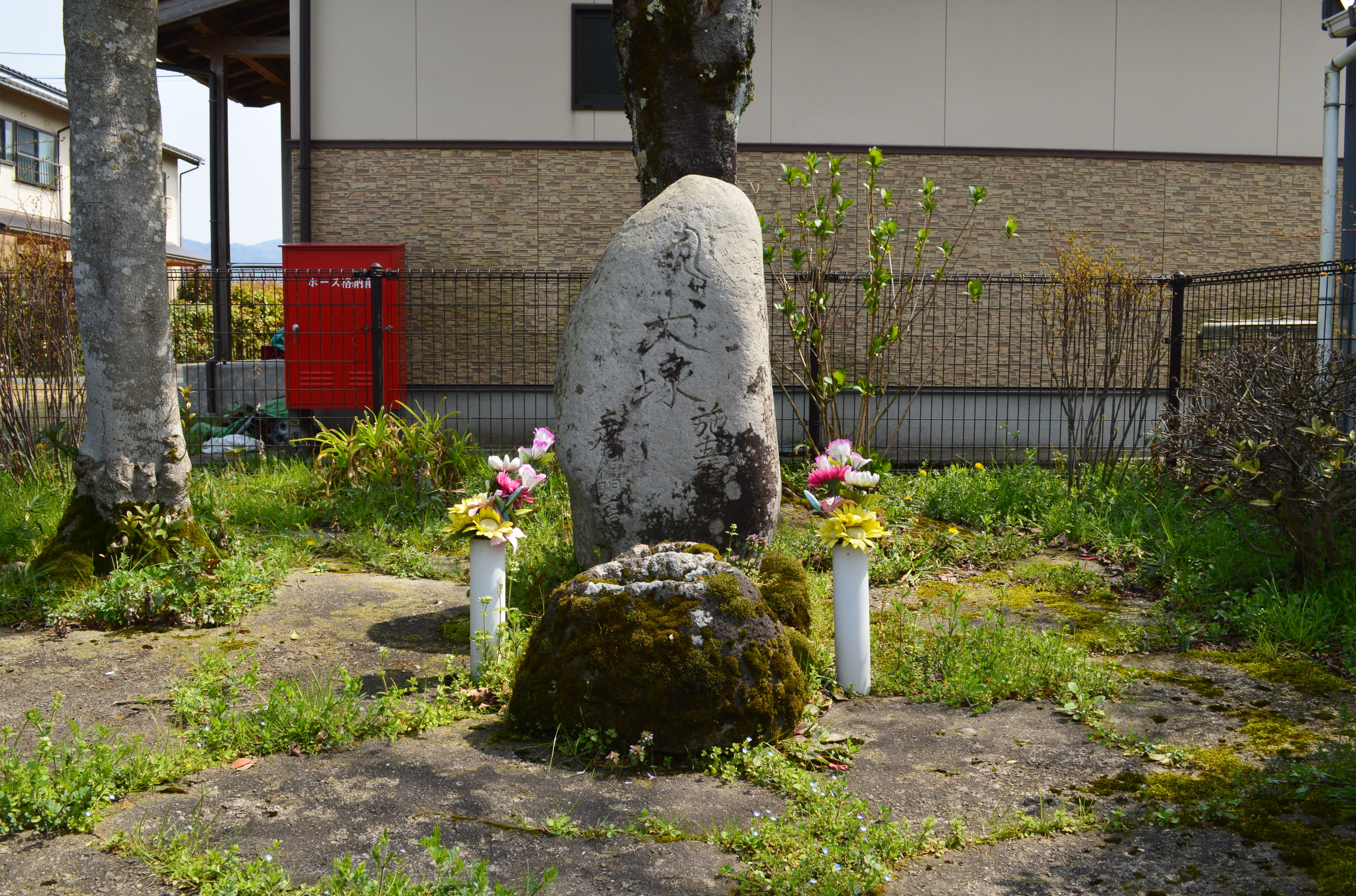
Inuzuka

The temple is located 2.3 kilometers northeast from Tsunoi Station on the JR West Inbi Line railway.

== Inaba Kokubun-niji ==
The location of the nunnery associated with the Inaba Kokubun-ji is unclear, but it is believed to have existed in the Hokkeji hamlet to the west of Inaba Kokubun-ji. Many of the foundation stones that remain near the Hokkeji hamlet are said to have been removed during the Edo period when Jonin-ji (in Gyotoku, Tottori city) was built, but one foundation stone that was excavated during the Edo period was made into a water basin and placed in a private garden, and was later removed outside the hamlet, but was returned to its current location in recent years. (It is now a Tangible Cultural Property designated by Tottori City). Excavations have been conducted in the rice fields around the Hokkeji hamlet, but no remains have been found to date.

In addition, there is a stone monument called "Inuzuka" between the Kokubunji and Hokkeji hamlets. This comes from a legend that a dog kept at Inaba Kokubun-ji Temple and Inaba Kokubun-niji died between the two temples. A monument was erected there during the Edo period, and it this is now designated as a Tottori city historic site.

== See also ==
- provincial temple
