= Kawachi Kokubun-ji =

- 薩摩国分寺 (Japanese)
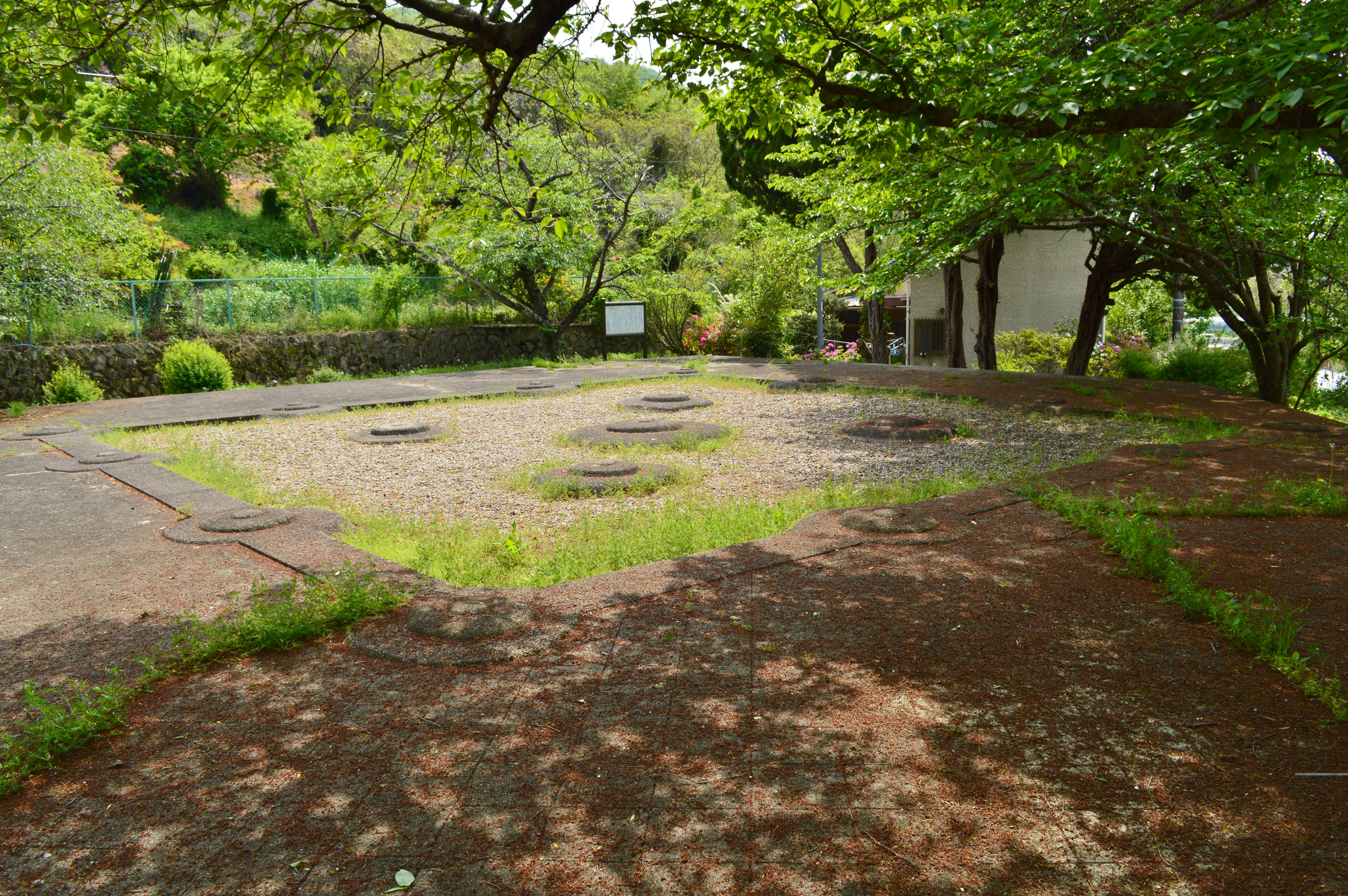
- Kawachi Kokubun-ji ruins

- Kawachi Kokubun-ji ruins Kawachi Kokubun-ji (Japan)
- Interactive map of Kawachi Kokubun-ji
- 34°34′1.50″N 135°39′27.37″E
- Type: temple ruins
- Periods: Nara - Kamakura period
- Location: Kashiwara, Osaka, Japan
- Region: Kansai region

History
- Built: 8th century AD

Site notes
- Public access: Yes (park)

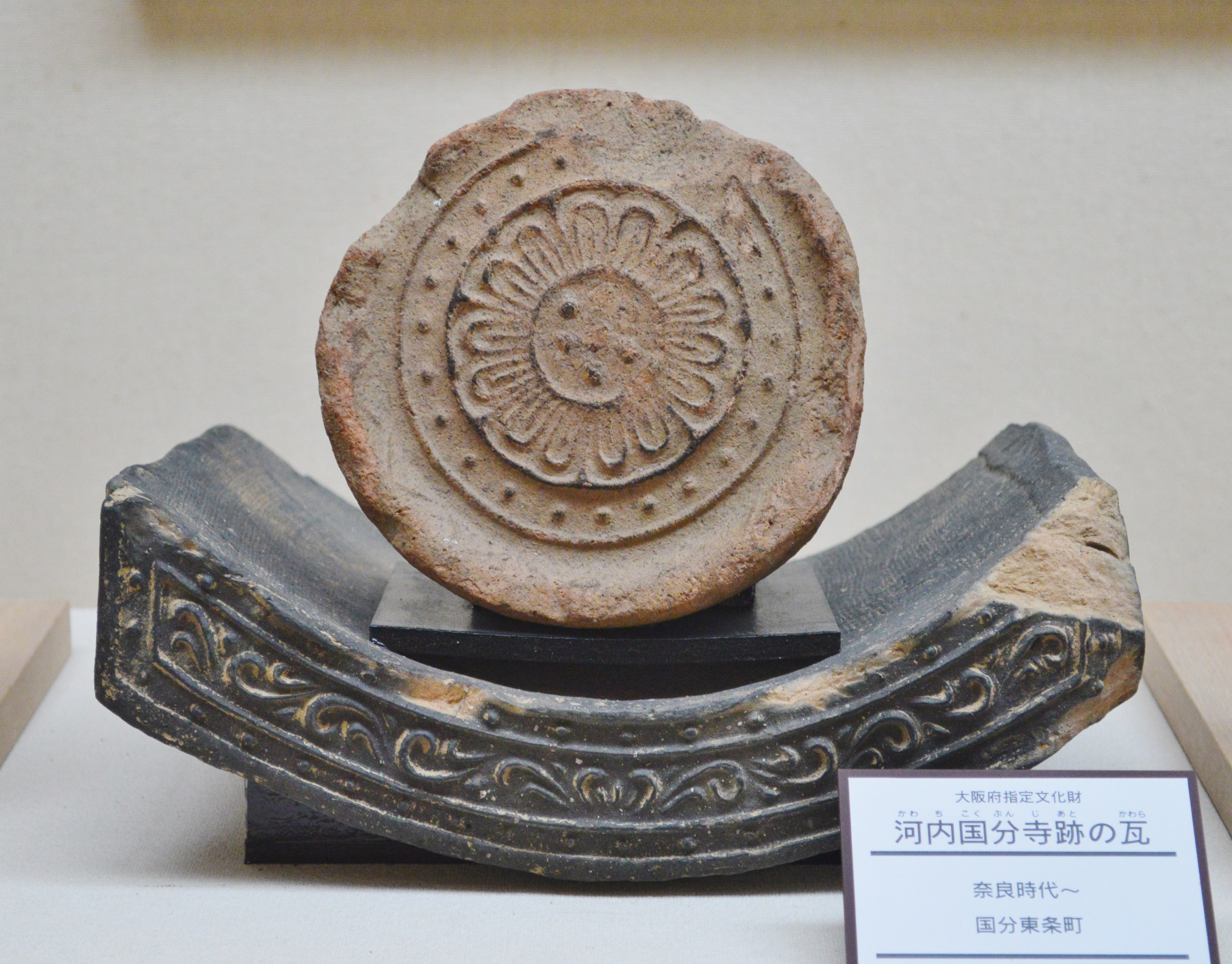
Roof tiles from Kawachi Kokubun-ji site

The Kawachi Kokubun-ji (河内国分寺) was a Buddhist temple in located in the Higanjō-chō neighborhood of the city of Kashiwara, Osaka Prefecture in the Kansai region of Japan. It was the provincial temple ("kokubunji") of former Kawachi Province. The temple no longer exists, and it ruins are preserved as park, but has not been designated as a National Historic Site. Excavated roof tiles from the site have been designated as a Tangible Cultural Property by Osaka Prefecture.

== Overview ==
The Shoku Nihongi records that in 741 AD, as the country recovered from a major smallpox epidemic, Emperor Shōmu ordered that a monastery and nunnery be established in every province, the kokubunji (国分寺). These temples were built to a semi-standardized template, and served both to spread Buddhist orthodoxy to the provinces, and to emphasize the power of the Nara period centralized government under the Ritsuryō system.

The Kawachi Kokubun-ji is located on the left bank of the Yamato River in eastern Osaka Prefecture, on a plateau extending north from the Myojin Mountains on the border between Osaka Prefecture and Nara Prefecture. The remains of the Kokubun-niji nunnery are estimated to be located 900 meters west (no remains confirmed), and the estimated site of Kawachi Kokufu (in Fujiidera) is located about four kilometers northwest. Archaeological excavations have been conducted on the temple grounds since 1934, and the foundation stones of the Main Hall and Pagoda have been discovered, but the details of the temple layout is still unclear. Because the temple was located on a steep slope, the flat surface that is the estimated temple grounds is narrow, making it a unique example compared to other Kokubunji temples that have large temple grounds. The remains of the pagoda are currently open to the public as a historical park.

Excavations indicate that the temple was built in the mid-8th century; however, the existence of a predecessor temple and earlier remains have also been confirmed. In particular, the appearance of the excavated roof tiles is similar to that of the presumed Takeharaitonomiya palace site on the opposite bank of the Yamato River, where Emperor Shōmu had his palace. Details of the temple history are sporadic and uncertain. It appears in the Engishiki records of 927, which stipulate that it had revenues of 10,000 bundles of rice for its upkeep, and records of its landholdings in Izumi Province in 1109 and in 1207 exist. The temple then disappears from the historical record and by the Edo period its location was unknown. A successor temple, the current Kawachi Kokubun-ji, was built in the Edo period, 1.1 km northeast of the Kawachi Kokubun-ji ruins.

The pagoda base is made of cut tuff stones, measuring approximately 19 meters on a side and 1.54 meters high. There are six steps on each side. The top of the base is made of square tuff laid in a diagonal lattice pattern. Six cornerstones (including the central stone) remain, and the building on the base is estimated to be 10.36 meters square, making it a large structure. It is thought that a seven-story pagoda was constructed on this base.

== See also ==
- Provincial temple
