= Iga Kokubun-ji =

Buddhist temple in Iga, Japan

- 伊賀国分寺 (Japanese)
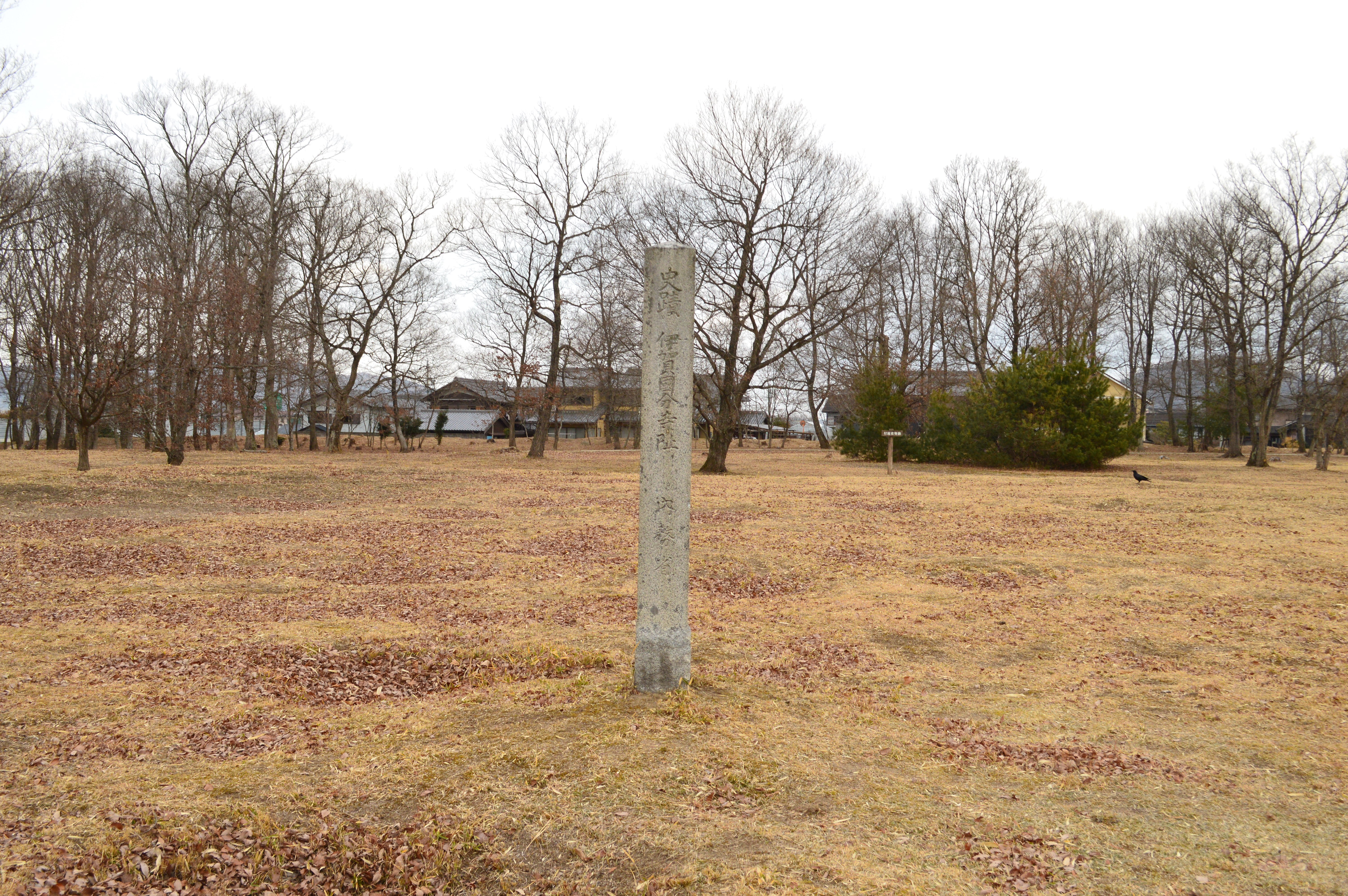
- Iga Kokubun-ji ruins

- Iga Kokubun-ji ruins Iga Kokubun-ji (Japan)
- Interactive map of Iga Kokubun-ji
- 34°45′30″N 136°09′14″E
- Type: temple ruins
- Periods: Nara - Kamakura period
- Location: Iga, Mie, Japan
- Region: Kansai region

History
- Built: c.8th century AD

Site notes
- Public access: Yes (no public facilities)

The Iga Kokubun-ji (伊賀国分寺) was a Buddhist temple located in the Saimyōji neighborhood of the city of Iga, Mie Prefecture, in the Kansai region of Japan. It was the provincial temple ("kokubunji") of former Iga Province. Its location is now an archaeological site, which has been preserved as a National Historic Site since 1923.

== Overview ==
The Shoku Nihongi records that in 741, as the country recovered from a major smallpox epidemic, Emperor Shōmu ordered that a monastery and nunnery be established in every province, the kokubunji (国分寺). These temples were built to a semi-standardized template, and served both to spread Buddhist orthodoxy to the provinces, and to emphasize the power of the Nara period centralized government under the Ritsuryō system.

The site of the Iga Kokubun-ji is on a plateau with an elevation of 170 meters, southeast of the modern city center of Iga. About 200 meters to the east of this site is the trace of another Buddhist temple, the Chōrakuzan temple ruins, which is believed to have originally been the Iga Kokubun-niji, the provincial nunnery associated with the Iga Kokubun-ji.

The original design of the temple was a walled square area, 220 meters east-to-west by 240 meters north-to-south, containing a Middle Gate, Kondō, and Lecture Hall, were arranged in a straight line from south to north, with a cloister connecting the Middle Gate to the sides of the Kondō. Many of the foundation stones were robbed during the construction of Iga Ueno Castle, but from traces which remain, the Kondō and Lecture Hall appear to have been 5 x 7 bay buildings. The foundations of the Pagoda have been found outside the cloister, to the east, and the platform for the Kyōzō and Kuri behind the Lecture Hall. However, the South Gate remains to be discovered. The alignment of the main axis of the buildings in compound, as well as contemporary structures in the vicinity, is offset by 4 degrees and 30 minutes from north, for unknown reasons.

Details of the temple's foundation are unknown. The temple is named in the Engishiki records in an entry dated 927 AD, and sporadically in other documents in the Heian period into the early Kamakura period, but it disappears from the historical record before the end of the start of the Muromachi period. Archaeological excavations also support this, as roof tiles and pottery shards from the Heian and Kamakura periods have been found, but nothing later, although no comprehensive full-scale excavation has been conducted. By the Muromachi period, even the actual site of the temple had been lost and the ruins in this area were referred to as the "Chōja Mansion". By the Meiji period, these ruins were officially designated as the "Mita temple ruins" after the local neighborhood and several other temples in various locations in the Iga area claimed to be the successor of the ancient Iga Kokubun-ji, including the temples of Rakuon-ji and Hokke-ji. The present site was only recognized as the true location of the Iga Kokubun-ji in the 1910s, when the earthworks and foundations of some of its structures were discovered. It was designated a National Historic Site in 1923; however, this designation was abolished in September 1944 to permit the construction on an airfield by the Imperial Japanese Navy. The ruins were severely damaged by the construction of semi-underground hangars and bunkers. The National Historic Site designation was restored in 1948, and the area under protection extended in 1961.

The site is approximately 22 kilometers east of Kayamachi Station on the Iga Railway Iga Line.

== Gallery ==
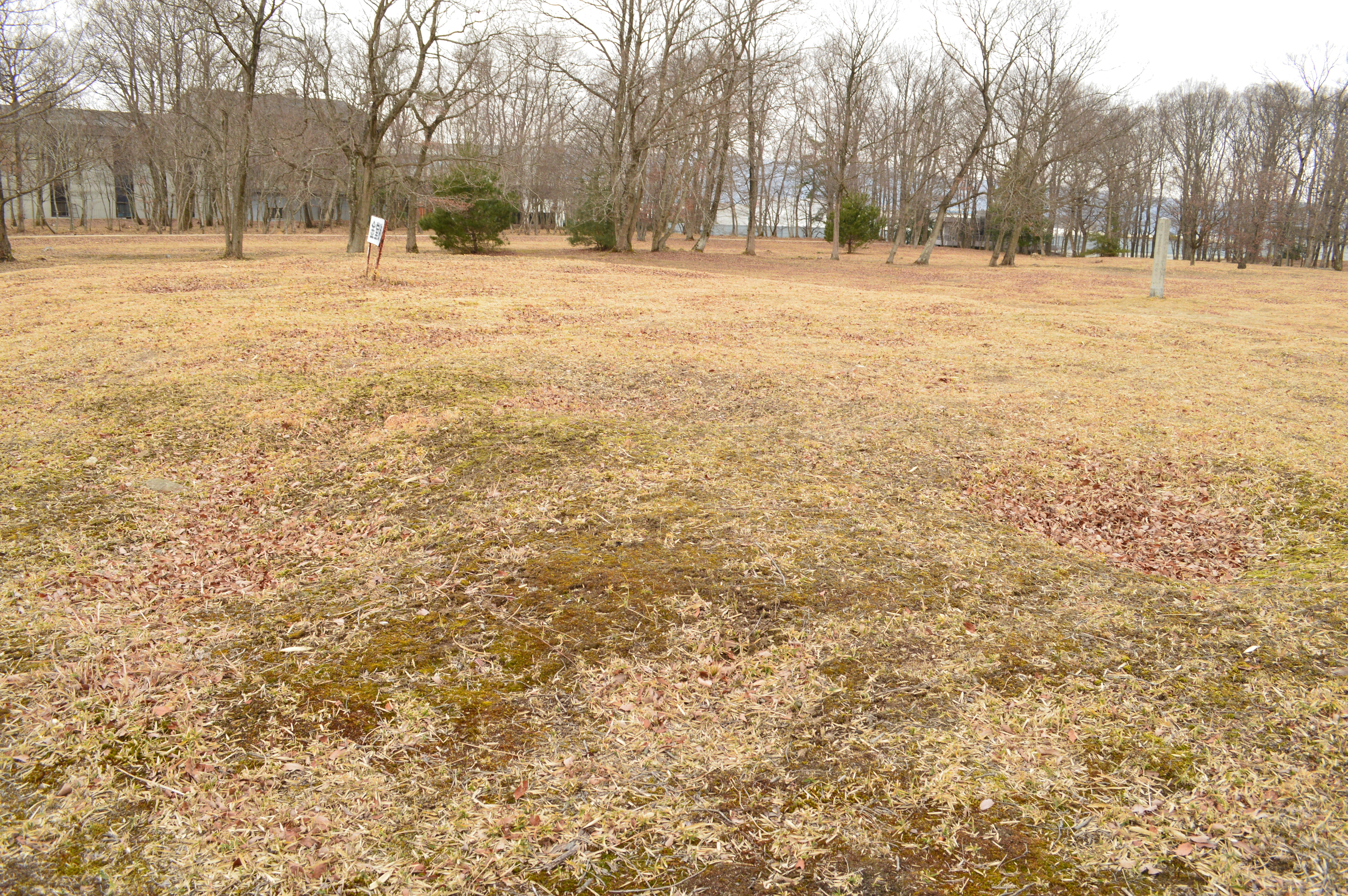
Kondō ruins

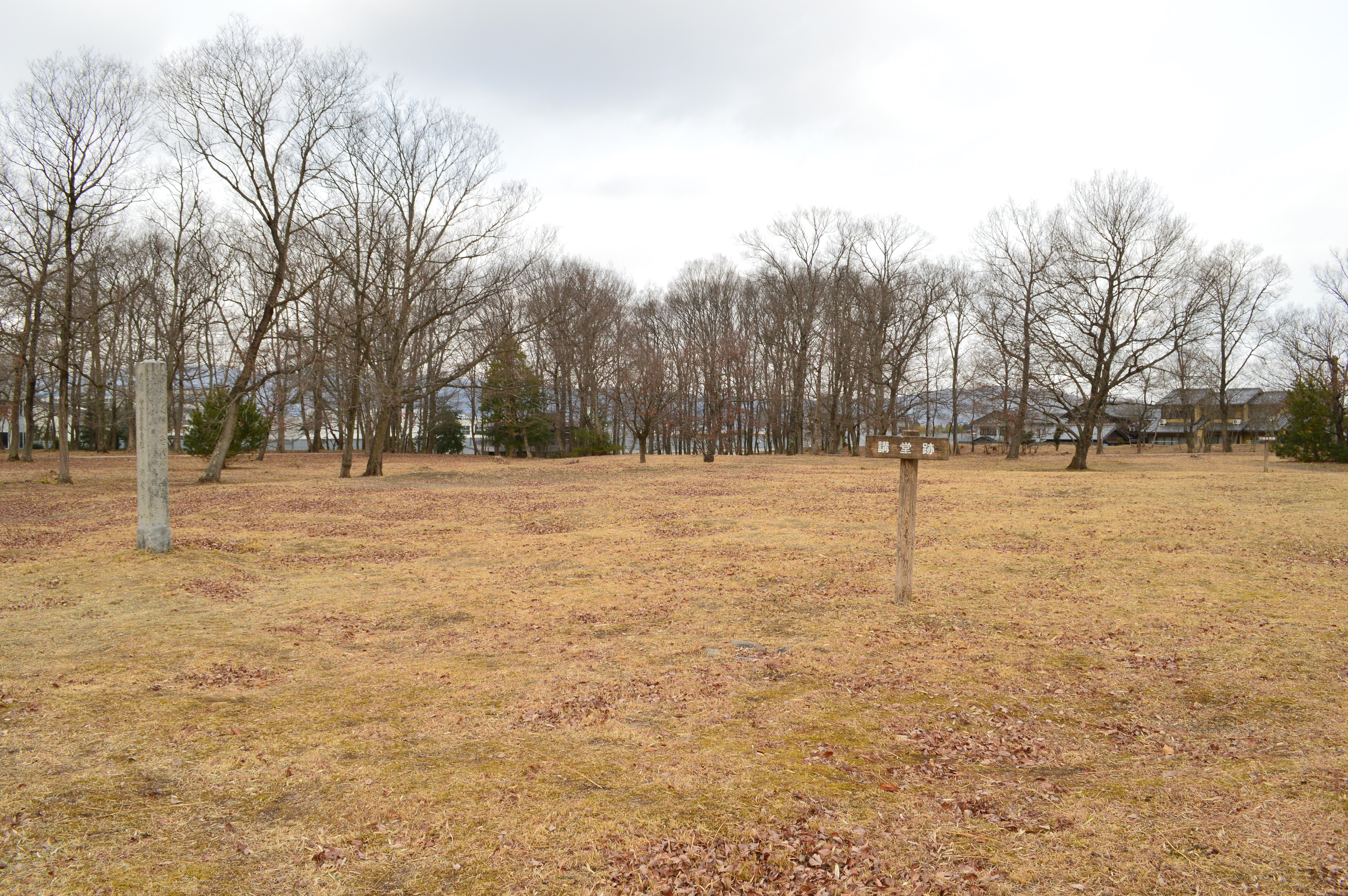
Lecture Hall ruins

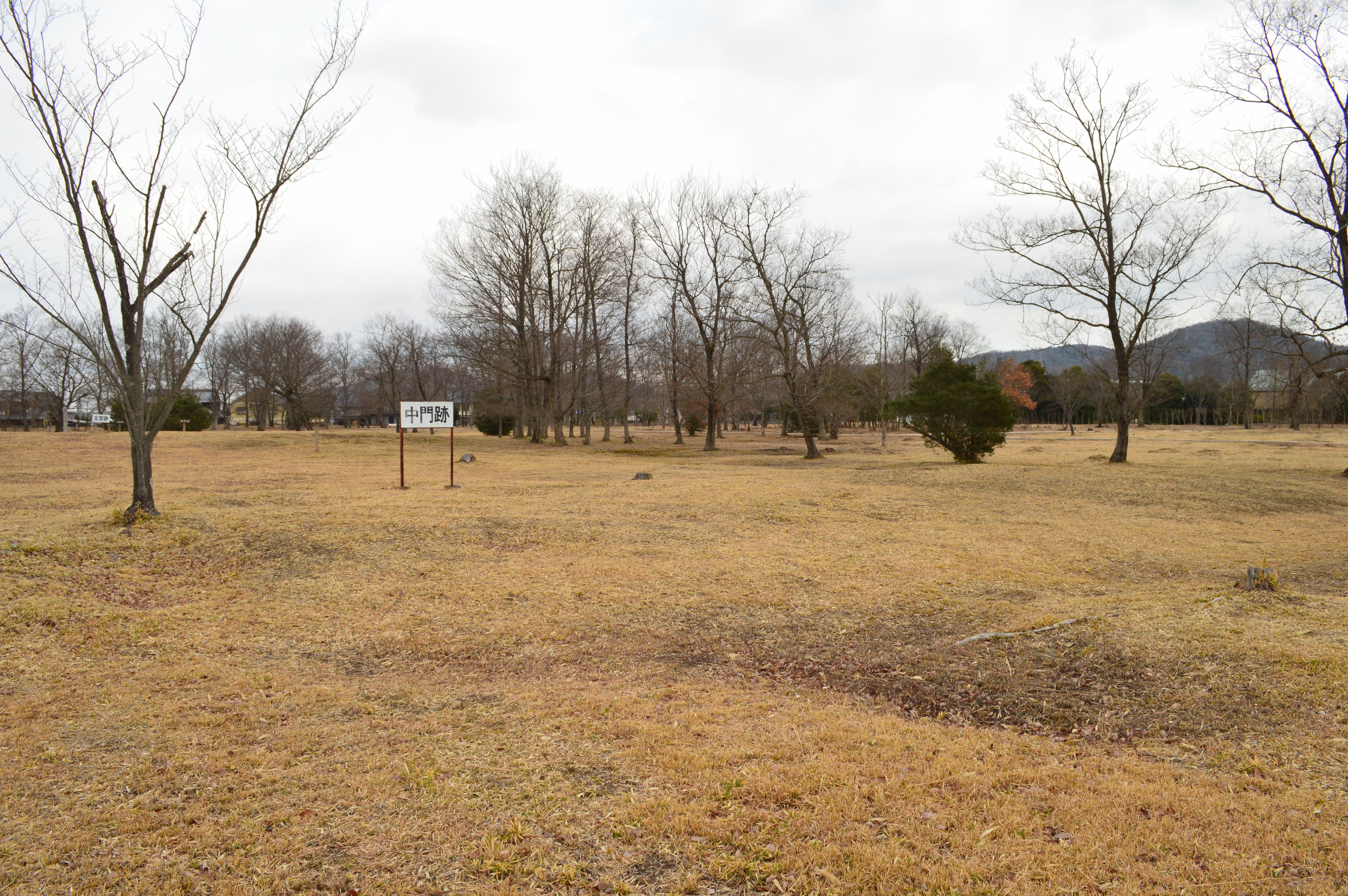
Middle Gate ruins

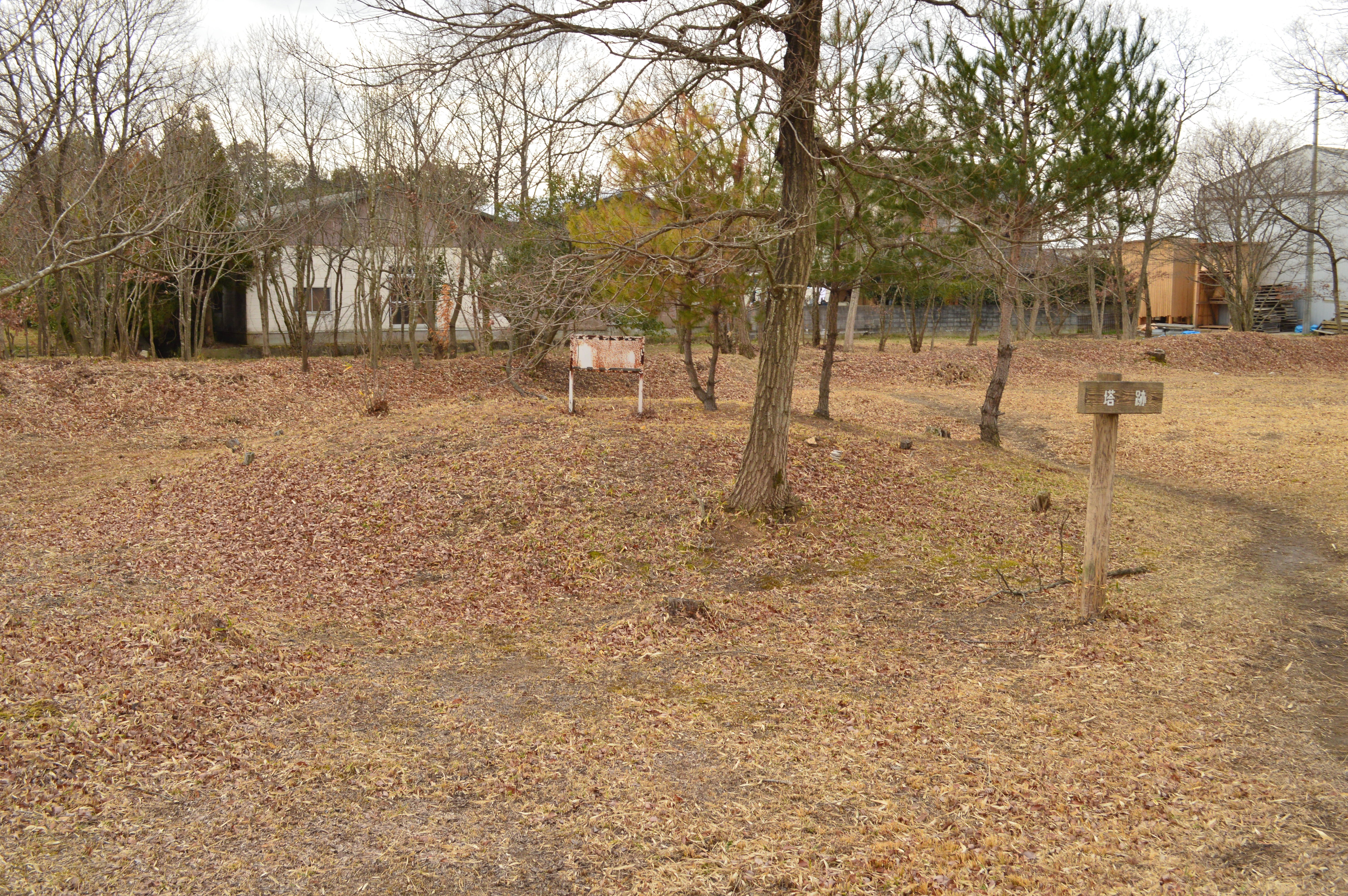
Pagoda ruins

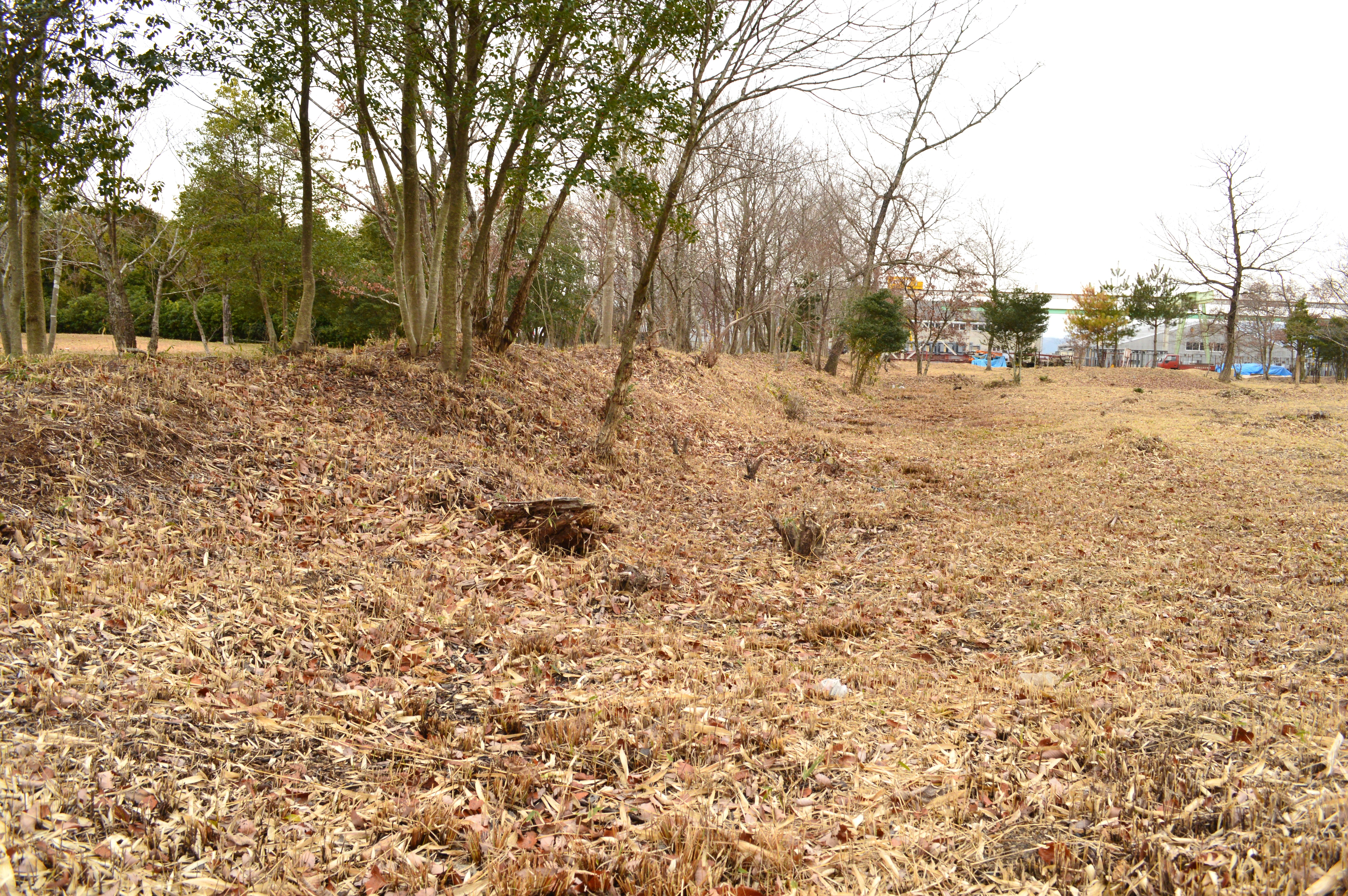
Rampart ruins

== Chōrakuzan temple ruins ==
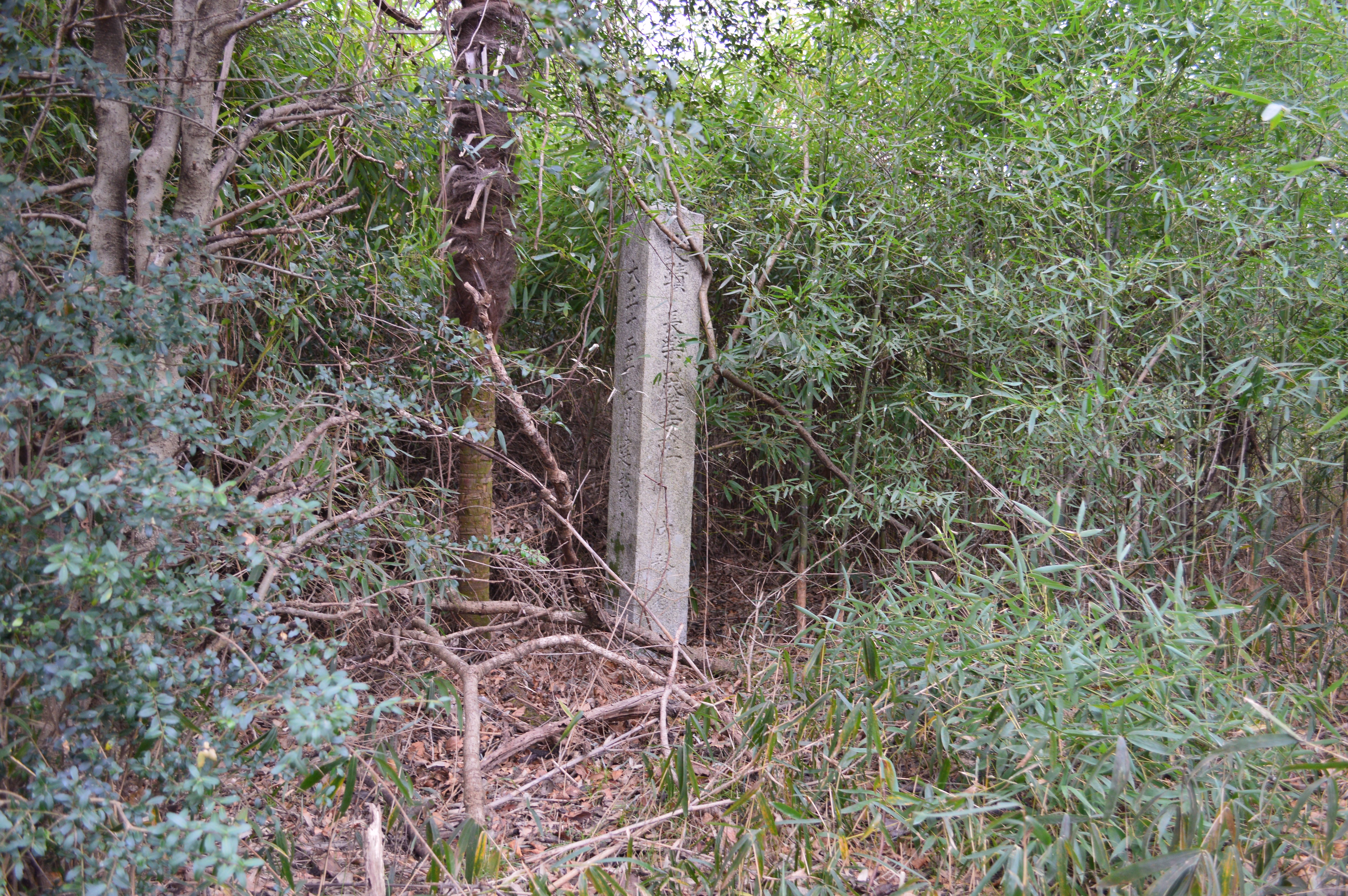
Chōraku-ji temple ruins

Located 200 meters to the east of the site of the Iga Kokubun-ji is another temple ruin which has been dated to the same period. As the actual name of the temple was unknown, it was designated Chōrakuzan temple ruins (長楽山廃寺, Chōrakuzan haiji) after the name of a hill behind the site. Based on its location and the remnants of the earthen bases for a Kondō and Lecture Hall, it is mostly likely the ruins of the provincial nunnery, or Iga Kokubun-niji, which was built at the same time has the Iga Kokubun-ji. However, unlike the Iga Kokubun-ji, this temple was aligned 11 degrees east of north. None of the foundation stones remain, and their locations have been determined only by examining the soil where the stones once stood. It is estimated that the Kondō was a 4 x 7 bay hall. No remnants of the gates or pagoda have been found. As with the ruins of Iga Kokubun-ji, the temple appears to have been surrounded by a square earthwork enclosure, but in this case, at least on the west and south sides, there was a double rampart.

This site has also been designated as a National Historic Site.

== See also ==
- Provincial temple
- List of Historic Sites of Japan (Mie)
