= Tōtōmi Kokubun-ji =

Buddhist temple

- 遠江国分寺 (Japanese)
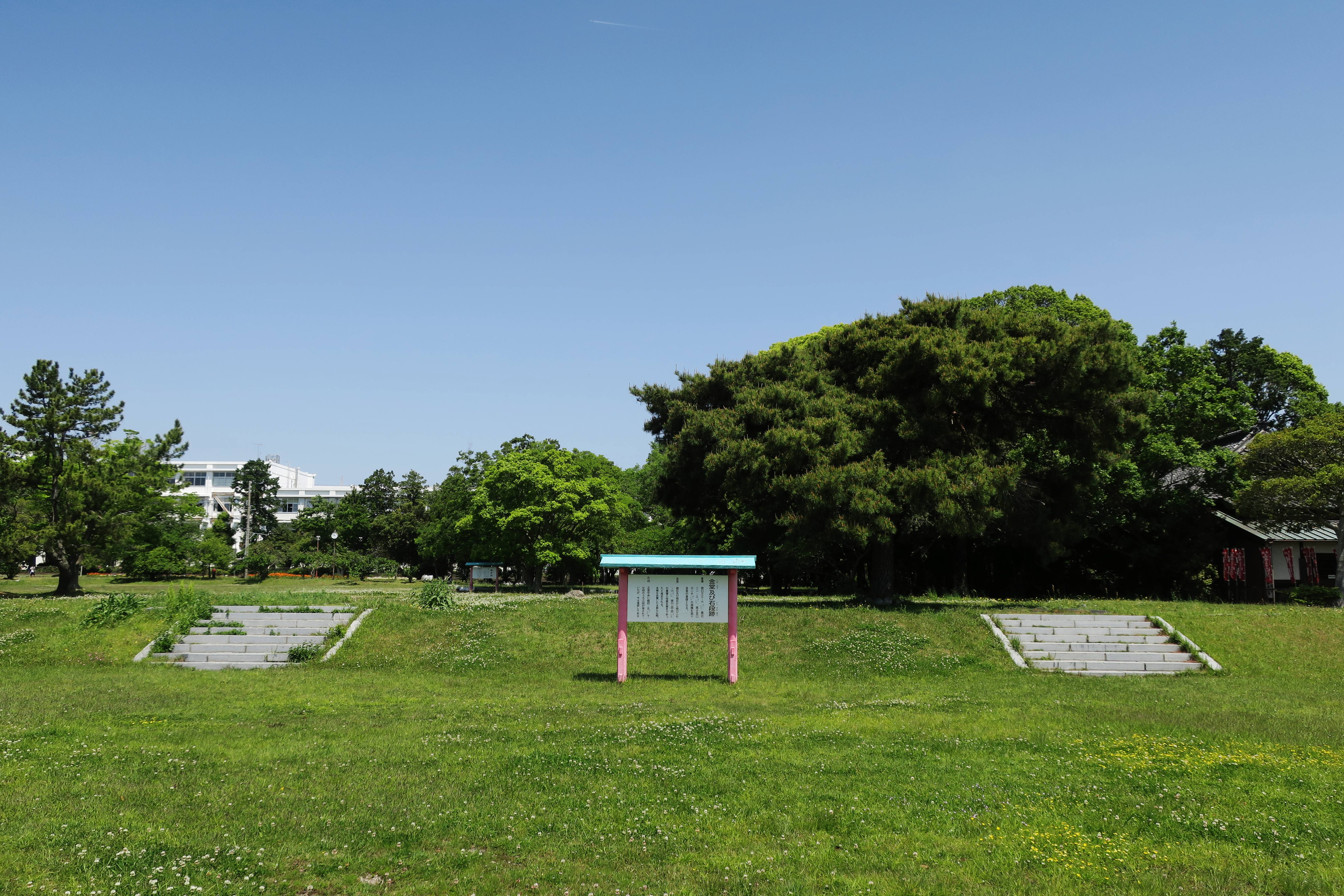
- The ruins of the main hall (Kondō) of Tōtōmi Kokubunji Temple

- Tōtōmi Kokubun-ji ruins Tōtōmi Kokubun-ji (Japan)
- Interactive map of Tōtōmi Kokubun-ji
- 34°43′10″N 137°51′05″E
- Type: temple ruins
- Periods: Nara - Kamakura period
- Location: Iwata, Shizuoka, Japan
- Region: Tōkai region

History
- Built: c.8th century AD

Site notes
- Public access: Yes (no public facilities)

The Tōtōmi Kokubun-ji (遠江国分寺) was a Buddhist temple located in the Mitsuke neighborhood of what is now the city of Iwata, Shizuoka, Japan. It was one of the provincial temples established by Emperor Shōmu during the Nara period (710 – 794) for the purpose of promoting Buddhism as the national religion of Japan and standardising control of the imperial rule over the provinces. The original temple no longer exists, but the temple grounds are an archaeological site which was designated as a Special National Historic Site in 1962. The area under protection was expanded in 2012.

== History ==
The Shoku Nihongi records that in 741 AD, as the country recovered from a major smallpox epidemic, Emperor Shōmu ordered that a monastery and nunnery be established in every province, the kokubunji (国分寺).

The Tōtōmi Kokubun-ji site is approximately 1.3 kilometers north from Iwata Station on the Tōkaidō Main Line railway. The nearby area has many ancient ruins, including the site of the provincial capital for Tōtōmi Province. The ruins of the Kokubun-niji provincial nunnery associated with the provincial temple are located a short distance to the north.

Initial archaeological excavations were conducted from 1951 through 1954, uncovering the foundations of the Kondō, Kōdō (Lecture Hall), Pagoda, middle gate, southern gate, and a double set of cloisters and enclosing walls, along with many pottery shards, roof tiles and nails from the Nara period. This was the first major excavation of a kokubun-ji ruin in Japan. The site measured 180 meters long from east-to-west and about 253 meters north-to-south. The layout of the buildings was in accordance with the standardized "Shichidō garan" formation, similar to Tōdai-ji in Nara, the template upon which the kokubunji temples were based. The roof tiles used for the temple were baked in a kiln that was located in nearby Kakegawa. The Kondō was a seven by four bay hall with dimensions of 27.6 by 15.6 meters. The foundations for the pagoda were extraordinarily large, measuring 16 meters on each side. From these dimensions, it can be calculated that the pagoda had a probable height of 68 meters, and was a seven-story structure. The temple area was surrounded by an earthen enclosure, traces of which remain on the west side.

The exact date of the temple's foundation is unknown, and it disappears from historical records after a fire in 819 AD. However, the temple is believed to have existed until at least the latter half of the 10th century to the 11th century. An image of Yakushi Nyōrai, which was worshipped by local villagers in a small chapel on the site until the end of the Edo period is believed to be a survivor of the original temple, and is now housed in a small Shingon temple located nearby. The site is now a public historical park with reconstructions of some of the gates and walls of the temple complex.

== Gallery ==
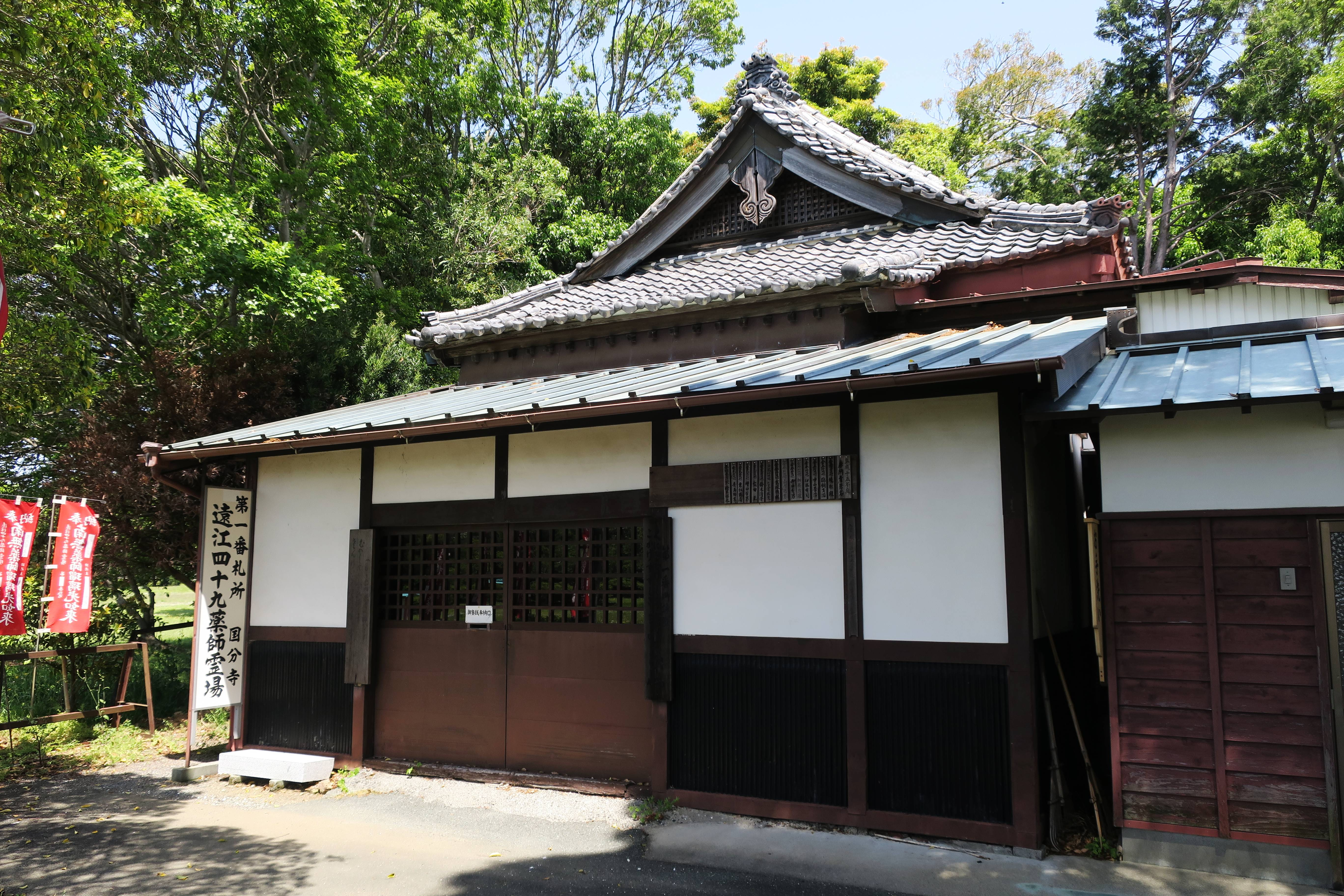
present-day Yakushi-dō

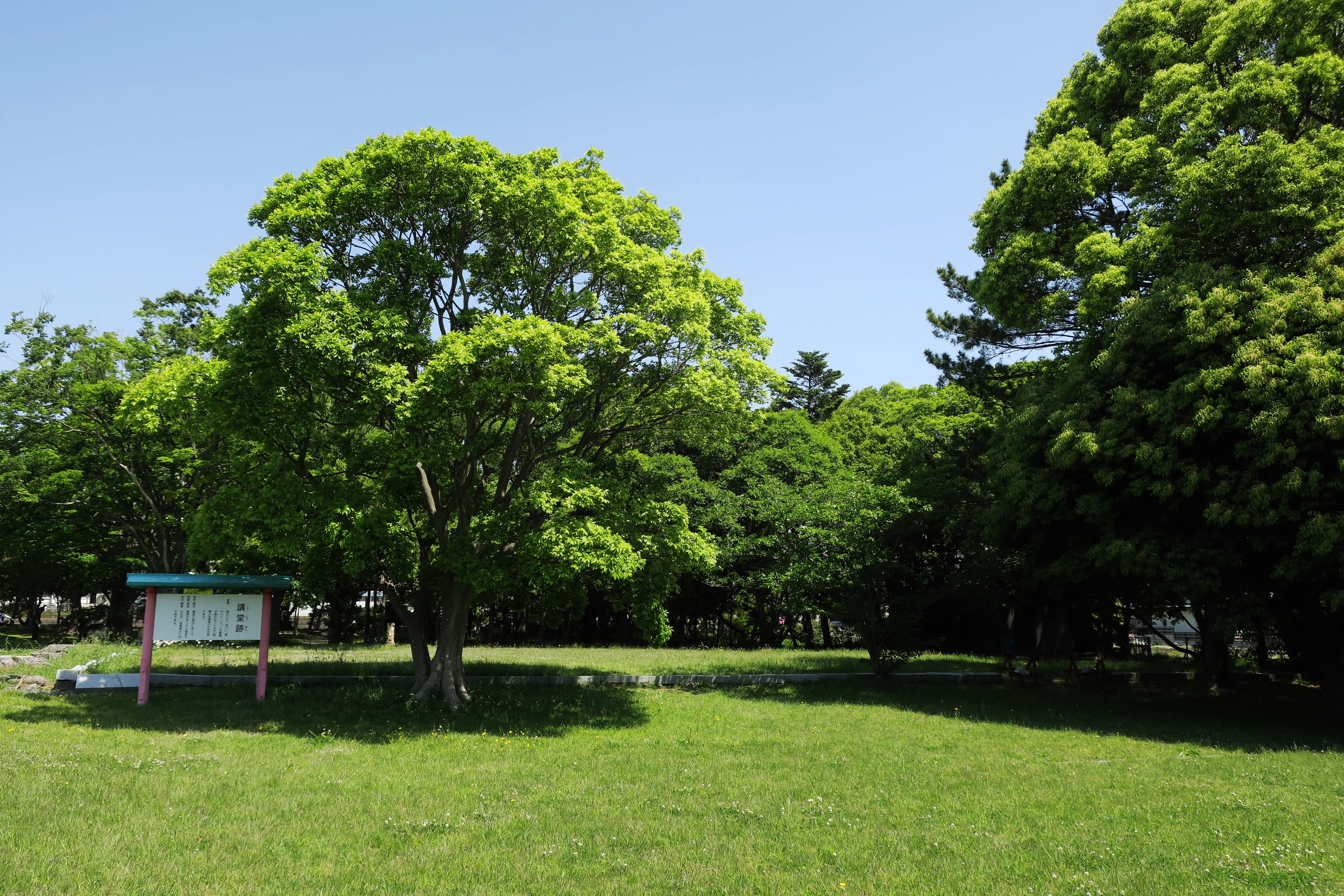
Site of the Kōdō

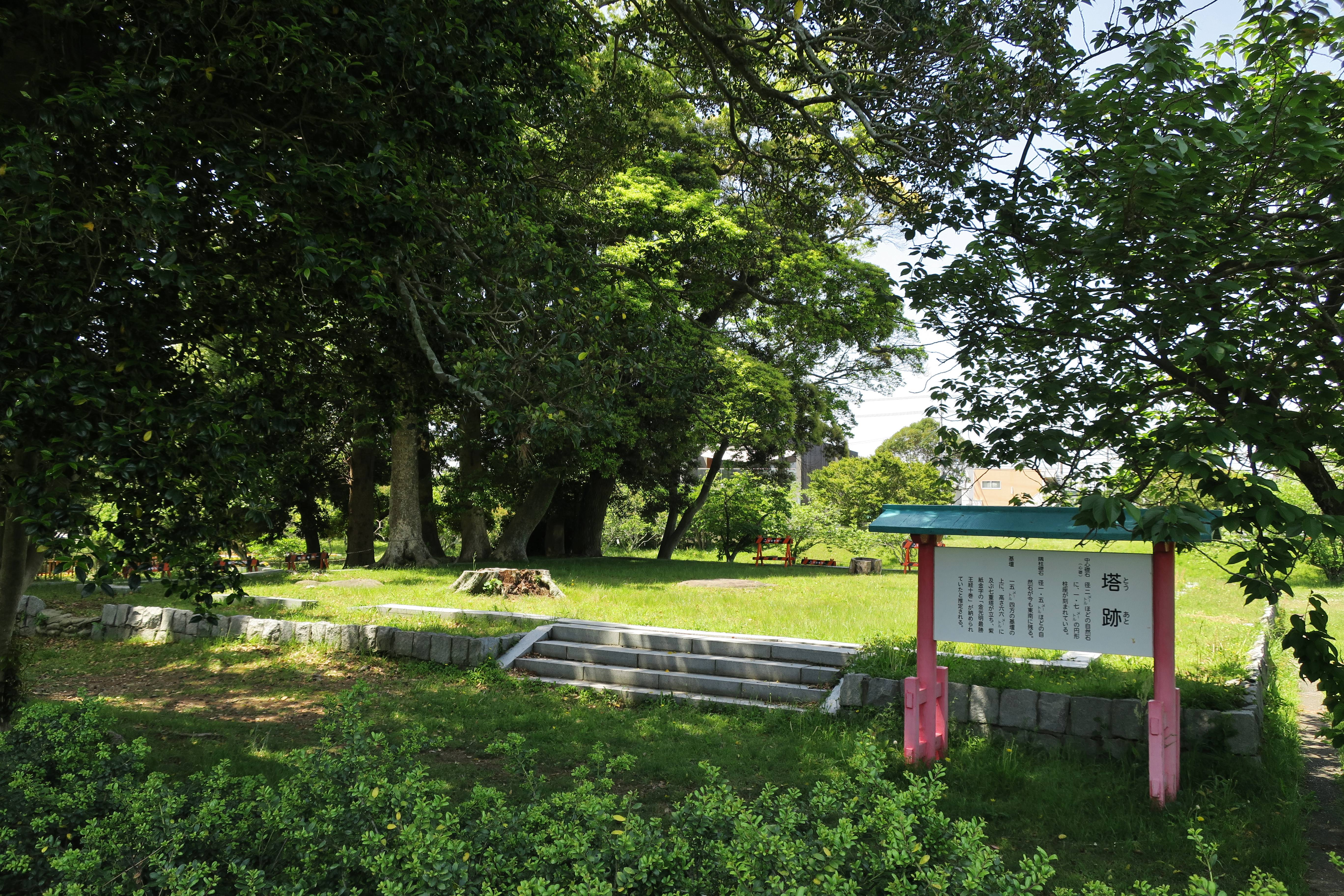
Site of the Pagoda

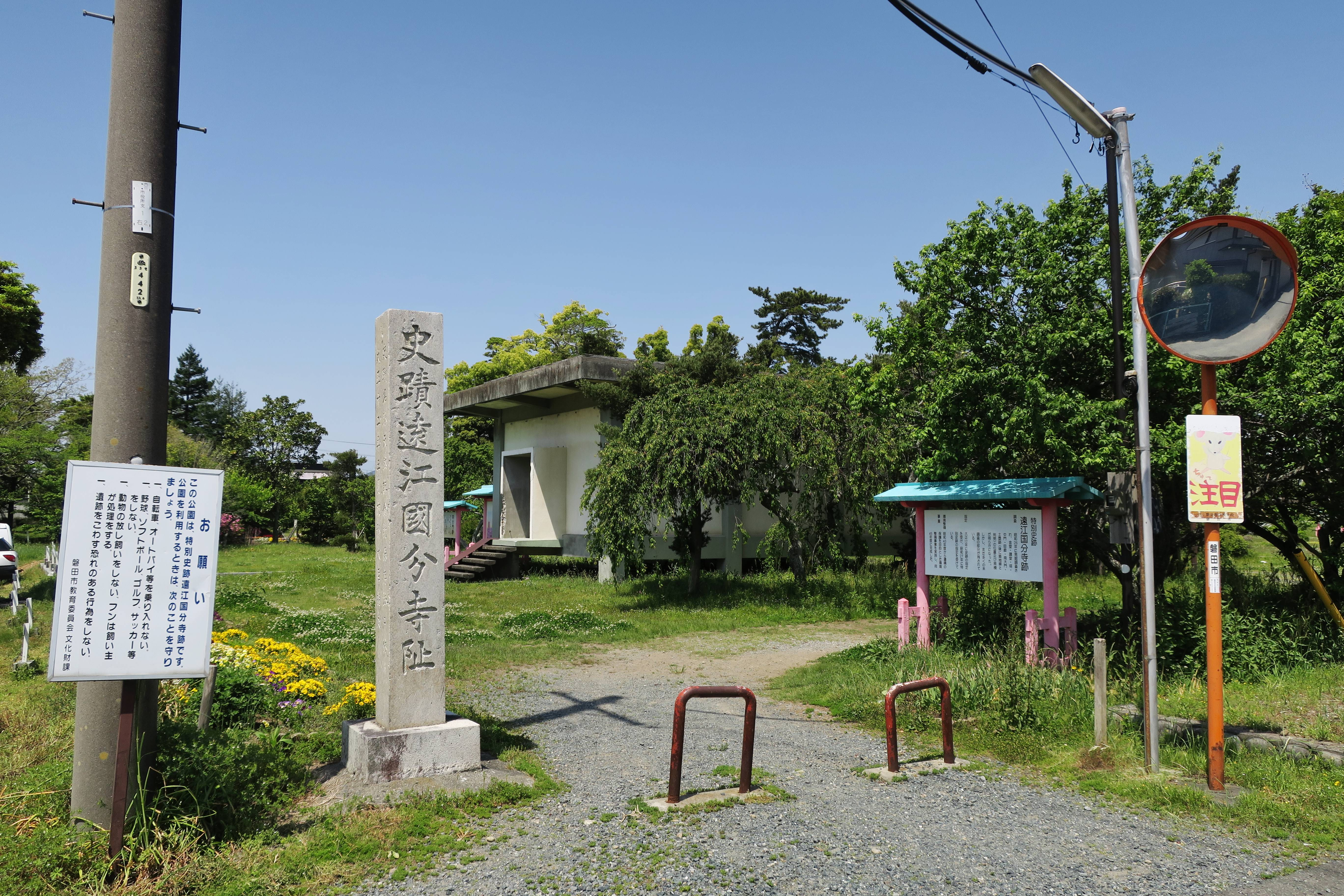
Site of the South Gate

== See also ==
- List of Historic Sites of Japan (Shizuoka)
- provincial temple
