= Provincial temple =

Type of temple in Japan

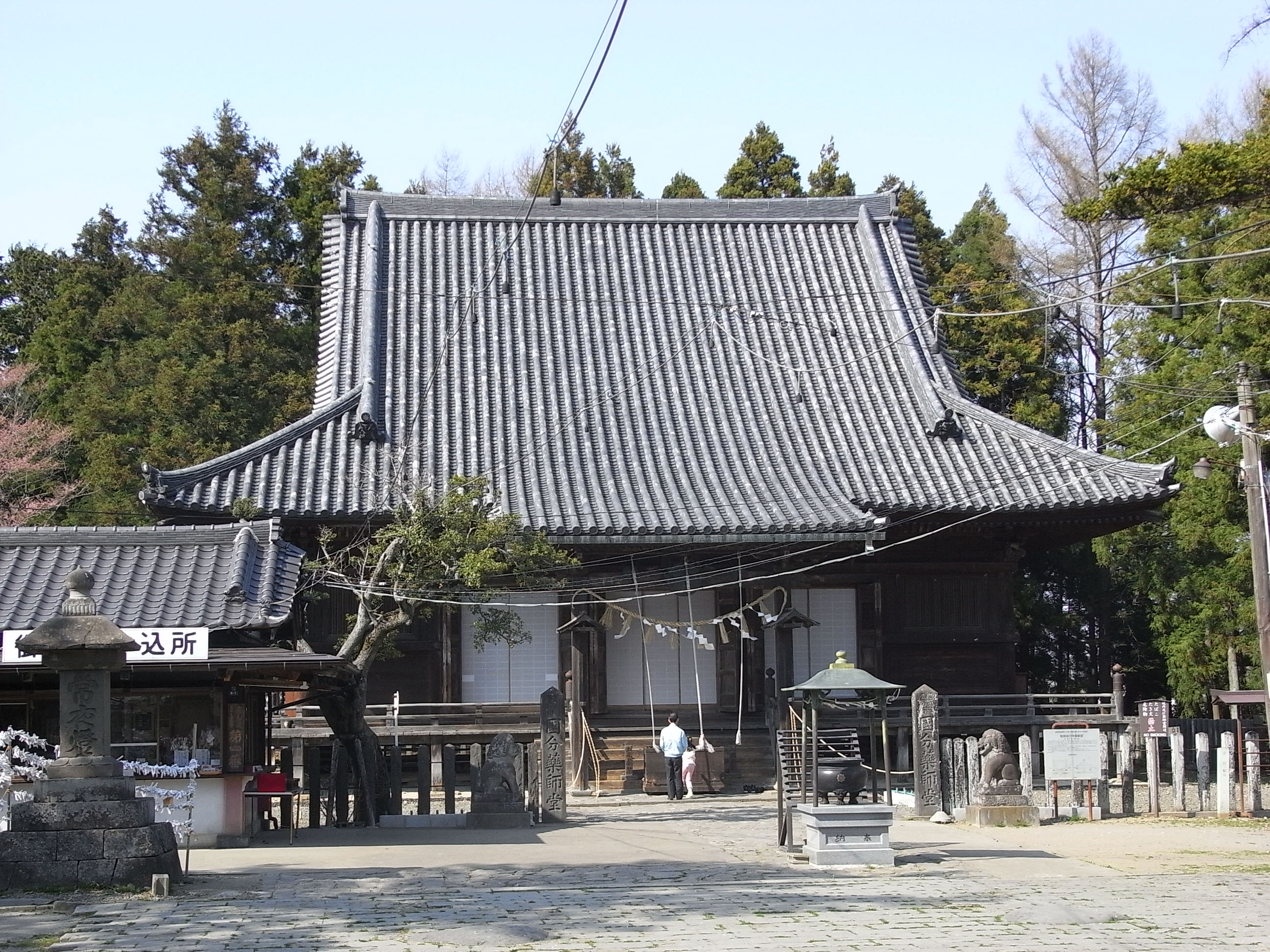
Mutsu Kokubunji —Yakushido

The Kokubun-ji (国分寺; Japanese pronunciation: [kò̞.kɯ̈́.bɯ̈́ɲ̟́.ɟ̟͡ʑí]) are Buddhist temples established in each of the provinces of Japan by Emperor Shōmu during the Nara period (710 – 794). The official name for each temple was Konkomyo Shitenno Gokoku-ji (Konkōmyō Shitennō Gokoku-ji )

== History ==
The Shoku Nihongi records that in 741, as the country recovered from a major smallpox epidemic, Emperor Shōmu ordered that a monastery and nunnery be established in every province. Each temple was to have one statue of Shaka Nyorai and two attendant Bodhisattva statues, and a copy of the Large Prajñāpāramitā Sūtras. Later, it was added that each temple must also have a seven-story pagoda, copies of ten volumes of the Lotus Sutra and a copy of the Golden Light Sutra in golden letters. To provide funds for the upkeep, each temple and nunnery was to be assigned 50 households and 10 chō of paddy fields (approximately 10 hectares). Each temple would have 20 monks and each nunnery would have 10 nuns. These temples were built to a semi-standardized template, and served both to spread Buddhist orthodoxy to the provinces, and to emphasize the power of the Nara period centralized government under the Ritsuryō system.

The precedent for this system was the Daxingshan Temples built by Emperor Wen and Yang Jian, who founded the Sui dynasty. Later, in the Tang dynasty, there were Daun-ji provincial temples built by Empress Wu Zetian, Ryuko-ji provincial temples built by Emperor Zhongzong, and Kaigen-ji provincial temples) built by Emperor Xuanzong.

However, despite the edict, the expense for creation of these temples was very great, and the kokushi of most provinces procrastinated on construction. In November 747, the exasperated emperor transferred the construction system from kokushi to the gunji, or a county-level administrator and granted hereditary succession of the post upon completion of the temple. This led to the full-scale construction of most provincial temples. Most of the kokubunji were located in or near the provincial capitals, and, together with the provincial offices, were the largest buildings in the province. In addition, Todai-ji and Hokke-ji in Yamato Province were designated as the head temple and head nunnery for the system. The kokubunji system persisted into the mid-Heian period, but as the Ritsuryō system began to collapse and financial support from the government disappeared, many of the provincial temples and provincial nunneries fell into disuse. A considerable number of provincial temples continued to exist even into the modern period, but as temples of a different sect or with a different character from the original provincial temples. Many of the provincial nunneries were not restored. Many of the sites of the original temples and nunneries are known, and some have been designated National Historic Sites after archaeological excavations.

List of Kokubunji
Kokubun-ji	Location	HS&successor	Kokubun-niji	Location	HS&successor
Head Kokubun-ji			Head Kokubun-niji		
Tōdai-ji	Zoshicho, Nara, Nara	NHS; Tōdai-ji	Hokke-ji	Hokkejicho, Nara, Nara	NHS; Hokke-ji
Kinai region
Yamato Kokubun-ji	Zoshicho, Nara, Nara	NHS; Tōdai-ji	Yamato Kokubun-niji	Hokkejicho, Nara, Nara	NHS; Hokke-ji
Yamashiro Kokubun-ji	Kamo-cho Reihei Kizugawa, Kyoto	NHS（Kuni-kyō（Yamashiro Kokubun-ji ruins）） Yamashiro Kokubun-ji	Yamashiro Kokubun-niji	（推定）Hokkejino, Kamō-cho, Kizugawa, Kyoto	-none- -none-
Kawachi Kokubun-ji	Kokubu Tojo, Kashiwara, Osaka	-none- Shingoshu Kawachi Kokubun-ji	Kawachi Kokubun-niji	（推定）Kokubu Tōjōcho, Kashiwara, Osaka	-none- -none-
Izumi Kokubun-ji	Kokubunji-cho, Izumi, Osaka	-none- Gokokuzan Kokubun-ji	Izumi Kokubun-niji	(Unknown)	-none-
Settsu Kokubun-ji	Kokubuncho, Tennōji-ku, Osaka	-none- Tentokuzan Kokubun-ji; Gokokuzan Kongō-in Kokubun-ji	Settsu Kokubun-niji	（推定）Shibashima, Higashiyodogawa-ku, Osaka	-none- Tenpyo Shōhōzan Hokke-ji
Tōkaidō
Iga Kokubun-ji	Saimyōji, Iga, Mie	NHS; Kami-terayama Kokubun-ji	Iga Kokubun-niji	Saimyōji, Iga, Mie	NHS (Chōrakuzan temple ruins） Ryūōzan Kikushō-in Hokke-ji
Ise Kokubun-ji	Kokubun-cho, Suzuka, Mie	NHS; Gokokuzan Jinsei Maruto-in Kokubun-ji; Myōjōsan Kokubun-ji; Jōkeizan Konkōmyō-in Kokubun-ji	Ise Kokubun-niji	(Unknown)	-none-
Shima Kokubun-ji	Ago-cho, Shima, Mie	Mie PHS; Gokoku-san Kokubunji	Shima Kokubun-niji	（Unknown）	-none-
Owari Kokubun-ji	Yago-cho, Inazawa, Aichi	NHS; Suzuokiyama Kokubun-ji	Owari Kokubun-niji	Hokkeji-cho, Inazawa, Aichi (?)	Daireizan Hokke-ji
Mikawa Kokubun-ji	Yawata-cho, Toyokawa, Aichi	NHS; Kokufushozan Kokubun-ji	Mikawa Kokubun-niji	Yawata-cho, Toyokawa, Aichi	NHS -ruins-
Tōtōmi Kokubun-ji	Mitsuke, Iwata, Shizuoka	S.NHS; Sankeizan Enmei-in Kokubun-ji	Tōtōmi Kokubu-niji	（Unknown）	-none-
Suruga Kokubun-ji	Ōtani, Suruga-ku, Shizuoka	NHS; Ryūzũyama Kokubun-ji	Suzuga Kokubun-niji	（Unknown）	-none- （伝）Shōgakusan Bodaijū-iin
Izu Kokubun-ji	Izumi-cho, Mishima, Shizuoka	NHS (pagoda base only); Hōjūsan Kokubun-ji	Izu Kokubun-niji	Minami-cho, Mishima, Shizuoka	-none- Mishimasan Hokke-ji
Kai Kokubun-ji	Ichinomiya-cho Kokubun, Fuefuki, Yamanashi	NHS; Gokokusan Kokubun-ji	Kai Kokubun-niji	Higashihara, Ichinomiya-cho, Fuefuki, Yamanashi	NHS -none-
Sagami Kokubun-ji	Kokubu-minami Ebina, Kanagawa	NHS; Tōkōzan Iōin Kokubun-ji	Sagami Kokubun-niji	Kokubu-kita, Ebina, Kanagawa	NHS -none-
Musashi Kokubun-ji	Nishimotocho, Kokubunji, Tokyo	NHS; Iōzen Saishōin Kokubun-ji	Musashi Kokubun-ji	Nishimotocho, Kokubunji, Tokyo	NHS -none-
Awa Kokubun-ji	Kokubun, Tateyama, Chiba	PHS; Nisshikizan Kokubun-ji	Awa Kokubun-niji	(Unknown)	-none-
Kazusa Kokubun-ji	Sōza, Ichihara, Chiba	NHS; Iōzan Seijō-in Kokubun-ji	Kazusa Kokubun-niji	Kokubunjidai-chuo, Ichihara, Chiba	NHS -none-
Shimōsa Kokubun-ji	Kokubu, Ichikawa, Chiba	NHS; Kokubu Kokubun-ji	Shimōsa Kokubun-niji	Kokubu, Ichikawa, Chiba	NHS -none-
Hitachi Kokubun-ji	Fuchu, Ishioka, Ibaraki	S.NHS; Jōrurizan Tōhō-in Kokubun-ji	Hitachi Kokubun-niji	Wakamatsu, Ishioka, Ibaraki	S.NHS -none-
Tōsandō
Ōmi Kokubun-ji	（推定）Kise, Kōka, Shiga （within Shigaraki Palace） （推定）Seta temple ruins, Ōtsu, Shiga （推定）Hikarigaokacho, Ōtsu, Shiga （Kokushoji Temple ruins, Ōtsu）	1：NHS（Shigaraki Palace） Besshōzan Kokubun-ji	Ōmi Kokubun-niji	（Unknown）	-none- -none-
Mino Kokubun-ji	Aono-cho, Ōgaki, Gifu	NHS; Kinginzan Ruriko-in Kokubun-ji	Mino Kokubun-niji	（推定）Hirao, Fuwa District, Tarui, Gifu	-none- -none-
Hida Kokubun-ji	Sowa-cho, Takayama, Gifu	NHS (Pagoda only); Iozan Hida Kokubun-ji	Hida Kokubun-niji	Okamotocho, Takayama, Gufu; Tsujigamori Jinja ruin	CHS; Kenshōzan Kokubun-ji
Shinano Kokubun-ji	Kokubu, Ueda, Nagano	NHS; Shinano Kokubun-ji	Shinano Kokubun-niji	Kokubu, Ueda, Nagano	HS -none-
Kōzuke Kokubun-ji	Higashikokubu, Takasaki, Gunma	NHS; Kokubun-ji	Kōzuke Kokubun-niji	Higashikokubu, Takasaki, Gunma	NHS -none-
Shimotsuke Kokubun-ji	Kokubunji, Shimotsuke, Tochigi	NHS; Rurikozan Anyo-in Kokubun-ji	Shimotsuke Kokubun-niji	Kokubunji, Shimotsuke, Tochigi	NHS -none-
Mutsu Kokubun-ji	Wakabayashi-ku, SendaiMiyagi	NHS; Gokokusan Io-in Kokubun-ji	Mutsu Kokubun-niji	Shirahagi-cho, Wakabayashi-ku, Sendai, Miyagi	NHS; Gokokuzan Mutsu Kokubun-niji
Dewa Kokubun-ji	（推定）Jowa, Sakata, Yamagata （推定)	1：NHS（Dōnomae ruins） Gokokuzan Hakusan-ji	Dewa Kokubun-niji	（Unknown）	-none- -none-
Hokurikudō
Wakasa Kokubun-ji	Kokubu, Obama, Fukui,	NHS; Wakasa Kokubun-ji	Wakasa Kokubun-niji	（Unknown）	-none- -none-
Echizen Kokubun-ji	（Unknown）	-none- Gokokusan Kokubun-ji	Echizen Kokubun-niji	（Unknown）	-none- -none-
Kaga Kokubun-ji	（推定）Kofucho, Komatsu, Ishikawa	-none- -none-	Kaga Kokubun-niji	（Unknown）	-none- -none-
Noto Kokubun-ji	Kokubuncho, Nanao, Ishikawa	NHS -none-	Noto Kokubun-niji	（Unknown）	-none- -none-
Etchū Kokubun-ji	Fushiki Ichinomiya Takaoka, Toyama	PHS; Etchu Kokubun-ji	Etchū Kokubun-niji	Fushiki Ichinomiya, Takaoka, Toyama	-none- -none-
Echigo Kokubun-ji	（推定）Kokufu, Jōetsu, Niigata	-none- Ankokusan Kezō-in Kokubun-ji	Echigo Kokubun-niji	（Unknown）	-none- -none-
Sado Kokubun-ji	Kokubunji, Sado, Niigata	NHS; Iozan Ruriko-in Kokubun-ji	Sado Kokubun-niji	（Unknown）	-none- -none-
San'indō
Tanba Kokubun-ji	Kokubu, Chitose-cho, Kameoka, Kyoto	NHS; Gokokuzan Kokubun-ji	Tanba Kokubun-niji	Kawarajiri, Kawarabayashi-cho, Kameoka, Kyoto	-none- -none-
Tango Kokubun-ji	Kokubu, Miyazu, Kyoto	NHS; Gokokuzan Kokubun-ji	Tango Kokubun-niji	（Unknown）	-none- -none-
Tajima Kokubun-ji	Hidaka Kokubunji, Toyooka, Hyogo	NHS; Giokokuzan Kokubun-ji	Tajima Kokubun-niji	Hidaka, Toyooka, Hyogo	-none- Tendaizan Hokke-ji
Inaba Kokubun-ji	Kokubunji, Kokufu-cho, Tottori, Tottori	-none- Saishōzan Kokubun-ji	Inaba Kokubun-niji	-none- -none-	
Hōki Kokubun-ji	Kokubunji, Kurayoshi, Tottori	NHS; Gokokuzan Kokubun-ji	Hōki Kokubun-niji	（推定）Kokubunji, Kurayoshi, Tottori	-none- -none-
Izumo Kokubun-ji	Takeyacho, Matsue, Shimane	NHS -none-	Izumo Kokubun-niji	Takeyacho, Matsue, Shimane	-none- -none-
Iwami Kokubun-ji	Kokubuncho, Hamada, Shimane	NHS; Tōkō-zan Kokubun-ji	Iwami Kokubun-niji	Kokubuncho, Hamada, Shimane	PHS; Ryōshōzan Kōmyō-ji
Oki Kokubun-ji	Ikeda, Okinoshima, Shimane	NHS; Zenōzan Kokubun-ji	Oki Kokubun-niji	Yuki, Okinoshima, Shimane	PHS -none-
San'yōdō
Harima Kokubun-ji	Mikunomachi Kokubunji, Himeji, Hyōgo	NHS; Ushidōzan Kokubun-ji	Harima Kokubun-niji	Kokubunji, Himeji, Hyōgo	-none- Kongō-san Tokushō-ji
Mimasaka Kokubun-ji	Kokubunji, Tsuyama, Okayama	NHS; Ryujusan Kokubun-ji	Mimasaka Kokubun-niji	Kokubunji, Tsuyama, Okayama	-none- -none-
Bizen Kokubun-ji	Umaya, Akaiwa, Okayama	NHS; Konkōzan Enju-in Zenkyō-ji	Bizen Kokubun-niji	Umaya, Hosaki, Akaiwa, Okayama	-none- -none-
Bitchū Kokubun-ji	Kamibayashi, Sōja, Okayama	NHS; Nisshōzan Sōjiin Kokubunji	Bitchū Kokubun-niji	Kamibayashi, Sōja, Okayama	NHS -none-
Bingo Kokubun-ji	Kannabe-cho, Fukuyama, Hiroshima	-none- Karaoyama Iō-in Kokubun-ji	Bingo Kokubun-niji	（推定）Kannabe-cho, Fukuyama, Hiroshima	-none- -none-
Aki Kokubun-ji	Saijō-cho Yoshiyuki, Higashihiroshima, Hiroshima	NHS; Kinjōzan Jōkō-in Kokubun-ji	Aki Kokubun-niji	（推定）Saijō-cho Yoshiyuki, Higashihiroshima, Hiroshima	-none- -none-
Suō Kokubun-ji	Kokubunjicho, Hōfu, Yamaguchi	NHS; Jōrurizan Kokubun-ji	Suo Kokubun-niji|	Kokubunjicho, Hōfu, Yamaguchi	-none- Jōkaizan Hokke-ji
Nagato Kokubun-ji	Miyanouchi-cho, Chofu, Shimonoseki, Yamaguchi	-none- Jōrurizan Kokubun-ji	Nagato Kokubun-niji	（推定）Chōfu, Shimonoseki, Yamaguchi	-none- -none-
Nankaido
Kii Kokubun-ji	Higashi-Kokubu, Kinokawa, Wakayama	NHS; Hakkōzan Iōin Kokubun-ji	Kii Kokubun-niji	（推定）Nishikokubu, Iwade, Wakayama	-none-: none -
Awaji Kokubun-ji	Yagi Kokubu Minamiawaji, Hyogo	NHS (pagoda site); Awaji Kokubun-ji	Awaji Kokubun-niji	（推定）Yagi, Minamiawaji, Hyogo	-none- Kinunzan Rishō-in
Awa Kokubun-ji	Kokufu-cho Yano, Tokushima, Tokushima	PNHS; Yakuōzan Konjiki-in Kokubun-ji	Awa Kokubun-niji	Meizai, Ishii, Tokushima	NHS -none-
Sanuki Kokubun-ji	Kokubu Kokubunji-cho, Takamatsu, Kagawa	SNHS; Hakuushizan Senju-in Kokubun-ji	Sanuki Kokubunni-ji	Arai Kokubunji-cho, Takamatsu, Kagawa	NHS; Daijisan Hokke-ji
Iyo Kokubun-ji	Kokubuncho, Imabari, Ehime	NHS (pagoda site); Konkōzan Saishō-in Kokubun-ji	Iyo Kokubun-niji	（推定）Sakuraim Imabari, Ehime	PHS (pagoda site); Fudarakuzan Hokke-ji
Tosa Kokubun-ji	Kokubun, Nankoku, Kōchi	NHS; Mani-san Hōzō-in Kokubun-ji	Tosa Kokubun-niji	（Unknown）	-none- -none-
Saikaidō
Chikuzen Kokubun-ji	Kokubu, Dazaifu, Fukuoka	NHS; Ryutōkōzan Kokubun-ji	Chikuzen Kokubun-niji	Kokubu, Dazaifu, Fukuoka	-none- -none-
Chikugo Kokubun-ji	Kokubuncho, Kurume, Fukuoka	CHS; Gokokuzan Kokubun-ji	Chikugo Kokubun-niji	（推定）Kokubuncho, Kurume, Fukuoka	-none- -none-
Buzen Kokubun-ji	Kokubu Miyako, Fukuoka	NHS; Konkōmyōzan Kokubun-ji	Buzen Kokubun-niji	（推定）Tokusei, Kokubu, Miyako Fukuoka	-none- -none-
Bungo Kokubun-ji	Kokubu, Oita, Oita	NHS; Iōzan Kokubun-ji	Bungo Kokubun-niji	（推定）Kokubu, Oita, Oita	-none-
Hizen Kokubun-ji	Yamatocho Niji, Saga, Saga	PHS; Konkomyoozan Kokubun-ji	Hizen Kokubun-niji	Yamatocho Niji, Saga, Saga	-none- -none-
Higo Kokubun-ji	Izumi, Chuo-ku, Kumamoto	-none- Iōzan Kokubun-ji	Higo Kokubun-niji	Izumi, Chuo-ku, Kumamoto	-none- -none-
Hyūga Kokubun-ji	Mitake, Saito, Miyazaki	NHS -none-	Hyūga Kokubun-niji	Umatsu, Saito, Miyazaki	-none- -none-
Ōsumi Kokubun-ji	Kokubu Chuo, Kirishima, Kagoshima	NHS -none-	Ōsumi Kokubun-niji	（Unknown）	-none- -none-
Satsuma Kokubun-ji	Kokubunjicho, Satsumasendai, Kagoshima	NHS -none-	Satsuma Kokubun-niji	（推定）Amatsucho, Satsumasendai, Kagoshima	-none- -none-
Iki Kokubun-ji	Kokubu Honmura, Ashiba Iki, Nagasaki	PNS; Gokokuan Kokubun-ji	Iki Kokubun-niji	（Unknown）	-none- -none-
Tsushima Kokubun-ji	（推定）Izuhara Imayashiki, Tsushima, Nagasaki	-none- Tentōkuzan Kokubun-ji	Tsuhima Kokubun-niji	（Unknown）	-none- -none-

(Key: NHS= National Historic Site, PHS=Prefectural Historic Site, CHS= City Historic Site)

== Modern place names ==
Modern place names based on this etymology include:

- Kokubunji, Kagawa
- Kokubunji, Tokyo
- Kokubunji, Tochigi

== See also ==
- 735–737 Japanese smallpox epidemic
- Fuchū
- Glossary of Japanese Buddhism
- Ichinomiya (primary shrines of the province)
- Soja shrine (shrines that consolidated the deity for every province)
- Kokufu
