= Katayama temple ruins =

Archaeological site in Shizuoka, Japan

- 片山廃寺跡 (Japanese)
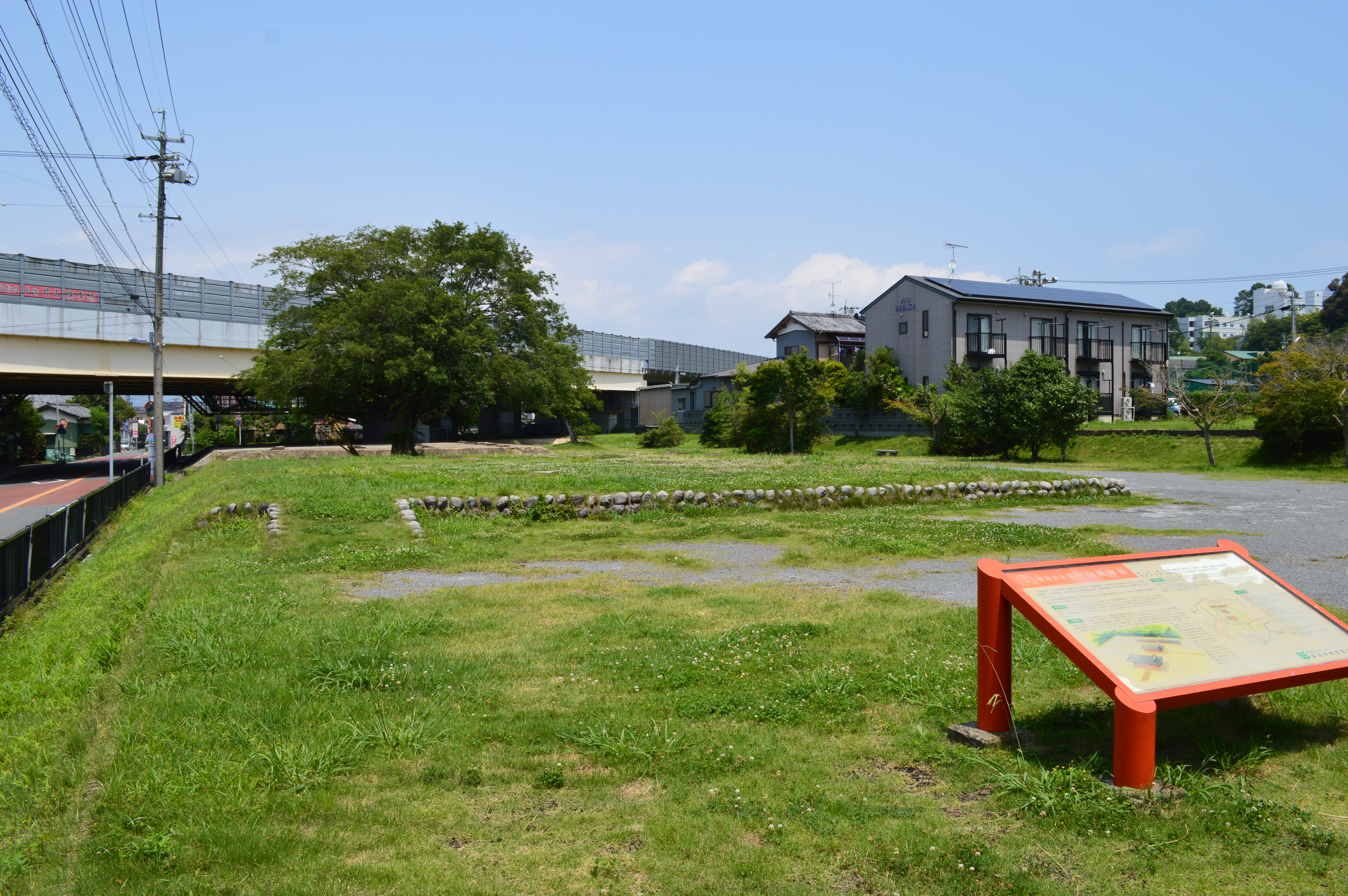
- Katayama temple ruins

- Katayama temple ruins Katayama temple ruins (Japan)
- Interactive map of Katayama temple ruins
- 34°57′51.23″N 138°25′35.84″E
- Type: temple ruins
- Periods: Nara - Heian period
- Location: Suruga-ku, Shizuoka, Japan
- Region: Chubu region

History
- Built: c.8th century AD

Site notes
- Public access: Yes (no public facilities)

The Katayama temple ruins (片山廃寺跡, Katayama haji ato) is an archaeological site with the ruins of a late Nara period Buddhist temple located in the Ōya neighborhood of Suruga-ku in the city of Shizuoka, Japan. The temple no longer exists, but the ruins were designated as a National Historic Site in 1965.

== Overview ==
The Katayama temple site consists of the ruins of a temple complex located about 3.5 kilometers southeast of JR Tōkai Shizuoka Station, and were discovered during highway construction in 1930. The precincts measure approximately 160 meters square, but recent excavations have revealed the presence of a row of pillar holes running north-south on the west side of the estimated temple grounds. These are thought to be the remains of a wooden fence supported by wooden pillars. The ruins dates from the late 8th century to the early 10th century (late Nara period to early Heian period). The site was partially excavated in 1948 and again in 1958, during which time the foundations of a Kondō, Kōdō (Lecture Hall) and Rectory were discovered. The Kondō was a 7x4 bay hall, measuring 30.9 meters by 17 meters. The Kōdō was also a 7x4 bay hall, measuring 25.5 meters by 15.8 meters. The rectory had 23 cells, with an estimated length of between 68.2 and width of between 9.1 and 10.9 meters. Traces of charred wood indicate that the temple was destroyed by a fire.

From the layout of the ruins and its large size, a theory was advanced that this was the site of the lost kokubun-ji of Suruga Province, although due to the lack of a pagoda, a theory was also advanced that the temple was the private monastery of a great landholder in ancient Udo Country. The discovery of the foundations of a pagoda in 2009 further reinforced the possibility that the ruin is that of a kokubun-ji.

A large refuse pile was discovered approximately 500 meters south of the temple ruins which was found to contain a large number of roof tiles from the abandoned temple. In addition, tile shards at the Miyagawa kiln ruins, approximately one kilometer to the south of the Katayama temple site correspond to the same tiles as were found at this refuse pile. The Miyagawa kiln ruins contain two noborigama kilns and one flat kiln. The kiln site and the refuse pile were both added to the National Historic Site designation in 1974.

The temple appears to have been destroyed by a fire at some unknown time. The preservation of the site is poor, as it is located underneath an overpass of the Tōmei Expressway and a prefectural road cuts through the ruins.

== Gallery ==
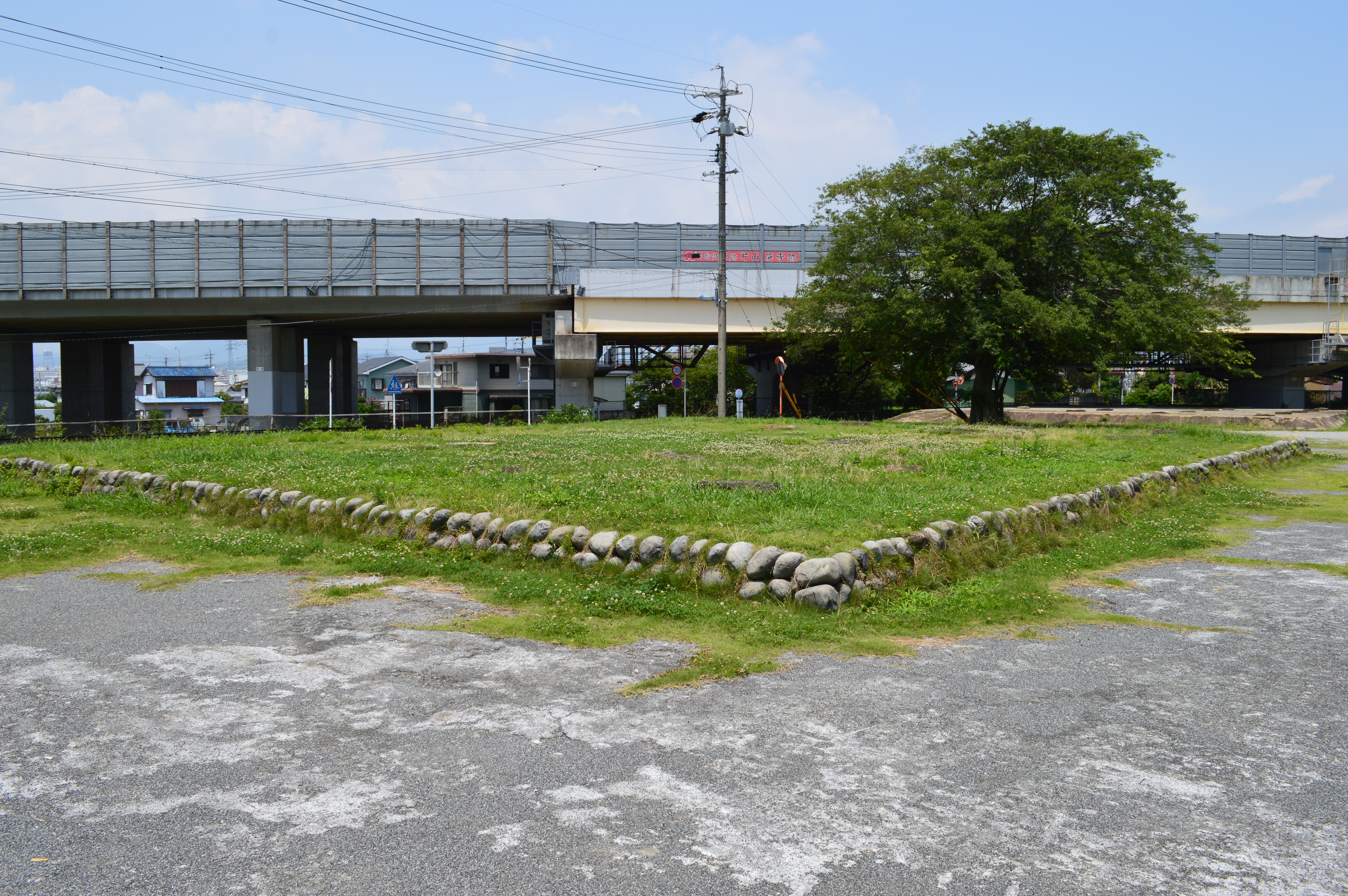
site of the Kondō

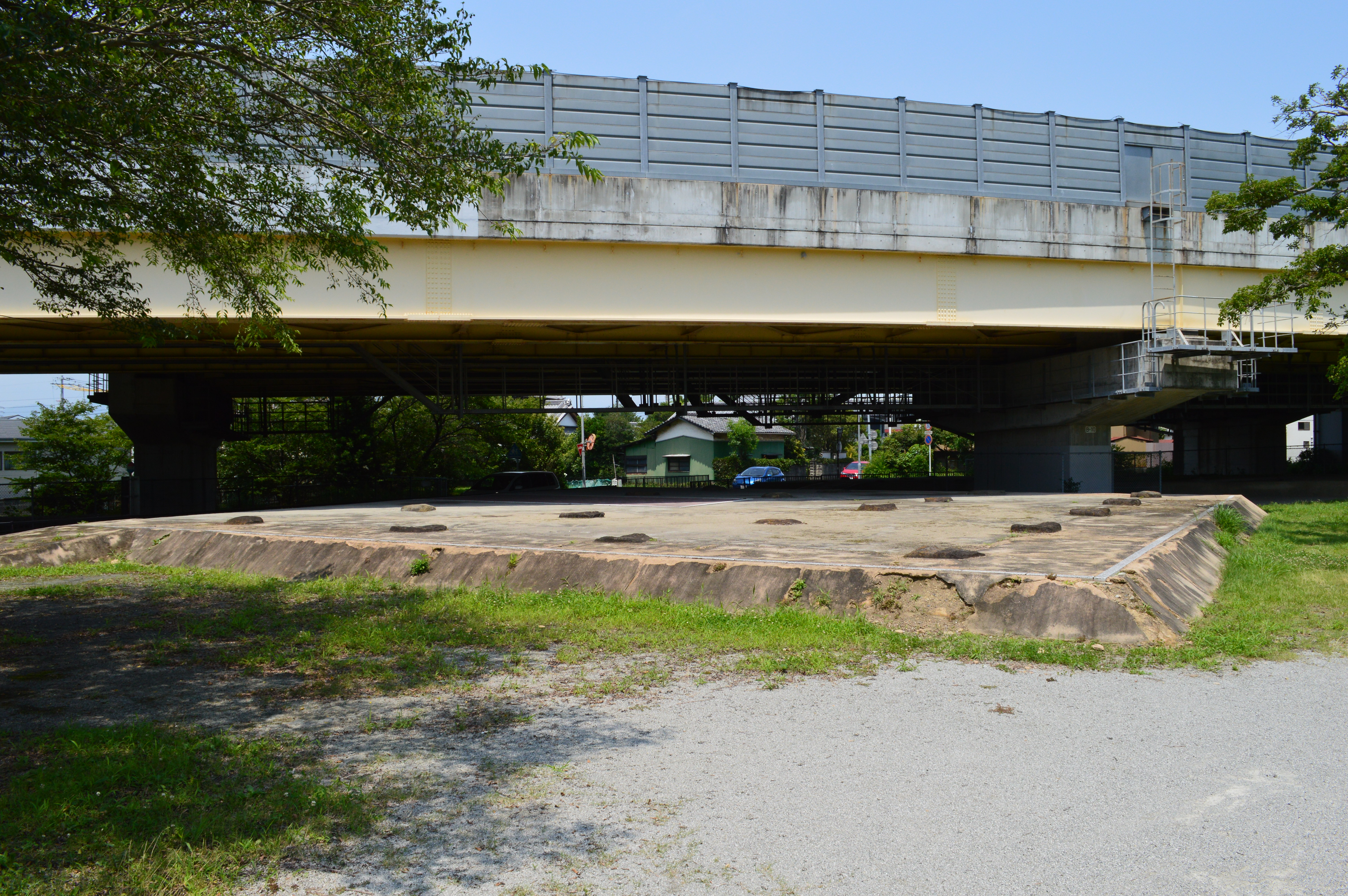
site of the Lecture Hall

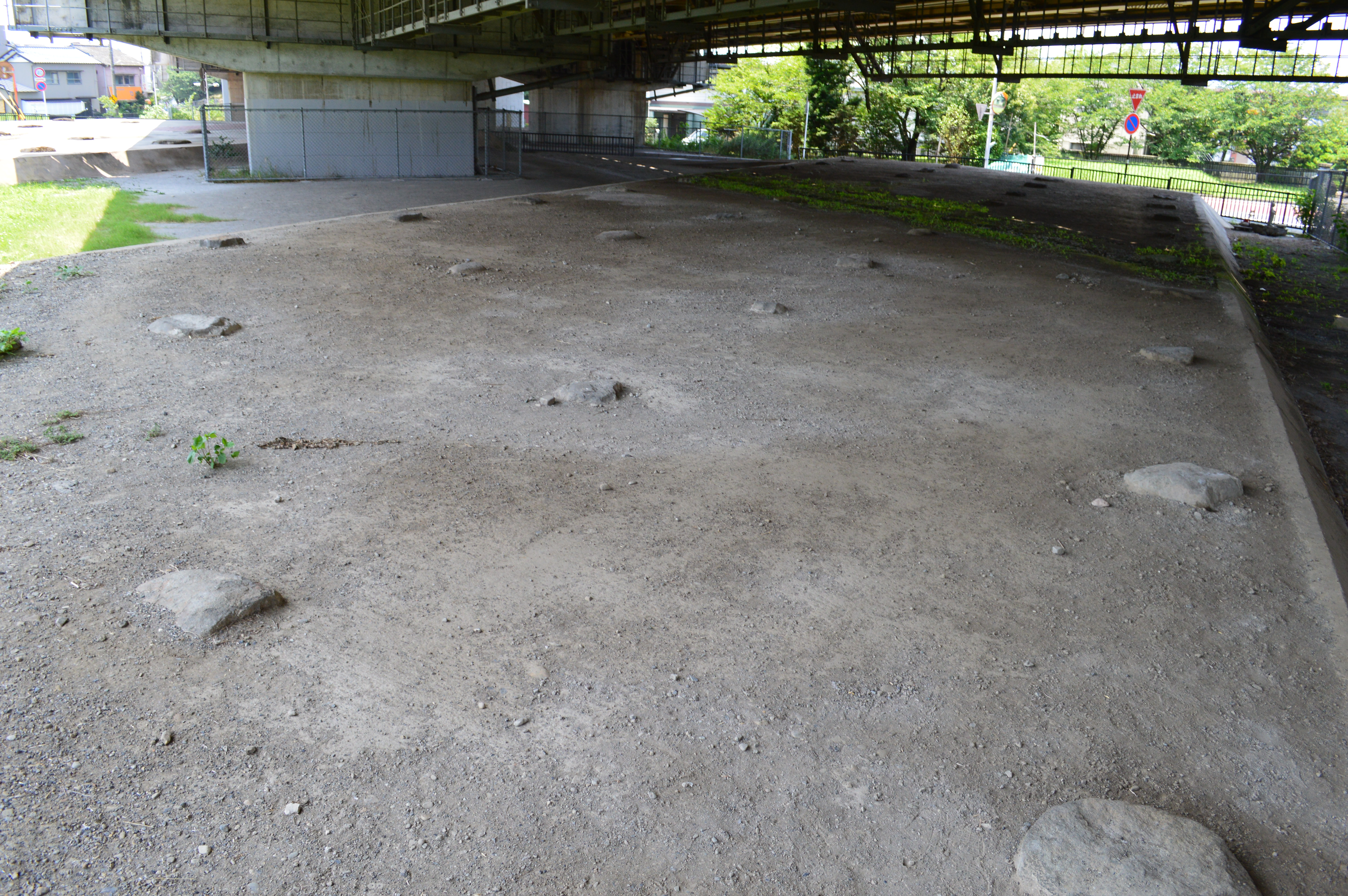
site of the Rectory

== See also ==
- List of Historic Sites of Japan (Shizuoka)
- Provincial temple
