= 735–737 Japanese smallpox epidemic =

Smallpox epidemic that afflicted much of Japan

- Disease: Smallpox
- Location: Japan
- Dates: 735–737 CE
- Deaths: 1 million

The 735–737 Japanese smallpox epidemic (天平の疫病大流行, Tenpyō no ekibyō dairyūkō; "Epidemic of the Tenpyō era") was a smallpox epidemic that afflicted much of Japan. Killing approximately one third (around 1 million individuals) of the entire Japanese population, the epidemic had significant social, economic, and religious repercussions throughout the country.

== Origins ==
A few decades prior to the outbreak, Japanese court officials had adopted the Chinese policy of reporting disease outbreaks among the general population. This recording practice greatly facilitated the identification of smallpox as the disease that afflicted Japan during the years 735–737.

Increased contact and trade between Japan and the Asian mainland, directly and through Korea, had led to more frequent and serious outbreaks of infectious diseases, including smallpox. The smallpox epidemic of 735–737 was recorded as having taken hold around August 735 in the city of Dazaifu, Fukuoka in northern Kyushu. The infection had ostensibly been carried by a shipwrecked Japanese fisherman who had contracted the illness after being stranded on the Korean peninsula. The disease spread rapidly throughout northern Kyushu that year, and persisted into the next year. By 736, many land tenants in Kyushu were either dying or forsaking their crops, leading to poor agricultural yields and ultimately famine.

Also in the year 736, a group of Japanese governmental officials passed through northern Kyushu while the epidemic was intensifying. As members of the party sickened and died, the group abandoned its intended mission to the Korean peninsula. Returning to the capital with smallpox, the officials helped spread the disease to eastern Japan and Nara. The disease continued to ravage Japan in 737. One manifestation of the pandemic's great impact was that by August of 737, a tax exemption had been extended to all of Japan.

Based on fiscal reports, adult mortality for the smallpox epidemic of 735–737 has been estimated at 25–35% of Japan's entire population, with some areas experiencing much higher rates. All levels of society were affected. Many court nobles died due to smallpox in 737, including all four brothers of the politically powerful Fujiwara clan: Fujiwara no Muchimaro (680–737), Fujiwara no Fusasaki (681–737), Fujiwara no Umakai (694–737), and Fujiwara no Maro (695–737). Their sudden departure from the royal court allowed for the ascension of noted rival Tachibana no Moroe to a high official position in the court of Emperor Shōmu.

The epidemic not only killed a large segment of the population, it triggered significant dislocation, migration, and imbalance of labor throughout Japan. Highly affected occupations included construction and farming, especially rice cultivation.

== Court response ==
In the sixth month of 737, as the epidemic reached the capital, the Council of State sent the provincial governors an order of seven articles on caring for the sick, preserved in the Ruijū fusenshō. It calls the disease "red spot sores" and describes several days of fever before the sores appear, with diarrhea as they heal, which it treats as the most dangerous stage. The sick were to keep the belly bound and warm, lie on a raised bed with a reed mat rather than on the ground, and eat rice gruel, but not cold water, ice, fresh fish or meat, raw vegetables or fruit. For at least twenty days after recovery they were not to bathe or go out in wind and rain. Pills and powders were forbidden; a fever in the chest was to be treated only with ginseng broth. Each province was to copy the order, send it on to the next, and give relief from government stores to those who had nothing to make gruel with.

== Aftermath ==
In addition to the granting of tax waivers, Japan's nobles took other unprecedented actions in response to the effects of the epidemic to help stem widespread population migration and to reinvigorate the farming communities. For example, several years after the smallpox epidemic had run its course, the Japanese leaders attempted to stimulate agricultural productivity by offering private land ownership to those willing to work farmland.

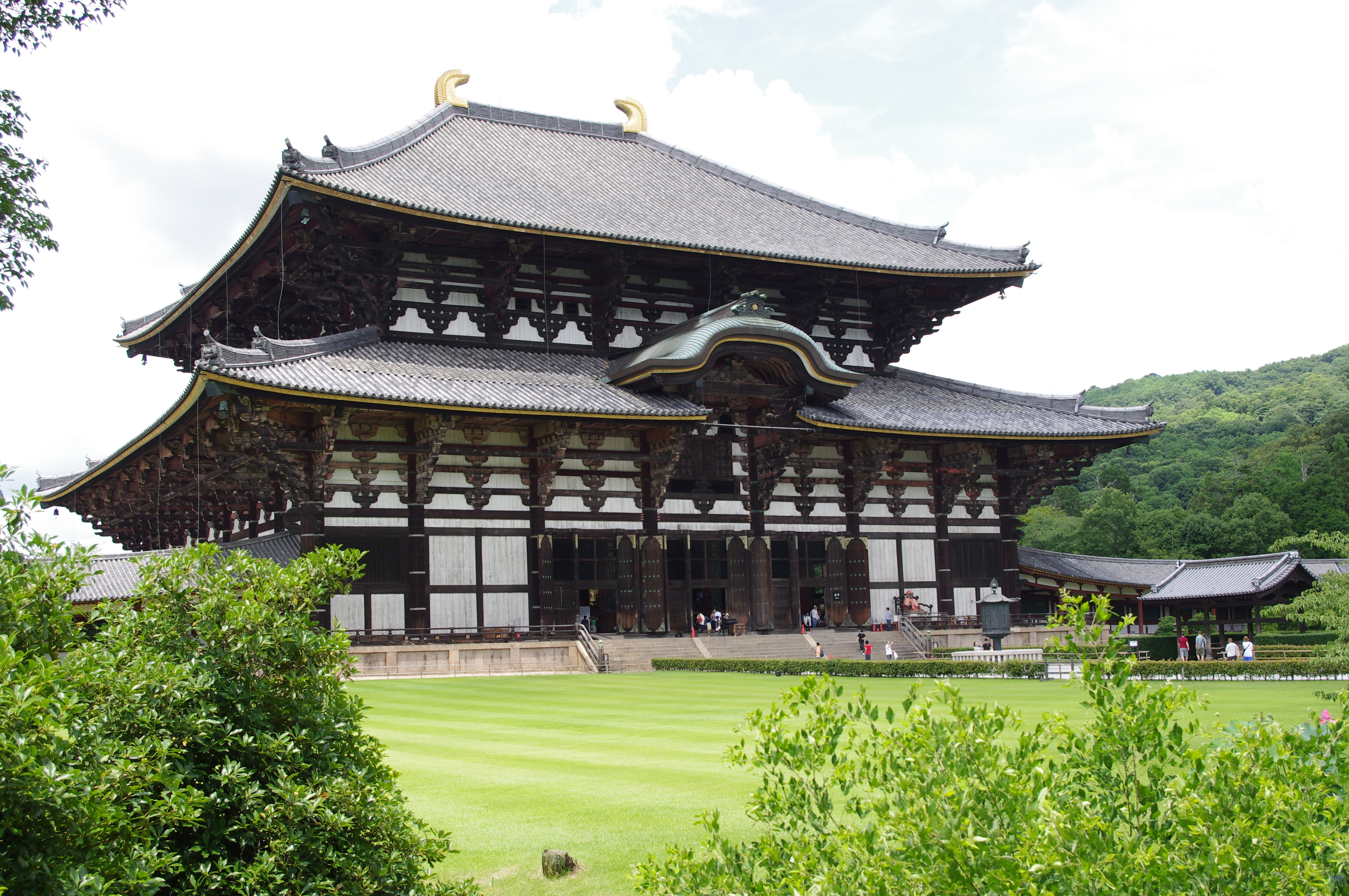
The Daibutsuden at Tōdai-ji

Also around this time Emperor Shōmu, who felt personally responsible for the tragedy, greatly increased the official support of Buddhism by commissioning the construction of the grand temple Tōdai-ji and its Daibutsu or large Buddha statue. He also provided significant financial support for the construction of other provincial temples (the kokubunji (国分寺)), statues, and related religious structures throughout the country. The cost to cast the Daibutsu alone has been said to have nearly bankrupted the country.

Over the next several centuries, Japan continued to experience smallpox epidemics. But by the early part of the 2nd millennium, smallpox had become endemic to the Japanese population and thus less devastating during outbreaks.

== See also ==
- Smallpox demon
