= Ryūgakuji Kofun Cluster =

Ryūgakuji kofun cluster
- 龍角寺古墳群 (Japanese)
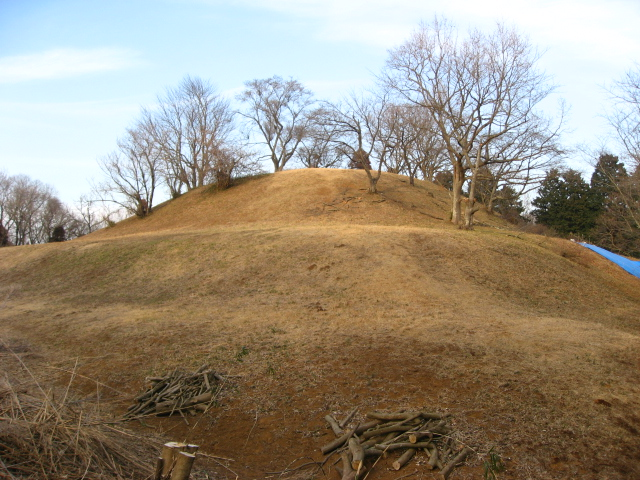
- Iwaya kofun in the Ryūgakuji kofun cluster

- Ryūgakuji kofun cluster Ryūgakuji Kofun Cluster (Japan)
- 35°49′16″N 140°16′38″E
- Type: kofun
- Periods: Kofun period
- Location: Sakae / Narita, Japan
- Region: Kantō region

Site notes
- Public access: Yes (park and museum)

Ryūgakuji kofun cluster (龍角寺古墳群, Ryūgakuji kofun-gun) is a group of Kofun period burial mounds located in what is now the Ryukakuji neighborhood of the town of Sakae and extending into the city of Narita, Chiba Prefecture in the Kantō region of Japan. The site was designated a National Historic Site of Japan in 1941, with the area extended in 2009. Containing 114 tumuli, it is the largest cluster of kofun in the Kantō region. The National Historic Site designation also singles out Kofun No. 105, which is named the Iwaya kofun (岩屋古墳).

== Overview ==
The Ryūgakuji kofun cluster dates from the late Kofun period (end of the 6th century to the end of the 7th century AD), and is located on what was once the northeastern coast of Lake Inbanuma. The area is part of the Shimōsa Plateau with an elevation of about 30 meters above sea level. The site is relatively narrow, and the tumuli are distributed in strips over the narrow plateau from the northwest to the southeast for about 1.5 kilometers. The total number of tumuli currently confirmed is 114, although many may have been destroyed by road construction and urban encroachment, and others may yet to be discovered. The types of these 114 tumuli are distributed as follows:

Ryūgakuji Kofun Cluster
Type	Narita	Sakae	Total
Domed (empun (円墳))	19	52	71
Square (hōfun (方墳))	1	5	6
Keyhole (zenpō-kōen-fun (前方後円墳))	9	28	37
TOTAL	29	85	114

Most of the tumuli are well preserved and more than 70 percent are located on prefectural lands. At present, the oldest is believed to be scallop-shaped Kofun No.101, which was constructed in the second quarter of the 6th century AD based on the type of haniwa discovered. The later mounds are concentrated in the northeast corner of the site, and include the Sengenyama Kofun, which is believed to be the last kofun built in Chiba Prefecture. From these dates, it is clear that the tumulus-building culture continued well after the introduction of Buddhism to the area in the Hakuho period as evidenced by the nearby ruins of the Buddhist temple of Ryūkaku-ji. Many of the tumuli are small, with a length of 20 to 30 meters in the case of keyhole-shaped tumuli, and a diameter of 10 to 20 meters in the case of many dome-shaped burial mounds.

Some of the larger mounds were found to have more than one burial chamber, or had been reused for a subsequent burial some period after its original construction. Haniwa have been found only at 16 tumuli, but the majority of the tumuli remain unexcavated.

Artifacts recovered from the site are exhibited at the Chiba Prefectural Bōsō Mura no Fudoki no Oka Museum (千葉県立房総のむら風土記の丘資料館, Chiba-kenritsu Bōsō Mura no Fudoki no Oka Shiryōkan). The site is a five minute walk from the Fudoki no Oka Kitaguchi bus stop on the Chiba Kotsu Bus from Ajiki Station on the JR East Narita Line

== Iwaya Kofun ==
The Iwaya Kofun is Kofun No. 105 in the cluster. It is a square-sided tumulus hōfun (方墳)) and is the largest tumulus in the cluster. The tumulus is approximately 78 meters on each side, and is built in three tiers similar to a step pyramid, with a total height of 13 meters. Inside are two lateral-type stone-lined burial chambers constructed of blocks of soft limestone containing many fossilized shells. The tumulus has a double moat, enclosing an area measuring 108 meters east-to-west by 96 meters north-to-south. Since the entrance has been open since the Edo period, no grave goods have been discovered.

== See also ==
- List of Historic Sites of Japan (Chiba)
