= Shimōsa Sakura Aburada Pasture =

Shimōsa Sakura Aburada ranch
- 下総佐倉油田牧跡 (Japanese)
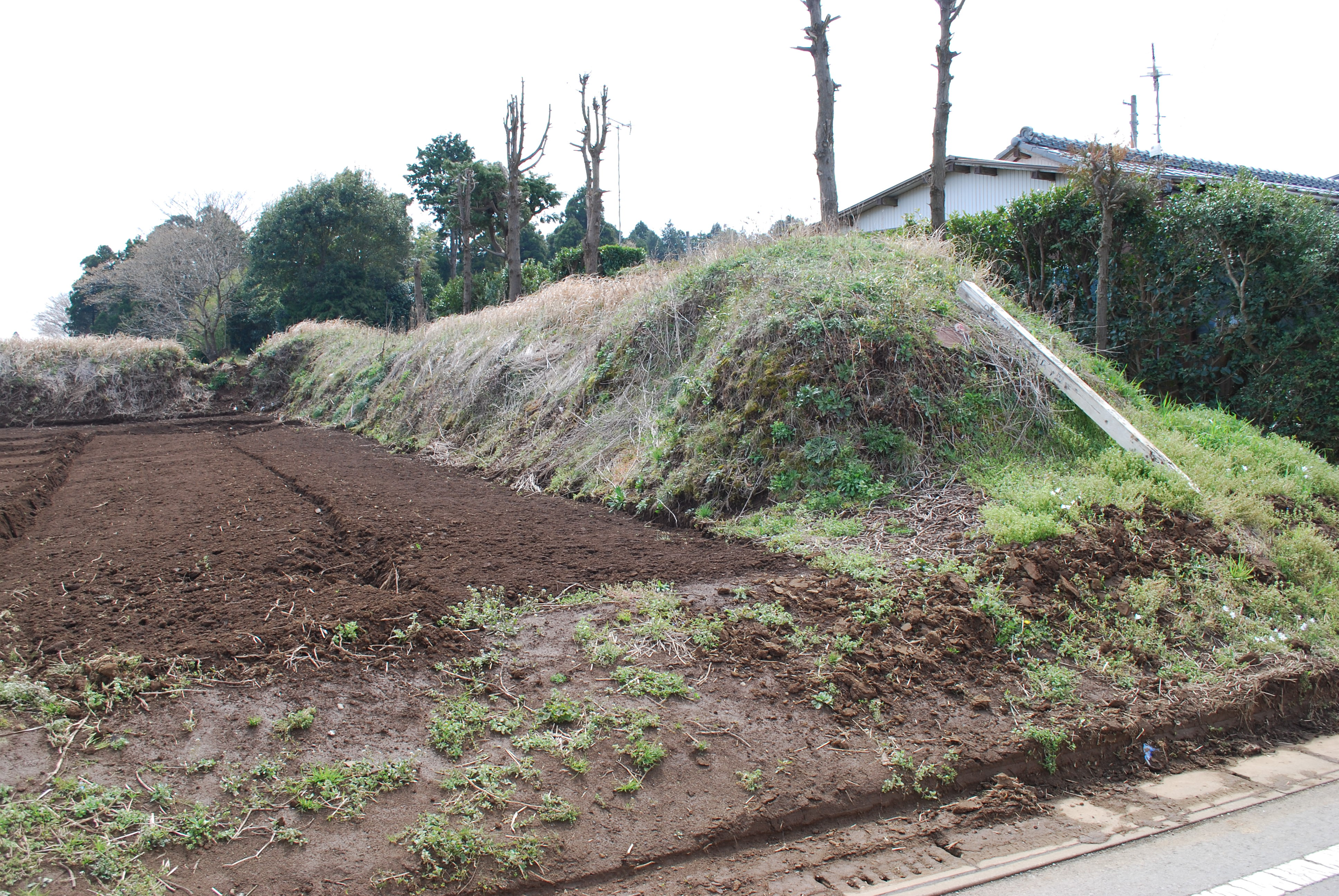
- Shimōsa Sakura Aburada maki ato

- Shimōsa Sakura Aburada maki ato Shimōsa Sakura Aburada Pasture (Japan)
- 35°50′20″N 140°29′31″E
- Periods: Edo period
- Location: Katori, Chiba, Japan
- Region: Kantō region

Site notes
- Public access: Yes

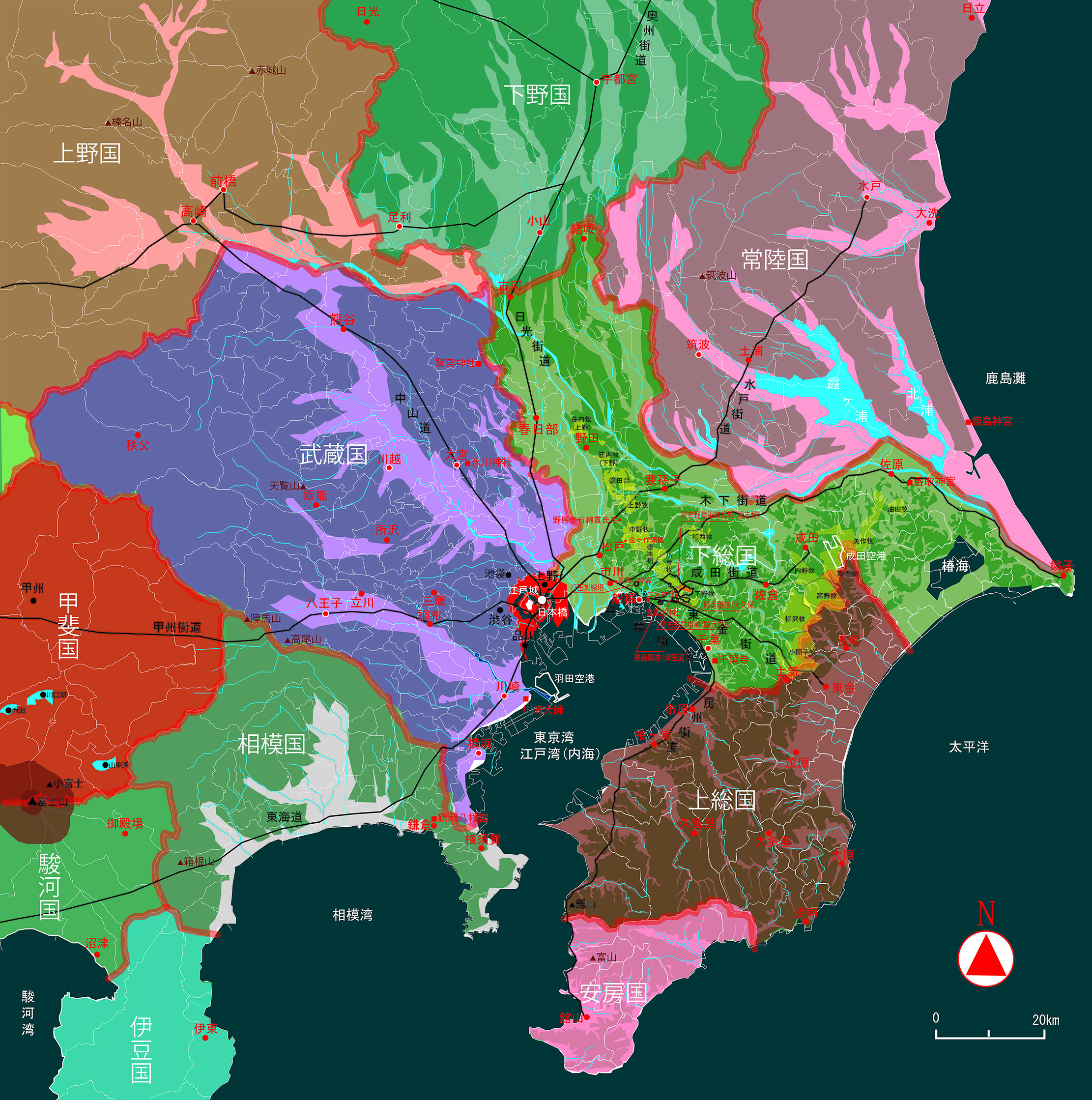
Location of the Sakura pastures (in light green)

The Shimōsa Sakura Aburada ranch (下総佐倉油田牧跡, Shimōsa Sakura Aburada maki ato) was a government-operated horse ranch during Edo Period of Japan, which operated to supply cavalry mounts for the Tokugawa shogunate. It was located in what is now part of the city of Katori, Chiba Prefecture in the Kantō region of Japan. The location was designated a National Historic Site of Japan in 2007.

== Overview ==
The Tokugawa shogunate established several horse ranches in the vicinity of Edo under its direct control in order to be assured of a reliable and constant supply of cavalry horses. These included several sites in Shimōsa Province, as well as a site in Awa Province and in Suruga Province. The pastures in Shimōsa were located on the vast Kantō plain, and was historically pasture land from at least the late Heian period. It was from this area that Taira no Masakado and later Minamoto no Yoritomo obtained their cavalry horses. Within Shimōsa, the horse ranches are divided into three groups, with Kogane pastures in the north, Sakura in the northeast and Mineoka in the south. The Sakura pastures occupied portions of what is now the municipalities of Yachimata, Tomisato, Narita, and Sawara, and were further subdivided into seven ranches, of which the Aburada ranch was the furthest to the northeast. It was roughly 4.7 kilometers east-to-west by 4.6 kilometers north-to-south, and has an area of about 10.1 square kilometers.

The horses raised on these ranches were wild horses allowed to roam freely in herds across the area. They were rounded up once a year to be broken for use by the military, with each horse farm having one capture site. The capture site at Aburada is still fairly well preserved, with a triangular area to funnel the horses into an enclosure surrounded by an earthen embankment with a height of three to five meters. Of the wild horses that were captured, three-year-old horses were trained for riding or were dismissed and sold off as farm or pack animals to the surrounding residents. Some were released back into the wild again after branding to identify which ranch they belonged to. The number of horses sold to commoners was very few, but provided a stable income for the ranch. The annual horse roundup became a tourist event which drew many sightseers from Edo. The embankments are in very good preservation, and are what is covered under the National Historic Site designation.

The Sakura pastures survived to the Meiji restoration of 1868, and portions were retained by the new Meiji government for providing mounts for the Imperial Japanese Army. Sanrizuka, where Narita Airport was later built, was one of these sites.

== See also ==
- List of Historic Sites of Japan (Chiba)
