= Torikakenishi Shell Mound =

Torikakenishi Shell Midden
- 取掛西貝塚 (Japanese)
- Torikakenishi Shell Midden Torikakenishi Shell Mound (Japan)
- Interactive map of Torikakenishi Shell Midden
- 35°42′56″N 140°00′38″E
- Type: shell midden
- Periods: Jōmon period
- Location: Funabashi, Chiba, Japan
- Region: Kantō region

Site notes
- Public access: Yes (park)

The Torikakenishi Shell Midden (取掛西貝塚, Torikakenishi kaizuka) is an archaeological site in the city of Funabashi, Chiba Prefecture, in the Kantō region of Japan containing an early Jōmon period shell midden and settlement ruin. The site was designated a National Historic Site of Japan in 2021.

== Overview ==
During the early to middle Jōmon period (approximately 4000 to 2500 BC), sea levels were five to six meters higher than at present, and the ambient temperature was also 2 deg C higher. During this period, the Kantō region was inhabited by the Jōmon people, many of whom lived in coastal settlements. The middens associated with such settlements contain bone, botanical material, mollusc shells, sherds, lithics, and other artifacts and ecofacts associated with the now-vanished inhabitants, and these features, provide a useful source into the diets and habits of Jōmon society. Most of these middens are found along the Pacific coast of Japan. Of the approximately 2400 shell middens throughout Japan, about 120 are concentrated in Chiba city.

The Torikakenishi site is located on a plateau approximately 25 meters above sea level, spanning Funabashi's Iiyama and Yonegasaki neighborhoods. Its area is approximately 76,000 square meters. Archaeological excavations have uncovered the remains of settlements with shell mounds from two periods: approximately 10,000 years ago (the early part of the Early Jomon period) and approximately 6,000 years ago (the first half of the Early Jomon period). The eastern coast of Tokyo Bay, including Funabashi, is home to the highest concentration of Jōmon period shell mounds in Japan, including Kasori Shell Mound (Chiba), Horinouchi Shell Mound (Ichikawa), and Sanya Shell Mound (Sodegaura). The Torikkakenishi Shell Mound is the oldest settlement site with a shell mound on the eastern coast of Tokyo Bay. Eight excavation surveys were conducted between 1999 and 2020, finding that the settlement area was approximately 320 meters east-west, approximately 100 meters north-south. In the partial surveys conducted so far, 58 pit dwelling remains from the Early Early Jōmon period (approximately 10,000 years ago) have been discovered. The pit dwellings were distributed across almost the entire plateau (however, not all of them were built at the same time). Another 18 pit dwelling remains from the early Jōmon period and six from the late middle Yayoi period have also been found. Thus, the Torikakenishi Shell Mound is the largest settlement site in the Kantō region from the Early Jōmon period.

The middens show a change the types of shellfish, from mainly shijimi from brackish waters in the early early Jōmon period to hamaguri cockles, and Pacific oysters (from the tidal flats of an inland bay) in the early Jōmon period. Other artifacts included Jōmon Pottery, stone tools (arrowheads, axes, plates, grinding stones, etc.), bone and horn and shell products (awls, arrowheads, Needles, personal ornaments, etc.), bird and animal bones, and carbonized seeds. The bird and animal bones came from a wide variety of species, indicating that the Jōmon diet was highly varied.

Of the approximately 39,000 square meters designated, approximately 7,654 square meters is city-owned land, and approximately 31,377 square meters is privately owned. The Torikakenishi Historic Site Park Museum (4-27-2 Kaijin, Funabashi City) has been built to display artifacts discovered.

The site is about 1.1 kilometer northwest from Hasama Station on the Tōyō Rapid Railway.

== See also ==
- List of Historic Sites of Japan (Chiba)
