= Bentenyama Kofun =

Kofun period burial mound in Fottsu, Japan

Bentenyama kofun
- 弁天山古墳 (Japanese)
- Bentenyama kofun Bentenyama Kofun (Japan)
- 35°16′54″N 139°51′30″E
- Type: kofun
- Periods: Kofun period
- Location: Futtsu, Chiba, Japan
- Region: Kantō region

Site notes
- Public access: Yes (no public facilities)

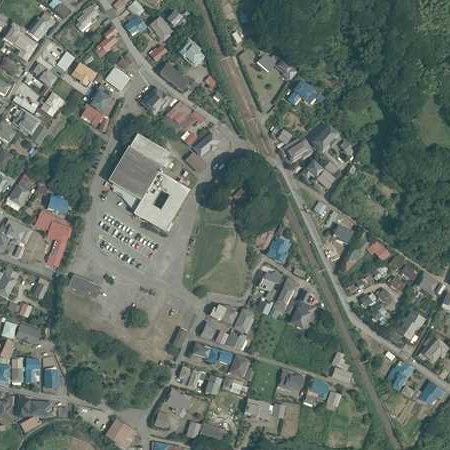
Aerial photograph of Bentenyama Kofun (Futtsu City, Chiba Prefecture).

The Bentenyama kofun (弁天山古墳) is a Kofun period burial mound located in what is now the Kokubo neighborhood of the city of Futtsu, Chiba Prefecture in the Kantō region of Japan. The site was designated a National Historic Site of Japan in 1929.

== Overview ==
The Bentenyama Kofun is a zenpō-kōen-fun (前方後円墳), which is shaped like a keyhole, having one square end and one circular end, when viewed from above. It is located in the southwestern part of the Bōsō Peninsula, on a low plateau overlooking Tokyo Bay near the mouth of the Iwase and Kokubo river just south of Cape Futtsu. It has an overall length of approximately 87.5 meters and was once surrounded by a wide moat. The tumulus suffered considerable damage at the end of Edo period when Sanuki Domain was transferred to Shimōsa Province, and cut away a portion of the tumulus to make space for the construction of a han school. A Shinto shrine was constructed on top of the circular portion of the tumulus. In 1927, during the construction of ten neighboring elementary school, this shrine and a portion of the circular portion of the tumulus collapsed, and the pit-type burial chamber was revealed. It was found to have megalithic stone walls and ceiling, with a length of 4.9 meters. A stone placed in the center of the ceiling has a lanyard protrusion, and it attracted attention as this feature is rarely seen in kofun outside of Yamato Province. This was used to lower the lid stone of the sarcophagus. Grave goods included iron swords and spears, fragments of armor and a helm, and a large number of cylindrical haniwa. From these relics, the construction period of the tumulus is considered to be in the latter half of the 5th century AD.

A survey for conservation and maintenance to prevent further collapse of the tumulus was conducted in 1971 and in 1975 to 1976. Concrete stairs provide public access to the top of the tumulus, and the stone sarcophagus and its lid are on display at a small adjacent building. The tumulus is about 20 minutes on foot from Onuki Station on the JR East Uchibō Line.

Total length
86 meters
Anterior rectangular portion
50 meters wide x 5.5 meters high, 2-tier
Posterior circular portion
53 meter diameter x 5.5 meters high, 2-tier

== See also ==
- List of Historic Sites of Japan (Chiba)
