= Yamazaki Shell Mound =

Yamazaki Shell Midden
- 山崎貝塚 (Japanese)
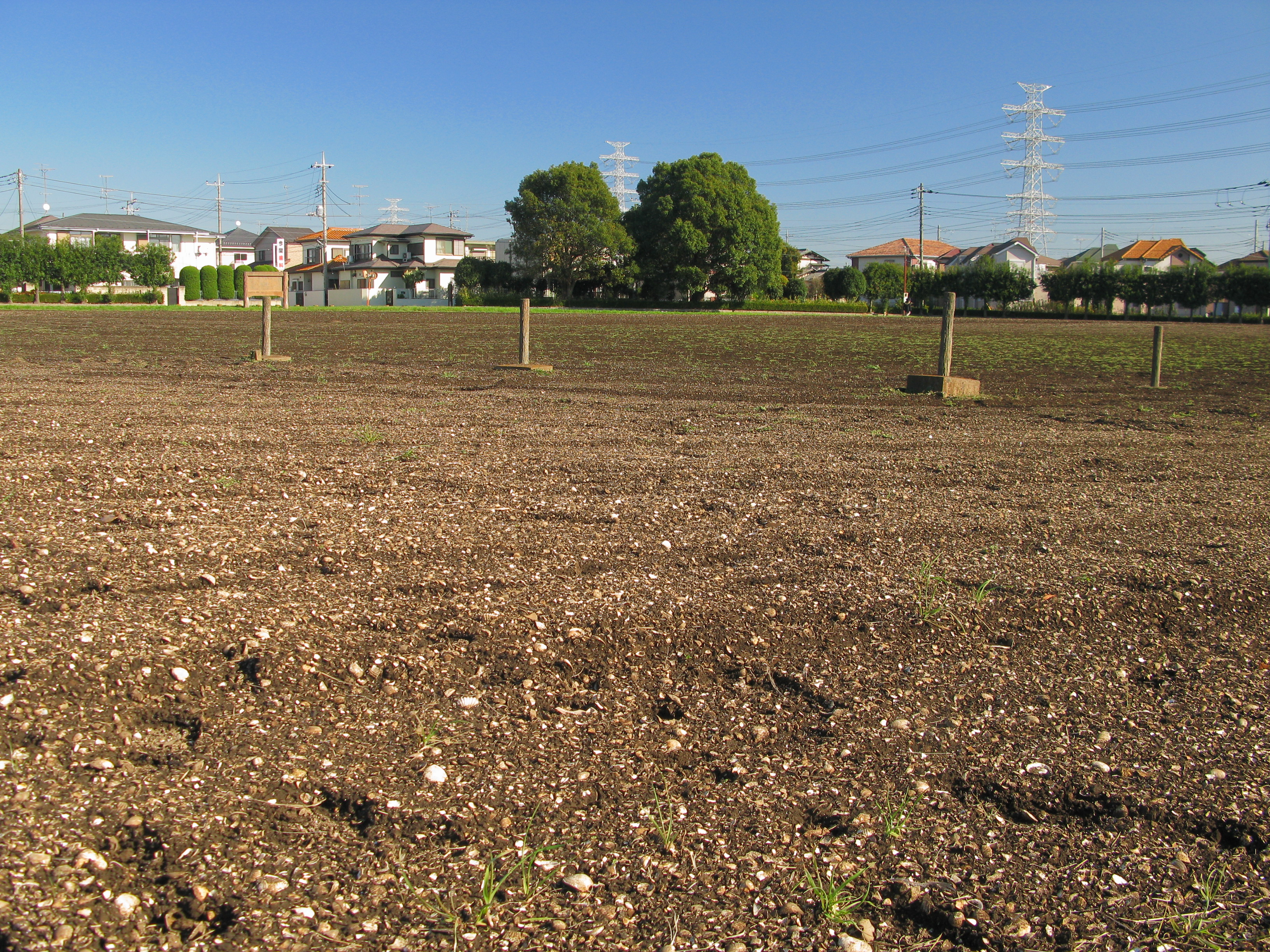
- Yamazaki Shell Midden

- Yamazaki Shell Midden Yamazaki Shell Mound (Japan)
- 35°55′18″N 139°53′39″E
- Type: shell midden
- Periods: Jōmon period
- Location: Noda, Chiba, Japan
- Region: Kantō region

Site notes
- Public access: Yes (park)

The Yamazaki Shell Midden (山崎貝塚, Yamazaki kaizuka) is an archaeological site in the Yamazaki-Kaizuka neighborhood of the city of Noda, Chiba Prefecture, in the Kantō region of Japan containing a Jōmon period shell midden and settlement ruin. The site was designated a National Historic Site of Japan in 1976, with the area under designation expanded in 1995.

== Overview ==
During the early to middle Jōmon period (approximately 4000 to 2500 BC), sea levels were five to six meters higher than at present, and the ambient temperature was also 2 deg C higher. During this period, the Kantō region was inhabited by the Jōmon people, many of whom lived in coastal settlements. The middens associated with such settlements contain bone, botanical material, mollusc shells, sherds, lithics, and other artifacts and ecofacts associated with the now-vanished inhabitants, and these features, provide a useful source into the diets and habits of Jōmon society. Most of these middens are found along the Pacific coast of Japan. Of the approximately 2400 shell middens throughout Japan, about 120 are concentrated in Chiba city.

The Yamazaki midden is located in the northwestern part of the Shimōsa Plateau, between the Tone River and the Edo River at an elevation of 17 meters. Although the area is now 26 kilometers inland, during the Jōmon period this was located on an inlet of ancient Tokyo Bay. It was initially surveyed in 1892 by a team from Tokyo Imperial University. Per a topographic survey and excavation in 1975, it was confirmed to have a double horseshoe shape consisting of two arc-shaped middens opening to the northeast and southwest, facing each other, forming a partial shell ring with a diameter of 130 meters.

It was first excavated in 1927 and was found to contain shells from both salt water and brackish water species in separate layers. Shellfish in lower layers were salt water species such as hamaguri and asari, whereas the upper layers were mostly of types typically found in brackish water, such as yamato-shijimi. The types of Jōmon pottery found in each layer was different, ranging from the middle to late Jōmon period (4000 – 3000 years ago), indicating that the midden was in constant use for many centuries, even as the environment changed and the sea level gradually dropped to the current topography. On the outside of the midden, were the foundations for 22 pit dwellings, and human remains were also found in an excavation in May 1960. Excavated artifacts included various types stone tools, polished stone axes, arrowheads, as well as float made from pumice and earthenware weights used for fishing.

The site is currently maintained and preserved as a historical park, with some of the artifacts preserved and exhibited at the Noda City Museum (野田市郷土博物館, Nodashi Kyōdo Hakubutsukan). The site is located 20 minutes on foot from Umesato Station on the Tōbu Noda Line.

== See also ==
- List of Historic Sites of Japan (Chiba)
