= Awa Kokubun-ji (Chiba) =

Buddhist temple in Tateyama, Japan

- 安房国分寺
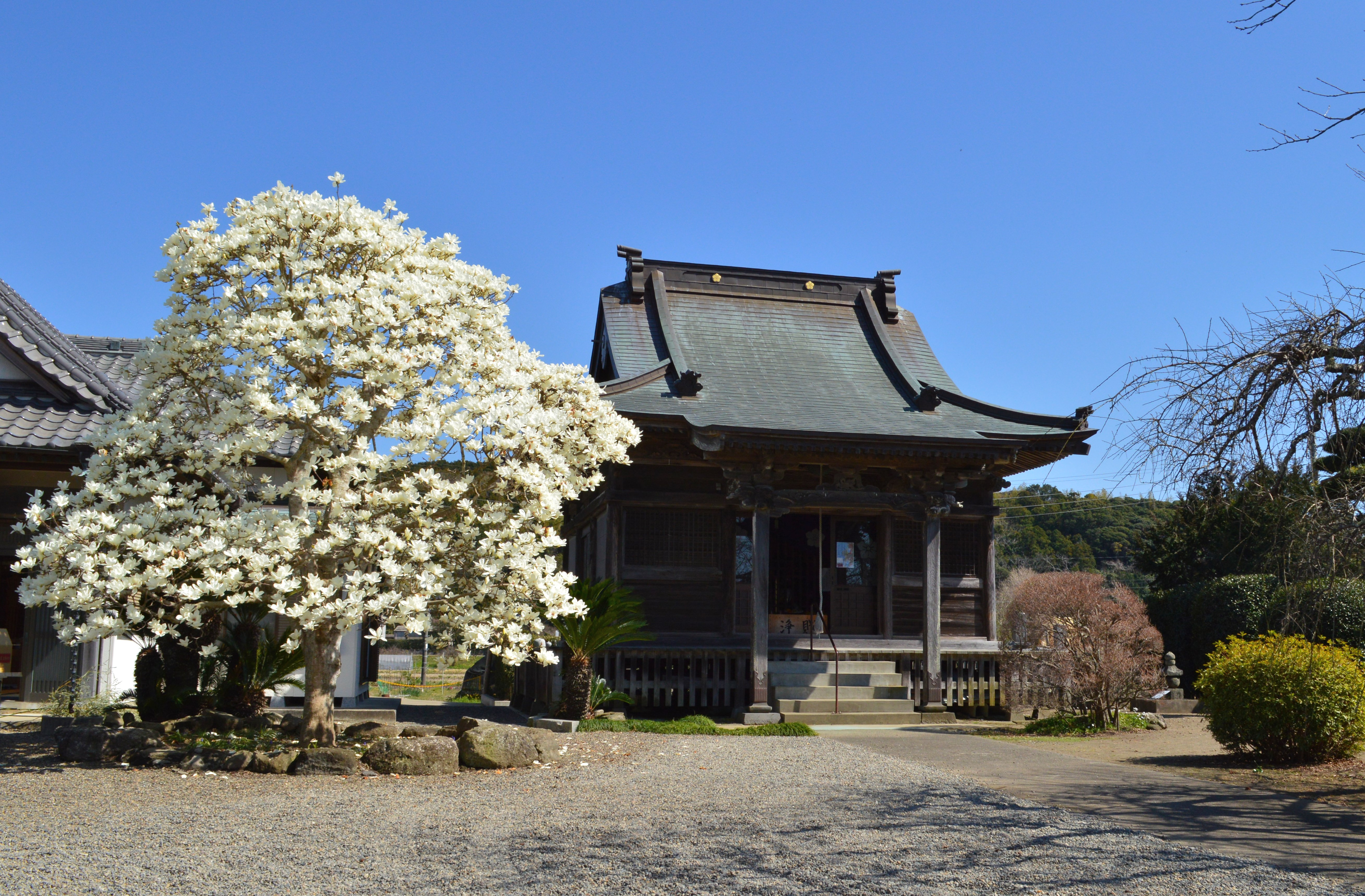
- Awa Kokubun-ji Hondo

- Location within Chiba Prefecture Location within Japan

Religion
- Affiliation: Buddhist
- Deity: Yakushi Nyōrai
- Rite: Shingon-shū Chisan-ha
- Status: functional

Location
- Location: 959-2 Kokubu, Tateyama-shi, Chiba-ken
- Country: Japan
- Interactive map of Awa Kokubun-ji
- Coordinates: 34°59′36.22″N 139°53′22.24″E

Architecture
- Founder: c.Emperor Shōmu
- Completed: c.9th century

The Awa Kokubun-ji (安房国分寺) is a Buddhist temple located in the Kokubun neighborhood of the city of Tateyama, Chiba, Japan. The temple belongs to the Shingon-shū Chisan-ha sect, and its main image is a statue of Yakushi Nyōrai. It is the modern successor of one of the provincial temples established by Emperor Shōmu during the Nara period (710 – 794) for the purpose of promoting Buddhism as the national religion of Japan and standardising control of imperial rule over the provinces. The foundation stones of the original temple was designated as a Tateyama city Historic Site in 1957, and a Chiba Prefectural Historic Site in 1992.

== Overview ==
The Shoku Nihongi records that in 741, as the country recovered from a major smallpox epidemic, Emperor Shōmu ordered that a monastery and nunnery be established in every province, the kokubunji (国分寺).

The Awa Kokubun-ji is located on a former sand dune (19 meters above sea level) east of Tateyama city, three kilometers from the coastline. The ruins of the Nara period temple-ji overlap with the current grounds, and the ruins of the former Kokubun-niji provincial nunnery are estimated to be located about 900 meters north. A road crosses the entrance to the temple from north-to-south, matching the remains of the Nara period jori system of land division that have been confirmed in the Tateyama Plain. According to the temple tradition the temple was founded in 727, before the imperial edict, when Kanoya Sunayo, a historian who accompanied the provincial governor to Awa, built a temple with a Yakushi Nyorai made by Gyōki as the principal image. However, due to the unique circumstances surrounding the establishment of the Kokubunji in Awa Province, unlike those in other provinces, it is believed to have been built later than the imperial edict ordering the construction of the temples. Although the edict for construction of kokubunji temples was issued in February 741, Awa Province was annexed by Kazusa Province in December of the same year. It was restored as a separate province in 757. There is no historical record of the foundation of Awa Kokubun-ji, but in the cases of other provinces (i.e. Izumi Province and Noto Province) which had been abolished in 741 and restored in 757, kokubunji were established in 839 and 843 respectively. Awa Kokubun-ji first appears in the historical record in 886, so it is believed that the temple was repurposed from an existing jogakuji (定額寺) temple (a private temple with official recognition) around the same time. In the provisions on taxation in the Engishiki, which was established in 927, there is no mention of the provincial temple in Awa Province, and is a theory that this was because taxes were appropriated from Kazusa Province. The subsequent history of the temple is largely unknown. A stupa dating to the Nanboku-cho period still exists in the modern temple's precincts, and records indicate that the Main Hall was rebuilt in 1735 in the Edo period.

Several archaeological excavations have been conducted within the area since 1976, and a foundation believed to be the Nara period Main Hall and a ditch dividing the temple grounds have been discovered, along with a large amount of seven-petal lotus pattern roof tiles, and a shard of sancai pottery in the shape of an animal leg, but no other building foundations have been found. The foundation measures 22 meters east-to-west and 15 meters north-to-south. Four cornerstones thought to be from the Nara period temple have been preserved within the current grounds, but are not in situ.

The temple is located about 2.5 kilometers east of Tateyama Station on the JR East Uchibo Line.

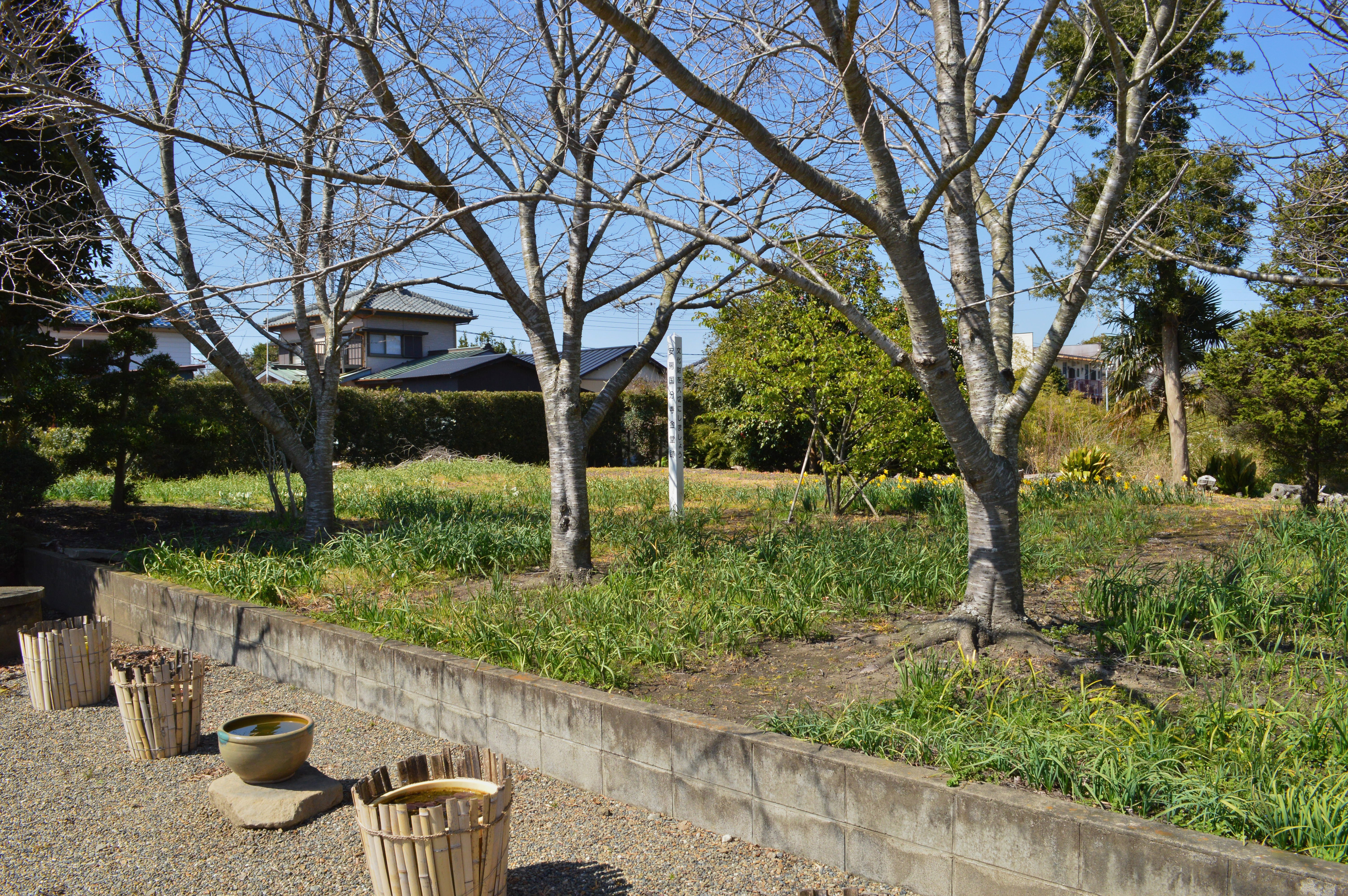
Site of Nara period Kondo

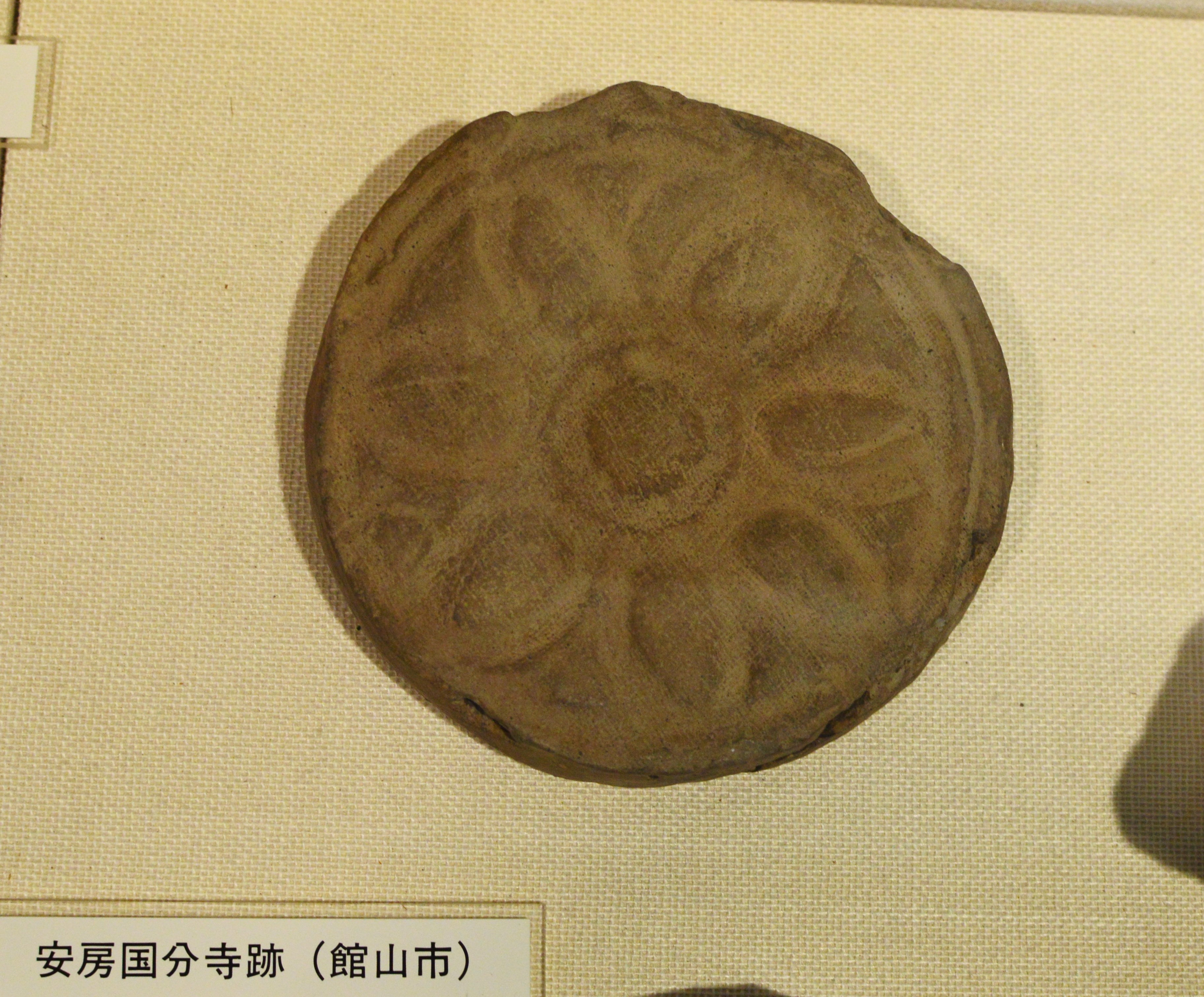
Nara period roof tile

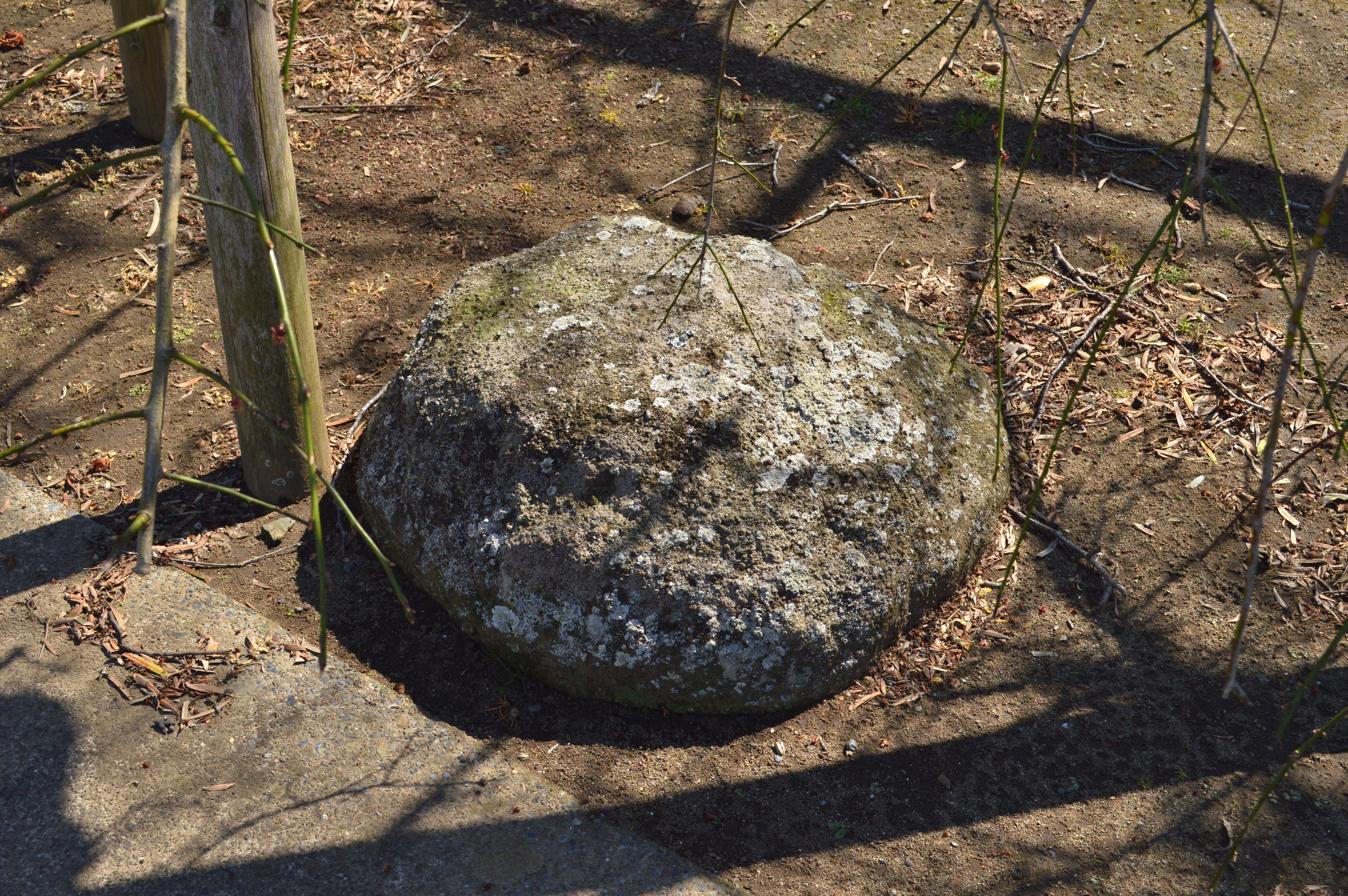
Nara period foundation stone

== See also ==
- List of Historic Sites of Japan (Chiba)
- provincial temple
