= Atamadai Shell Mound =

Jōmon period shell midden in Katori, Japan

- 阿玉台貝塚 (Japanese)
- Atamadai Shell Mound Atamadai Shell Mound (Japan)
- 35°49′02″N 140°37′40″E
- Type: shell midden
- Periods: Jōmon period
- Location: Katori, Chiba, Japan
- Region: Kantō region

Site notes
- Public access: Yes (no public facilities)

The Atamadai Shell Midden (阿玉台貝塚, Atamadai kaizuka) is an archaeological site in the Atamadai neighborhood of the city of Katori, Chiba Prefecture, in the Kantō region of Japan containing a Jōmon period shell midden. It was designated a National Historic Site of Japan in 1968 .

== Overview ==
During the early to middle Jōmon period (approximately 4000 to 2500 BC), sea levels were five to six meters higher than at present, and the ambient temperature was also 2 deg C higher. During this period, the Kantō region was inhabited by the Jōmon people, many of whom lived in coastal settlements. The middens associated with such settlements contain bone, botanical material, mollusc shells, sherds, lithics, and other artifacts and ecofacts associated with the now-vanished inhabitants, and these features, provide a useful source into the diets and habits of Jōmon society. Most of these middens are found along the Pacific coast of Japan.

The Atamadai midden is located on a gentle slope of the alluvial area of the Kurobe River, a tributary of the Tone River. The midden has a shell layer around 30 to 40 meters thick at an elevation of approximately 50 meters above the present sea level, and is distributed in the form of a shell ring over a 5,000 square meter area. It was discovered by a team from Tokyo Imperial University in 1894 and has been excavated several times. Jōmon pottery with a unique decoration pattern on the rim of the mouth, a large square handle, and with phlogopite in the clay of the body was discovered, and has been named Atamadai earthenware (阿玉台式土器, Atamadai-shiki doki), making this location a type site for this type of earthenware. Atamadai earthenware has a distribution around Lake Kasumigaura and into sites in Fukushima Prefecture to the north, and is sporadically found sites in the Chūbu region. In addition to earthenware shards, the midden was found to contain many stone tools, and shell bracelets, along with the shells of various clams (Veined rapa whelk, hamaguri, asari) and bones of birds, mammals, and saltwater fish such as sea bass and red sea bream. This verifies that sea levels in this area were higher in the mid-Jōmon period. The site dates to approximately 5500 to 4700 years ago.

The site is located a 40-minute walk from the Chabatake stop on the Chiba Kotsu Bus from Omigawa Station on the JR East Narita Line. The site was backfilled after excavation and is now a city park planted with thousands of Japanese flowering plum trees.

== See also ==
- List of Historic Sites of Japan (Chiba)
