= Nagara Cave Tomb Cluster =

Tomb cluster in Japan

Nagara Cave Tomb cluster
- 長柄横穴群 (Japanese)
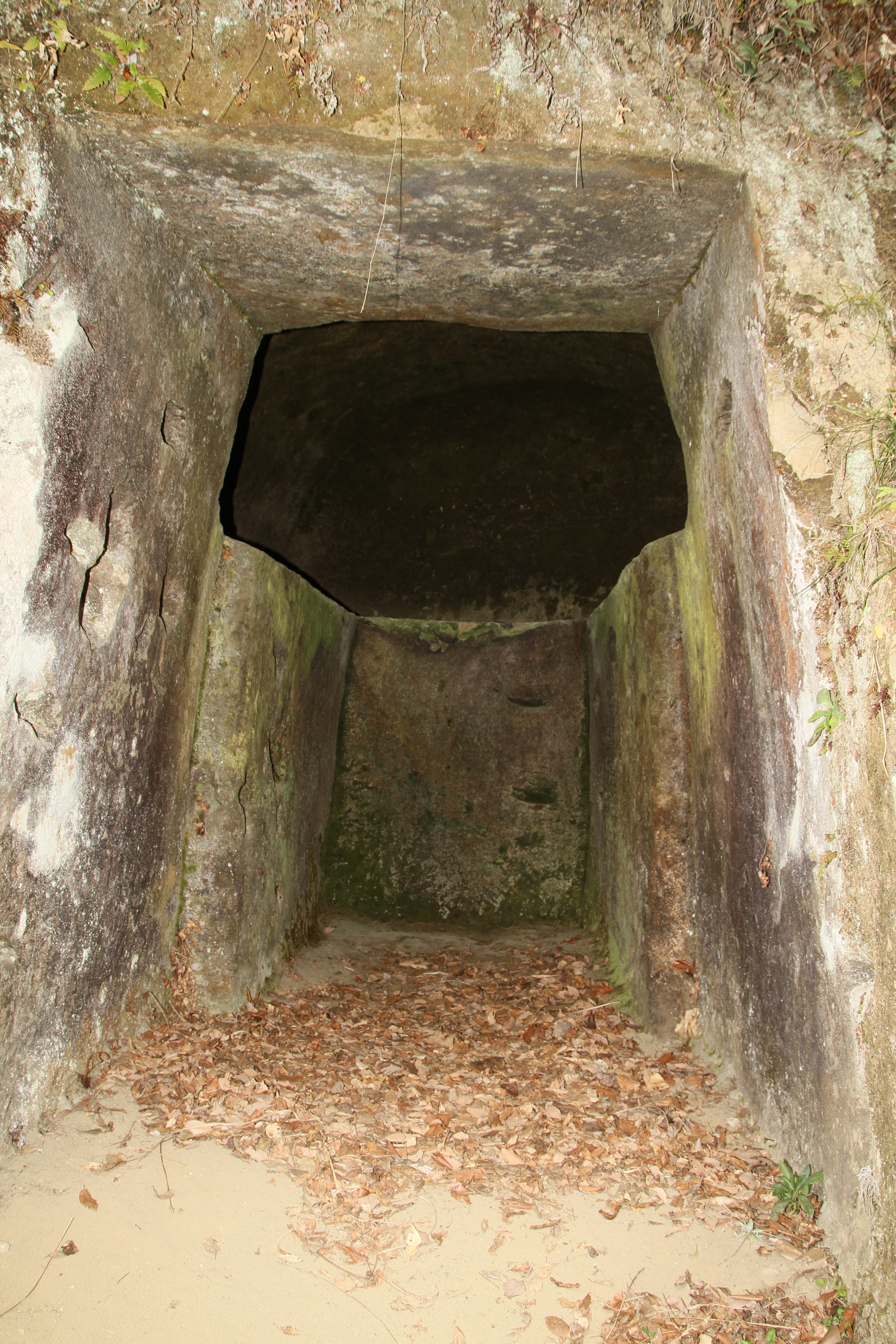
- Nagara Cave Tomb No.8

- Nagara Cave Tomb cluster Nagara Cave Tomb Cluster (Japan)
- 35°25′58″N 140°14′24″E
- Type: Yokoanabo
- Periods: Kofun period
- Location: Nagara, Chiba, Japan
- Region: Kantō region

History
- Built: 7th century AD

Site notes
- Elevation: 30 m (98 ft)
- Public access: No

The Nagara Cave Tomb cluster (長柄横穴群, Nagara yokoana-gun) is an archaeological site containing a group of yokoanabo tombs located in the Tokumasu neighborhood of the town of Nagara in Chiba Prefecture in the Kantō region of Japan. These tombs have been protected as a National Historic Site since 1995.

== Overview ==
Yokoanabo appeared in the Bōsō region from the latter half of the 6th century AD and about 4000 examples have been found in Chiba Prefecture. The group at Nagara was made in the mid-7th and early 8th century AD, and consists of 324 tombs in 25 groups, distributed in the southern part of Nagara town. The yokoanabo of this area have a unique style called kōdanshiki (高壇式) in which the burial chamber is a smaller room located at the rear of an entrance room and elevated slightly above it. The largest tomb has difference in height between these rooms of 2.9 meters. The entrance rooms can roughly be divided into what is called an "arch type", in which the cross section of the ceiling shows a semi-cylindrical shape, and what is called a "house type" in which the ceiling and walls mimic the roof and walls of a house. In addition, there are a few which are "dome type" with a domed ceiling. Some of the tombs have a casket platform, on which the wooden sarcophagus once rested.

One of the tombs, designated No.13, has a line engraving on its back wall depicting people, birds, houses, boats, and what appears to be a five-story Japanese pagoda.

The tombs have been opened since antiquity, and few grave goods have been recovered, other than fragments of Sue ware and Haji ware pottery and fragments of iron tools or weapons.

The site is a 15-minute walk from the Tokumasu bus stop on the Kominato Bus from Mobara Station on the JR East Sotobo Line.

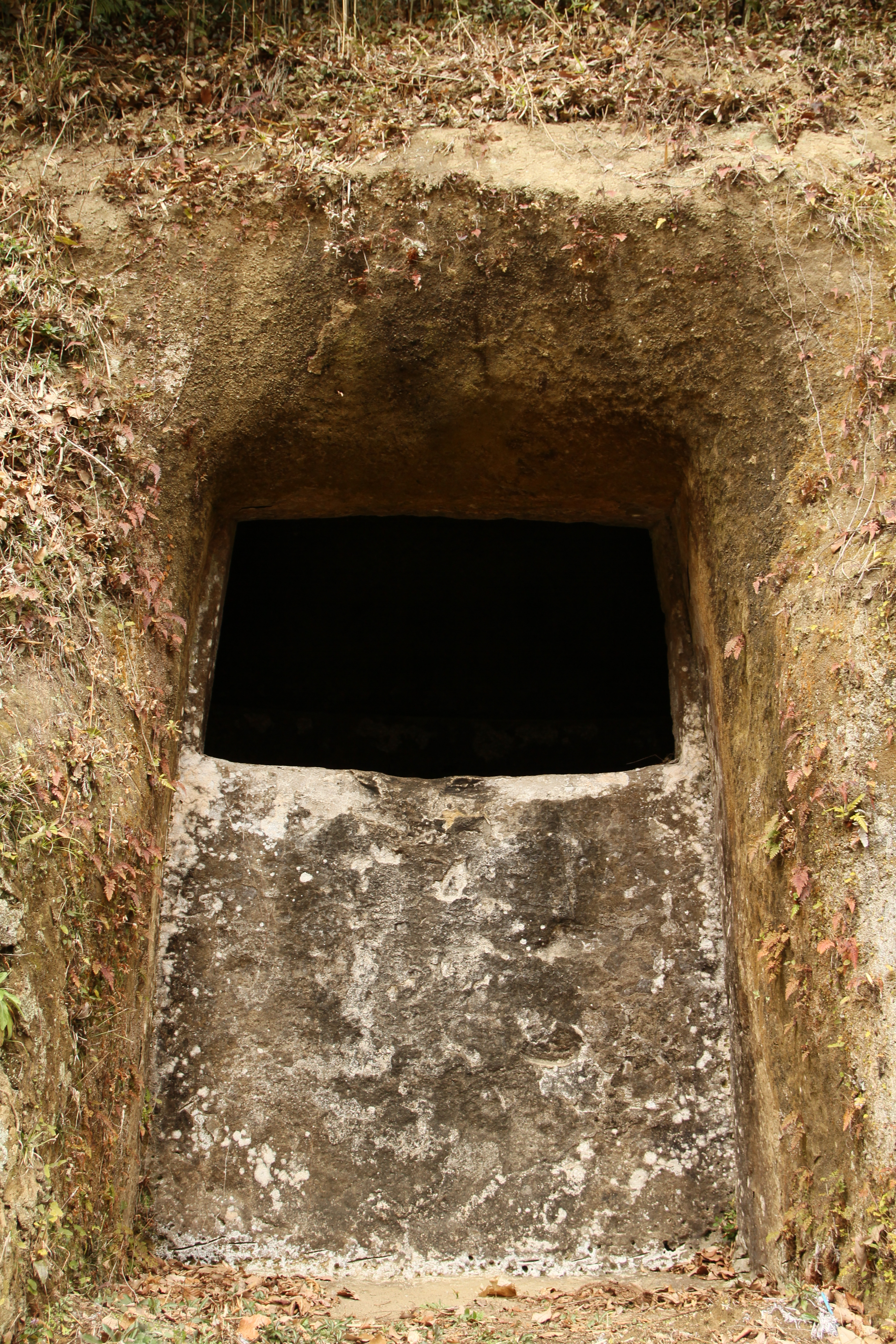
Nagara Tomb No.2

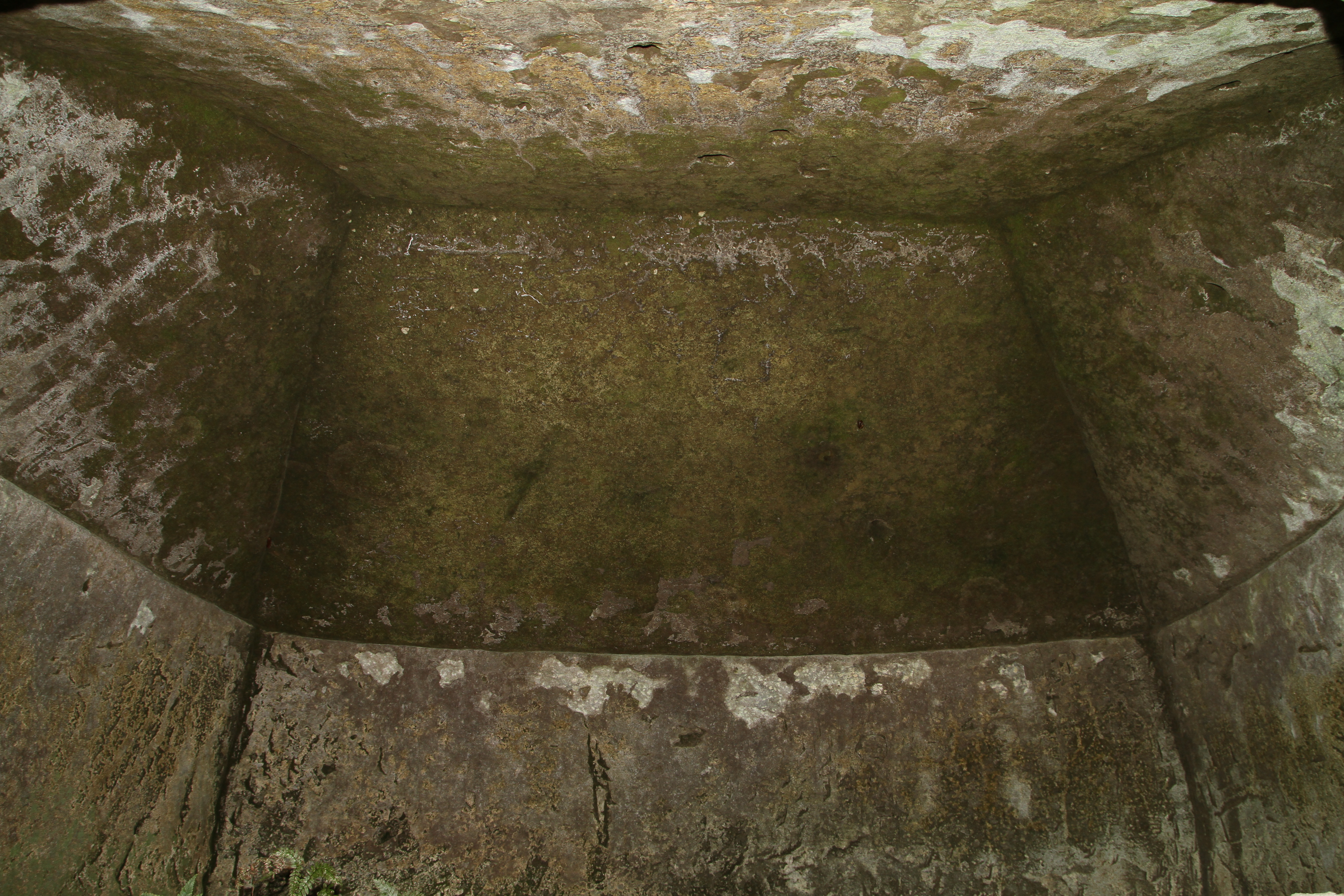
Nagara Tomb No.2

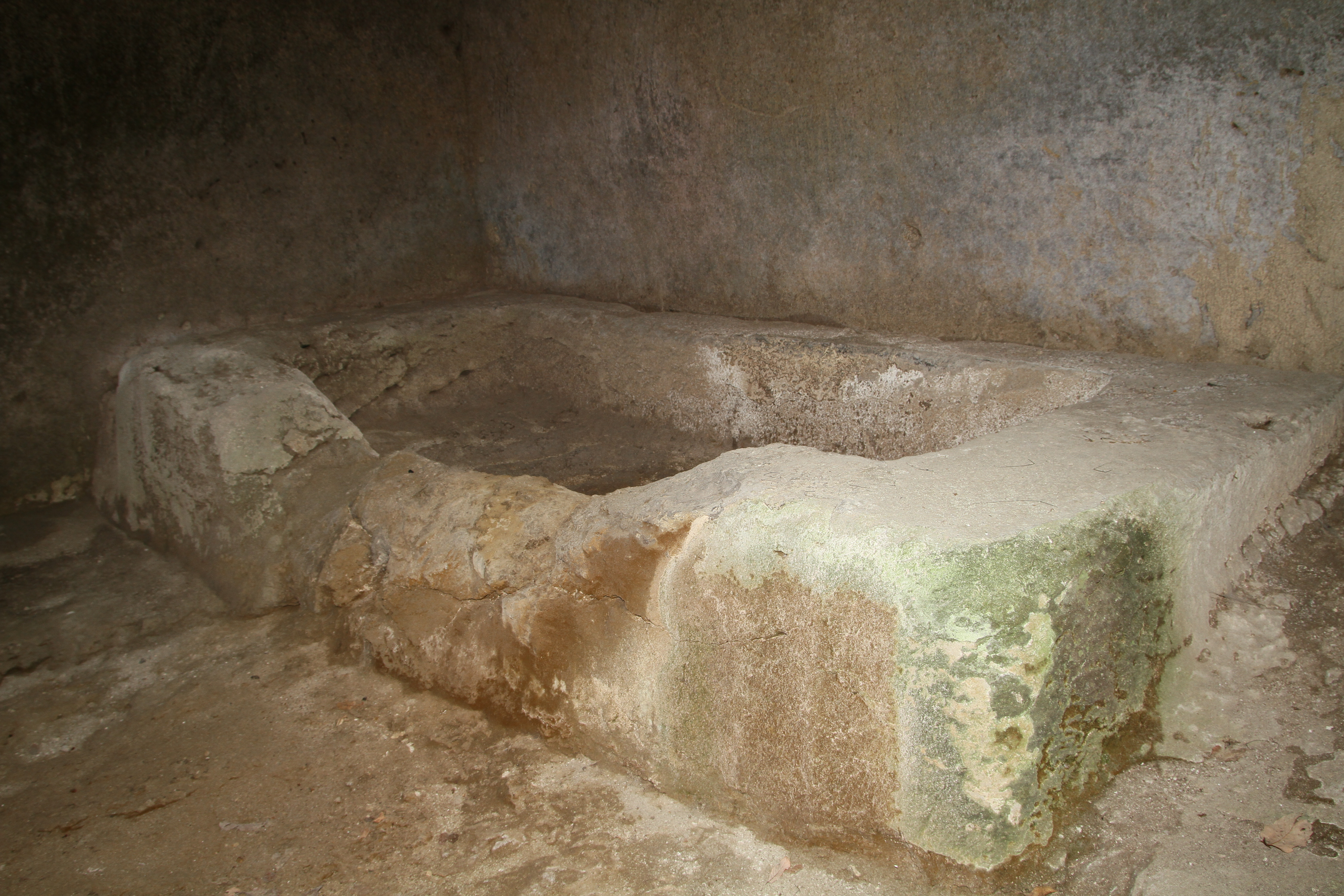
Nagara Tomb No.11

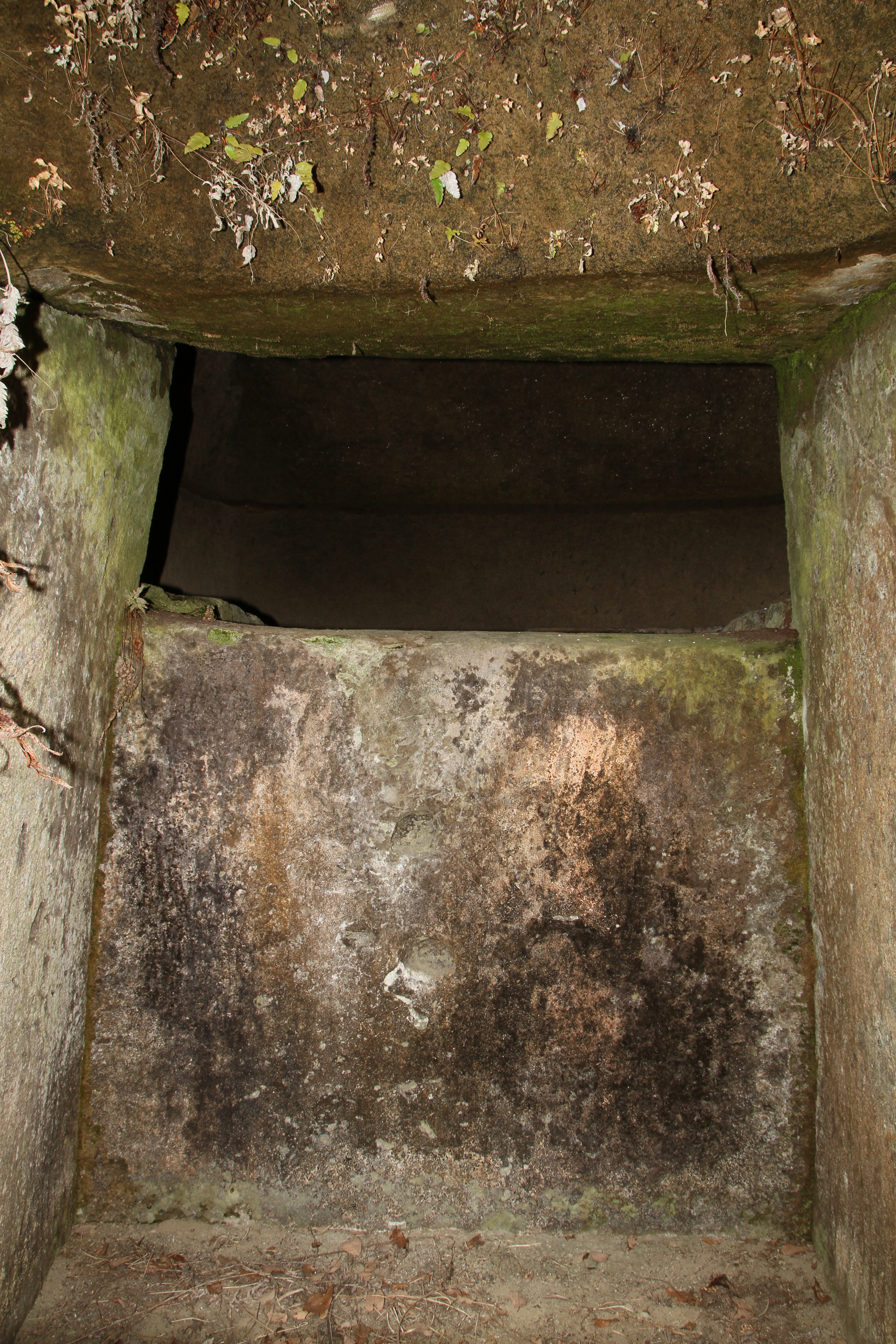
Nagara Tomb No.16

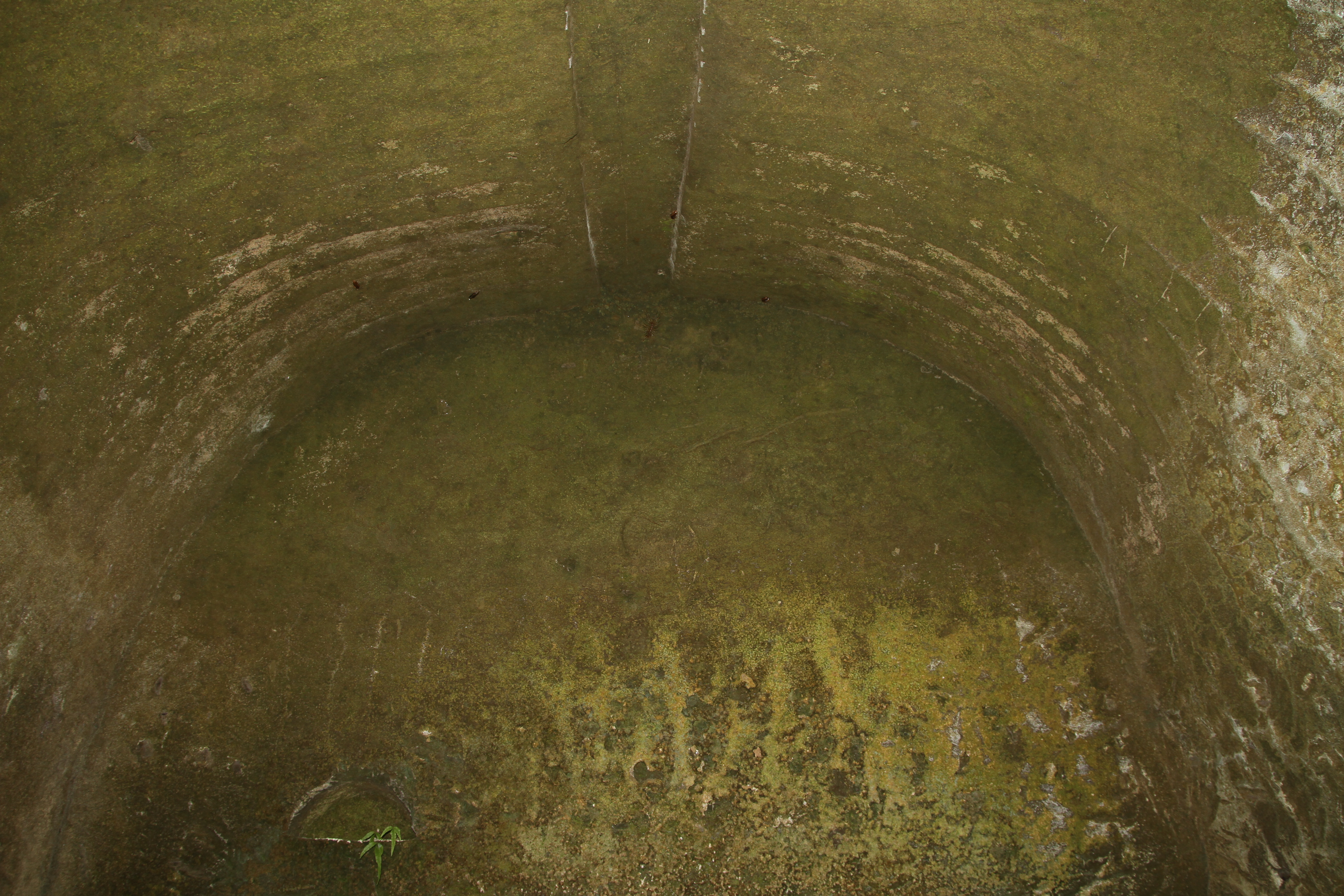
NagaraTomb No.19

== See also ==
- List of Historic Sites of Japan (Chiba)
