= Sumi Furasawa Site =

Archaeological site in Kanto, Japan

Sumi Furusawa ruins
- 墨古沢遺跡 (Japanese)
- Sumi Furusawa ruins Sumi Furasawa Site (Japan)
- 35°42′32″N 140°17′10″E
- Type: settlement
- Periods: Japanese Paleolithic
- Location: Shisui, Chiba, Japan
- Region: Kantō region

History
- Built: 34,000 BCE

Site notes
- Public access: No

The Sumi Furusawa site (墨古沢遺跡, すみ ふるさわ いせき, Sumi Furusawa iseki) is an archaeological site with the traces of a Japanese Paleolithic period settlement located in what is now the Sumi neighborhood of the town of Shisui, Chiba in the Kantō region of Japan. The site was designated a National Historic Site in 2019.

== Overview ==
Sumi Furusawa site dates from the Upper Paleolithic period, the earliest period of human habitation in the Japanese archipelago, or approximately 34,000 BC. At that time, Japan was still connected to mainland Asia by land bridges. During this era, large mammals such as the now extinct Naumann elephant migrated into the Japanese islands, along with brown bears, giant deer, tigers, wolves and monkeys, several ice ages occurred, and intense and widespread volcanic activity produced thick layers of fertile soil in many locations. Temperatures were about 9 deg C below present averages, creating subarctic conditions, even in the vicinity of what would later become Tokyo Bay.

The site was discovered during construction on an expansion to the Shisui Parking Area on the Higashi-Kantō Expressway, and was excavated from 1999 to 2000. The ruins consist of a ring-shape block of stones, indicating the location of a substantial settlement covering an area of 70 meters north-to-south by 60 meters east-to-west. This is the largest known Paleolithic period ring settlement yet found in Japan. Concentrations of charcoal and burned material are distributed around the blocks, indicating traces of bonfires. Radiocarbon dating confirmed a date of approximately 32,000 BCE. Within then settlement area was a large number of trapezoidal, knife-shaped, chisel-shaped, and wedge-shaped stone tools, polished stone axes, scrapers, lithic cores and lithic flakes. This indicates that this settlement was a production center for stone tools. Over 70 percent of the material used was a glassy black andesite which originated in Gunma Prefecture. In addition, there was obsidian which originated in what is now Nagano Prefecture or from Kōzushima, one of the Izu islands, as well as other stones typically found in variously locations in the northern Kantō region. This indicates some form of long-distance trade and a maritime capability for the inhabitants of the Japanese archipelago even at that early time in prehistory. In order to preserve the site, most of the 4386 artifacts discovered with recorded and photographed, but were left in situ and the site was backfilled after completion of the investigation.

This is the third Paleolithic historic site in the Kantō region, and the most ancient among all national historic sites in Japan. Some of the stone tools excavated are on permanent display at the Shisui Community Plaza.

== See also ==
- List of Historic Sites of Japan (Chiba)
