= List of historic sites of Japan (Chiba) =

This list is of the historic sites of Japan located within the Prefecture of Chiba.

== National Historic Sites ==
As of 1 July 2021, thirty-one Sites have been designated as being of national significance (including one *Special Historic Site).

Site	Municipality	Comments	Image	Coordinates	Type	Ref.
*Kasori Shell Mound 加曽利貝塚 Kasori kaizuka	Chiba	Jōmon period shell midden and settlement trace	Kasori Shell Mound	35°37′24″N 140°09′53″E	1	00003988
Atamadai Shell Mound 阿玉台貝塚 Atamadai kaizuka	Katori	Jōmon period shell midden and settlement trace		35°49′02″N 140°37′40″E	1	652
Arayashiki Shell Mound 荒屋敷貝塚 Arayashiki kaizuka	Chiba	Jōmon period shell midden and settlement trace	Arayashiki Shell Mound	35°37′18″N 140°08′44″E	1	657
Inō Tadataka residence 伊能忠敬旧宅 Inō Tadataka kyū-taku	Katori	Edo period cartographer	Inō Tadataka Former Residence	35°53′17″N 140°29′53″E	8	640
Inonagawari Site 井野長割遺跡 Inonagawari iseki	Sakura	Jōmon period settlement trace	Inonagawari Site	35°43′46″N 140°08′52″E	1	3416
Ubayama Shell Mound 姥山貝塚 Ubayama kaizuka	Ichikawa	Jōmon period shell midden and settlement trace	Ubayama Shell Mound	35°44′15″N 139°57′55″E	1	649
Ōhara Yūgaku former residence 大原幽学遺跡 Ōhara Yūgaku iseki	Asahi	Edo period agronomist and political philosopher	Ōhara Yūgaku former residence	35°46′50″N 140°37′16″E	6, 7, 8	645
Kazusa Kokubun-ji ruins 上総国分寺跡 Kazusa Kokubunji ato	Ichihara	Nara period provincial temple of Kazusa Province	Kazusa Kokubunji ruins	35°29′47″N 140°06′41″E	3	650
Kazusa Kokubunni-ji ruins 上総国分尼寺跡 Kazusa Kokubunniji ato	Ichihara	Nara period provincial nunnery of Kazusa Province	Kazusa Kokubunniji ruins	35°30′01″N 140°07′05″E	3	660
Kotehashi Shell Mound 犢橋貝塚 Kotehashi kaizuka	Chiba	Jōmon period shell midden and settlement trace	Kotehashi Shell Mound	35°39′50″N 140°05′47″E	1	659
Satomi clan castle ruins 里見氏城跡 Satomi-shi shiro ato	Tateyama, Minamibōsō	Muromachi period ruins of Inamura Castle (稲村城跡) and Okamoto Castle (岡本城跡)		34°59′15″N 139°54′34″E	2	00003745
Sanya Shell Mound 山野貝塚 Sanya kaizuka	Sodegaura	Jōmon period shell midden and settlement trace		35°25′48″N 139°57′17″E	1	00003992
Shibayama Kofun Cluster 芝山古墳群 Shibayama kofun-gun	Yokoshibahikari	Kofun period tumuli	Shibayama Kofun Cluster	35°40′51″N 140°25′04″E	1	647
Shimōsa Kogane Nakano Pasture Site 下総小金中野牧跡 Shimōsa Kogane Nakano maki ato	Kamagaya	Edo period horse ranch for the Tokugawa shogunate		35°46′32″N 139°59′35″E	6	00003513
Shimōsa Kokubunni-ji ruins 下総国分尼寺跡 Shimofusa Kokubunniji	Ichikawa	Nara period provincial nunnery of Shimōsa Province	Shimōsa Kokubunniji Site	35°44′48″N 139°54′47″E	3	651
Shimōsa Sakura Aburada Pasture Site 下総佐倉油田牧跡 Shimōsa Sakura Aburada maki ato	Katori	Edo period horse ranch for the Tokugawa shogunate	Shimōsa Sakura Aburada Pasture Site	35°50′20″N 140°29′31″E	6	00004081
Shimōsa Kokubun-ji ruins 下総国分寺跡 附 北下瓦窯跡 Shimofusa Kokubunji ato tsuketari kitashita kawara kama ato	Ichikawa	provincial temple of Shimōsa Province; designation includes the tile kiln site	Shimōsa Kokubunji Site	35°44′39″N 139°55′09″E	3	650
Sumi Furasawa Site 墨古沢遺跡 Sumi Furasawa iseki	Shisui	Japanese Paleolithic period settlement trace		35°42′32″N 140°17′10″E	1	00004082
Soya Shell Mound 曽谷貝塚 Soya kaizuka	Ichikawa	Jōmon period shell midden and settlement trace		35°44′50″N 139°56′06″E	1	658
Dairizuka Kofun 内裏塚古墳 Dairizuka kofun	Futtsu	Kofun period tumulus	Dairizuka Kofun	35°19′32″N 139°51′25″E	1	3336
Tsukinoki Shell Mound 月ノ木貝塚 Tsukinoki kaizuka	Chiba	Jōmon period shell midden and settlement trace		35°35′43″N 140°09′28″E	1	656
Nagara Cave Tomb Cluster 長柄横穴群 Nagara yokoana-gun	Nagara	Kofun period cave necropolis	Nagara Cave Tomb Cluster	35°25′58″N 140°14′24″E	1	661
Hanawa Shell Mound 花輪貝塚 Hanawa kaizuka	Chiba	Jōmon period shell midden and settlement trace		35°36′54″N 140°09′39″E	1	00003500
Bentenyama Kofun 弁天山古墳 Bentenyama kofun	Futtsu	Kofun period tumulus		35°16′54″N 139°51′30″E	1	637
Horinouchi Shell Mound 堀之内貝塚 Horinouchi kaizuka	Ichikawa	Jōmon period shell midden and settlement trace	Horinouchi Shell Mound	35°45′33″N 139°54′38″E	1	648
Motosakura Castle ruins 本佐倉城跡 Motosakura-jō ato	Sakura, Shisui	Sengoku to early Edo period castle ruins	Motosakura Castle Site	35°43′43″N 140°15′32″E	2	3237
Yamazaki Shell Mound 山崎貝塚 Yamazaki kaizuka	Noda	Jōmon period shell midden and settlement trace	Yamazaki Shell Mound	35°55′18″N 139°53′39″E	1	655
Yoshibumi Shell Mound 良文貝塚 Yoshibumi kaizuka	Katori	Jōmon period shell midden and settlement trace	Yoshibumi Shell Mound	35°48′57″N 140°38′29″E	1	658
Ryūkaku-ji Precinct Pagoda Foundations 龍角寺境内ノ塔阯 Ryūkakuji keidai no tō-shi	Sakae	Nara period temple ruins	Ryūkakuji Precinct Pagoda Foundations	35°50′01″N 140°16′11″E	3	642
Ryūgakuji Kofun Cluster - Iwaya Kofun 龍角寺古墳群・岩屋古墳 Ryūgakuji kofun-gun・Iwaya kofun	Sakae, Narita	Kofun period tumuli	Ryūgakuji Kofun Cluster - Iwaya Kofun	35°49′16″N 140°16′38″E	1	643
Torikakenishi Shell Mound 取掛西貝塚; Torikakenishi kaizuka	Funabashi			35°42′56″N 140°00′38″E		

== Prefectural Historic Sites ==
As of 1 May 2020, eighty Sites have been designated as being of prefectural importance.

Site	Municipality	Comments	Image	Coordinates	Type	Ref.
Graves of Totsuka-ha Yōshin-ryū Founder Totsuka Hikosuke Hidetoshi and Second Generation Totsuka Hideyoshi 戸塚派楊心流流祖戸塚彦介英俊・二代戸塚英美墓; Totsuka-ha Yōshin-ryū ryūso Totsuka Hikosuke Hidetoshi・nidai Totsuka Hideyoshi haka	Chiba			35°36′14″N 140°07′34″E		for all refs see
Hasebe Shell Mound 長谷部貝塚; Hasebe kaizuka	Chiba			35°34′08″N 140°11′34″E		
Daikakujiyama Kofun 大覚寺山古墳; Daikakujiyama kofun	Chiba			35°33′31″N 140°09′00″E		
Aoki Konyō Sweet Potato Experimentation Site 青木昆陽甘薯試作地; Aoki Konyō kansho shisaku-chi	Chiba			35°39′39″N 140°03′19″E		
Ogyūmichi Site 荻生道遺跡; Ogyūmichi iseki	Chiba			35°31′13″N 140°16′48″E		
Higashiterayama Shell Mound 東寺山貝塚; Higashiterayama kaizuka	Chiba			35°38′02″N 140°07′56″E		
Futagozuka Kofun 二子塚古墳; Futagozuka kofun	Ichihara			35°28′50″N 140°03′08″E		
Anesaki Tenjinyama Kofun 姉崎天神山古墳; Anesaki Tenjinyama kofun	Ichihara			35°28′28″N 140°03′15″E		
Gōdo No.5 Tumulus 神門5号墳; Gōdo go-gō fun	Ichihara			35°29′39″N 140°06′37″E		
Shiizu Castle Site 椎津城跡; Shiizu-jō ato	Ichihara			35°28′19″N 140°02′09″E		
Emperor Meiji Funabashi Visit Site 明治天皇船橋行在所; Meiji Tennō Funabashi anzaisho	Funabashi			35°41′51″N 139°59′15″E		
Suwada Site 須和田遺跡; Suwada iseki	Ichikawa			35°44′20″N 139°54′45″E		
Fujisaki Horigome Shell Mound 藤崎堀込貝塚; Fujisaki Horigome kaizuka	Narashino			35°41′23″N 140°02′07″E		
Noda Shell Mound 野田貝塚; Noda kaizuka	Noda			35°57′30″N 139°51′17″E		
Suijinyama Kofun 水神山古墳; Suijinyama kofun	Abiko			35°51′41″N 140°02′05″E		
Sōma District Storehouse Site 相馬郡衙正倉跡; Sōma gunga shōsō ato	Abiko			35°51′51″N 140°05′14″E		
Kogane Nakano Pasture Site 小金中野牧の込跡; Kogane Nakano maki no kome ato	Kamagaya			35°46′33″N 139°59′37″E		
Fujigaya No.13 Tumulus 藤ケ谷十三塚; Fujigaya jūsan-zuka	Kashiwa			35°48′58″N 140°01′26″E		
Kitanosaku No.1 & No.2 Tumulus 北ノ作1・2号墳; Kitanosaku ichi-・ni-gō fun	Kashiwa			35°50′42″N 140°03′49″E		
Nagakuma Haiji Site 長熊廃寺跡; Nagakuma Haiji ato	Sakura			35°42′53″N 140°15′18″E		
Former Sakura Juntendō 旧佐倉順天堂 kyū-Sakura Juntendō	Sakura			35°43′07″N 140°14′34″E		
Graves of Hotta Masatoshi, Masayoshi, and Masatoma 堀田正俊・正睦・正倫墓; Hotta Masatoshi・Masayoshi・Masatoma haka	Sakura	at Jindai-ji		35°43′15″N 140°14′00″E		
Iigōsaku Site 飯郷作遺跡; Iigōsaku iseki	Sakura			35°43′06″N 140°10′13″E		
Jōza Shell Mound 上座貝塚; Jōza kaizuka	Sakura			35°43′19″N 140°09′32″E		
Graves of Ono-ha Ittō-ryū Founder Ono Jirōemon Tadaaki and Second Generation Ono Jirōemon Tadatsune 小野派一刀流流祖小野次郎右衛門忠明・二代小野次郎右衛門忠常墓; Ono-ha Ittō-ryū ryūso Ono Jirōemon Tadaaki・nidai Ono Jirōemon Tadatsune haka	Narita			35°47′08″N 140°19′29″E		
Yatsushiro Bead Production Site 八代玉作遺跡; Yatsushiro tama-tsukuri iseki	Narita			35°47′37″N 140°17′07″E		
Kōzuhara Kofun Cluster 公津原古墳群; Kōzuhara kofun-gun	Narita			35°46′47″N 140°17′26″E		
Tomisato Sheep Pasture Site 富里牧羊場跡; Tomisato bokuyōjō ato	Tomisato			35°42′59″N 140°21′56″E		
Minami-Ōtamebukuro Site 南大溜袋遺跡; Minami-Ōtamebukuro iseki	Tomisato			35°43′55″N 140°18′18″E		
Kiyodo Spring 清戸の泉附版木（文政十一年九月在銘） Kiyodo no izumi tsuketari hangi	Shiroi	designation includes inscribed woodblocks from the ninth month of Bunsei 11 (1828)		35°48′02″N 140°05′25″E		
Grave of Tenshin Shōden Shintō-ryū Founder Iizasa Chōisai 天真正伝神道流始祖飯篠長威斎墓; Tenshin shōden Shintō-ryū shiso Iizasa Chōisai haka	Katori			35°53′05″N 140°31′36″E		
Kubokichikusō Site 久保木竹窓遺跡; Kubokichikusō iseki	Katori			35°54′03″N 140°31′37″E		
Shimoono Shell Mound 下小野貝塚; Shimoono kaizuka	Katori			35°51′28″N 140°31′26″E		
Nishinojō Shell Mound 西の城貝塚; Nishinojō kaizuka	Kōzaki			35°53′39″N 140°23′57″E		
Birthplace of Satō Takanaka 佐藤尚中誕生地; Satō Takanaka tanjō-chi	Katori			35°51′24″N 140°36′22″E		
Grave of Matsumoto Kōshirō I 初代松本幸四郎墓; Shodai Matsumoto Kōshirō haka	Katori	at Zenkō-ji (善光寺)		35°51′25″N 140°36′17″E		
Gozenkizuka Kofun 御前鬼塚古墳; Gozenkizuka kofun	Asahi			35°45′51″N 140°35′44″E		
Grave of Tetsugyū Oshō 鉄牛和尚墓; Tetsugyū Oshō haka	Tōnoshō	at Fukuju-ji (福聚寺)		35°47′05″N 140°40′32″E		
Hōjōzuka Kofun 北条塚古墳; Hōjōzuka kofun	Tako			35°46′19″N 140°31′54″E		
Shakushizuka Kofun しゃくし塚古墳; Shakushizuka kofun	Tako			35°46′58″N 140°30′32″E		
Iidaka Danrin Site 飯高檀林跡; Iidaka Danrin ato	Sōsa	designation includes the Kyōzō, Daimokudō, and Kuri		35°44′40″N 140°31′45″E		
Miyazaku Prefectural Office Site 宮谷県庁跡; Miyazaku kenchō ato	Ōamishirasato			35°32′04″N 140°19′04″E		
Birthplace of Inō Tadataka 伊能忠敬出生地; Inō Tadataka shusshō-chi	Kujūkuri			35°33′05″N 140°26′01″E		
Aoki Konyō Fudōdō Sweet Potato Experimentation Site 青木昆陽不動堂甘薯試作地; Aoki Konyō Fudōdō kansho shisaku-chi	Kujūkuri			35°31′07″N 140°25′11″E		
House where Poet Itō Sachio was Born 歌人伊藤左千夫の生家; Kajin Itō Sachio no seika	Sanmu			35°36′07″N 140°25′06″E		
Grave of Inaba Mokusai 稲葉黙斎墓; Inaba Mokusai no haka	Sanmu	at Ganshō-ji (元倡寺)		35°36′06″N 140°24′08″E		
Ōzutsumi Gongenzuka Kofun 大堤権現塚古墳; Ōzutsumi Gongenzuka kofun	Sanmu			35°38′03″N 140°26′56″E		
Yamamuro Himezuka Kofun 山室姫塚古墳; Yamamuro Himezuka kofun	Sanmu			35°39′44″N 140°25′17″E		
Birthplace of Kaiho Gyoson 海保漁村先生誕生之處; Kaiho Gyoson sensei tanjō no tokoro	Yokoshibahikari			35°37′12″N 140°30′38″E		
Ogyū Sorai Study Site 荻生徂徠勉学の地; Ogyū Sorai bengaku no chi	Mobara			35°28′49″N 140°18′08″E		
Miyanodai Site 宮ノ台遺跡; Miyanodai iseki	Mobara			35°24′49″N 140°16′39″E		
Grave of Shirai Chōsui 白井鳥酔ノ墓; Shirai Chōsui no haka	Chōnan	at Shōzen-ji (正善寺)		35°21′56″N 140°16′18″E		
Nōmanji Kofun 能満寺古墳; Nōmanji kofun	Chōnan			35°21′43″N 140°18′16″E		
Aburaden Kofun Cluster 油殿古墳群; Aburaden kofun-gun	Chōnan			35°22′28″N 140°17′35″E		
Kangunzuka 官軍塚; Kangunzuka	Katsuura			35°08′34″N 140°19′25″E		
Kazusa Ōtaki Castle Honmaru Site 上総大多喜城本丸跡附大井戸・薬医門; Kazusa Ōtaki-jō honmaru ato	Ōtaki	designation includes the large well and Yakuimon		35°17′09″N 140°14′22″E		
Musō Kokushi Zazen Cave 夢窓国師坐禅窟; Musō Kokushi zazen-kutsu	Isumi			35°19′07″N 140°18′42″E		
Don Rodrigo Landing Site ドン・ロドリゴ上陸地; Don Rodorigo jōriku-chi	Onjuku			35°11′03″N 140°22′38″E		
Awa Jinja Cave Site 安房神社洞窟遺跡; Awa Jinja dōkutsu iseki	Tateyama			34°55′22″N 139°50′14″E		
Natagiri Cave 鉈切洞穴; Natagiri dōketsu	Tateyama			34°58′21″N 139°48′07″E		
Awa Kokubun-ji Site 安房国分寺跡; Awa Kokubunji ato	Tateyama	provincial temple of Awa Province		34°59′36″N 139°53′22″E		
Birthplace of Koizumi Chikashi 古泉千樫誕生地; Koizumi Chikashi tanjō-chi	Kamogawa			35°07′48″N 140°00′05″E		
Minamoto no Yoritomo Landing Site 源頼朝上陸地; Minamoto no Yoritomo jōriku-chi	Kyonan			35°07′05″N 139°49′43″E		
Tagodai Site 田子台遺跡; Tagodai iseki	Kyonan			35°06′27″N 139°50′44″E		
Birthplace of Hishikawa Moronobu 菱川師宣誕生地; Hishikawa Moronobu tanjō-chi	Kyonan			35°08′18″N 139°50′15″E		
Cradle of the Dairy Industry in Japan 日本酪農発祥地; Nihon rakunō hasshō-chi	Minamibōsō			35°06′17″N 139°59′21″E		
Kamo Site 加茂遺跡; Kamo iseki	Minamibōsō			35°00′57″N 139°57′07″E		
Kinreizuka Kofun 金鈴塚古墳; Kinreizuka kofun	Kisarazu			35°23′14″N 139°55′58″E		
Kujūkubō Haiji Site 九十九坊廃寺阯; Kujūkubō Haiji ato	Kimitsu			35°19′41″N 139°55′53″E		
Kanegafuchi 鐘ケ淵; Kanegafuchi	Kimitsu			35°19′36″N 139°55′51″E		
Hachiman Jinja Kofun 八幡神社古墳; Hachiman Jinja kofun	Kimitsu			35°18′52″N 139°55′36″E		
Grave of Ōmiya Jinbee 近江屋甚兵衛墓; Ōmiya Jinbee haka	Kimitsu	at Shōren-ji (青蓮寺)		35°20′09″N 139°52′04″E		
Dōsojinura Kofun 道祖神裏古墳; Dōsojinura kofun	Kimitsu			35°19′14″N 139°55′47″E		
Hakusan Jinja Kofun 白山神社古墳; Hakusan Jinja kofun	Kimitsu			35°19′13″N 140°03′28″E		
Igozuka Kofun 飯籠塚古墳; Igozuka kofun	Kimitsu			35°18′33″N 140°03′05″E		
Dairizuka Kofun 内裏塚古墳; Dairizuka kofun	Futtsu	also a national Historic Site		35°19′32″N 139°51′25″E		
Kinu Cave Tombs 絹横穴群; Kinu yokoana-gun	Futtsu			35°17′26″N 139°52′45″E		
Iino Jin'ya Moat Site 飯野陣屋濠跡; Iino jinya hori ato	Futtsu			35°19′15″N 139°51′48″E		
Grave of Orimoto Kakyō 織本花嬌の墓; Orimoto Kakyō no haka	Futtsu	at Daijō-ji (大乗寺)		35°18′56″N 139°49′30″E		
Daiman Cave Tombs 大満横穴群; Daiman yokoana-gun	Futtsu			35°13′27″N 139°52′56″E		

== Municipal Historic Sites ==
As of 1 May 2020, a further three hundred and eighty-eight Sites have been designated as being of municipal importance.

== See also ==
- Cultural Properties of Japan
- Shimōsa Province
- Kazusa Province
- Awa Province
- National Museum of Japanese History
- List of Places of Scenic Beauty of Japan (Chiba)
