= Inonagawari Site =

- 井野長割遺跡 (Japanese)
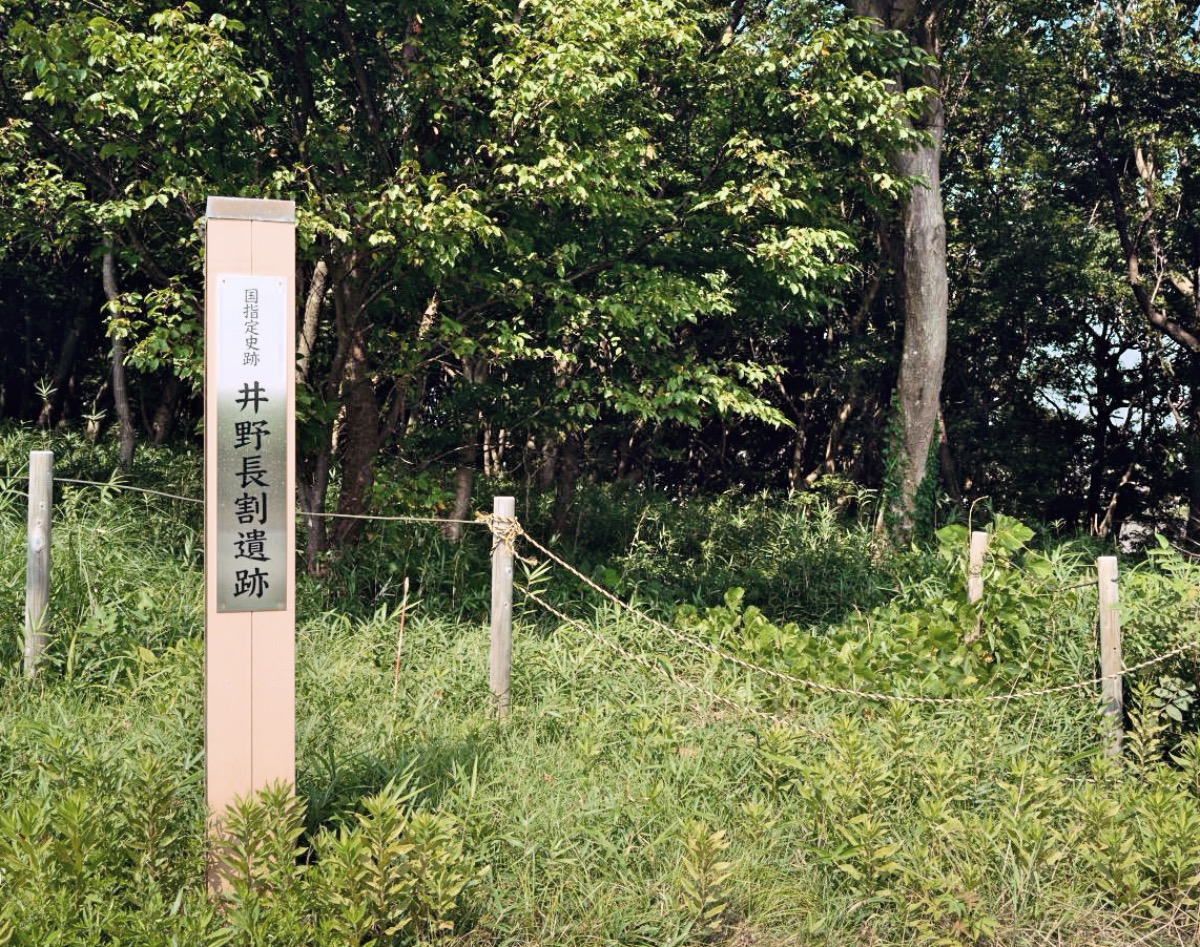
- Inonagawari Site

- Inonagawari Site Inonagawari Site (Japan)
- 36°43′46″N 140°08′52″E
- Type: settlement
- Periods: Jōmon period
- Location: Sakura, Chiba, Japan
- Region: Kantō region

Site notes
- Discovered: 1969
- Public access: Yes (no facilities)

The Inonagawari Site (井野長割遺跡, Inonagawari iseki) is an archaeological site containing the ruins of a late to final Jōmon period settlement located in what is now the Yūkarigaoka neighborhood of the city of Sakura, Chiba Prefecture in the Kantō region of Japan. The site was designated a National Historic Site of Japan in 2005.

== Overview ==
The Inonagawari site is located in the central part of northern Chiba Prefecture on a flat plateau with an elevation of about 26 meters, sandwiched between a small branch of the Ino River, 2.5 kilometers south of Inba, and the southern shore of Lake Inbanuma. Although there are no conspicuous Jōmon archaeological sites in the immediate vicinity, middens and post-Jōmon era settlements are distributed in the southern coastal area of Lake Inbanuma area at intervals of approximately 2 kilometers. The site was discovered during the construction of Ino Elementary School in 1969, and a full-scale archaeological excavation was conducted in 1973 by Keio University, confirming the existence of a mound-shaped embankment from the Jōmon period. In subsequent surveys, several more embankments and traces of large-scale valley reclamation were found, and by 2002, it was clear that the site had at least five mound-shaped embankments arranged in a rough oval in the area of approximately 160 meters north-south and 120 meters east-west. The largest surviving embankment had a length of 60 meters, width of 30 meters and height of 1.5 meters.

Although sites with a circular embankments that were constructed in the late and final Jōmon period (approximately 4,000 to 3,000 years ago), the Inonagawari Site is unique in that the embankments are connected together resembling a liked series of kofun tumuli. There were also two separate mounds within the enclosure formed by these embankments, which had the remnants of pit dwellings. In addition, Jōmon pottery and stone tools, along with many ritual objects such as clay figurines and stone poles have been excavated.

The west half of the ring embankment remains has been lost due to the construction of the school, but at least five embankment remains from the eastern perimeter and the central mound have been preserved. It is located about a 20 minute walk from Yukarigaoka Station on the Keisei Main Line.

== See also ==
- List of Historic Sites of Japan (Chiba)
