= Ōhara Yūgaku =

Japanese pedagogue (1797–1858)

- Born: April 13, 1797; Owari Province, Japan
- Died: April 21, 1858 (aged 61); Asahi, Chiba, Japan

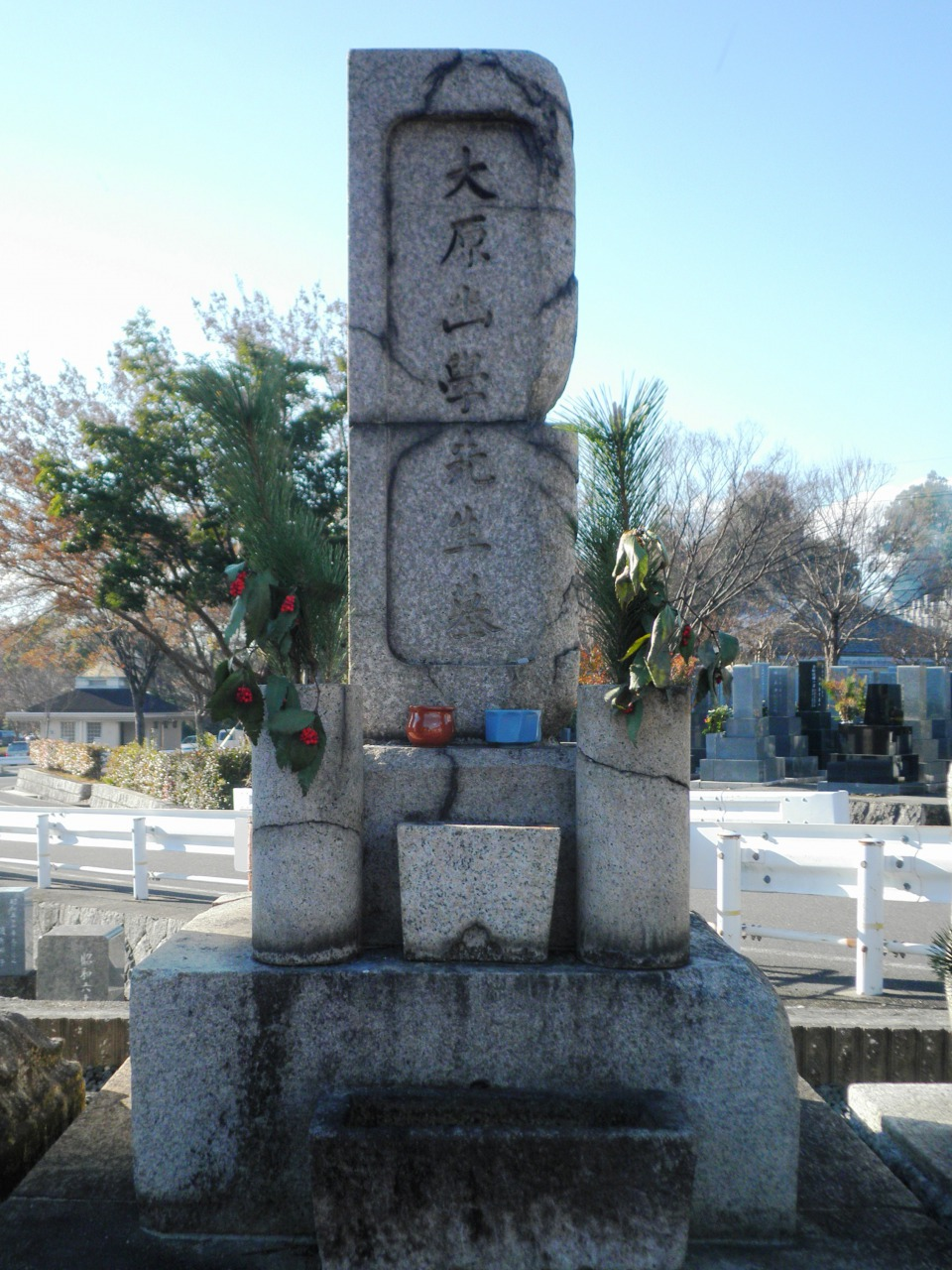
Ōhara Yūgaku's grave in Nagoya

Ōhara Yūgaku (大原幽学; April 13, 1797 – April 21, 1858) was a 19th-century Japanese agronomist, philosopher, moralist and economist. Contemporary with the more famous Ninomiya Sontoku, he combined three strands of traditional teachings — Buddhism, Shinto and Confucianism into practical ethical principles which he applied to form an agricultural cooperative in 1838.

== Biography ==
Ōhara's ancestry is unclear, but it appears that he was born as the second son of Daidoji Naokata, a samurai of Owari Domain. Disowned by his family for unknown reasons when he was 18 years old, he wandered the country as a vagrant through Mino, Yamato, Kyoto and Osaka teaching martial arts, and later fortune telling, using the I Ching or physiognomy. During this period, he formulated a new syncretic religion combining Buddhism, Shinto and Confucianism with elements of Daoism. In 1831, he settled in Shimōsa Province, where he began to attract a number of followers. One of these followers was the headman of Nagabe Village in Katori District (now part of the city of Asahi). Ōhara relocated to this village in 1835, which was located in a large area of reclaimed tidelands, and put his teachings to practical application. He reorganized the local farmers into an agricultural cooperative, undertook land reform, and introduced new agricultural technologies. He reorganized the village's rice fields, which were small and of different shapes into uniform 1000 square meter fields for better efficiency. His efforts to improve the village extended into every aspect of the lives of the inhabitants. Ōhara encouraged fiscal frugality and savings, banned gambling, established a school for all of the village children, and insisted that his teachings on morality be practiced by all the inhabitants. He constructed a large building, the "Kaishinro" for village assemblies and as a teaching center. By 1848, the village had become very prosperous and was regarded as a model village within Katori District.

However, the Tokugawa shogunate looked on these unorthodox social and economic experiments with deep suspicion, especially as it was being controlled by a self-proclaimed leader of an unauthorized new religion with uncertain antecedents. After peasant unrest in the area in 1852, Ōhara was arrested by the Kanjō bugyō. He spent the next five years attempting to clear his name, but in 1857, he was re-arrested for sedition, and incarcerated for 100 days, during which time the Shogunate ordered that his agricultural cooperative be destroyed and his teachings banned. Ōhara committed seppuku the following year.

== Ohara Yugaku Museum ==
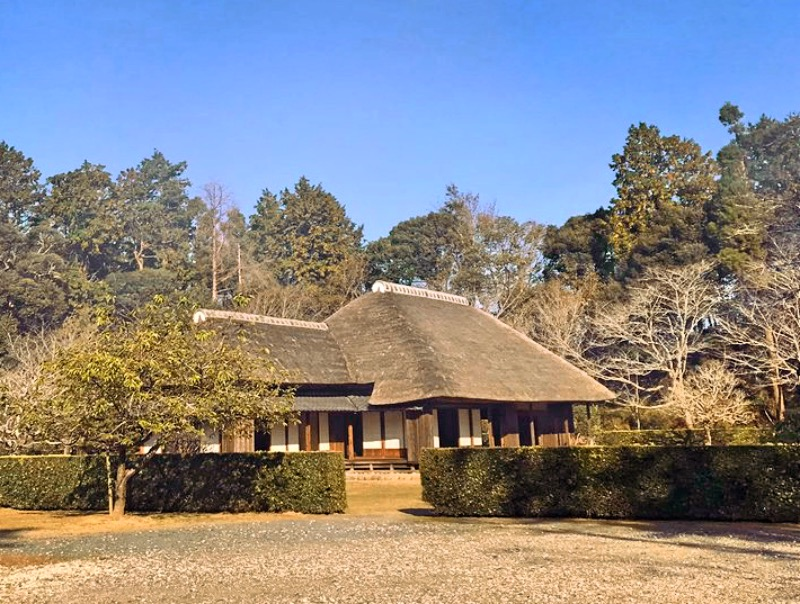
Ōhara Yūgaku former residence in Asahi, Chiba

A commemorative museum to Ōhara's life and works is located in front of the site of his house in Asahi. The house itself still exists, and along with his tomb was proclaimed a National Historic Site in 1952. The house was designed by Ōhara himself in 1842 and was a simple structure with a single eight-tatami mat room with kitchen and toilet. The "Kaishinro" teaching hall no longer exists, having been destroyed in 1852 by neighboring villagers at the instigation of the shogunate. A Shinto shrine dedicated to Ōhara now stands on its site.

== See also ==
- List of Historic Sites of Japan (Chiba)
