= Dairizuka Kofun =

Ancient burial mound in Futtsu, Kantõ, Japan

Dairizuka kofun
- 内裏塚古墳 (Japanese)
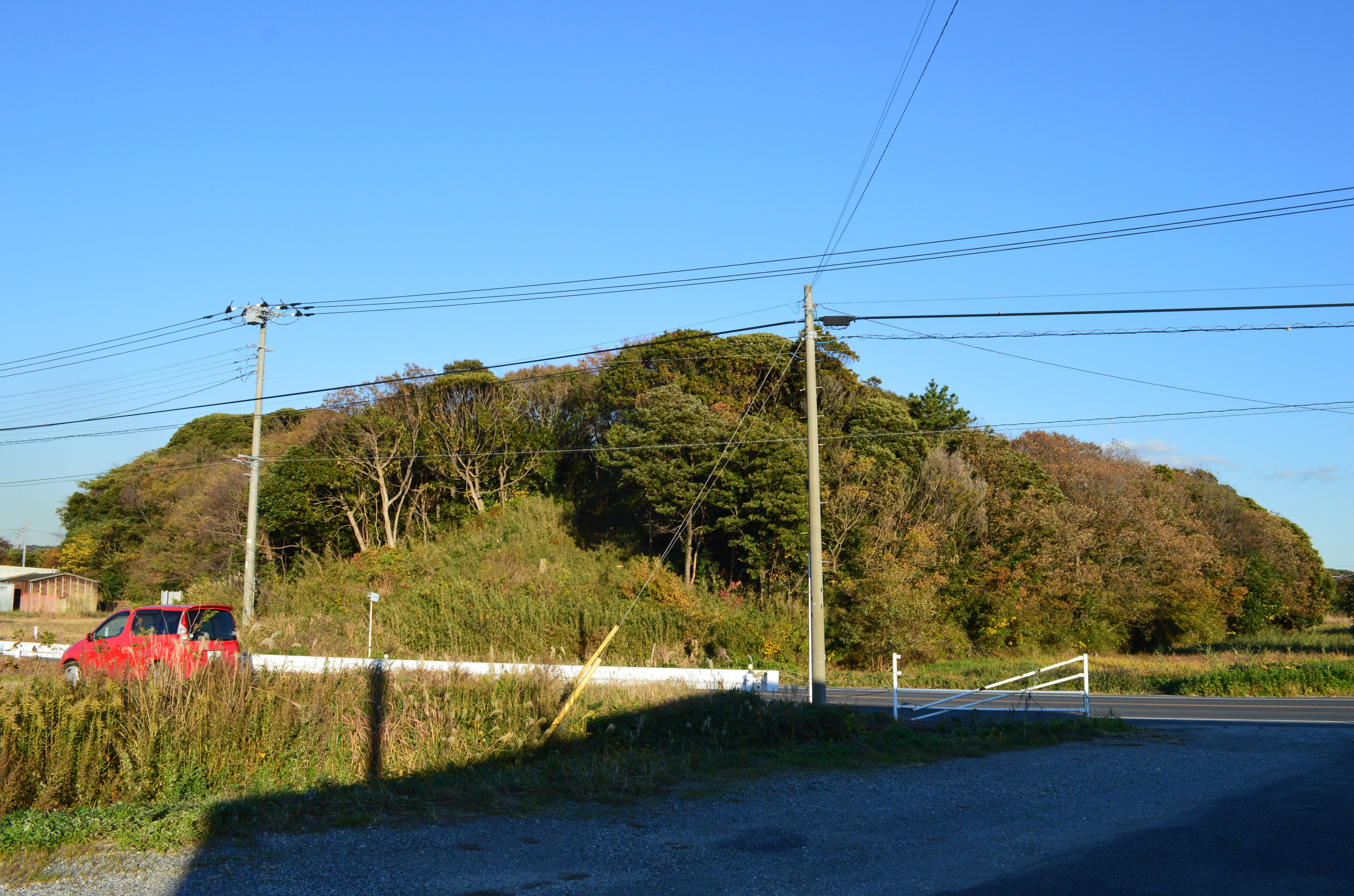
- Dairizuka kofun

- Dairizuka kofun Dairizuka Kofun (Japan)
- 35°19′32″N 139°51′25″E
- Type: kofun
- Periods: Kofun period
- Location: Futtsu, Chiba, Japan
- Region: Kantō region

Site notes
- Public access: Yes (no public facilities)

The Dairizuka kofun (内裏塚古墳) is a Kofun period burial mound located in what is now the Kashima neighborhood of the city of Futtsu, Chiba Prefecture in the Kantō region of Japan. The tumulus was designated a National Historic Site of Japan in 2002, with the area under protection extended in 2009.

== Overview ==
The Dairizuka Kofun is a zenpō-kōen-fun (前方後円墳), which is shaped like a keyhole, having one square end and one circular end, when viewed from above. It is located in an estuary lowland created by the Koito River, which flows into Tokyo Bay, in the central part of the Bōsō Peninsula. The area along this river has a high concentration of Kofun period remains, including 47 tumuli (29 dome-shaped, seven square-shaped and 11 keyhole-shaped), which were built from the middle of the 5th century to the 7th century AD. This area was a transportation hub, controlling the route from the Bōsō Peninsula to the Miura Peninsula and from thence to the Kansai region and the Yamato court.

The Dairizuka Kofun was built in two layers with an overall length of 144 meters, and was originally surrounded by a moat. The mound was once covered in fukiishi and was surrounded by three rows cylindrical, "morning-glory"-shaped, house-shaped, and human-shaped haniwa.

The tumulus was excavated in 1906 by Tokyo Imperial University, and two stone burial chambers aligned with the main axis of the tumulus were found in the posterior circular portion the mound. The eastern chamber measured 5.75 meters long by 0.75 to 0.88 meters in width, and contained two sets of human remains, five iron swords, one iron dagger, one iron sickle, three chopsticks, an iron glove and ax. The western chamber was 7.55 meters long by one meter wide, and had a bronze mirror, five iron swords, one long iron sword, one iron spear, a set of gold-bronze metal fittings and a Kabura-ya arrowhead made of deer bone. From the grave goods it was determined that this tomb was built in the middle of the Kofun period, or early 5th century AD. The metal fittings are significant, as an identical set has been recovered from a tomb in Fukuoka Prefecture and the only other known location has been from tombs in the Mimana region of the Korean Peninsula. The Kabura-ya arrowhead, which is used to make a noise when the arrow is launched, is a unique find. These artifacts are on display at the National Museum of Japanese History in Sakura, Chiba.

The area where this kofun is located is ancient Kingdom of Sue (須恵), which was also on the route the semi-mythical Yamato Takeru took on his expedition to conquer eastern Japan for the Yamato court. Per the Kujiki chronicle, Sue was ruled by a Kuni no miyatsuko named Ōfuhiomi no Mikoto (息大布日意弥命), and as this is the largest keyhole-shaped kofun in the southern Kantō region, it is possible that it is the grave of that local ruler. Per local legend, it is the grave of a daughter of Takahashi no Mushimaro, a court official whose poems appear in the Man'yōshū; however, he lived in the Nara period, at least two centuries after this tumulus was completed.

The tumulus is a ten minute walk from Aohori Station on the JR East Uchibō Line.

Total length
144 meters
Anterior rectangular portion
88 meters wide x 13 meters high, 2-tier
Posterior circular portion
88 meter diameter x 13 meters high, 2-tiers

== See also ==
- List of Historic Sites of Japan (Chiba)
