= Hanawa Shell Mound =

Jōmon period shell midden in Ichikawa, Kantō, Japan

Hanawa Shell Midden
- 花輪貝塚 (Japanese)
- Hanawa Shell Midden Hanawa Shell Mound (Japan)
- 35°36′54″N 140°09′39″E
- Type: shell midden, settlement
- Periods: Jōmon period
- Location: Wakaba-ku, Chiba, Japan
- Region: Kantō region

Site notes
- Public access: Yes (park)

The Hanawa Shell Midden (花輪貝塚, Hanawa kaizuka) is an archaeological site in the Kasori neighborhood of Wakaba ward of the city of Ichikawa, Chiba Prefecture, in the Kantō region of Japan containing a Jōmon period shell midden and settlement ruin. The midden was designated a National Historic Site of Japan in 2006.

== Overview ==
During the early to middle Jōmon period (approximately 4000 to 2500 BC), sea levels were five to six meters higher than at present, and the ambient temperature was also 2 deg C higher. During this period, the Kantō region was inhabited by the Jōmon people, many of whom lived in coastal settlements. The middens associated with such settlements contain bone, botanical material, mollusc shells, sherds, lithics, and other artifacts and ecofacts associated with the now-vanished inhabitants, and these features, provide a useful source into the diets and habits of Jōmon society. Most of these middens are found along the Pacific coast of Japan. Of the approximately 2400 shell middens in the throughout Japan, about 120 are concentrated in Chiba city.

The Hanawa Shell Midden is located on a tongue-shaped plateau with an elevation of about 30 meters above the present day sea level on the north bank of the confluence of Miyakogawa River with the Nitona River. This is an area with a dense concentration of shell mounds, (the Special Natural history Site Kasori Shell Mound is located 800 meters to the north), and so was a densely populated area in the Jōmon period. The existence of a shell mound at the Hanawa location has been known for a long time, but it was mentioned inn academic literature only in 1941. It was only excavated in 2003 when the landowner attempted to develop the site into a housing estate.

The excavation found that the site consisted of several shell middens in an annular distribution, forming a shell ring with a diameter of about 120 meter. The midden dates to the latter half of the Jōmon period, or approximately 4000 years ago. Unusually, the midden contained mostly shells of Umbonium moniliferum snails, and only a small amounts of clams, including brackish-watered Yamato-shjimi. From the edge of the plateau to the slope, the foundations of 29 pit dwellings contemporary with the shell middens were confirmed, forming a ring-shaped village that surrounding a central plaza, which in turn was surrounded by the shell ring midden. In addition, the foundations of 50 pit dwellings from the Kofun period, extending into the Heian period were found, indicating that the site has been occupied for several thousand years.

The site is a five-minute walk from the "Kazori Naka Entrance" bus stop on the Keisei Bus from JR Chiba Station.

== See also ==
- List of Historic Sites of Japan (Chiba)
