= Yoshibumi Shell Mound =

Archaeological site in Japan

Yoshibumi Shell Midden
- 良文貝塚 (Japanese)
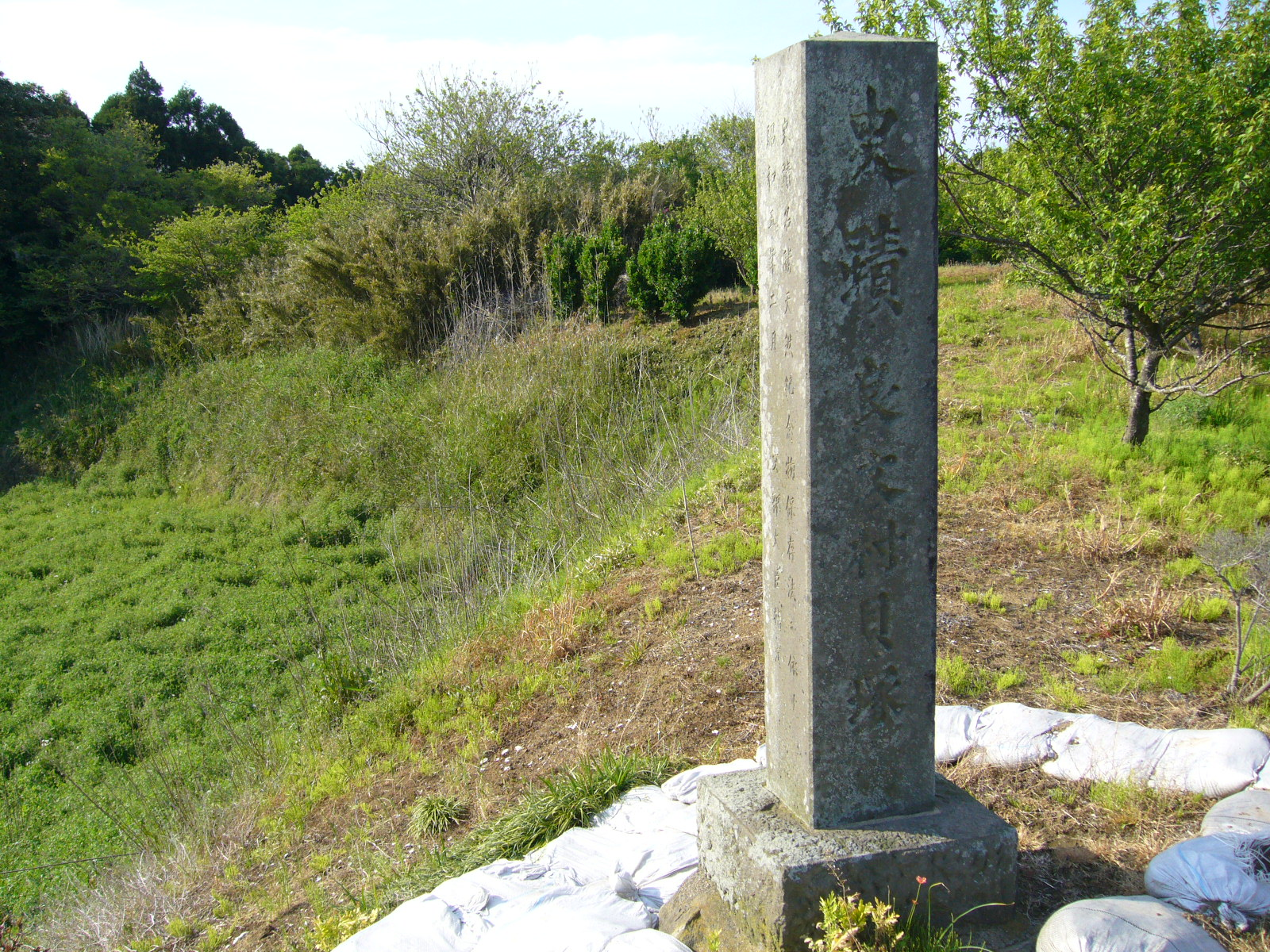
- Yoshibumi Shell Midden

- Yoshibumi Shell Midden Yoshibumi Shell Mound (Japan)
- 35°48′57″N 140°38′29″E
- Type: shell midden
- Periods: Jōmon period
- Location: Katori, Chiba, Japan
- Region: Kantō region

Site notes
- Public access: Yes (park)

The Yoshibumi Shell Midden (良文貝塚, Yoshibumi kaizuka) is an archaeological site in the Kaizuka neighborhood of the city of Katori, Chiba Prefecture, in the Kantō region of Japan containing a Jōmon period shell midden and settlement ruin. The site was designated a National Historic Site of Japan in 1930. It was the first shell midden to receive National Historic Site designation in Chiba Prefecture.

== Overview ==
During the early to middle Jōmon period (approximately 4000 to 2500 BC), sea levels were five to six meters higher than at present, and the ambient temperature was also 2 deg C higher. During this period, the Kantō region was inhabited by the Jōmon people, many of whom lived in coastal settlements. The middens associated with such settlements contain bone, botanical material, mollusc shells, sherds, lithics, and other artifacts and ecofacts associated with the now-vanished inhabitants, and these features, provide a useful source into the diets and habits of Jōmon society. Most of these middens are found along the Pacific coast of Japan. Of the approximately 2400 shell middens throughout Japan, about 120 are concentrated in Chiba city.

The Yoshibumi midden is located on the southwest bank of the Kurobe River, near its confluence with the Tone River at an elevation of 50 meters above the present sea levels. It is on a plateau slope sandwiched between valleys, and is one of the largest middens to have been found in the lower reaches of the Tone River. The site consists of nine large and small middens scattered about 330 meters east-to-west by 160 meters north-to-south area and dates from the middle to late Jōmon period. The shell layer has a thickness of over three meters. The site was first excavated in 1929. Excavated artifacts included Jōmon pottery from the early to middle portion of the late Jōmon period, mainly Horinouchi-type II and Kasori Type B along with stone tools, bone spearpoints and bracelets made from shell. Some of the pottery found included anthropomorphic jars of unknown purpose. The types of clam shells found in the midden included hamaguri and shijimi. although many other species were represented, as well as fish bones from stingrays, sharks, sea bass and fugu and animal bones from Japanese macaques, wild boar, sitka deer and dogs. In an excavation conducted in 2008, the foundations of pit dwellings and prehistoric storage pits were confirmed.

The site is about 15 minutes by car from Omigawa Station on the JR East Narita Line.

== See also ==
- List of Historic Sites of Japan (Chiba)
