= Tsukinoki Shell Mound =

Tsukinoki Shell Midden
- 月ノ木貝塚 (Japanese)
- Tsukinoki Shell Midden Tsukinoki Shell Mound (Japan)
- 35°35′43″N 140°09′28″E
- Type: shell midden, settlement
- Periods: Jōmon period
- Location: Chūō-ku, Chiba, Japan
- Region: Kantō region

Site notes
- Public access: Yes (no public facilities)

The Tsukinoki Shell Midden (月ノ木貝塚, Tsukinoki kaizuka) is an archaeological site in the Ninomachi neighborhood of Chūō ward of the city of Chiba, Chiba Prefecture, in the Kantō region of Japan containing a Jōmon period shell midden and settlement ruin. The site was designated a National Historic Site of Japan in 1978, with the area under protection extended in 2002 and again in 2006

== Overview ==
During the early to middle Jōmon period (approximately 4000 to 2500 BC), sea levels were five to six meters higher than at present, and the ambient temperature was also 2 deg C higher. During this period, the Kantō region was inhabited by the Jōmon people, many of whom lived in coastal settlements. The middens associated with such settlements contain bone, botanical material, mollusc shells, sherds, lithics, and other artifacts and ecofacts associated with the now-vanished inhabitants, and these features, provide a useful source into the diets and habits of Jōmon society. Most of these middens are found along the Pacific coast of Japan. Of the approximately 2400 shell middens in the throughout Japan, about 120 are concentrated in Chiba city.

The Tsukinoki midden is located at an elevation of approximately 25 meters above the present-day sea level, on the banks of the Miyakogawa River that flows through the center of Chiba City. This would have been a tongue of land extending into saltwater marshes during the time of the midden's construction. The midden dates from the middle to the late Jōmon period (approximately 4500 years ago) and has a thickness of 1.2 to 1.5 meters. As a result of a topographic survey and test drilling of about ten square meters conducted in the northeastern part of the midden in 1951, it was confirmed to have a horseshoe-shape, forming a partial shell ring that opens northward, with dimensions of 150 meters east-to-west and 200 meters north-to-south. From the bottom of the shell layer, the foundations of four pit dwellings from the middle Jōmon period were also found. The largest of these was oval, with a major axis of 6.7 meters and minor axis of 4.7 meters, and had been reconstructed at least twice.

A subsequent archaeological excavation in 1991 revealed that the horseshoe-shape opened to the east, rather than the north. In addition to Jōmon pottery and stone tools found, many artifacts including as a polished stone axe, tools made from animal bone, a bracelet made from abalone shell, and earplug-shaped clay ornaments were excavated. Shells in the midden included hamaguri, asari, kesago, and other shellfish of the inner Tokyo Bay area, as well as bones of birds, fish, animals and even of whales although the size of clams at the midden was unusually small.

The excavated artifacts are stored and displayed at Chiba City Kasori Kaizuka Museum (千葉市立加曽利貝塚博物館, Chiba Kenritsu Kasori Kaizuka Hakubutsukan). The site is located at the "Hoshiguki" bus stop on the Keisei bus from JR Chiba Station.

== See also ==
- List of Historic Sites of Japan (Chiba)
