= Sanya Shell Mound =

Archeological Site in Sodegaura, Chiba Perfectura, Japan

- 山野貝塚 (Japanese)
- Sanya Shell Mound Sanya Shell Mound (Japan)
- 35°25′48″N 139°57′17″E
- Type: shell midden
- Periods: Jōmon period
- Location: Sodegaura, Chiba, Japan
- Region: Kantō region

Site notes
- Public access: Yes (no public facilities)

The Sanya Shell Midden (山野貝塚, Sanya kaizuka) is an archaeological site in the Iitomi neighborhood of the city of Sodegaura, Chiba Prefecture, in the Kantō region of Japan containing a Jōmon period shell midden. It was designated a National Historic Site of Japan in 2017 .

== Overview ==
During the early to middle Jōmon period (approximately 4000 to 2500 BC), sea levels were five to six meters higher than at present, and the ambient temperature was also 2 deg C higher. During this period, the Kantō region was inhabited by the Jōmon people, many of whom lived in coastal settlements. The middens associated with such settlements contain bone, botanical material, mollusc shells, sherds, lithics, and other artifacts and ecofacts associated with the now-vanished inhabitants, and these features, provide a useful source into the diets and habits of Jōmon society. Most of these middens are found along the Pacific coast of Japan.

The Sanya midden is located in the middle of the western side of the Bōsō Peninsula, facing Tokyo Bay. It is one of the largest middens in Chiba Prefecture, measuring approximately 110 meters north-to-south by 140 meters east-to-west in a horseshoe-shape. The maximum thickness of the shell layer is 1.3 meters. The adjacent settlement traces next to the midden are from the late to the final Jōmon period, but the main formation period of the shell layer is the late Jōmon period. Shards of Jōmon pottery from many different origins have been found in the midden, indicating that the inhabitants of the settlement had trade with many other communities, some of which are located in the Tohoku or Kansai regions of Japan. In addition, stone tools made from stone originating in Nagano and Niigata Prefecture have been found. The midden also contained stone or bone fish hooks and harpoon heads and pressed clay fishing weights, along with the bones of fish typically found in the inner areas of Tokyo Bay, as well as typical pelagic migratory fish, such as bonito and tuna. Animal bones (deer, wild boar) as well as large marine mammal bones (dolphin and whale) have also been found. The site has been excavated seven times since 1973.

The site was backfilled after excavation, and as it is located on private land, there is no public access.

== See also ==
- List of Historic Sites of Japan (Chiba)
