= Shimōsa Kogane Nakano Pasture =

Edo Period (1603-1868) horse ranch in Kamagaya, Japan

Shimōsa Kogane Nakano ranch
- 下総小金中野牧跡 (Japanese)
- Shimōsa Kogane Nakano ranch Shimōsa Kogane Nakano Pasture (Japan)
- 35°46′32″N 139°59′35″E
- Periods: Edo period
- Location: Kamagaya, Chiba, Japan
- Region: Kantō region

Site notes
- Public access: Yes

The Shimōsa Kogane Nakano ranch (下総小金中野牧跡, Shimōsa kogane nakano makiato) was a government-operated horse ranch during he Edo Period of Japan, which operated to supply cavalry mounts for the Tokugawa shogunate. It was located in what is now part of the city of Kamagaya, Chiba Prefecture in the Kantō region of Japan. The location was designated a National Historic Site of Japan in 2007.

== Overview ==
The Tokugawa shogunate established several horse ranches in the vicinity of Edo under its direct control in order to ensure a reliable and constant supply of cavalry horses. These included several sites in Shimōsa Province, as well as sites in Awa Province and Suruga Province. The pastures in Shimōsa were located on the vast Kantō Plain, and were historically pasture land from at least the late Heian period. It was from this area that Taira no Masakado and later Minamoto no Yoritomo obtained their cavalry horses. The Kogane Nakano pasture was established by Tokugawa Ieyasu in the Keichō period (1596–1615) and survived until the Meiji Restoration of 1868. In the latter half of the Edo period, it consisted of five separate ranches: Takada, Ueno, Nakano, Shimono, and Inzai. The Nakano ranch covered what is now much of the cities of Kashiwa, Matsudo, Kamagaya, Shiroi, and Funabashi. This vast area was also used by shogun Tokugawa Yoshimune as hunting grounds for deer. Yoshimune gave special attention to the Nakano and Shimono locations and expanded operations from 1722. There was also a facility at the Nakano pastures for the immediate family of the shogun to come for horse riding. The total area of the facility was 15,000 hectares by the end of the Edo period.

The horses raised on these ranches were wild horses allowed to roam freely in herds across the area. They were rounded up once a year to be broken for military use, with each horse farm having one capture site. The capture site at Nakano is still fairly well preserved and was constructed in the Genbun era (1736–1746). The horses were driven into an enclosure surrounded by an earthen embankment with a height of three to five meters. Of the wild horses that were captured, three-year-old horses were trained for riding or were dismissed and sold as farm or pack animals to surrounding residents. Some were released back into the wild after branding to identify which ranch they belonged to. The number of horses sold to commoners was very small, but it provided a stable income for the ranch. The annual horse roundup became a tourist event that drew many sightseers from Edo.

The National Historic Site designation marker is located at the Nakano capture site, which is a five-minute walk from Kita-Hatsutomi Station on the Shin-Keisei Electric Railway.

== See also ==
- List of Historic Sites of Japan (Chiba)
