= Ryūkaku-ji =

Temple in Sakae, Chiba

- 龍角寺
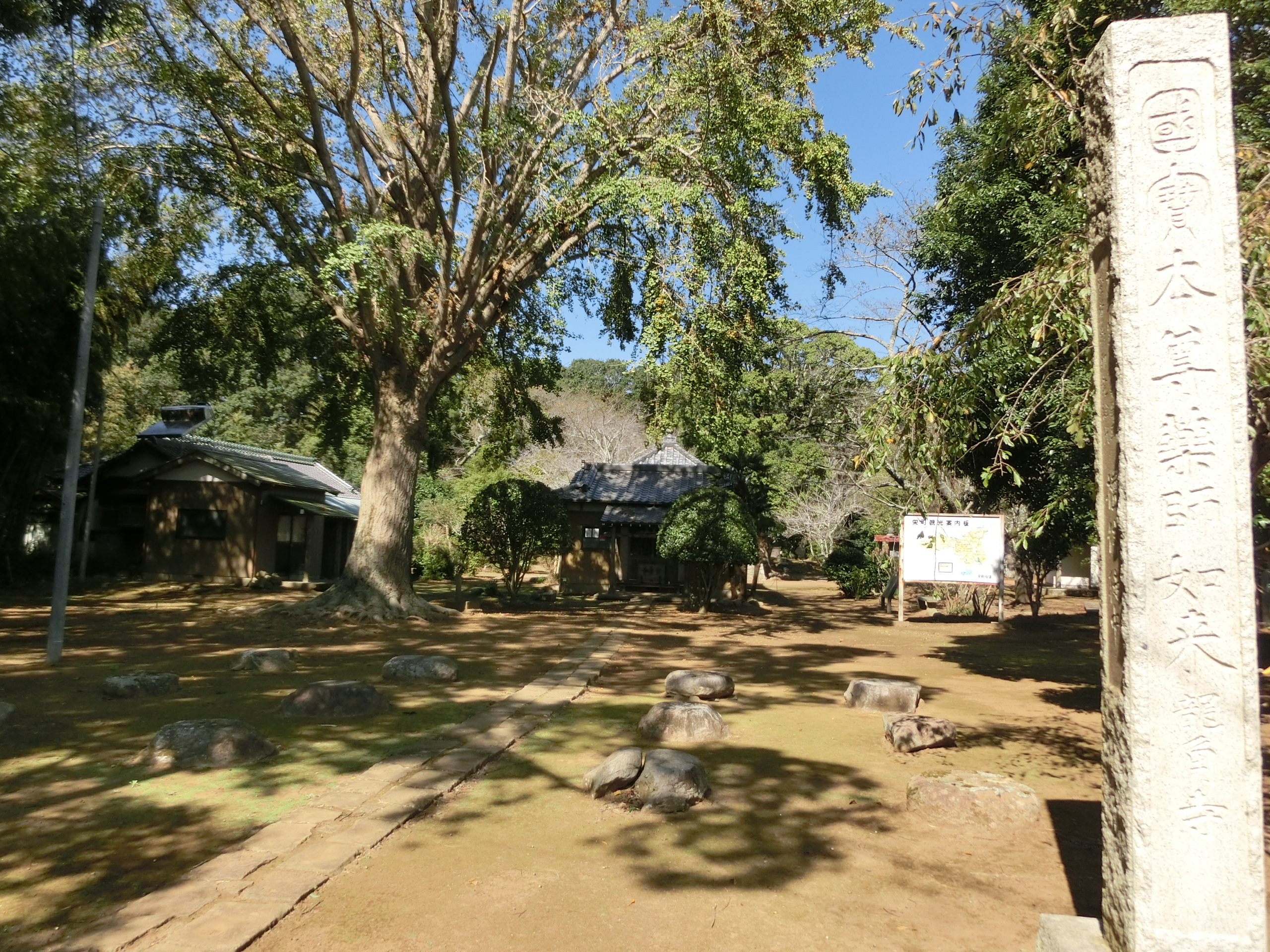

- Location within Chiba Prefecture Location within Japan

Religion
- Affiliation: Buddhist
- Deity: Yakushi Nyōrai
- Rite: Tendai
- Status: active

Location
- Location: Sakae, Chiba
- Country: Japan
- Interactive map of Ryūkaku-ji
- Coordinates: 35°50′01″N 140°16′11″E

Architecture
- Completed: Asuka period

Ryūkaku-ji (龍角寺, Ryūkaku-ji) is a Buddhist temple located in the town of Sakae, Chiba, Japan. The temple belongs to the Tendai sect, and its main image is a statue of Yakushi Nyōrai. The temple grounds were designated as a National Historic Site in 1933. Per archaeological investigations, the temple was founded in the early 7th century AD and is one of the oldest known temples in eastern Japan.

== Overview ==
Ryūkaku-ji is located on a plateau near the shore of Lake Inba. The origins of the temple are uncertain, but per the temple's legend, it was founded in 709 AD during the reign of Empress Genmei, when a female dragon created a statue of Yakushi Nyōrai and built a chapel in a single night. The chapel was expanded into a temple by 730 AD. In 731 AD all of Japan was suffering from a great drought and Emperor Shōmu sent word that all temples were to pray for rain. Ryūkaku-ji's priest, along with his disciples, read the sutras and prayed for rain day and night. One day, a very tall old man appeared and announced that he was the Lord of Lake Inba, and that he wanted to give thanks, as due to the powers of their prayers all of his worldly sins had disappeared. As the temple had been built by a dragon, he asked that he show mercy to the people and make it rain. Ryūkaku-ji's priest recognized him to be an incarnation of a dragon. The old man replied that he was only a small dragon, and that it would be his life if he made it rain without permission from the great dragon, but since he owed a debt of gratitude, he would sacrifice himself. It then began to rain for seven days and nights. Afterwards, the people found the dragon split into three parts. The head was buried at Ryūkaku-ji (whose name means "Temple of the Dragon Head"), his torso was buried at Ryūfuku-ji (located in Inzai) and his lower body was buried at Ryūbi-ji (in Sōsa).

The temple was destroyed and rebuilt several times in its history, and its records are lost. However, its main image is a Hakuho period bronze statue of Yakushi Nyōrai, which is an National Important Cultural Property.

During archaeological investigations from 1970, the foundations of a pagoda measuring 10.8 meters square. The temple is recorded as repairing its three-story pagoda in 1377, but from the size of the foundations and the huge granite block used to support the central pillar, the original pagoda had a height of around 33 meters and was probably a six-story structure. The center block measures 2.49 x 2.03 meters with an 81.8 cm hole in the center, tapering to 66.6 cm over a depth of 12.1 cm, with drainage grooves. Further finds include the foundation stones for the Nara period Kondō and the South Gate, along with many roof tiles. The layout of the buildings and the style of the rood tiles are all patterned after the temple of Yamada-dera in Asuka, all pointing to the temple's antiquity. The location of the temple is in an area with a very high concentration of burial mounds and ancient sites from the Kofun period, and was the site of the Kuni no miyatsuko or local kings of Inba from before the establishment of the ritsuryō system of centralized government and firm Yamato control over the region. The area is also believed to have been the home territory of the Soga clan and the temple may have been constructed by Soga no Kurayamada no Ishikawa no Maro.

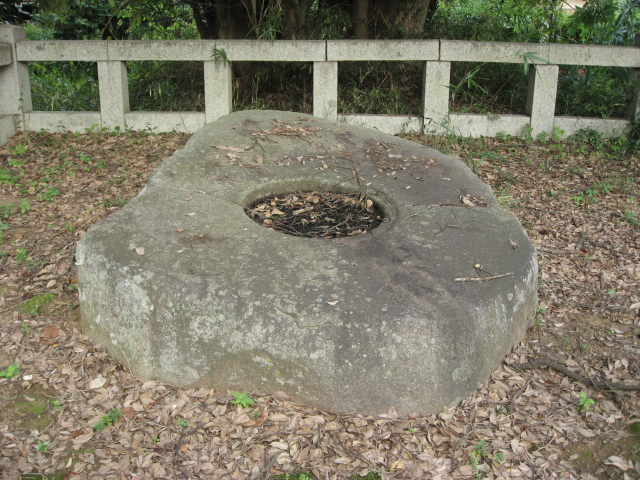
龍角寺境内の塔址（国の史跡）

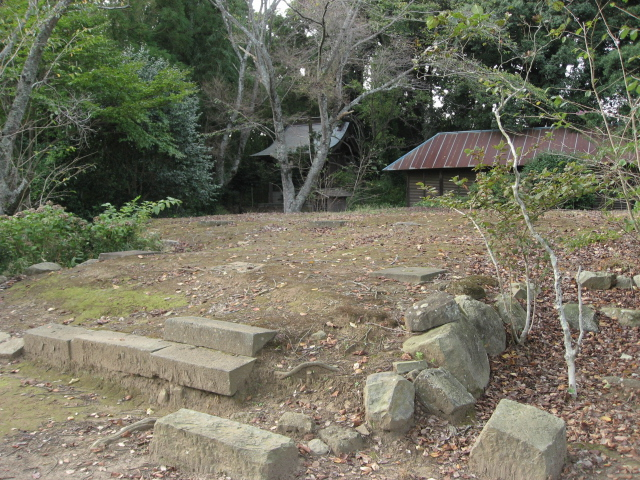
金堂跡

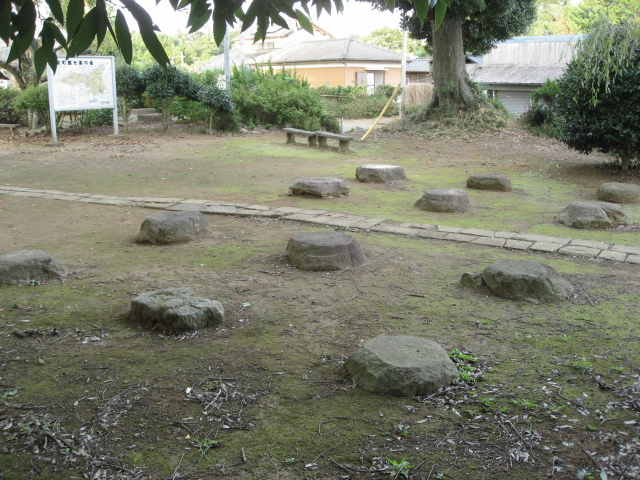
仁王門跡

== See also ==
- List of Historic Sites of Japan (Chiba)
