= Biofact =

Biofact may refer to:

- Biofact (archaeology)
- Biofact (biology)
- Biofact (philosophy)
