= Biofacticity =

Philosophical concept

Biofacticity is a philosophical concept that allows to identify a living object as a so-called biofact, i.e. a semi-natural living entity which has been biotechnically interfered during its life-span such as transgenic plants or cloned organisms. In philosophy, sociology and the arts, a biofact stands in close relation to the anthropological concept of the human being a composite of nature and technology. Biofact was introduced to philosophy as a neologism in 2001 by the German philosopher Nicole C. Karafyllis and fuses the words artifact and the prefix "bio". One of Karafyllis' thesis is that a technical change in living objects, i.e. an increase in biofacticity, will shift the anthropological concept of hybridity towards a technological self-definition of the human.

== Biofacticity vs. hybridity ==
Hybridity takes into account the anthropological fact that humans are hybrid with both natural and technical essences, making them designers with an individual "Leib," which is a term in phenomenology that denotes subjectivity of one's own corporeality. Biofacticity, on the other hand, is an epistemological and ontological term that reflects upon the anthropological term of hybridity. The latter deals with the self-definition of subjects rather than objects. Hybridity, thus, is an anthropological concept particularly when used for philosophical purposes while biofacticity is an epistemological concept. Both of these concepts demonstrate the hybrid character of the human being as a growing and creative entity who acts in light of self-determined ends. Theorists cite that this view becomes a broad approach in understanding the idea of life not merely as a biological process or functions of the genetic code.

== Bibliography ==
- Nicole C. Karafyllis. Biofakte - Versuch über den Menschen zwischen Artefakt und Lebewesen. Paderborn: Mentis 2003 (in German)
