= Yoshigo Shell Midden =

Archaeological site in the Tōkai region of Japan

Yoshigo shell midden
- 吉胡貝塚 (Japanese)
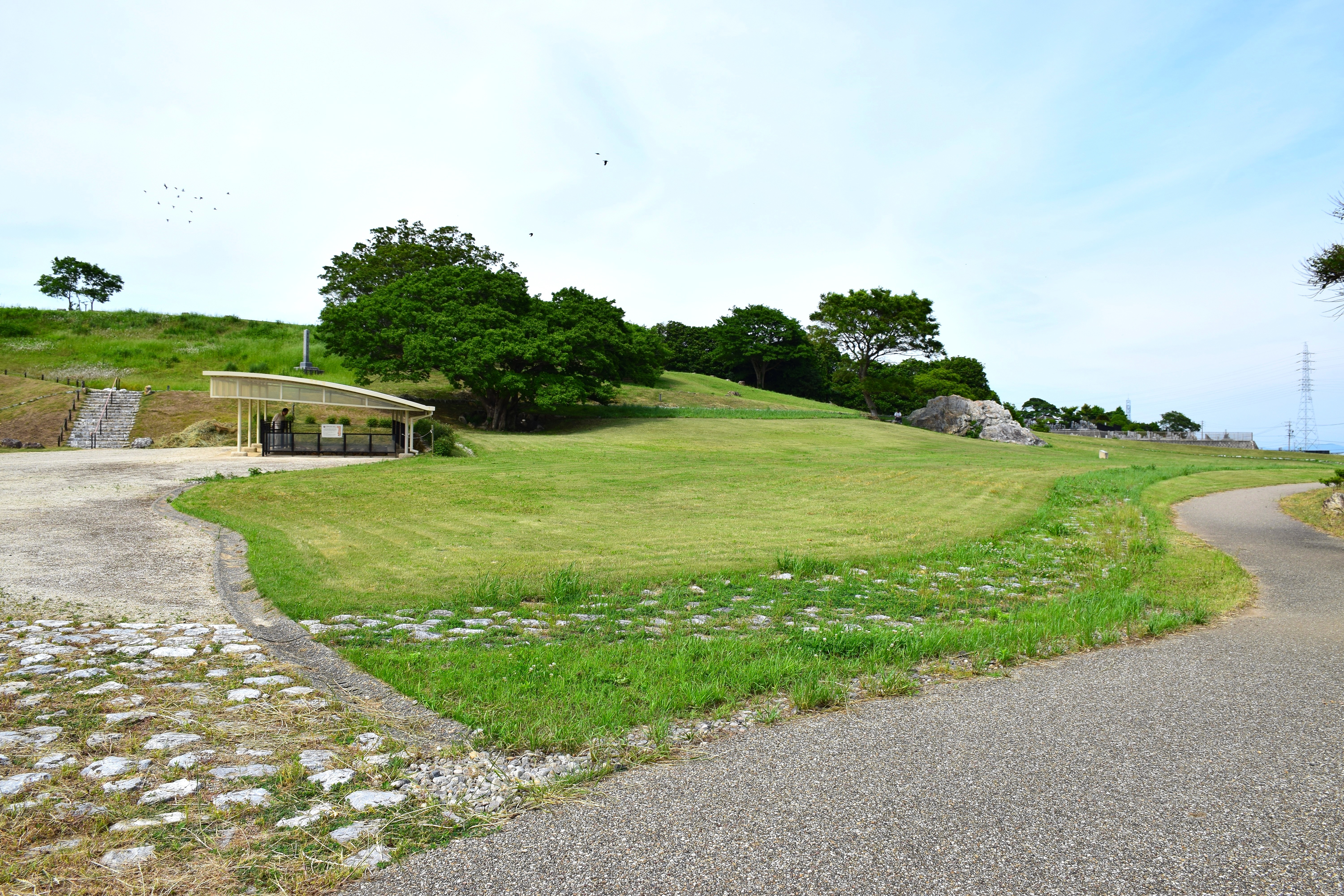
- Yoshigo Shell Midden

- Yoshigo Shell Midden Yoshigo Shell Midden (Japan)
- 34°40′54″N 137°16′51″E
- Type: shell midden, settlement
- Periods: Jōmon period
- Location: Tahara, Aichi, Japan
- Region: Tōkai region

Site notes
- Elevation: 7 m (23 ft)
- Area: 20,382 m^{2} (219,390 sq ft)
- Public access: Yes, (on-site museum)

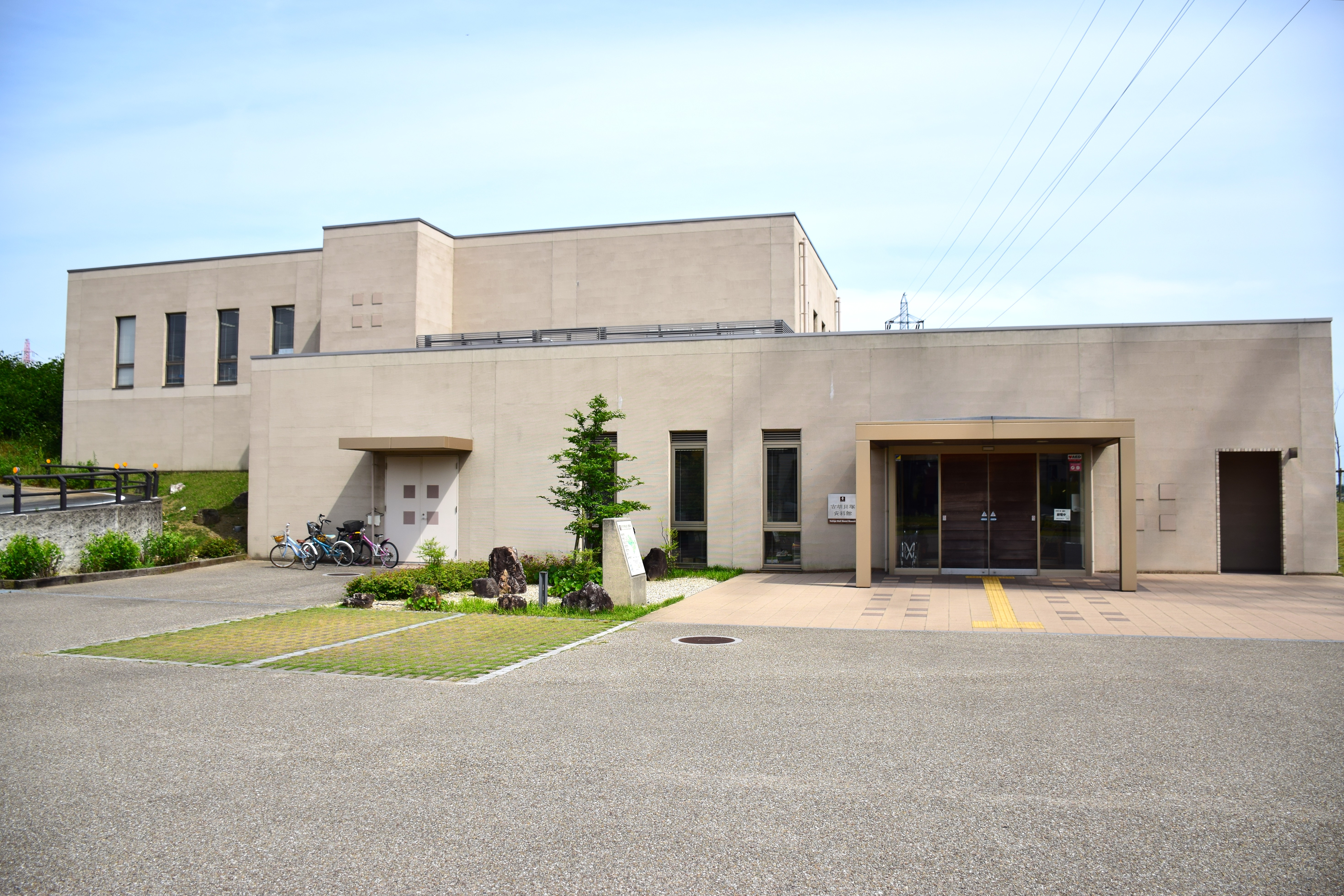
Yoshigo Shell Midden Museum

The Yoshigo Shell Midden (吉胡貝塚, Yoshigo kaizuka) is an archaeological site containing a Jōmon period shell midden located in the Yoshigo neighborhood of the city of Tahara, Aichi on the Atsumi Peninsula in the Tōkai region of Japan. The site was designated a National Historic Site of Japan in 1951.

== Overview ==
During the early to middle Jōmon period (approximately 4000 to 2500 BC), sea levels were five to six meters higher than at present, and the ambient temperature was also 2 deg C higher. During this period, the Kantō region was inhabited by the Jōmon people, many of whom lived in coastal settlements. The middens associated with such settlements contain bone, botanical material, mollusc shells, sherds, lithics, and other artifacts and ecofacts associated with the now-vanished inhabitants, and these features, provide a useful source into the diets and habits of Jōmon society. Most of these middens are found along the Pacific coast of Japan.

The Yoshigo Shell Midden dates from the late to final Jōmon period, in an alluvial area with an elevation of six meters above the current sea level, on a gentle slope facing Atsumi Bay. The midden is not very large, with an area of 4100 square meters, but is considered large for the region. It was found to contain a variety of shells, fish and animal bones and broken bone tools, and pottery shards. Of note was discovery of a large Jōmon period necropolis containing the intact remains of 341 individuals. Of these burials, 163 were in which the arms of the deceased were bent, 16 had the arms extended, and 42 were in clay jars. Many of the skulls showed that front teeth had been removed, confirming a trait of Jōmon culture which has been known from other sites. The Yoshigo Shell Midden was excavated from 1922 to 1923 and contributed greatly to knowledge of Jōmon anthropology. In addition, the traces of several pit dwellings were also found in the vicinity, and artifacts such as Jōmon pottery, stone tools and other items have been discovered.

The site is now preserved as an archaeological park with the associated Yoshigo Shell Midden Museum (吉胡貝塚資料館, Yoshigo Kaizuka shiryōkan). It is located 20 minutes on foot from the Toyohashi Railway Mikawa Tahara Station.

== See also ==
- List of Historic Sites of Japan (Aichi)
