= Latgalians =

Ancient Baltic tribe

Latgalians (Latin: Lethi, Letthigalli, Low German: Letti, Lethi, modern Latvian: latgaļi, letgaļi, leti; variant translations also include Latgallians, Lettigalls or Lettigallians) were an ancient Baltic tribe.

They likely spoke a variant of the Latvian language, which probably became the lingua franca in present-day Latvia during the Northern Crusades due to their alliance with the crusaders. Latgalians later integrated with the neighbouring tribes, forming the core of modern Latvians.

== History ==
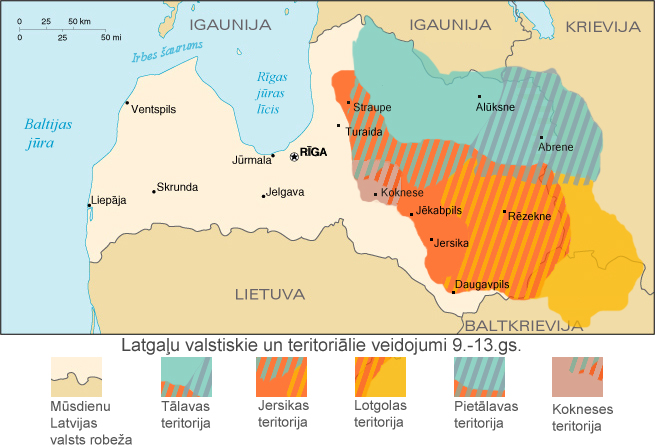
Latgallian territories around 9th-13th centuries according to various maps of history showing Jersika, Koknese, Talava and more.

The Latgalians were an Eastern Baltic tribe whose origin is little known. In the 5th and 6th centuries, they lived in the eastern part of present-day Vidzeme (west of the Aiviekste River), and later on in nearly all the territory of that region. In written sources, they are mentioned from the 11th century onward. In the first two decades of the 13th century, the (Western) Latgalians allied with German (mainly Saxon) crusaders. Their lands (the Eldership of Tālava, the Principality of Jersika , and the Principality of Koknese) were incorporated into Livonia as vassal states.

The Latgalians in the context of the other Baltic tribes, ca. 1200 CE, the Eastern Balts are shown in brown and the Western Balts are shown in green (boundaries are approximate). Baltic territory was extensive inland.

In the 11th century, Eastern Orthodoxy started to spread in Latgalian lands from Polotsk and Pskov. In the 12th century, Latgalian lands and their rulers paid tribute to the dukes of Polotsk. During the Livonian crusade in the 13th century, Latgalian elders switched from Eastern Orthodoxy to Roman Catholicism and became vassals of the Livonian Order.

Because of the crusade, many regions of Semigallia and Courland were left depopulated. Thus, part of the Latgalians migrated to those regions both during and after the war. Material culture characteristic of Latgalians disappeared by the 16th century as they gradually lost cultural differences to other inhabitants of modern Latvia and evolved into present-day ethnic Latvians.

== Archaeological data ==
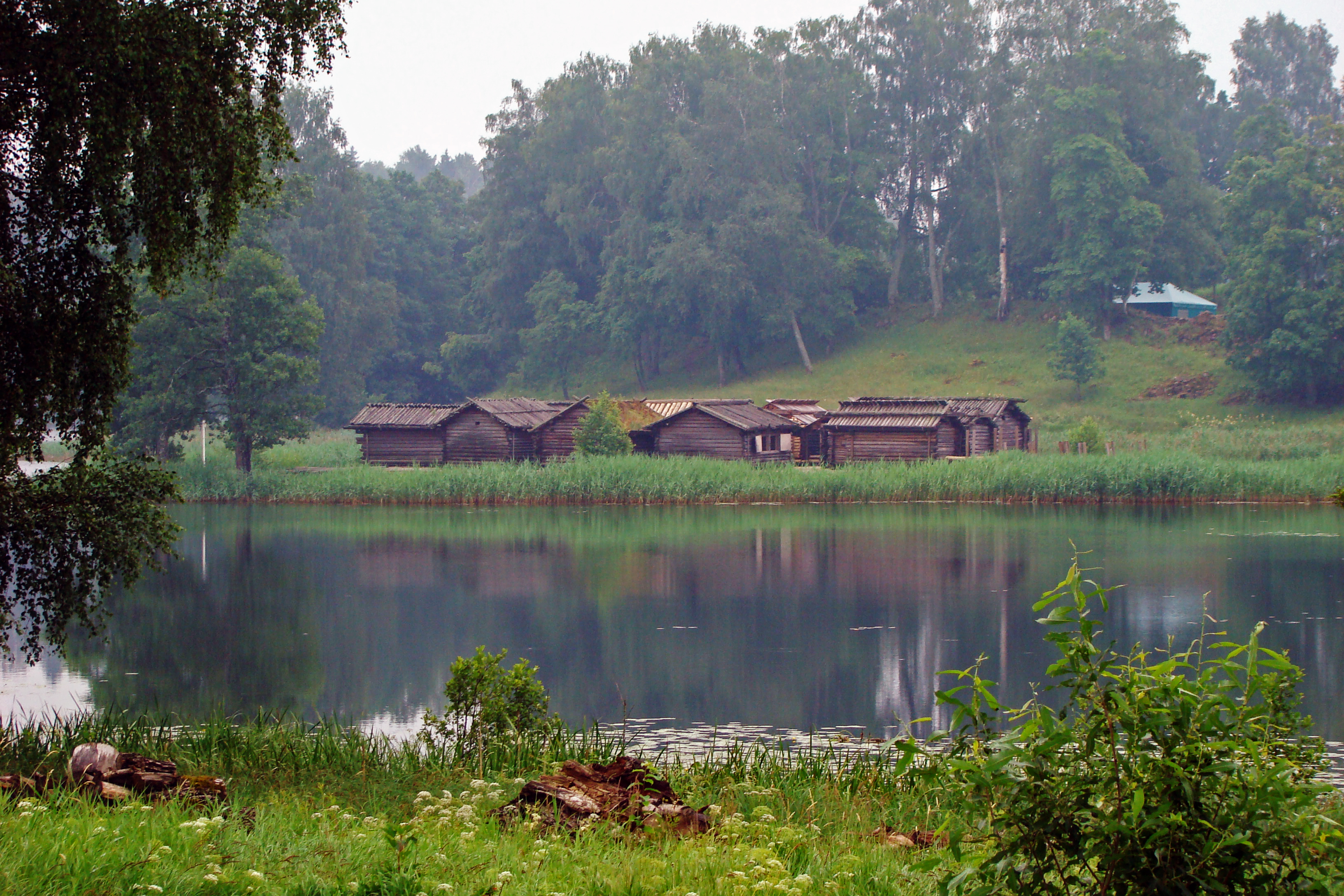
The Āraiši lake fortress (reconstruction)

In the lands inhabited by Western and the Eastern Latgalians, about 80 flat cemeteries of Western Latgalian origin have been excavated, with more than two thousand burials uncovered. The first large scale excavations took place in Ludza Odukalns Cemetery in Latgale (1890–1891), where 339 Late Iron Age burials were uncovered. In the excavations at Pildas Nukši Cemetery (in Latgale, 1947–1948), 218 burials were uncovered, dated to the 9th to 12th centuries.

At the Zvirgzdenes Kivti Cemetery (in Latgale: 1948, 1955–1958), 175 burials from the 7th to 12th centuries were excavated. 315 burials were found at Aglonas Kristapiņi Cemetery (in Latgale; 1928, 1938, 1977–1980, 1984–1987, 1999–2000), in use from the late 8th century to the 12th century.

Ērgļu Jaunāķēni Cemetery was totally excavated in 1971–1972, with 89 burials found. At Koknese Cemetery, 102 burials from the Late Iron Age were uncovered (1986–1989). In the area of the Gauja river, two Latgalian cemeteries, Drabešu Liepiņas and Priekuļu Ģūģeri, have been excavated too.

Archaeological excavations have also been carried out on the hillforts of Ķente, Koknese, Sārumkalns, Tanīskalns, as well as on other Latgalian sites. Only a few (Western) Latgalian settlements have been excavated. Large-scale excavations (1960s–1970s) and reconstruction have been done at the Āraiši lake fortress (9th century).

In Latgale, dating from the 6th and 7th centuries, there were flat cemeteries as well as barrow cemeteries. In the 9th and 10th centuries, the transition started from flat graves to barrows. There are about 15 excavated Eastern Latgalian barrow cemeteries, but in most of them, only a small number of barrows were investigated.

Archaeologically-identified dwelling sites in Latgale include hill forts, settlements, and lake fortresses. Among hillforts, the most well-researched one is Jersika Hillfort (excavated in 1939 and from 1990 onwards), forming a complex together with Dignāja Hillfort, on the opposite bank of the Daugava river. Jersika was occupied from the 10th to 14th centuries, probably after the decline of Dignāja, which had been inhabited since the 6th century.
