= Organic matter =

Matter composed of organic compounds

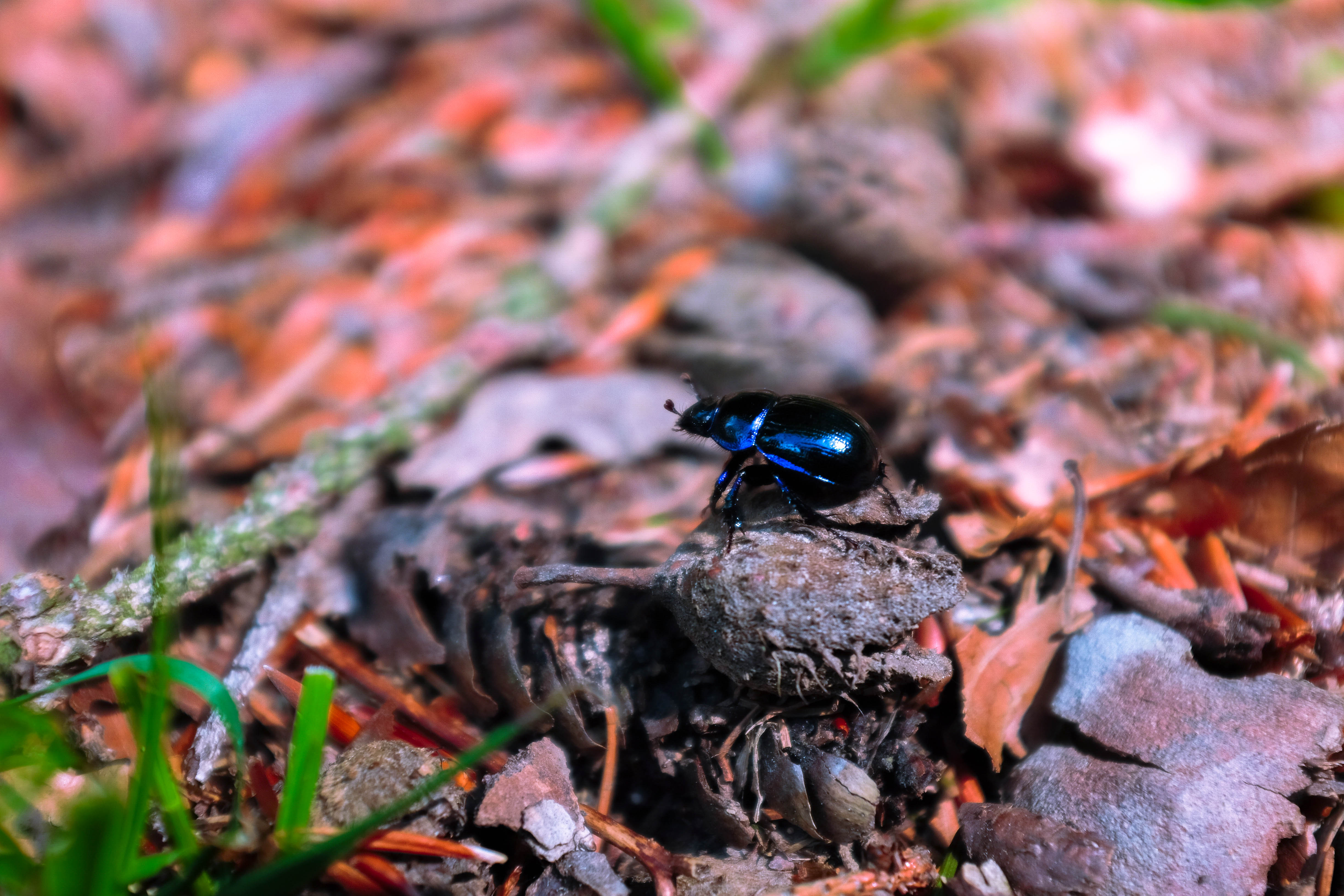
Beetle feeding on organic matter

Organic matter, organic material or natural organic matter (NOM) is the large source of carbon-based compounds found within natural and engineered, terrestrial, and aquatic environments. It is matter composed of organic compounds that have come from the feces and remains of organisms such as plants and animals. Organic molecules can also be made by chemical reactions that do not involve life. Basic structures are created from cellulose, tannin, cutin, and lignin, along with other various proteins, lipids, and carbohydrates. Organic matter is very important in the movement of nutrients in the environment and plays a role in water retention on the surface of the planet.

== Formation ==
Living organisms are composed of organic compounds that are secreted or excreted into their environment during life. Following the death of an organism, these materials—along with shed tissues like roots and leaves—are decomposed by microbial and fungal activity. Through a process of oxidative polymerization, these smaller degradation products can then recombine to form complex, larger-scale organic molecules.

The composition of natural organic matter depends on its origin, transformation mode, age, and existing environment, thus its bio-physicochemical functions and properties vary with different environments.

== Natural ecosystem functions ==
Organic matter is common throughout the ecosystem and is cycled through decomposition processes by soil microbial communities that are crucial for nutrient availability. After degrading and reacting, it can move into soil and mainstream water via waterflow. Organic matter provides nutrition to living organisms. Organic matter acts as a buffer in aqueous solutions to maintain a neutral pH in the environment. The buffer acting component has been proposed to be relevant for neutralizing acid rain.

== Source cycle ==
Some organic matter not already in the soil comes from groundwater. When the groundwater saturates the soil or sediment around it, organic matter can freely move between the phases. Groundwater has its own sources of natural organic matter including:

- organic matter deposits, such as kerogen and coal.
- soil and sediment organic matter.
- organic matter infiltrating into the subsurface from rivers, lakes, and marine systems."

Organisms decompose into organic matter, which is then transported and recycled. Not all biomass migrates, some is rather stationary, turning only over the course of millions of years.

== Soil organic matter ==
The organic matter in soil derives from plants, animals and microorganisms. In a forest, for example, leaf litter and woody materials fall to the forest floor. This is sometimes referred to as organic material. When it decays to the point in which it is no longer recognizable, it is called soil organic matter. When the organic matter has broken down into a stable substance that resists further decomposition it is called humus. Thus soil organic matter comprises all of the organic matter in the soil exclusive of the material that has not decayed.

An important property of soil organic matter is that it improves the capacity of a soil to hold water and nutrients, and allows their slow release, thereby improving the conditions for plant growth. Another advantage of humus is that it helps the soil to stick together which allows nematodes, or microscopic bacteria, to easily decay the nutrients in the soil.

There are several ways to quickly increase the amount of humus. Combining compost, plant or animal materials/waste, or green manure with soil will increase the amount of humus in the soil.

1. Compost: decomposed organic material.
2. Plant and animal material and waste: dead plants or plant waste such as leaves or bush and tree trimmings, or animal manure.
3. Green manure: plants or plant material that is grown for the sole purpose of being incorporated with soil.

These three materials supply nematodes and bacteria with nutrients for them to thrive and produce more humus, which will give plants enough nutrients to survive and grow.

Soil organic matter is crucial to all ecology and to all agriculture, but it is especially emphasized in organic farming, where it is relied upon especially heavily.

=== Priming effect ===
The priming effect is characterized by intense changes in the natural process of soil organic matter (SOM) turnover, resulting from relatively moderate intervention with the soil. The phenomenon is generally caused by either pulsed or continuous changes to inputs of fresh organic matter (FOM). Priming effects usually result in an acceleration of mineralization due to a trigger such as the FOM inputs. The cause of this increase in decomposition has often been attributed to an increase in microbial activity resulting from higher energy and nutrient availability released from the FOM. After the input of FOM, specialized microorganisms are believed to grow quickly and only decompose this newly added organic matter. The turnover rate of SOM in these areas is at least one order of magnitude higher than the bulk soil.

Other soil treatments, besides organic matter inputs, which lead to this short-term change in turnover rates, include "input of mineral fertilizer, exudation of organic substances by roots, mere mechanical treatment of soil or its drying and rewetting."

Priming effects can be either positive or negative depending on the reaction of the soil with the added substance. A positive priming effect results in the acceleration of mineralization while a negative priming effect results in immobilization, leading to N unavailability. Although most changes have been documented in C and N pools, the priming effect can also be found in phosphorus and sulfur, as well as other nutrients.

Löhnis was the first to discover the priming effect phenomenon in 1926 through his studies of green manure decomposition and its effects on legume plants in soil. He noticed that when adding fresh organic residues to the soil, it resulted in intensified mineralization by the humus N. It was not until 1953, though, that the term priming effect was given by Bingeman in his paper titled, The effect of the addition of organic material on the decomposition of an organic soil. Several other terms had been used before priming effect was coined, including priming action, added nitrogen interaction (ANI), extra N and additional N. Despite these early contributions, the concept of the priming effect was widely disregarded until about the 1980s-1990s.

The priming effect has been found in many different studies and is regarded as a common occurrence, appearing in most plant soil systems. However, the mechanisms which lead to the priming effect are more complex than originally thought, and still remain generally misunderstood.

Although there is a lot of uncertainty surrounding the reason for the priming effect, a few undisputed facts have emerged from the collection of recent research:

1. The priming effect can arise either instantaneously or very shortly (potentially days or weeks) after the addition of a substance is made to the soil.
2. The priming effect is larger in soils that are rich in C and N as compared to those poor in these nutrients.
3. Real priming effects have not been observed in sterile environments.
4. The size of the priming effect increases as the amount of added treatment to the soil increases.

Recent findings suggest that the same priming effect mechanisms acting in soil systems may also be present in aquatic environments, which suggests a need for broader considerations of this phenomenon in the future.

== Decomposition ==
One suitable definition of organic matter is biological material in the process of decaying or decomposing, such as humus. A closer look at the biological material in the process of decaying reveals so-called organic compounds (biological molecules) in the process of breaking up (disintegrating).

The main processes by which soil molecules disintegrate are by bacterial or fungal enzymatic catalysis. If bacteria or fungi were not present on Earth, the process of decomposition would have proceeded much slower.

Various factors impact the decomposition of organic matter including its chemical properties and other environmental parameters. Metabolic capabilities of the microbial communities play a crucial role on decomposition since they are highly connected with the energy availability and processing. In terrestrial ecosystems the energy status of soil organic matter has been shown to affect microbial substrate preferences. Some organic matter pools may be energetically favorable for the microbial communities resulting in their fast oxidation and decomposition, in comparison with other pools where microbial degraders get less return from the energy they invest. By extension, soil microorganisms preferentially mineralize high-energy organic matter, avoiding decomposing less energetically dense organic matter.

== Organic chemistry ==
Measurements of organic matter generally measure only organic compounds or carbon, and so are only an approximation of the level of once living or decomposed matter. Some definitions of organic matter likewise only consider "organic matter" to refer to only the carbon content or organic compounds and do not consider the origins or decomposition of the matter. In this sense, not all organic compounds are created by living organisms, and living organisms do not only leave behind organic material. A clam's shell, for example, while biotic, does not contain much organic carbon, so it may not be considered organic matter in this sense. Conversely, urea is one of many organic compounds that can be synthesized without any biological activity.

Organic matter is heterogeneous and very complex. Generally, organic matter, in terms of weight, is:

- 45–55% carbon
- 35–45% oxygen
- 3–5% hydrogen
- 1–4% nitrogen

The molecular weights of these compounds can vary drastically, depending on if they repolymerize or not, from 200 to 20,000 amu. Up to one-third of the carbon present is in aromatic compounds in which the carbon atoms form usually six-membered rings. These rings are very stable due to resonance stabilization, so they are challenging to break down. The aromatic rings are also susceptible to electrophilic and nucleophilic attacks from other electron-donating or electron-accepting material, which explains the possible polymerization to create larger molecules of organic matter.

Some reactions occur with organic matter and other materials in the soil to create compounds never seen before. Unfortunately, it is challenging to characterize these because so little is known about natural organic matter in the first place. Research is currently being done to determine more about these new compounds and how many are being formed.

== Aquatic ==
Aquatic organic matter can be further divided into two components: (1) dissolved organic matter (DOM), measured as colored dissolved organic matter (CDOM) or dissolved organic carbon (DOC), and (2) particulate organic matter (POM). They are typically differentiated by that which can pass through a 0.45 micrometre filter (DOM), and that which cannot (POM).

=== Detection ===
Organic matter is important in water and wastewater treatment and recycling, natural aquatic ecosystems, aquaculture, and environmental rehabilitation. It is, therefore, important to have reliable methods of detection and characterisation, for both short- and long-term monitoring. Various analytical detection methods for organic matter have existed for up to decades to describe and characterise organic matter. These include, but are not limited to: total and dissolved organic carbon, mass spectrometry, nuclear magnetic resonance (NMR) spectroscopy, infrared (IR) spectroscopy, UV-Visible spectroscopy, and fluorescence spectroscopy. Each of these methods has its advantages and limitations.

=== Water purification ===
The same capability of natural organic matter that helps with water retention in the soil creates problems for current water purification methods. In water, organic matter can still bind to metal ions and minerals. The purification process does not necessarily stop these bound molecules but does not cause harm to any humans, animals, or plants. However, because of the high reactivity of organic matter, by-products that do not contain nutrients can be made. These by-products can induce biofouling, which essentially clogs water filtration systems in water purification facilities, as the by-products are larger than membrane pore sizes. This clogging problem can be treated by chlorine disinfection (chlorination), which can break down residual material that clogs systems. However, chlorination can form disinfection by-products.

Water with organic matter can be disinfected with ozone-initiated radical reactions. The ozone (three oxygens) has powerful oxidation characteristics. It can form hydroxyl radicals (OH) when it decomposes, which will react with the organic matter to shut down the problem of biofouling.

== Vitalism ==
The equation of "organic" with living organisms comes from the now-abandoned idea of vitalism, which attributed a special force to life that alone could create organic substances. This idea was first questioned after Friedrich Wöhler artificially synthesized urea in 1828.

== See also ==
- Biofact (biology)
- Biomass
- Detritus
- Humus
- Organic geochemistry
- Sedimentary organic matter
- Total organic carbon

Compare with:

- Biological tissue
- Biomolecule
- Biotic material
- Cellular component
- Organic production

== Bibliography ==
- George Aiken (2002). "Organic Matter in Ground Water". United States Geological Survey.
- Cabaniss, Steve, Greg Madey, Patricia Maurice, Yingping Zhou, Laura Leff, Ola Olapade, Bob Wetzel, Jerry Leenheer, and Bob Wershaw, comps. Stochastic Synthesis of Natural Organic Matter. UNM, ND, KSU, UNC, USGS. 22 Apr. 2007.
- Cho, Min, Hyenmi Chung, and Jeyong Yoon. "Disinfection of Water Containing Natural Organic Matter by Using Ozone-Initiated Radical Reactions." Abstract. Applied and Environmental Microbiology Vol. 69 No.4 (2003): 2284–2291.
- Fortner, John D., Joseph B. Hughes, Jae-Hong Kim, and Hoon Hyung. "Natural Organic Matter Stabilizes Carbon Nanotubes in the Aqueous Phase." Abstract. Environmental Science & Technology Vol. 41 No. 1 (2007): 179–184.
- "Researchers Study Role of Natural Organic Matter in Environment." Science Daily 20 Dec. 2006. 22 Apr. 2007 https://www.sciencedaily.com/releases/2006/12/061211221222.htm.
- Senesi, Nicola, Baoshan Xing, and P.m. Huang. Biophysico-Chemical Processes Involving Natural Nonliving Organic Matter in Environmental Systems. New York: IUPAC, 2006.
- "Table 1: Surface Area, Volume, and Average Depth of Oceans and Seas." Encyclopædia Britannica.
- "Topic Snapshot: Natural Organic Material." American Water Works Association Research Foundation. 2007. 22 Apr. 2007 https://web.archive.org/web/20070928102105/http://www.awwarf.org/research/TopicsAndProjects/topicSnapShot.aspx?Topic=Organic.
- United States of America. United States Geological Survey. Earth's Water Distribution. 10 May 2007. http://ga.water.usgs.gov/edu/waterdistribution.html
- Water Sheds: Organic Matter. North Carolina State University. 1 May 2007 http://www.water.ncsu.edu/watershedss/info/norganics.html.
