= Biofact (archaeology) =

Found organic material of archaeological significance

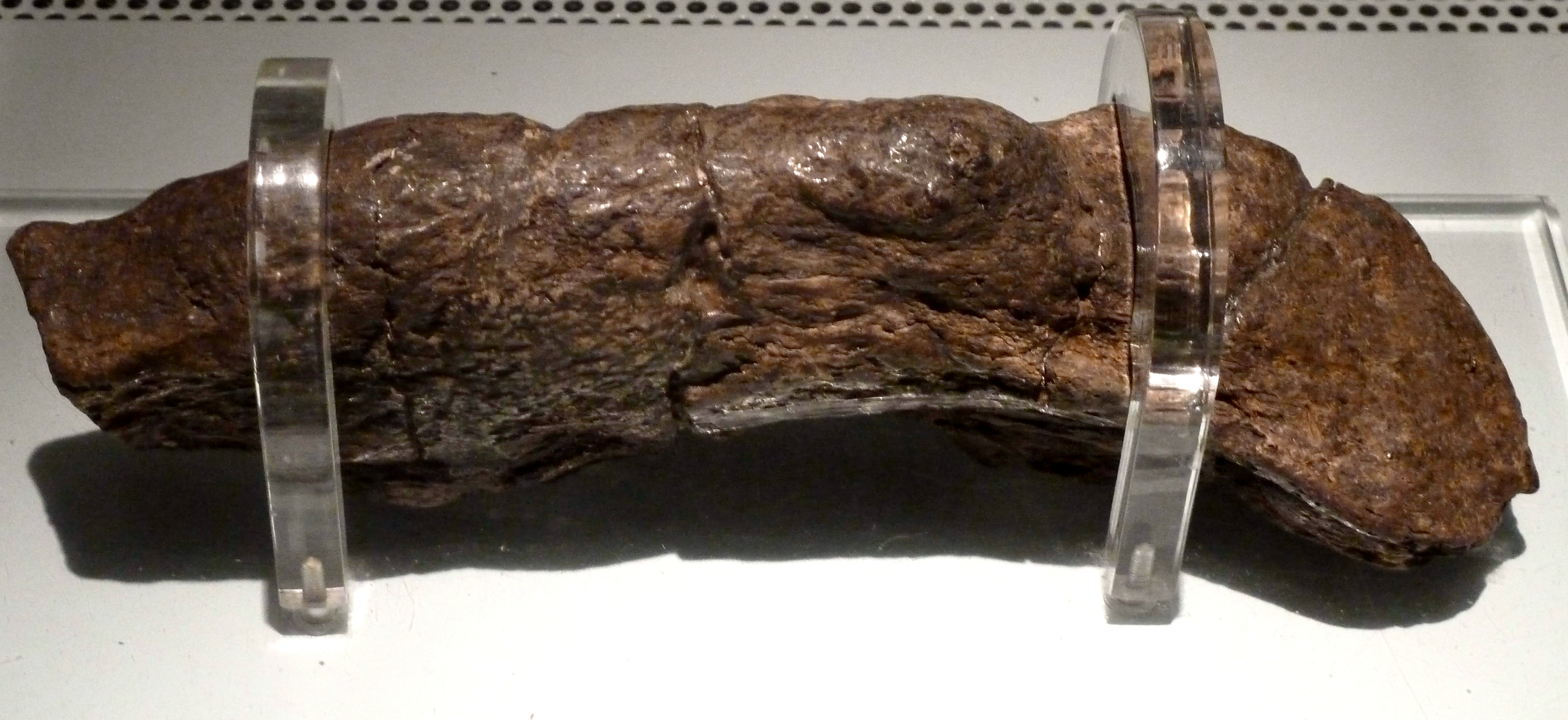
The 9th-century Viking Lloyds Bank coprolite, now at Jorvik Viking Centre, York

In archaeology, a biofact (or ecofact) is any organic material including flora or fauna material found at an archaeological site that has not been technologically altered by humans yet still has cultural relevance. Biofacts can include but are not limited to plants, seeds, pollen, animal bones, insects, fish bones and mollusks. The study of biofacts, alongside other archaeological remains such as artifacts are a key element to understanding how past societies interacted with their surrounding environment and with each other. Biofacts also play a role in helping archaeologists understand questions of subsistence and reveals information about the domestication of certain plant species and animals which demonstrates, for example, the transition from a hunter-gatherer society to a farming society.

Biofacts are differentiated from artifacts in that artifacts are typically considered anything purposefully manipulated or made by human art and workmanship, whereas ecofacts represent matter that has not been made or deliberately influenced by humans yet still has cultural relevance. Biofacts reveal how people respond to their surroundings.

There are many different ways that biofacts can be preserved, including through carbonisation, waterlogging, desiccation and mineralization. There are also varying methods of recovering them depending on the location in which they were found.

== Types ==
There are a large variety of biofacts that have the potential to give insight into how civilisations operated in the past. Plant remains are a common and key ecofact that provide an important source of information because they can be used to reconstruct the way past societies have interacted with their environment. By studying plant remains, especially those that were used in the economy and the changes in their use over time, researchers known as archaeobotanists can understand what changes occurred in activities such as cultivation, consumption and trade from the past. Due to their ability to reflect the environmental conditions of the past, plant remains are also used to be able to determine the increase or loss of biodiversity in the studied area and understand environmental factors such as the types of soil that were present during the studied time period.

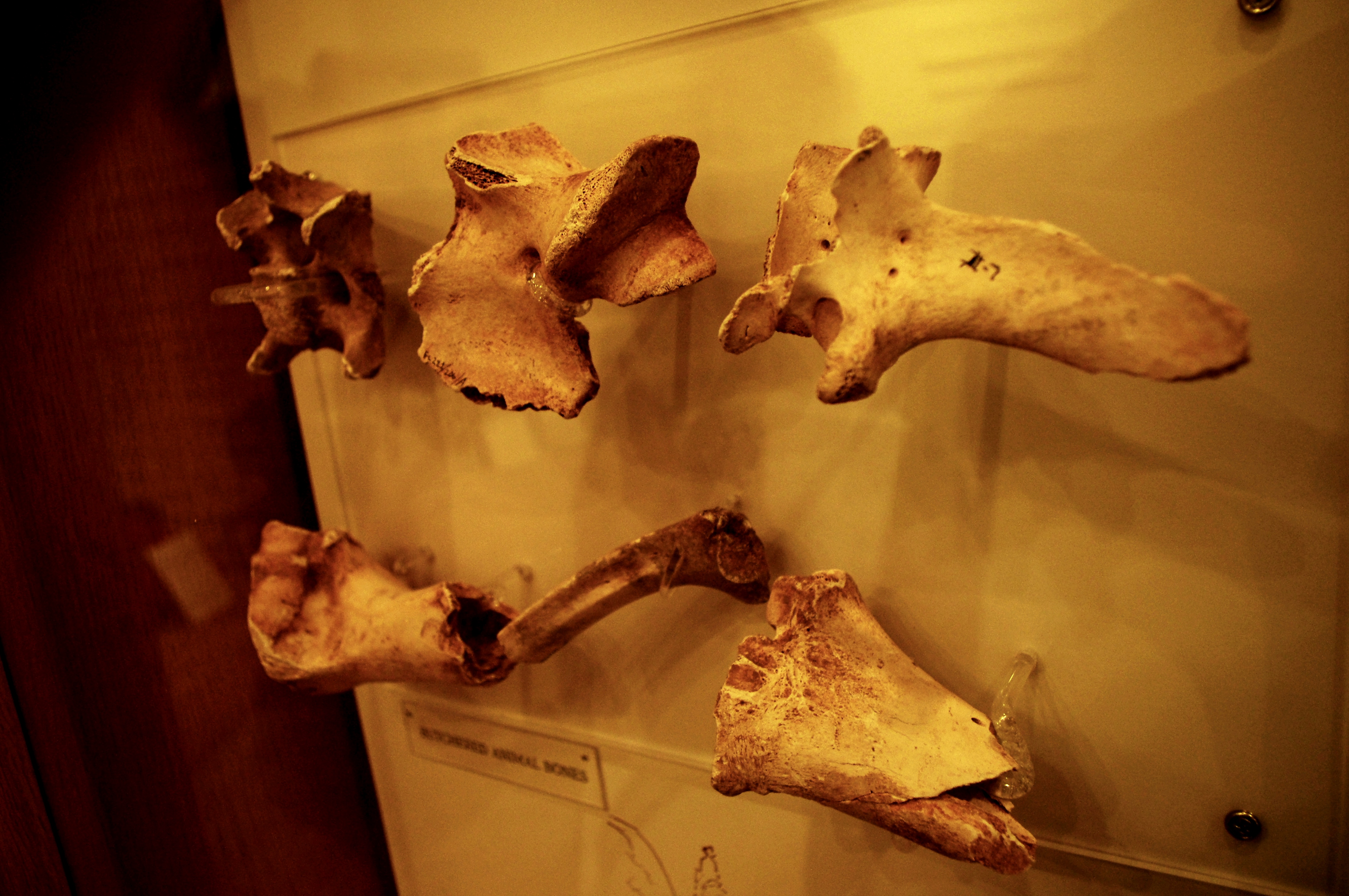
Bones of butchered animals uncovered during excavations at the Fort Loudoun site in Monroe County, Tennessee, United States, on display at the Fort Loudoun State Park museum.

Ecofacts include both flora and fauna that provide insight into the way humans interacted with their surroundings and as such, animal remains such as bones represent another type of ecofact. Animal remains have the potential to be both an ecofact and artifact and their classification is dependent on the context in which they may have been used. If not deliberately altered, animal remains can be classified as an ecofact, and can often reveal the dietary habits of a past group of people. After people would have eaten the edible parts of an animal, inedible parts were disposed of into pits and flat layers of garbage known as sheet middens. Another method of analysing the animal remains is to investigate the techniques and methods of butchering that would have been used on the ecofact. For example, if the faunal remains appear to have been butchered or sawn by hand, it is possible to link the remains to the 19th and early 20th century where this method of butchering animals for food was common. The size of the ecofact can also reveal information as to whether the food was locally grown or imported.

Zooarchaeology which is the study of animal remains from archaeological sites is able to provide insight into the diet of both humans and animals, resource use, the economy, climate, technological adaptations, human demography, urbanisation and a wide variety of information about how humans operated within their environment.

Seeds represent another ecofact that are commonly found at archaeological sites due to their large population. Seeds can be studied to reveal elements of the past such as the dietary patterns or clothing of a past civilisation. They are often preserved and able to be studied due to accidents in the processing of seeds or burning of debris or stored materials.

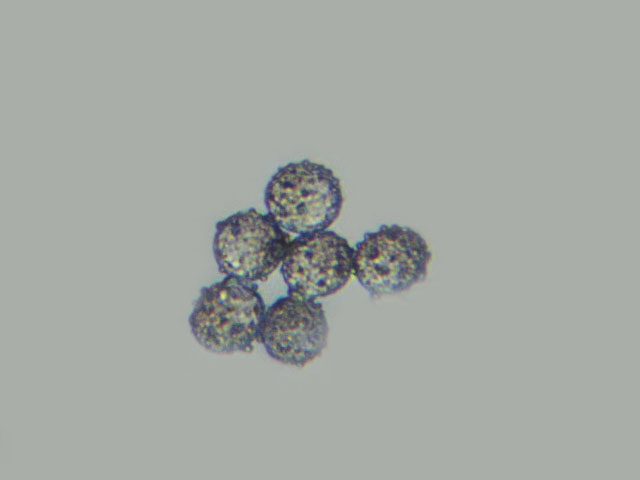
Compound microscope image of pollen using x10 objective & 3.5 MP USB Camera in minor bright-field under coverslip

Charcoal is another form of ecofact that is one of the most common plant material recovered from archaeology sites yet one of the least analysed. Charcoal is defined as the charred remains of a plant's wooden structures and is predominately derived from bushes and trees. Charcoal is frequently utilised for radiocarbon dating but also serves a purpose as it provides evidence of how a past civilisation selected and used different forms of wood at an archaeology site, and also gives insight into ancient forms of vegetation and the surrounding environment.

Pollen is another ecofact found at archaeology sites where Palynology which is the study of pollen/dust can be used to reveal information about the site environment, the identity of plants used and also be used to reveal whether plants were wild or domesticated.

== Preservation ==
As a piece of organic material, ecofacts are subject to decay over time as they break down into simpler organic or inorganic matter such as water, carbon dioxide and nitrogen. Therefore, there a particular environmental conditions that must occur in order for ecofacts to be adequately preserved in the archaeological record. The four main types of preservation for organic matter such as ecofacts are carbonization, waterlogging, desiccation and mineralization.

=== Charring/carbonisation ===
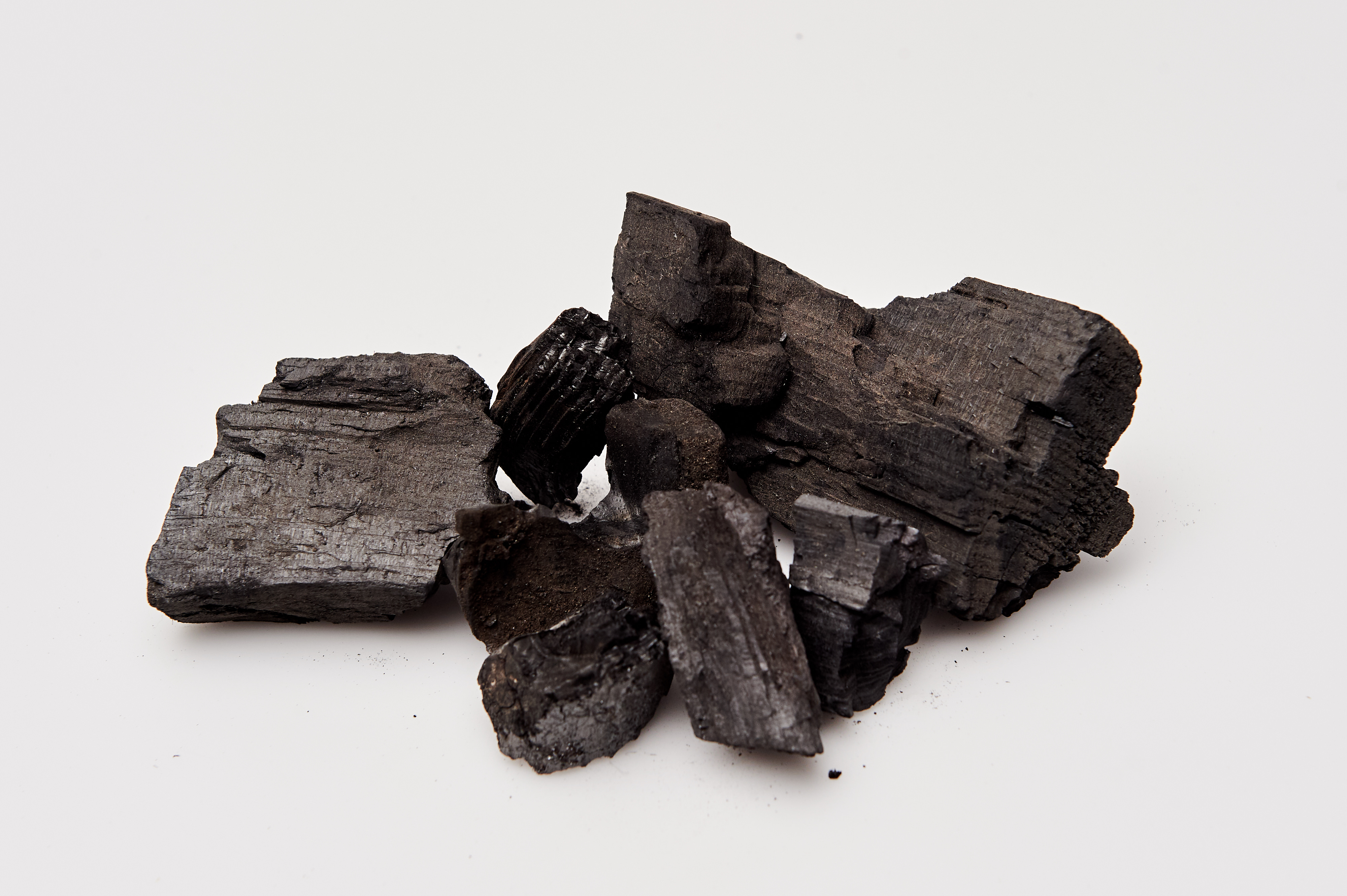
Charcoal is a fuel obtained by the slow and incomplete combustion of wood.

Charred remains are the most frequently occurring source of organic material found in archaeological excavations that provide useful information for analysis. Carbonization occurs when the organic matter is exposed to high temperatures, most frequently as a result of fires. The heat outputted converts the plant's organic compounds into charcoal, and as the bacteria that is responsible for the decay of organic material cannot affect charcoal, carbonized ecofacts are able to survive in most environments. Plant remains are the most common ecofact that are preserved through the method of carbonisation as it is likely for these remains to have been charred whilst being used as a means of fuel or as their preparation often involved the use of fire. Other ecofacts when slowly charred, such as wood, seeds and nuts can also retain the majority of their morphological and anatomical features, allowing for further study.

=== Waterlogging ===
Waterlogging is another form of preservation that occurs when an ecofact or similar archaeological deposit is preserved under the groundwater table, where a reduction in oxygen allows for preservation. Ecofacts found in most waterlogged archaeology sites are often well preserved yet delicate. To result in a high quality preservation, the groundwater level should remain consistent which ensures anaerobic conditions that ultimately prevent the decay of the organic matter. It is possible that both waterlogged and charred ecofacts can be found at the same archaeological site.

=== Desiccation ===
Desiccation is another type of preservation that only occurs in highly arid environments where there is a lack of water, such as a desert. Under these conditions, organic materials gain a resistance to high or low temperatures and UV exposure and retain their key biological structures such as their membranes, nucleic acids and proteins. Where an ecofact experiences this type of preservation, it is possible to rehydrate the tissue of the organism to cause it to resume physiological activity. Whilst rare, desiccation is another form of preservation that allows for the study of ecofacts.

=== Mineralization ===
Mineralized ecofacts require a specific set of conditions for correct preservation. Mineralization occurs when dissolved minerals replace the cellular structure of the ecofact or encase the ecofact in places such as caves, rock shelters or cesspits. The Roman latrines found at Sagalassos in Turkey are an example of mineralized ecofacts that have occurred due to the plant remains absorbing minerals that were present in the organic matter in which they were buried.

== Methods of recovery ==
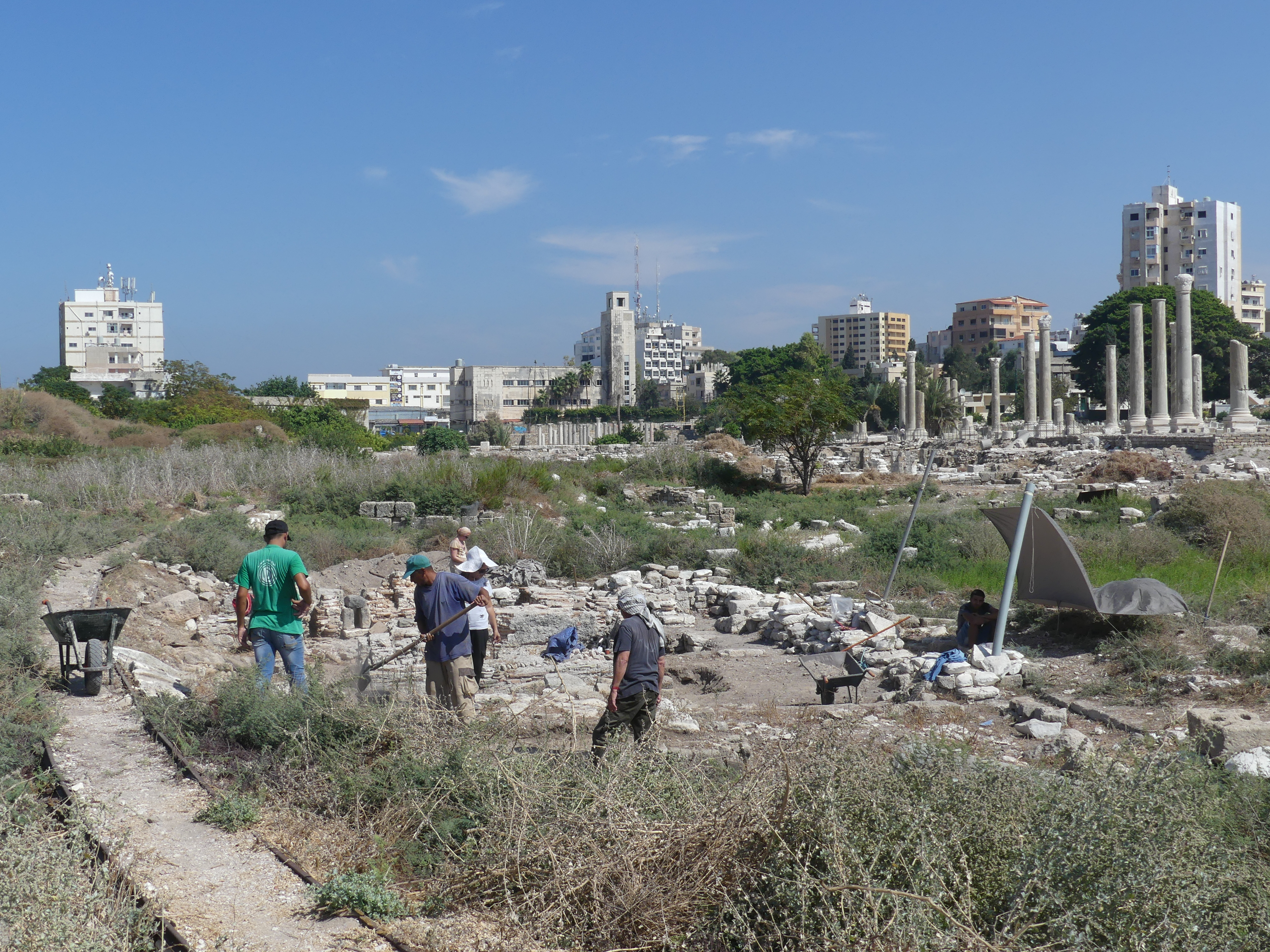
Excavations at the Al Mina / City Site in Tyre/Sour, Southern Lebanon, by an archaeological team of Professor Pierre-Louis Gatier from the University of Lyon

There are numerous methods of sampling methods that can be utilised to recover ecofacts from an archaeological site:

The most basic form of probabilistic sampling is a simple random sample in which quadrats within the archaeological site are chosen through a random number table to be sampled until a set number or percentage of areas are sampled.

Systematic random sampling is another method of recovering ecofacts and involves the site being sectioned out into a predetermined number of quadrats and from there, quadrats are randomly selection from within each section.

There is also stratified random sampling which involves the site being divided into its natural zones and then these zones selected through random numbers.

Judgemental sampling is another form of recovering ecofacts that has a large degree of bias. In this method, samples are selected by a researcher looking at all elements within the archaeological site and deciding whether to sample from certain areas whilst excluding others.

== See also ==
- Biofact (biology)
- Biofact (philosophy)
