= Āraiši lake fortress =

Archaeological site in Cēsis, Latvia

Coordinates: 57°15′5″N 25°16′58″E

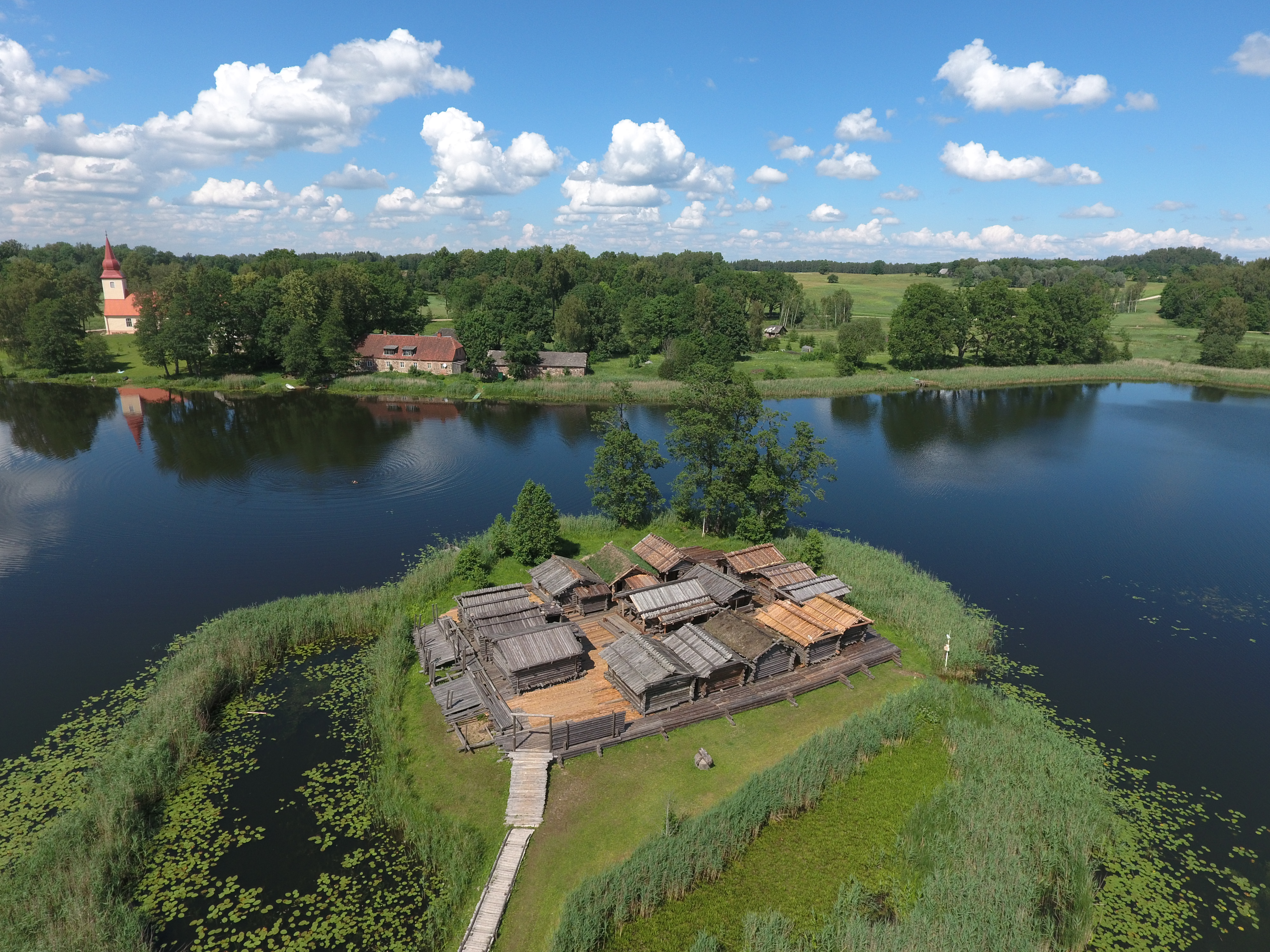
The Āraiši lake fortress

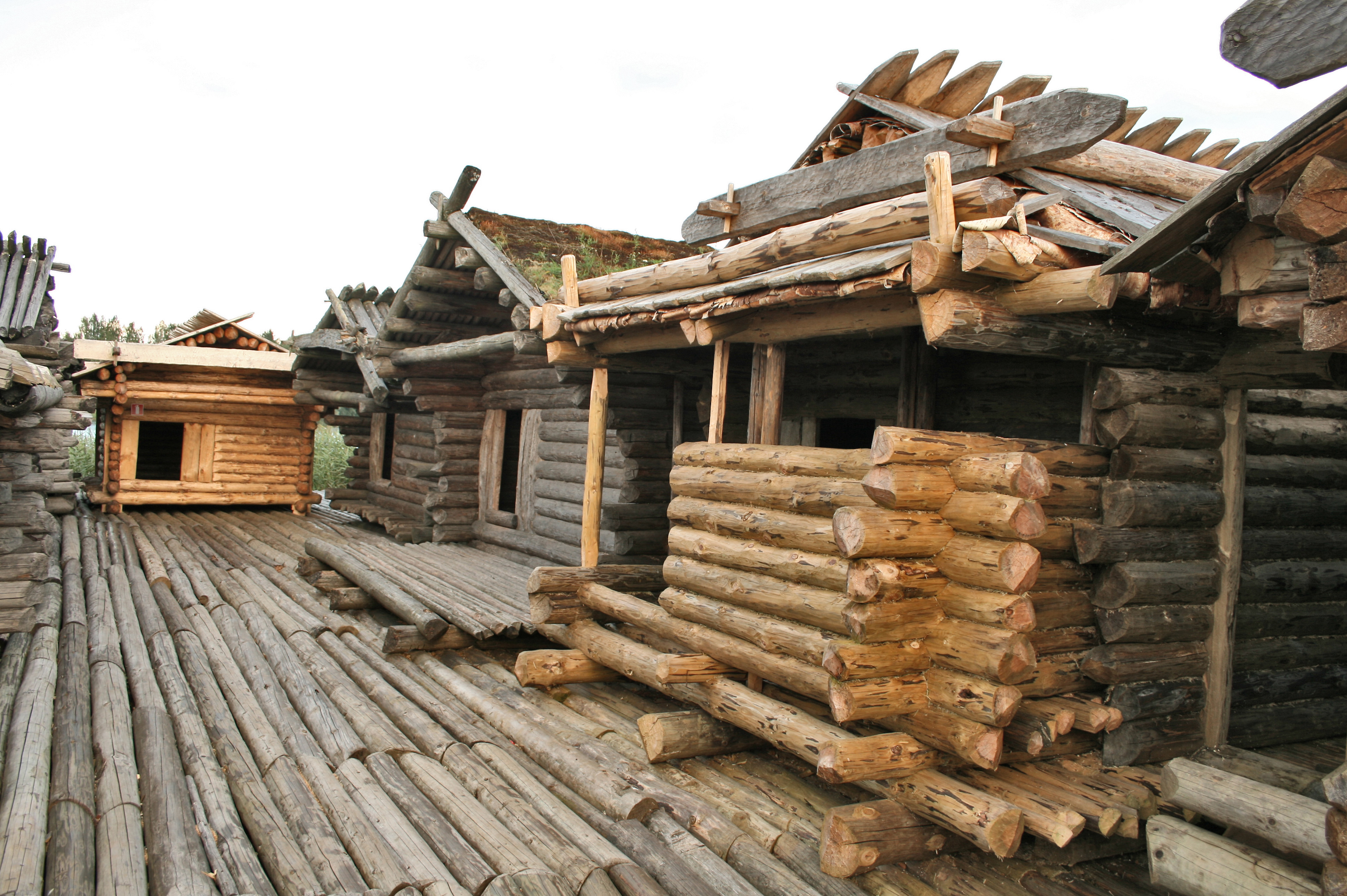
Some of the restored buildings

Āraiši lake fortress (Latvian: Āraišu ezerpils) is an archeological museum with original and reconstructed remnants of Latvian prehistory. It is a unique nationally important archaeological site with remains of the 9th–10th centuries Latgalian lake fortress.

== Features ==
Today the lake fortress is partially reconstructed and visitors can see rebuilt prehistoric Latgalian wooden buildings.

During the excavations, remains of 151 wooden buildings were discovered, with 3700 artifacts and about a hundred thousand fragments of pottery.

Using collected data, ethnographic parallels and replicas of ancient tools, today there are 14 reconstructed buildings of the first period of the construction of the fortified settlement.

Āraiši archaeological museum park is a member of the EXARC organization of open-air archaeological museums throughout Europe.

== See also ==
- Latgalians
