= Günter Ropohl =

German philosopher of technology

Günter Ropohl (14 June 1939 in Cologne, Germany – 28 January 2017) was a German philosopher of technology.

== Biography ==
Günter Ropohl studied mechanical engineering and philosophy at the University of Stuttgart, where he was a scholar of the philosopher Max Bense. After his PhD (Dr.-Ing.) in 1970, he wrote his Habilitation thesis in Philosophy and Sociology at the University of Karlsruhe (TH) in 1978 under the supervision of Hans Lenk. His work dealt with the systems theory of "Technik" (engl. technique), leading to the concept of general technology. In 1979, Ropohl became professor at the University of Karlsruhe (TH). Soon after, in 1981, he became professor for Allgemeine Technologie (general technology) and philosophy of technology at the Goethe University Frankfurt, Germany (until 2004). In the 1980s, he visited his colleague and friend Carl Mitcham in the United States. From 1983 to 1991, i.e., during the period of the Cold War, he was course director and visiting lecturer at the Inter-University Centre Dubrovnik (Croatia). In 1988, he was invited as visiting professor at the Rochester Institute of Technology, Rochester NY. Ropohl was an honorary member of the German Engineering Association (VDI), due to his interdisciplinary engagement for the philosophy of technology. He was co-editor of an anthology of the classics in the philosophy of technology in a Continental-European tradition. Ropohl published 15 monographs, (co-)edited another 15 books and published more than 180 articles. He died on 28 January 2017 at the age of 77.

== Philosophy ==
A central concept in his work was sociotechnical systems, i.e. he regarded techniques as societal structures. Ropohl was a critic of the systems theory of Niklas Luhmann and voted for the recognition of material culture. His definition of (German) "Technik" included a) the utility, b) artificiality and c) functionality. In the focus of his work is the combination of technique as artefact and action, whereas knowledge insinuates the meta-concept of technology. Therefore, he differentiated between engineering sciences and technical sciences.

Ropohl was well known in the German-speaking academia for his writings on the concepts of Technik and Technologie, the ethics of technology, technology assessment, professional ethics for engineers and on the societal need for educating towards technology literacy.

He received a Festschrift with contributions from academic scholars, focusing on his work and related discourses, both on his 65th and 75th birthday (edited by Nicole C. Karafyllis, see literature), including a complete list of his publications from the late 1960s to 2014.

== Selected publications in English ==
- Article on systems-theoretical approaches and morphological methods in forecasting, in; Technological Forecastings in Practice, Farnborough/Lexington, MA: Saxon Jouse 1973, pp. 29–38.
- Article in Research in Philosophy and Technology, Vol. 2, ed. P. T. Durbin, Greenwich, CT: Jai Press 1979, pp. 15–52.
- "Information doesn't make sense", in Carl Mitcham and Alois Huning (Eds.): Philosophy and Technology II: Information Technology and Computers in Theory and Practice, Dordrecht/Boston MA 1986, pp. 63–74.
- "Deficiencies in Engineering Education", in P. T. Durbin (Ed.), Critical Perspectives on Nonacademic Science and Engineering, Bethlehem, PA: Lehigh University Press and London/Toronto: Associated University Presses 1991, pp. 278–295.
- "Knowledge Types in Technology", in: M.J. de Vries & A. Tamir (Eds.), Shaping Concepts of Technology. From Philosophical Perspective to Mental Images, Dordrecht 1997.
- "Technological enlightenment as a continuation of modern thinking", in Carl Mitcham (Ed.): Research in philosophy and technology, vol. 17, Technology, ethics and culture, Creenwich CT/London: Jai Press 1998, pp. 239–248.
- Philosophy of socio-technical systems, in: Society for Philosophy and Technology, Spring 1999, Volume 4, Number 3, 1999.
- "Mixed prospects of engineering ethics". European Journal of Engineering Education, 27 (2) (2002), pp. 149–155.

== Monographs in German ==
- Flexible Fertigungssysteme : zur Automatisierung der Serienfertigung. Mainz: Krausskopf 1971 (= Produktionstechnik heute 1, ed. H. J. Warnecke; dissertation Universität Stuttgart 1970)
- Eine Systemtheorie der Technik : zur Grundlegung der Allgemeinen Technologie. München/Wien: Hanser 1979 (Habilitationsschrift Universität Karlsruhe 1978). 2nd ed. 1999, 3rd ed. Karlsruhe 2009.
- Die unvollkommene Technik. Frankfurt/M: Suhrkamp 1985
- Technologische Aufklärung : Beiträge zur Technikphilosophie. Frankfurt/M: Suhrkamp 1991, 2nd ed. 1999
- Ethik und Technikbewertung. Frankfurt/M: Suhrkamp 1996
- Wie die Technik zur Vernunft kommt : Beiträge zum Paradigmenwechsel in den Technikwissenschaften. Amsterdam: G+B Fakultas 1998
- Vom Wert der Technik. Stuttgart: Kreuz Verlag 2003
- Sinnbausteine : Ein weltlicher Katechismus. Leipzig: Reclam 2003
- Arbeits- und Techniklehre : Philosophische Beiträge zur technologischen Bildung. Berlin: Edition Sigma 2004
- Kleinzeug : Satiren – Limericks – Aphorismen. Münster: LIT Verlag 2004
- Allgemeine Technologie : Eine Systemtheorie der Technik. 3rd ed. of the 1979 book, Karlsruhe: Universitätsverlag 2009; http://digbib.ubka.uni-karlsruhe.de/volltexte/1000011529
- Signaturen der technischen Welt : Neue Beiträge zur Technikphilosophie, Berlin/Münster: LIT Verlag 2009
- Besorgnisgesellschaft, Berlin: Parodos 2014

== Books about his work ==
- Karl Eugen Kurrer: The history of the theory of structures, Ernst & Sohn 2008, pp. 148–152.
- Nicole C. Karafyllis/Tilmann Haar (Eds.): Technikphilosophie im Aufbruch. Festschrift für Günter Ropohl. Berlin: Edition Sigma, 2004 (in German; includes a complete list of his publications from the late 1960s to 2004).
- Nicole C. Karafyllis (Ed.): Das Leben führen? Lebensführung zwischen Technikphilosophie und Lebensphilosophie. Für Günter Ropohl zum 75. Geburtstag. Berlin: Edition sigma, 2014 (in German, Festschrift for Ropohl's 75th birthday; continues in the appendix the list of publications 2004-2014)
- Elisabeth Gräb-Schmidt: Technikethik und ihre Fundamente. Dargestellt in Auseinandersetzung mit den technikethischen Ansätzen von Günter Ropohl und Walter Zimmerli. De Gruyter 2002.
- Friedrich Rapp: "Philosophy of Technology after twenty years: A German perspective", Society for Philosophy and Technology, 1995.
