= Waterlogging (archaeology) =

Long-term exclusion of air by groundwater creating an anaerobic environment

In archaeology, waterlogging is the long-term exclusion of air by groundwater, which creates an anaerobic environment that can preserve artifacts perfectly. Such waterlogging preserves perishable artifacts. Thus, in a site which has been waterlogged since the archaeological horizon was deposited, exceptional insight may be obtained by study of artifacts made of leather, wood, textile or similar materials. 75-90% of the archaeological remains at wetland sites are found to be organic material. Tree rings found from logs that have been preserved allow archaeologists to accurately date sites. Wetland sites include all those found in lakes, swamps, marshes, fens, and peat bogs.

Peat bogs, nearly all of which occur in northern latitudes, are some of the most important environments for wetland archaeology. Peat bogs have likewise preserved many wooden trackways, including the world's oldest road, which is a 6,000-year-old one-mile stretch of track.

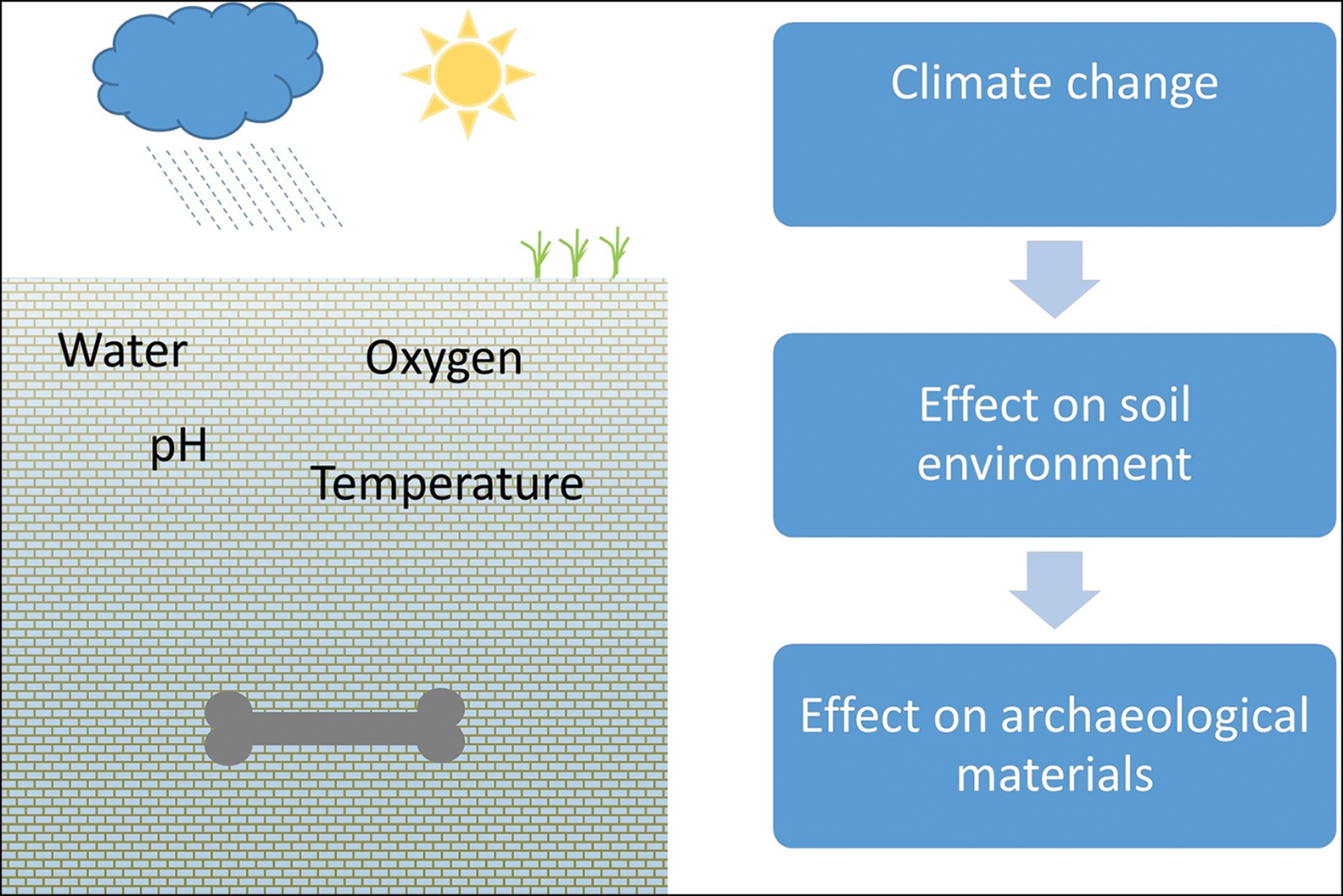
The impact of climate change on archaeological deposits.

Bog bodies are the best-known finds from the peat bogs of northwest Europe, with most of them dating from the Iron Age. Most corpses that were found were individuals that met a violent death and were probably either executed as criminals or killed as a sacrifice before thrown into the bog. For example, the Old Croghan Man was stabbed, decapitated, mutilated, and tied down to the bottom of a bog pool. His body is an amazing display of how splendidly waterlogging can preserve a body, as his hands, skin, fingernails, and stomach were amazingly intact. Another example of a waterlogging artifact or mummy was Ötzi, found by two tourists near the border of Austria and Italy. Ötzi is now displayed in Bolzano, Italy, in the South Tyrol Museum of Archaeology.

Occasionally, waterlogged conditions can occur inside burial mounds. The oak-coffin burials of Bronze Age northern Europe, and most notably those of Denmark, date to about 1000 BC. These coffins had an inner core of stones packed round the tree-trunk coffin, with a round barrow built above. Water then infiltrated the inside of the mound and by combining with tannin exuding from the tree trunks, set up acidic conditions which destroyed the skeleton but preserved the skin, hair, ligaments, and clothing of the individuals.

Perhaps the most interesting wetland archaeological find was the Ozette site. In 1750, a huge mudslide buried a whale-hunting settlement on the coast of Washington, which protected the organic artifacts from the oxygen that would lead to their deterioration. Over 50,000 artifacts were found in a fine state of preservation, with almost half of them being wood or plant material. The most fascinating thing they found was a meter-high block of cedar that was carved in the shape of a whale's dorsal fin.

The major archaeological problem with waterlogged finds, particularly wood, is that they deteriorate rapidly when they are uncovered, beginning to dry and crack almost at once. They therefore need to be kept wet until treated in a laboratory. Conservation measures explain why wet archaeology costs around four times as much as dry archaeology.

== See also ==
- Wetland settlement
