= Lake fortress =

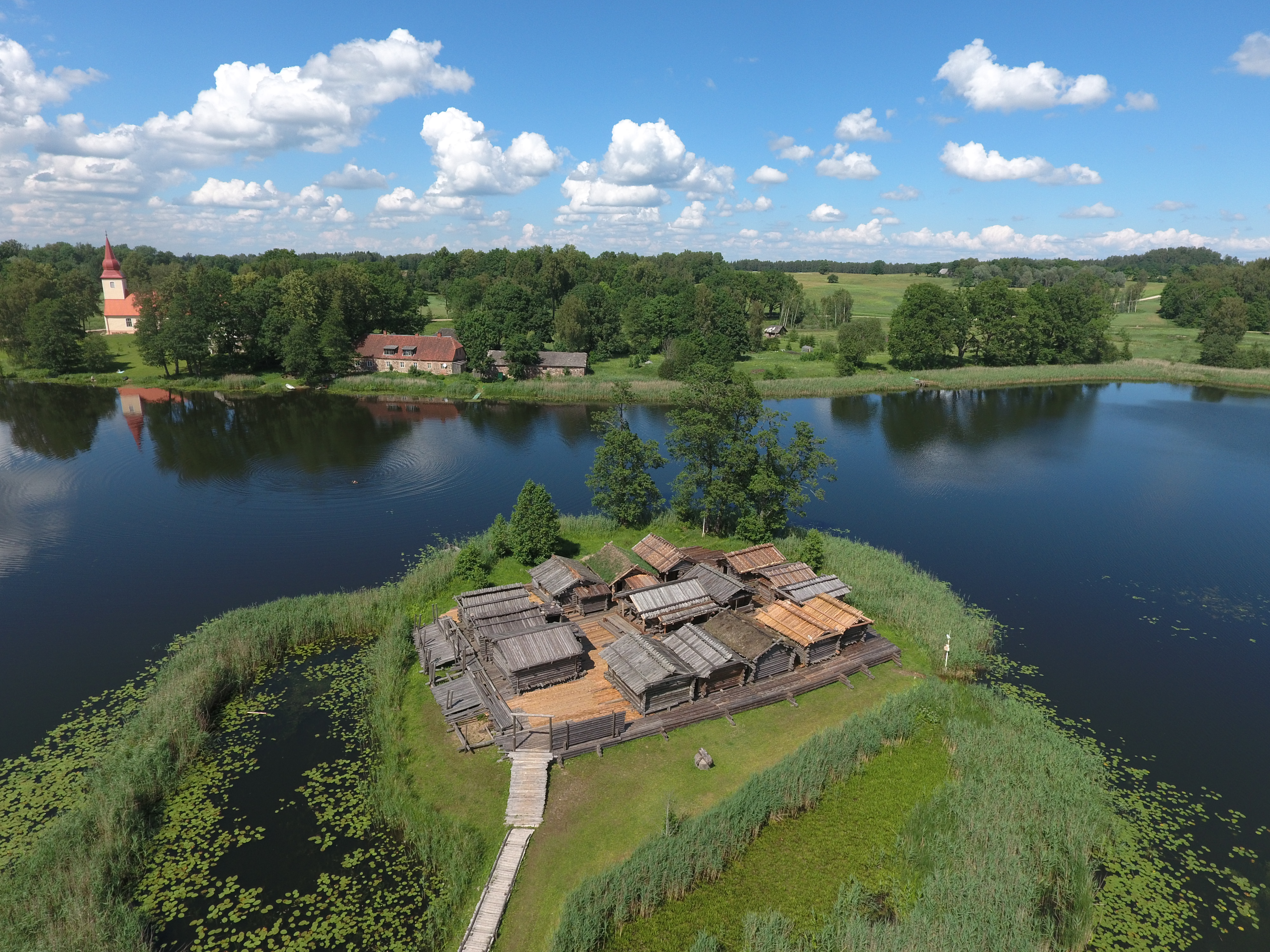
Āraiši lake fortress

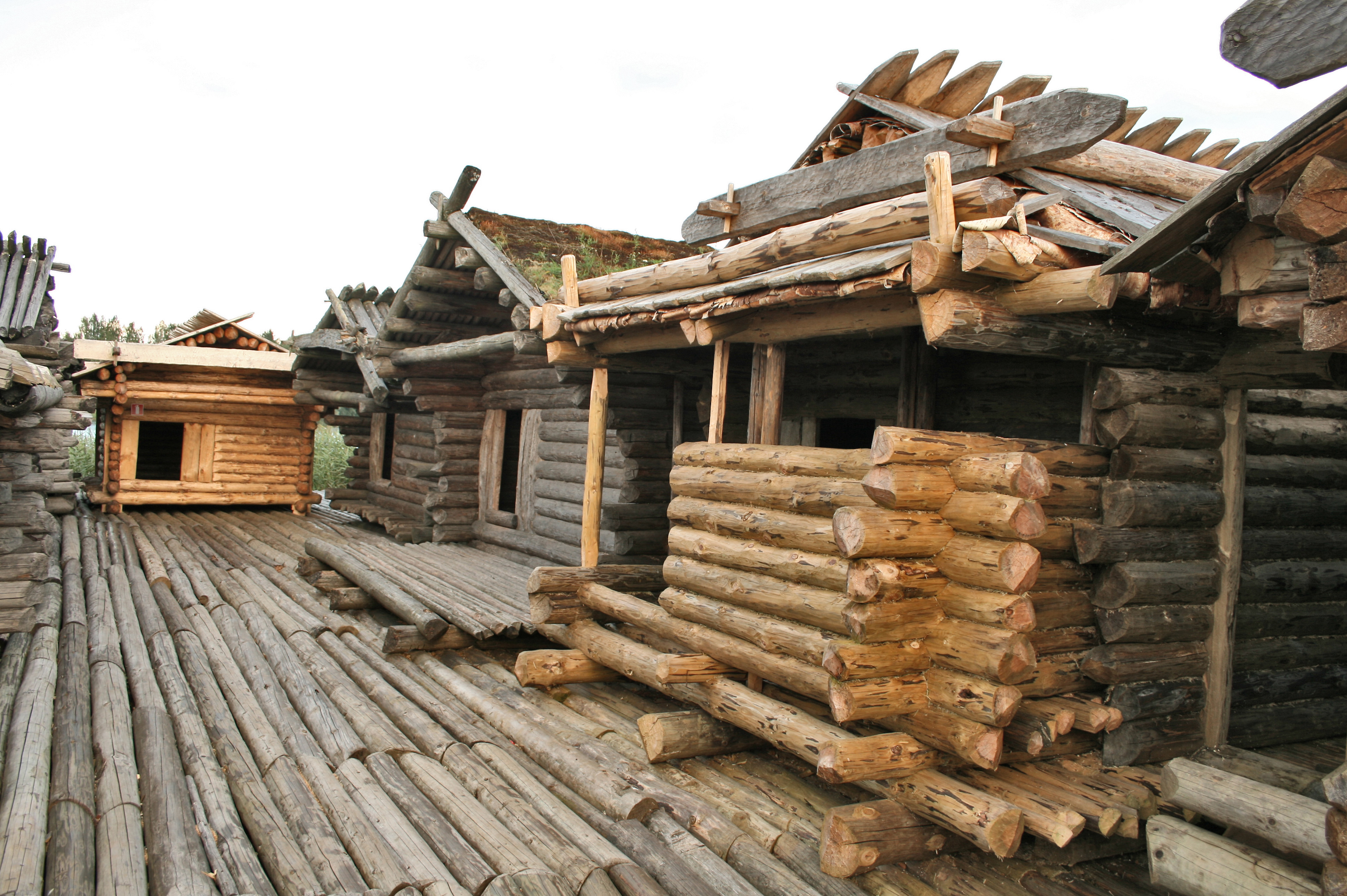
Some of the restored buildings

Lake fortress (Ezerpils, "lakefort") is a type of fortified wetland settlements mostly built on wooden platforms on lakes of Latvia build during 7th-11th centuries in the lands of Latgalians. All known sites are underwater. The best known one (and the first discovered one of this type) is the reconstructed Āraiši lake fortress (Latvian: Āraišu ezerpils) on the Āraiši Lake.

== History ==
It has been long known that in a number of lakes in Vidzeme one can see sunk dwellings. There are folk tales about settlements sunk when flying lakes descended onto them. The first exploration of an ezerpils was carried out in the Āraiši lake by Carl Georg von Sievers, a Livonian landowner and archaeologist of German-Baltic descent in 1876.

During 1959-1965 and 1967 expeditions organized by the Department of Archaeology and Anthropology of the Institute of History of the Academy of Sciences of the Latvian SSR carried out systematic investigation of underwater sites in 103 lakes, 15 swamps, and 3 rivers, and similar sites was found in a number of other lakes. It was then realized that a new category of archaeological sites was discovered in Latvia. Most of the settlements were completely under water, only some were somewhat surfacing a during dry summers.

A similar sunken settlement is known in Estonia, the Koorküla Valgjärv lake settlement by the Koorküla Valgjärv lake.
