= Nicole C. Karafyllis =

German philosopher and biologist (born 1970)

Nicole C. Karafyllis (born 22 April 1970 in Lüdinghausen, West Germany) is a German philosopher and biologist. As of 2010, she has been a Professor of Philosophy at the TU Braunschweig, Braunschweig/Brunswick Institute of Technology (Germany).

== Biography ==
Karafyllis was born in Germany to a German mother and a Greek father. From 1989 to 1994, she studied biology and philosophy at the Universities of Erlangen and Tübingen. She was awarded her doctorate in theoretical biology from the International Center for Ethics in the Sciences and Humanities at the University of Tübingen in 1999. Her Habilitation in philosophy was completed at the University of Stuttgart in 2006, dealing with the topic Phenomenology of Growth. Philosophy and scientific History of productive Life between Nature and Technology. For ten years, 1998–2008, she has been working at the Goethe University, Frankfurt am Main, Germany and was a scholar of Günter Ropohl.

In 2007, she has been a Visiting Professor for Applied Philosophy of Science at Vienna University (Austria). From 2008 until 2010, she moved to the United Arab Emirates and was Full Professor of Philosophy at the United Arab Emirates University (UAEU). In fall 2010, she was senior research fellow of the International Centre for Cultural Studies (IFK) in Vienna (Austria). She returned to Germany in summer 2010 to become Department Chair of the Philosophy Department at Technische Universität Braunschweig.

Karafyllis' areas of specialization are philosophy of science, philosophy of technology, phenomenology, environmental ethics and history of philosophy. In her focus on early 20th century German philosophy she deals with the intersection of biography and biology which was known as the realm of Lebensphilosophie (Philosophy of Life). Famous protagonists were Friedrich Nietzsche, Wilhelm Dilthey and Georg Simmel. Karafyllis also works on philosophers in Nazi Germany.

Her 2013 book entitled "Cleaning as Passion" (German orig. Putzen als Passion) became a non-fiction bestseller in Germany.

== Philosophy ==
Karafyllis is engaged in a cultural philosophy of science and technology, making use of a history of ideas perspective without compromising the idea of manual and material culture. She is particularly known for her philosophical works on the modeling interfaces between biology and technology (the concept of biofact), and for her union of phenomenology and philosophy of technology.

Constructing life and cultivation and purification technologies are among her main interests. She is an expert in the philosophy of plant life and of biobanking. With María Antonia González Valerio (from UNAM), she co-edited and commented the first anthology with techno-philosophical writings of Mexican philosopher José Gaos.

== Selected publications ==
=== Books (in English) ===
- Claus Zittel, Romano Nanni, Gisela Engel and Nicole C. Karafyllis (ed.) (2008): Philosophies of Technology: Francis Bacon and his Contemporaries. Leiden: Brill Publ., Nov. 2008
- Karafyllis, N.C. and G. Ulshöfer (ed.) (2008). Sexualized Brains. Scientific Modeling of Emotional Intelligence from a Cultural Perspective. Cambridge, MA: MIT Press, Oct. 2008
- with Ortwin Renn, Alexander Hohlt and Dorothea Taube (Eds.): International Science and Technology Education: Exploring Culture, Economy, and Social Perceptions, Routledge 2015
- with Jörg Overmann, Christoph Mackert and Ulrich Johannes Schneider:. Leipzig 2023 (open access)

=== Books (in German) ===
- Karafyllis, N.C. (2000). Nachwachsende Rohstoffe – Technikbewertung zwischen den Leitbildern Wachstum und Nachhaltigkeit. Opladen: Leske+Budrich. (PhD-thesis) Awarded with the Franzke-Prize for Technology and Responsibility of the TU Berlin 2001.
- Karafyllis, N.C. (2001). Biologisch, natürlich, nachhaltig. Philosophische Aspekte des Naturzugangs im 21. Jahrhundert. Tübingen/Basel: A. Francke.
- Karafyllis, N.C. and Schmidt, J.C. [eds.] (2002). Zugänge zur Rationalität der Zukunft. Stuttgart/Weimar: Metzler.
- Karafyllis, N.C. [ed.] (2003). Biofakte. Versuch über den Menschen zwischen Artefakt und Lebewesen. Paderborn: Mentis.
- Karafyllis, N.C., Krohmer, T., Schirrmeister, A., Söll, Ä. and Wilkens, A. [ed.] (2004). De-Marginalisierungen. Berlin: trafo.
- Karafyllis, N.C. und Haar, T. [ed.] (2004). Technikphilosophie im Aufbruch. Festschrift für Günter Ropohl. Berlin: edition sigma.
- Engel, G. and Karafyllis, N.C. [ed.]. (2004) Technik in der Frühen Neuzeit – Schrittmacher der europäischen Moderne. Themenband der Zeitschrift Zeitsprünge. Forschungen zur Frühen Neuzeit, 8. Jg., Frankfurt am Main: Vittorio Klostermann.
- Engel, G. and Karafyllis, N.C. [ed.] (2005). Re-Produktionen. Berlin: trafo
- Guest-Ed. of the Special Issue Technik of Zeitschrift für Kulturphilosophie, 2/2013 (Hamburg: Meiner), including a German translation of a text of philosopher Don Ihde and a document of Hans Blumenberg.
- Karafyllis, N. C. (2013): Putzen als Passion. Ein philosophischer Universalreiniger für klare Verhältnisse. Berlin: Kulturverlag Kadmos, 2nd. ed. 2015, Kindle Edition March 2014
- Karafyllis, N. C. [ed.] (2014): Das Leben führen? Lebensführung zwischen Technikphilosophie und Lebensphilosophie. Berlin: edition sigma
- Karafyllis, N. C. (2015): Willy Moog (1888–1935): Ein Philosophenleben. Freiburg: Alber (2nd. ed. 2016) ISBN 978-3495486979
- Kirchhoff, Thomas; Karafyllis, N. C. et al. [eds.] (2017): Naturphilosophie. Ein Lehr- und Studienbuch. Tübingen: Mohr-Siebeck (UTB)
- Zachmann, Karin and Karafyllis, N. C. [eds.] (2017): Pflanzliche Biofakte. Geschichten über die Technisierung der Agrikultur im 20. Jahrhundert. Special Issue of the Journal Technikgeschichte, vol. 84, nr. 2 ISSN 0040-117X
- Karafyllis, N. C. (2018): Theorien der Lebendsammlung. Pflanzen, Mikroben und Tiere als Biofakte in Genbanken. Freiburg: Alber ISBN 978-3-495-48975-8

Karafyllis is co-editor of the book series PHYSIS on Naturphilosophie/Philosophy of Nature at the German publishing house of Karl Alber in Freiburg.

=== Articles in English ===
- Karafyllis, N.C. (2002). Biotechnology – the offspring of life science or techno science? Newsletter of the European Society of Agricultural and Food Ethics (EURSAFE) (4), No. 2.
- Karafyllis, N.C. (2003). Renewable resources and the idea of nature – what has biotechnology got to do with it? Journal of Agricultural and Environmental Ethics. Vol. 16 (1) 2003, pp. 3–28.
- Karafyllis, N.C. (2007). Growth of Biofacts: The real thing or metaphor? In: R. Heil, A. Kaminski et al. (ed.) Tensions. Technological and Aesthetic (Trans)Formations of Society. Bielefeld: transcript publishers, pp. 141–152.
- Karafyllis, N.C. (2008). Endogenous Design of Biofacts. Tissues and Networks in Bio Art and Life Science. In: sk-interfaces. Exploding borders – creating membranes in art, technology and society. Ed. by Jens Hauser. Liverpool: University of Liverpool Press, pp. 42–58.
- Karafyllis, N. C. (2008). Ethical and epistemological problems of hybridizing living beings: Biofacts and Body Shopping. In: Wenchao Li and Hans Poser (Ed.): Ethical Considerations on Today's Science and Technology. A German-Chinese Approach. Münster: LIT (2008), pp. 185–198.
- Karafyllis, N. C., and Ulshöfer, G. (2008). Intelligent Emotions and Sexualized Brains: Scientific Models, Discourses, and their interdependencies. In: N. C. Karafyllis/G. Ulshöfer (Ed.): Sexualized Brains. Scientific Modeling of Emotional Intelligence from a Cultural Perspective. Cambridge, Mass.: MIT Press, pp. 1–49.
- Karafyllis, N. C. (2009). Facts or Fiction? Methodological and Ethical Problems of Vision Assessment. In: M. Paul Sollie/Marcus Düwell (ed.): Evaluating New Technologies. Methodological Problems for the Ethical Assessment of Technologic Developments. Library of Ethics and Applied Philosophy. Berlin/New York. Springer, pp. 93–116.
- Karafyllis, N. C. (2011). The virtuous autist. Why neuroelitism does not work for the common good. In: Mariacarla Gadebusch Bondio, Andrea Bettels (Eds.): Im Korsett der Tugenden / In the Corset of Virtues. Hildesheim: Georg Olms Verlag
- Karafyllis, N. C. (2013): Short articles on the philosophy of technology of Andrew Feenberg, Richard Sennett, Norbert Wiener (co-authored with Christoph Hubig) and José Ortega y Gasset (co-authored with Hans Poser) in: Ch. Hubig, A. Huning, G. Ropohl [ed.]: Nachdenken über Technik: Die Klassiker der Technikphilosophie und neuere Entwicklungen. 3rd ed., Baden-Baden: Nomos.
- Karafyllis, N. C. (2015). Why 'technology' is not universal: philosophical remarks on the language and culture issue of STEM education. In Ortwin Renn, Nicole C. Karafyllis, Alexander Hohlt and Dorothea Taube (Eds.): International Science and Technology Education: Exploring Culture, Economy, and Social Perceptions, London: Routledge (Science in Society), pp. 3–18
- Karafyllis, N. C. (2015). Tertiary education in the GCC countries (UAE, Qatar, Saudi Arabia): how economy, gender and culture affect the field of STEM. In Ortwin Renn, Nicole C. Karafyllis, Alexander Hohlt and Dorothea Taube (Eds.): International Science and Technology Education: Exploring Culture, Economy, and Social Perceptions, London: Routledge (Science in Society), pp. 112–133
- Karafyllis, N. C. (2018). "Hey Plants, take a Walk on the Wild Side!" Ethics of Seeds and Seed Banks. In Angela Kallhoff, Marcello DiPaola, Maria Schörgenhumer [Eds.]: Plant Ethics. Concepts and Applications. London: Routledge (Routledge Environmental Humanities); ISBN 978-1-13-807921-2
- Karafyllis, N. C. (2020). Biofacts, Bioprospecting, Biobanking: A Reality Check of Seed Banks, in: Sabine Maasen, Sascha Dickel and Ch. Schneider (eds.): TechnoScienceSocieties, Springer Nature, pp. 131-156
