= Flat grave =

Type of burial

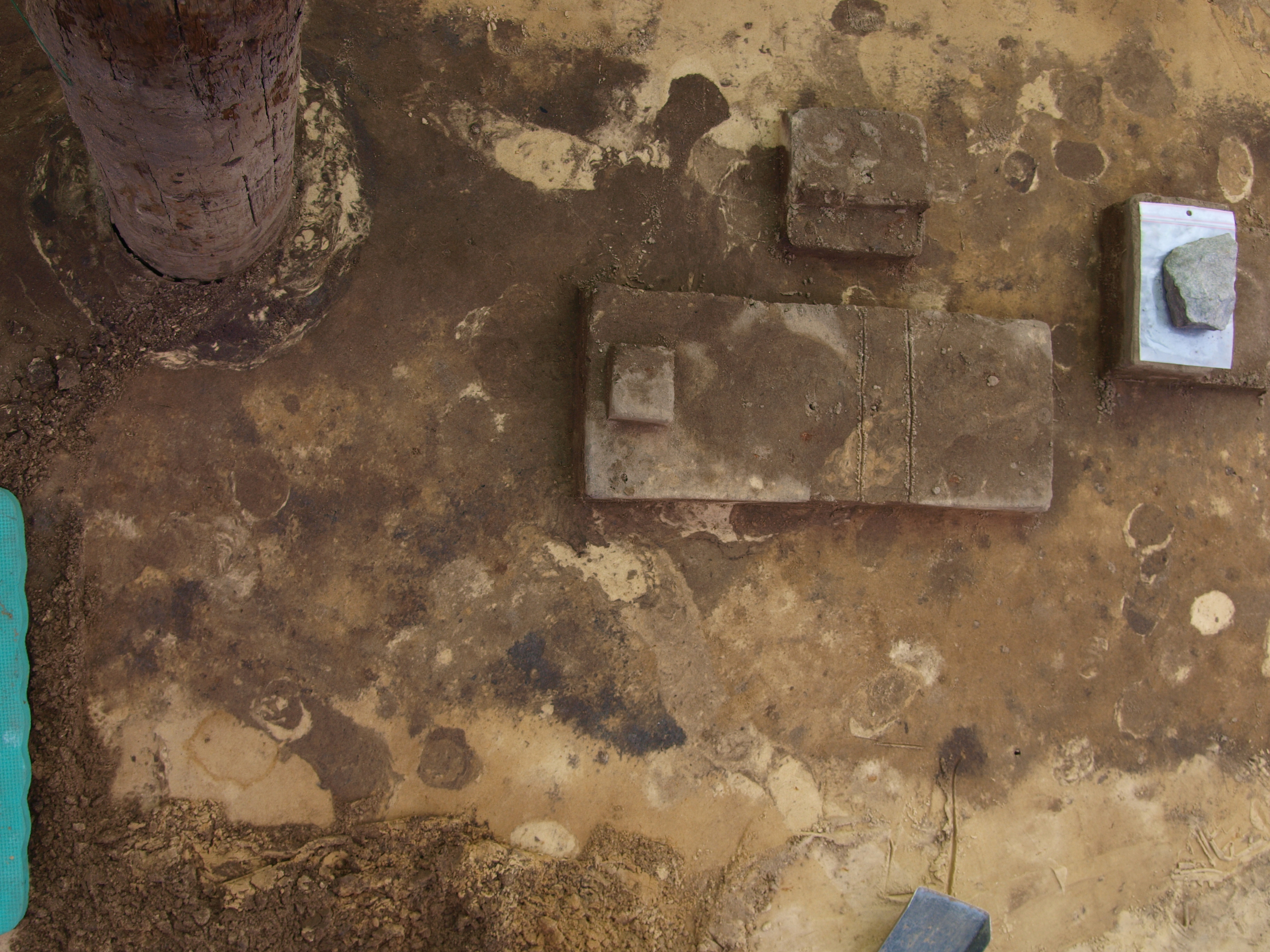
An Iron Age flat grave

A flat grave is a burial in a simple oval or rectangular pit. The pit is filled with earth, but the grave is not marked above the surface by any means such as a tumulus or upstanding earthwork. Both intact human bodies (skeletal grave) and cremated remains (urn grave) were buried in the graves.

== History ==
This simple method of burial was used often by prehistoric peoples. It was used during the Funnelbeaker culture and Corded Ware culture. It was characteristic of the Urnfield culture which stored cremated remains in urns and buried them in flat graves.

Burial customs did not always follow a pattern of continuously increasing sophistication in history. During the early La Tène culture the deceased were optionally cremated and then interred in tumulus tombs, but this changed during the later period. At that time tumulus tombs became rare and the interment of cremated remains in flat graves was the dominant method of burial again.

== See also ==
- Enclosed cremation cemetery
