= Wetland settlement =

Wooden structures in damp areas

Wetland settlements are settlements in permanently or intermittently damp areas, e.g., by lake shores and in marshlands.

== Motivation ==
Common explanations include defense (see "Lake fortress"), to free up dry land for cultivation, and easy access to transport routes or to different biotopes for exploitation. Wetlands offered, in addition to hunting and fishing, conditions for cattle and small scale cultivation of different crops.

== Construction ==
In terms of foundations, dwellings in such settlements can be classified in two types. In fen-type wetlands with small fluctuation of water level, e.g., on the shores of small lakes, houses were built without foundation or on simple foundations, such as clay floors or log floors. Another type is a stilt house, a structure elevated on stilts above the ground or water body.

Reconstructions
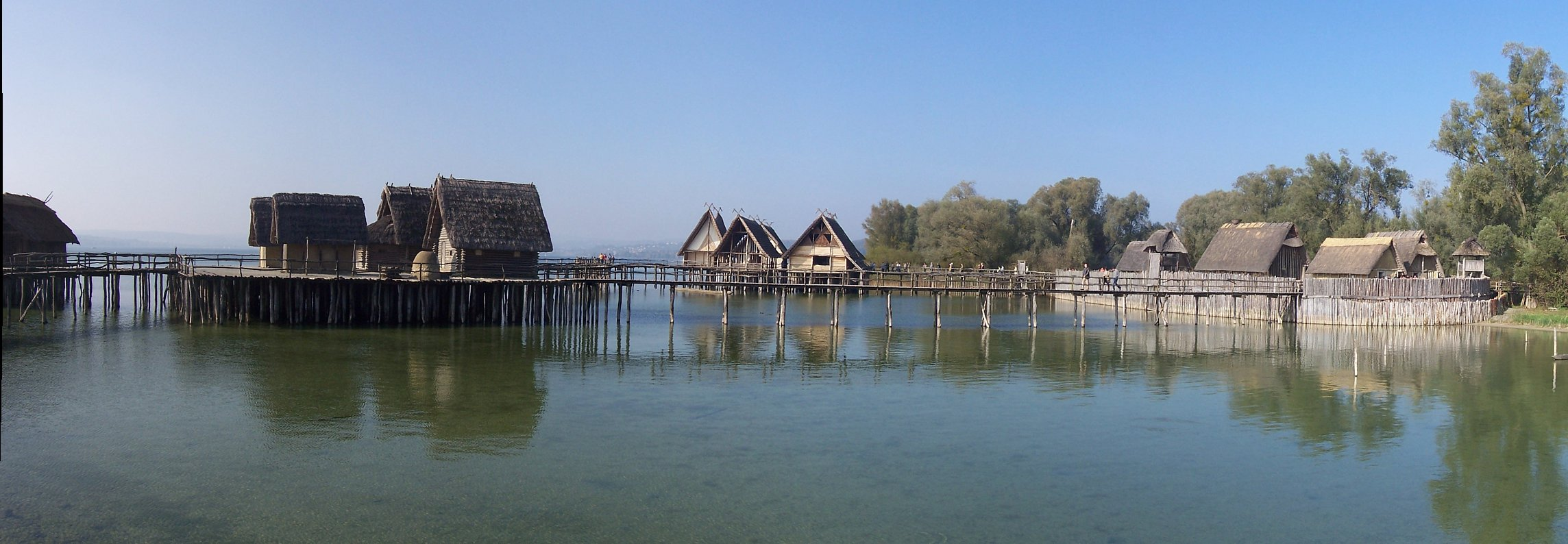
Pfahlbaumuseum Unteruhldingen, wetland settlement

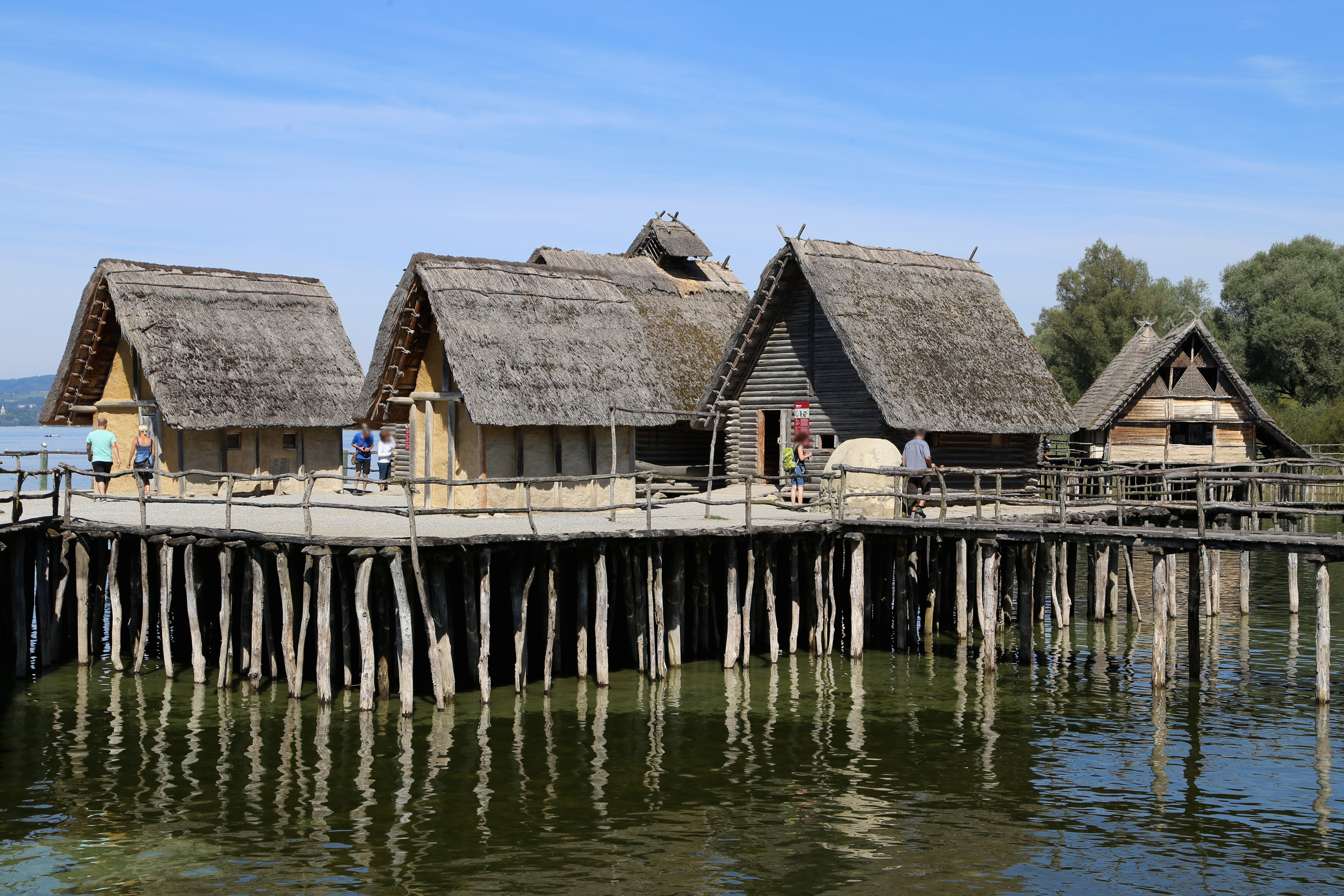
Stilthouses in Pfahlbaumuseum

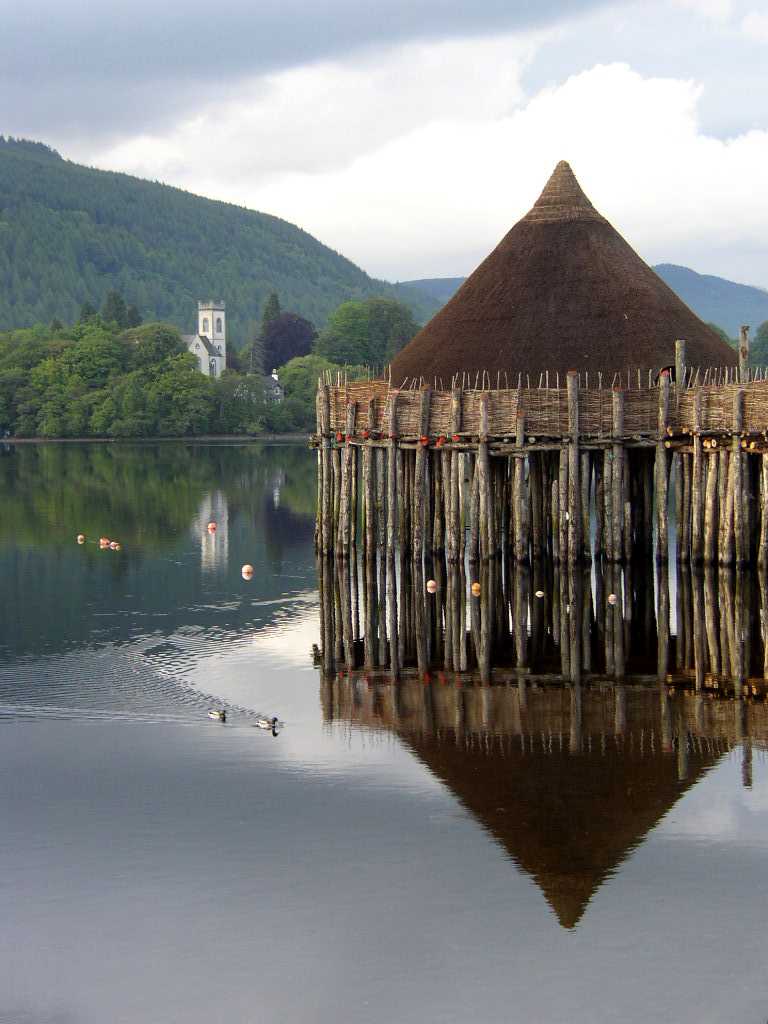
Loch Tay crannog

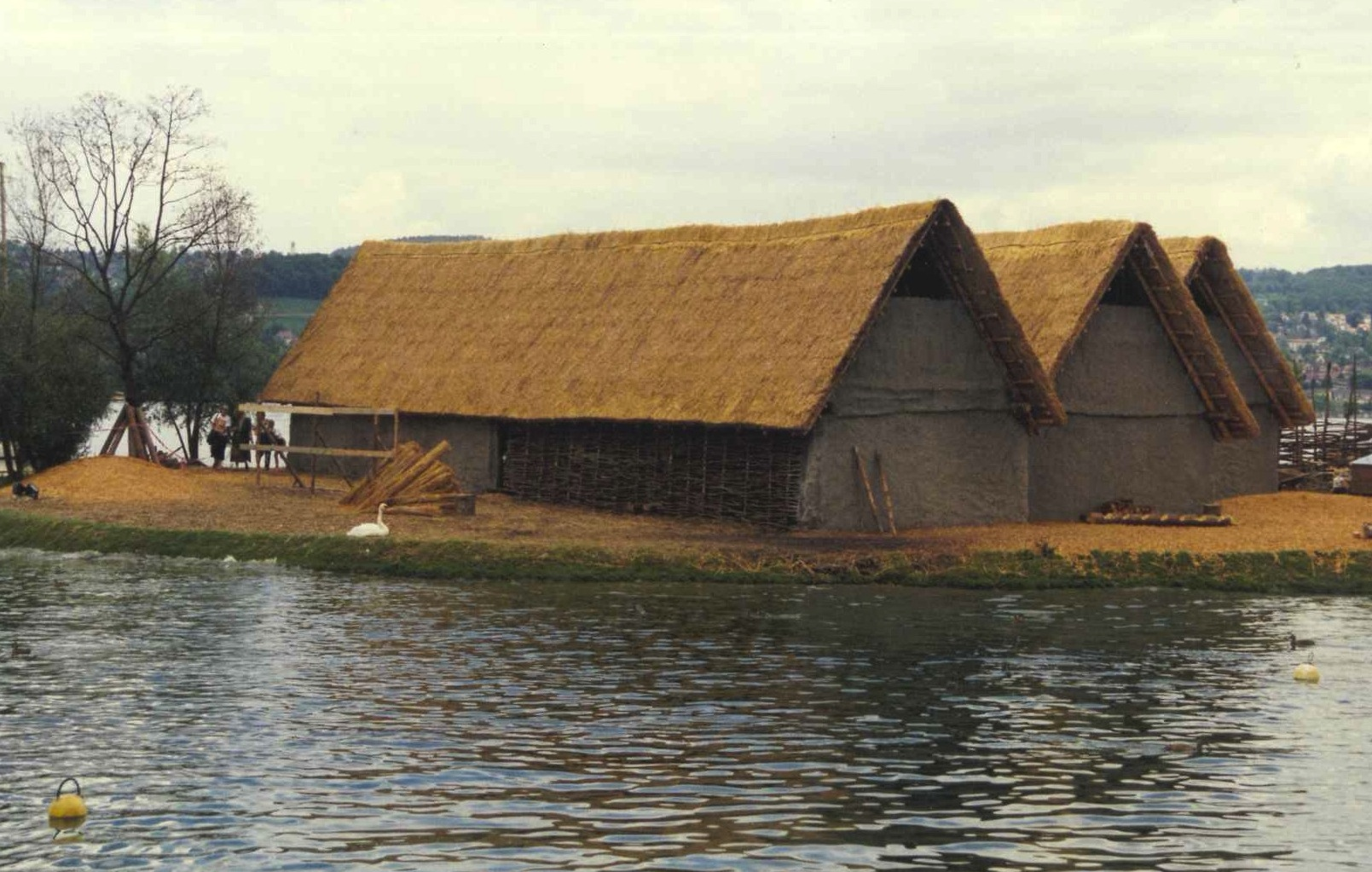
Non-stilted wetland settlement

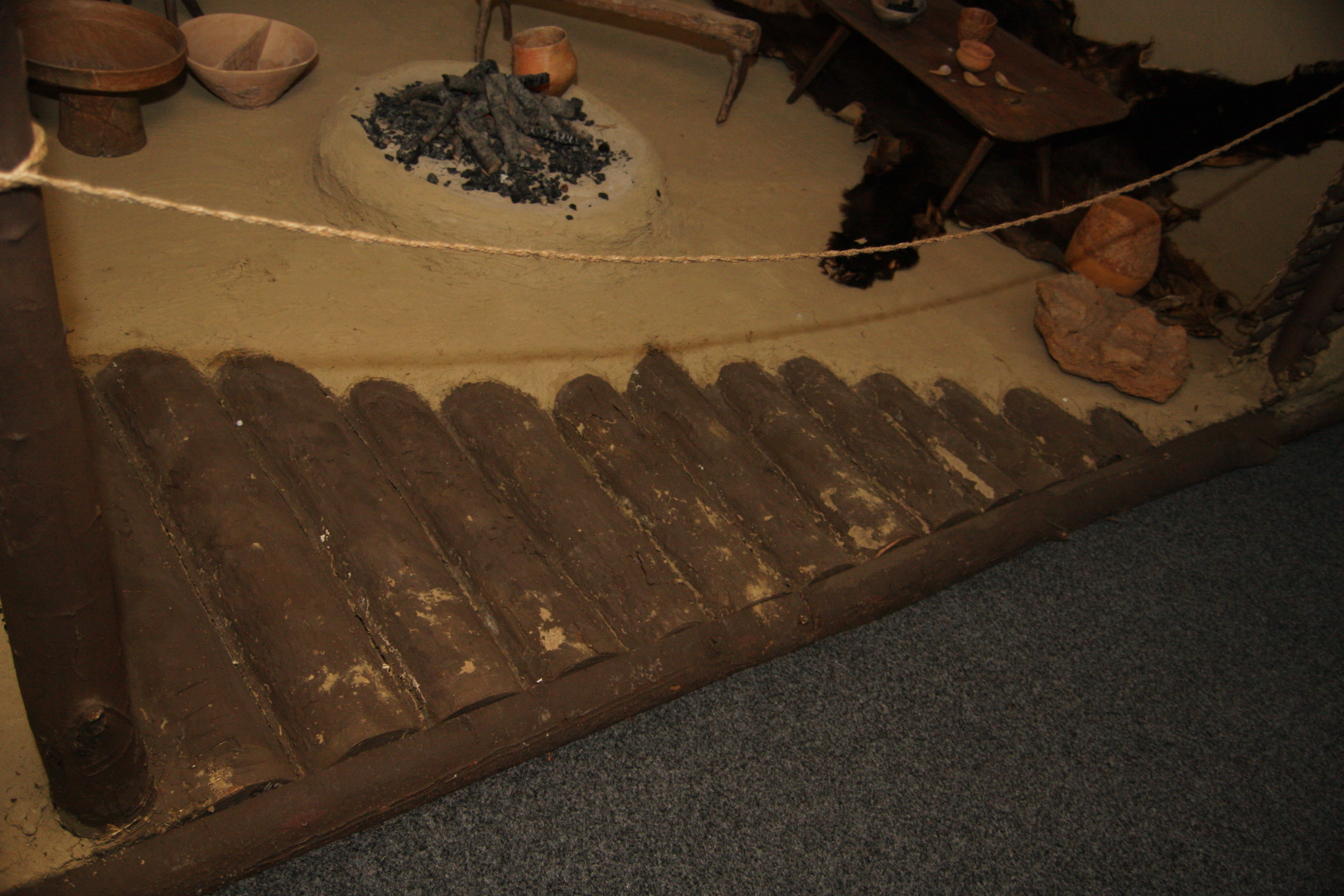
Clay-covered log floor

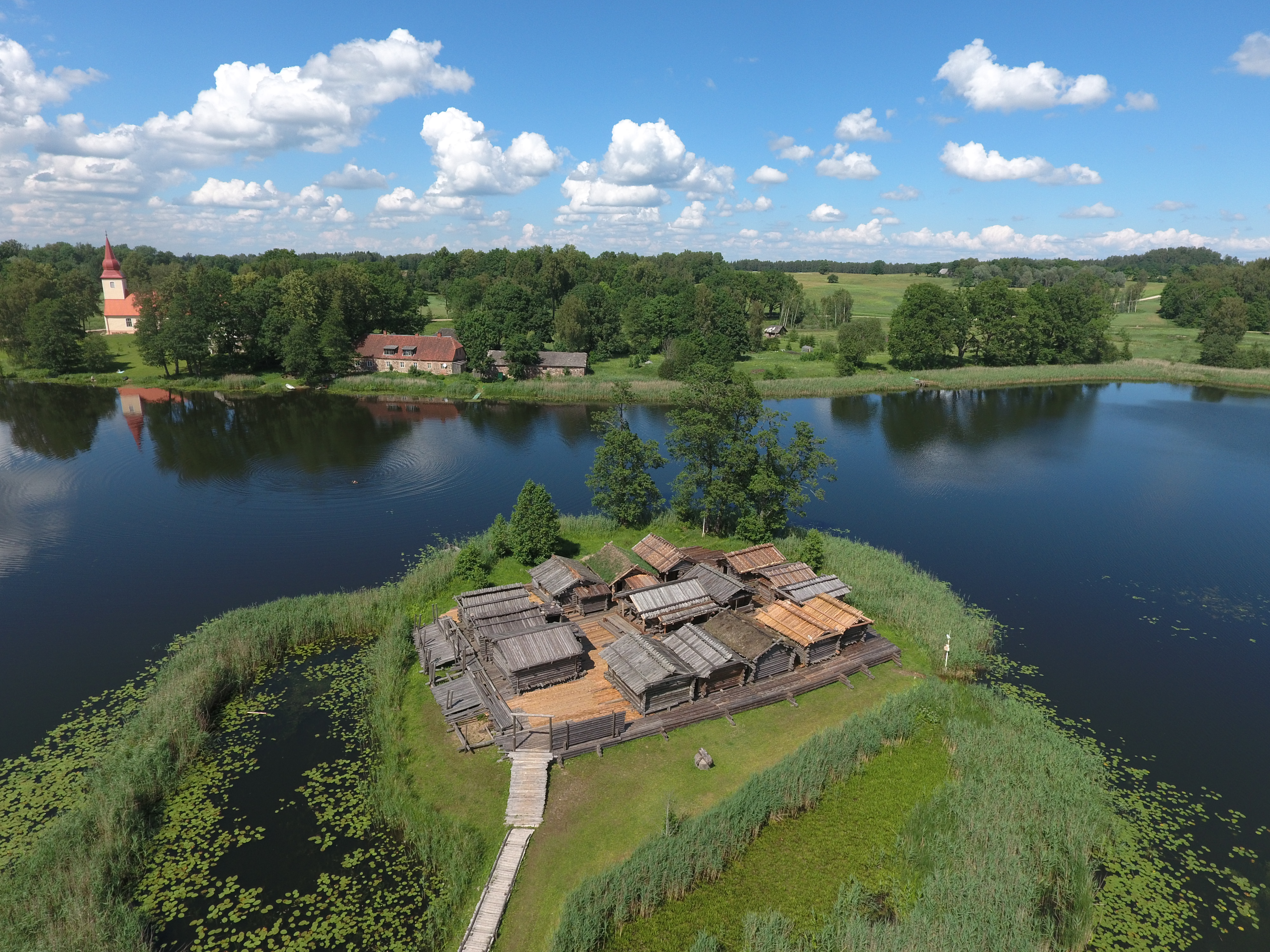
Āraiši lake fortress

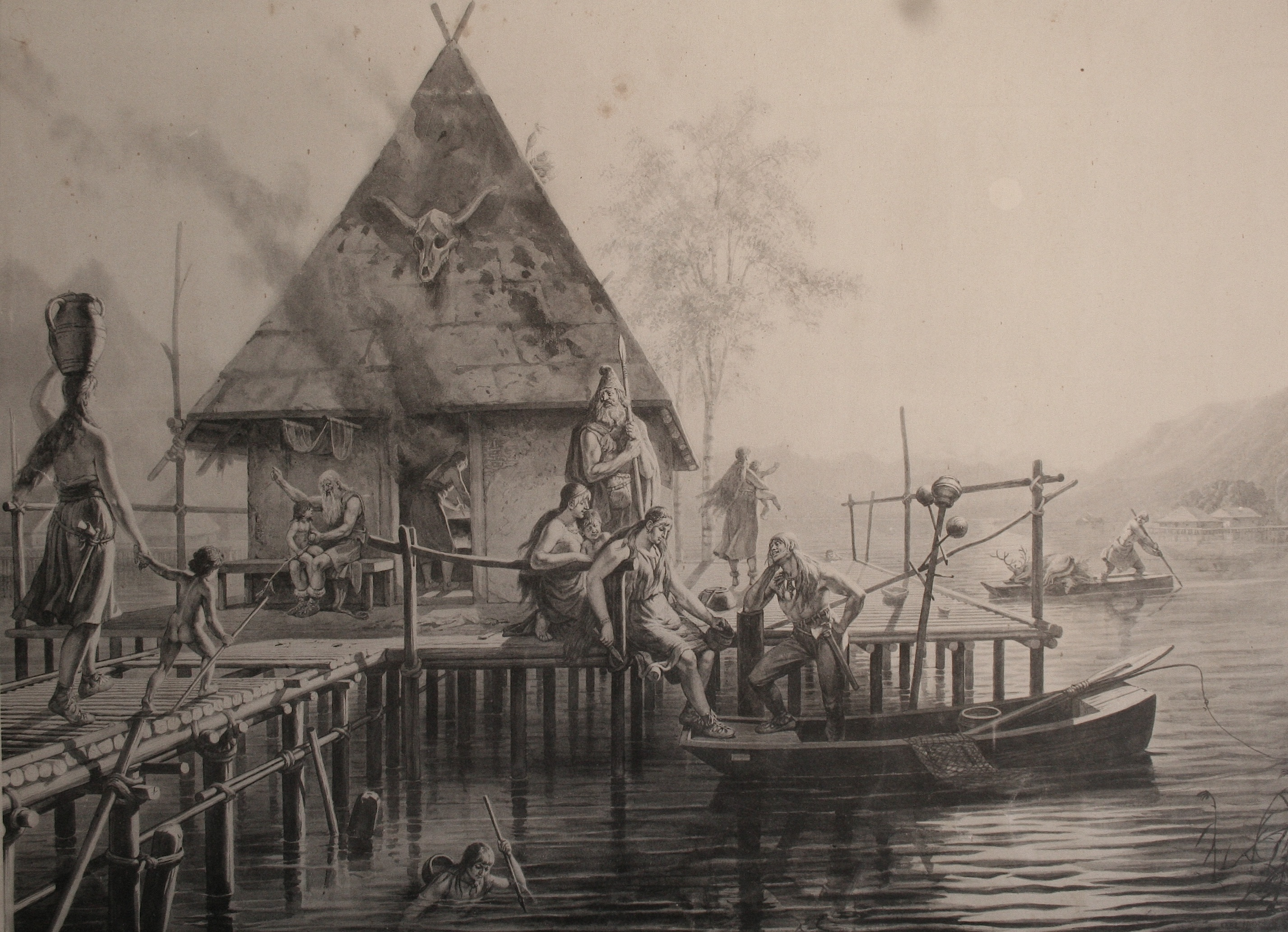
"Stiltshouse Dwellers" by Karl Jauslin, example of stilthouse romanticism

== See also ==
- Pfahlbaumuseum Unteruhldingen, German stilthouse museum
- Marshland colonization
