= Biofact (philosophy) =

In philosophy and sociology, a biofact is a being that is both an artifact and living being, or both natural and artificial. This being has been created by purposive human action but exists by processes of growth. The word is a neologism coined from the combination of the words bios and artifact.

There are sources who cite some creations of genetic engineering as examples of biofacts.

== History ==
Biofact was introduced as early as 2001 by the German philosopher Nicole C. Karafyllis although her book Biofakte published in 2003 is commonly used as reference for the introduction of the term. According to Karafyllis, the word biofact first appeared in a German article (entitled 'Biofakt und Artefakt') in 1943, written by the Austrian protozoologist Bruno M. Klein. Addressing both microscopy and philosophy, Klein named a biofact something that is a visible dead product emerging from a living being while this being is still alive (e.g. a shell). However, Klein's distinction operated with the difference biotic/abiotic and dead/alive, not with nature/technology and growth/man-made. For her part, Karafyllis described biofact as a hermeneutic concept that allows the comparison between nature and technology in the domain of the living.

== Philosophy ==
With the term biofact, Karafyllis wants to emphasize that living entities can be highly artificial due to methods deriving from agriculture, gardening (e.g. breeding) or biotechnology (e.g. genetic engineering, cloning). Biofacts show signatures of culture and technique. Primarily, the concept aims to argue against the common philosophical tradition to summarize all kinds of living beings under the category nature. The concept biofact questions if the phenomenon of growth is and was a secure candidate for differentiating between nature and technology.

For the philosophy of technology the questions arise if a) biotechnology and agriculture should not be an integral part of reflexion, thereby adding new insights to the common focus on the machine and the artifact, and if b) established concepts of technique and technology which stress artificiality should not be modified. Karafyllis regards the inclusion of biofacts into a theory of techniques as a chance, to reformulate classic concepts of design and construction for defining the making of artifacts. In her view, biofacts depend on the method of provocation.

For the philosophy of nature, biofacts highlight a need to clarify if nature is self-explanatory in every case. Biophilosophy is challenged to newly reflect upon the categories organism and living being. In the philosophy of science, approaches are challenged which only focus on the category thing (or epistemic thing) without historizing the technicality, mediality and materiality of its emerging as a living object. For the sociology of science the biofact concept is fruitful to discuss the exclusiveness of scientific knowledge (the role of the expert) while making scientific objects which are released into the lifeworld or public sphere. Particularly because the biofact concept deals with the phenomenon of growth and the establishing of a self, it is also influential in the philosophical disciplines phenomenology, anthropology and ontology. It was Jürgen Habermas who recently stressed the anthropological consequences if mankind gives up the differentiation of "coming into being" and "making".

Artifacts are artificial, i.e. man-made objects. Contrary to biofacts, they cannot be found in nature. Therefore, biofacts demarcate an ontological intersection. They are partially man-made, but growing. Like artifacts, they have been made for a certain utility. Biofacts can be seen as biotic artifacts which show their character as hybrids in multifold perspectives.

The term is also enabling philosophers to criticize some concepts in technoscience, where the union of scientific knowledge about nature and the technical creation of technonature is seen as progress in the political sense. The term has also been adopted in the new BioArt, not rarely without using its critical impacts.

As Karafyllis complemented the growth and reproduction of organisms with technical entities, she established a typology of different kinds of organisms according to their uses and these are:

- Natural life form
- Unaltered biofacts
- Reshaped biofacts
- Genetically reproduced biofacts
- Genetically modified biofacts.

== Literature ==
- Nicole C. Karafyllis (ed.): Biofakte - Versuch über den Menschen zwischen Artefakt und Lebewesen. Paderborn, Mentis 2003 (in German).
- Nicole C. Karafyllis: Biofakte - Grundlagen, Probleme, Perspektiven. Discussion Unit in the journal Deliberation Knowledge Ethics / Erwaegen Wissen Ethik, Vol. 17, Nr. 4 (2006). (in German with English abstracts)
- Nicole C. Karafyllis: Growth of Biofacts: the real thing or metaphor?. In: R. Heil, A. Kaminski, M. Stippack, A. Unger and M. Ziegler (Ed.): Tensions and Convergences. Technological and Aesthetic (Trans)Formations of Society. Bielefeld (2007). 141–152. (in English)
- Nicole C. Karafyllis: Endogenous Design of Biofacts. Tissues and Networks in Bio Art and Life Science. In: sk-interfaces. Exploding borders - creating membranes in art, technology and society. Ed. by Jens Hauser. Liverpool: University of Liverpool Press (European Ed.) (2008), 42–58. (in English)
- Nicole C. Karafyllis: Ethical and epistemological problems of hybridizing living beings: Biofacts and Body Shopping. In: Wenchao Li and Hans Poser (Ed.): Ethical Considerations on Today's Science and Technology. A German-Chinese Approach. Münster: LIT 2007, 185–198. (in English)
- Karafyllis, N.C.: Artefakt – Lebewesen – Biofakt. Philosophische Aspekte lebendiger Bauten. In: G. de Bruyn et al. (Eds.): Lebende Bauten – Trainierbare Tragwerke. Schriftenreihe Kultur und Technik, Vol. 16. Münster, New York. 2009: LIT, 97–111. (in German)
- Karafyllis, N.C. Biofakte als neue Kategorie der Informatik? In: Raimund Jakob, Lothar Phillips, Erich Schweighofer, Czaba Varga (Eds.): Auf dem Weg zur Idee der Gerechtigkeit. Gedenkschrift für Ilmar Tammelo. Münster u.a.: LIT. 249–262. (in German)
- Karafyllis, N. C.: Provokation als Methode der biotechnischen Evolution, in: Volker Gerhardt, Klaus Lucas and Günter Stock (Eds.): Evolution. Theorie, Formen und Konsequenzen eines Paradigmas in Natur, Technik und Kultur. Berlin: Akademie Verlag 2011

== Secondary literature (in English) ==
- Suzanne Anker, "Technogenesis", in: B. Andrew Lustig, Baruch A. Brody, Gerald P. McKenny (Eds.): Altering nature: concepts of nature and the natural in biotechnology debates, Springer 2008, pp. 275–322.
- Torsten Meyer and Uta Hassler: "Construction History and the History of Science ", Proceedings of the Third International Concress of Concstruction History, Cottbus May 2009
- Orlan: A Hybrid Body of Artworks, ed. by S. Shepherd and Orlan, Taylor&Francis 2010.
- Ingeborg Reichle: Art in the Age of Technoscience. Genetic Engineering, Robotics, and Artificial Life in Contemporary Art. Vienna, New York: Springer 2010.

→ See the German Wikipedia entry for further literature in German.
