= Biofact (biology) =

Dead material of a once-living organism

In biology, a biofact is dead material of a once-living organism.

In 1943, the protozoologist Bruno M. Klein of Vienna (1891–1968) coined the term in his article Biofakt und Artefakt in the microscopy journal Mikrokosmos, though at that time it was not adopted by the scientific community. Klein's concept of biofact stressed the dead materials produced by living organisms as sheaths, such as shells.

The word biofact is now widely used in the zoo/aquarium world, but was first used by Lisbeth Bornhofft in 1993 in the Education Department at the New England Aquarium, Boston, to refer to preserved items such as animal bones, skins, molts and eggs. The Accreditation Standards and Related Policies of the Association of Zoos and Aquariums states that biofacts can be useful education tools, and are preferable to live animals because of potential ethical considerations.

== See also ==
- Biofact (archaeology)
