= Tonosho =

Tonosho may refer to:

- Tōnoshō, Chiba, a town in Chiba Prefecture, Japan
- Tonoshō, Kagawa, a town in Kagawa Prefecture, Japan
