= Matsugishi Station =

Railway station in Chōshi, Chiba Prefecture, Japan

Matsugishi Station 松岸駅
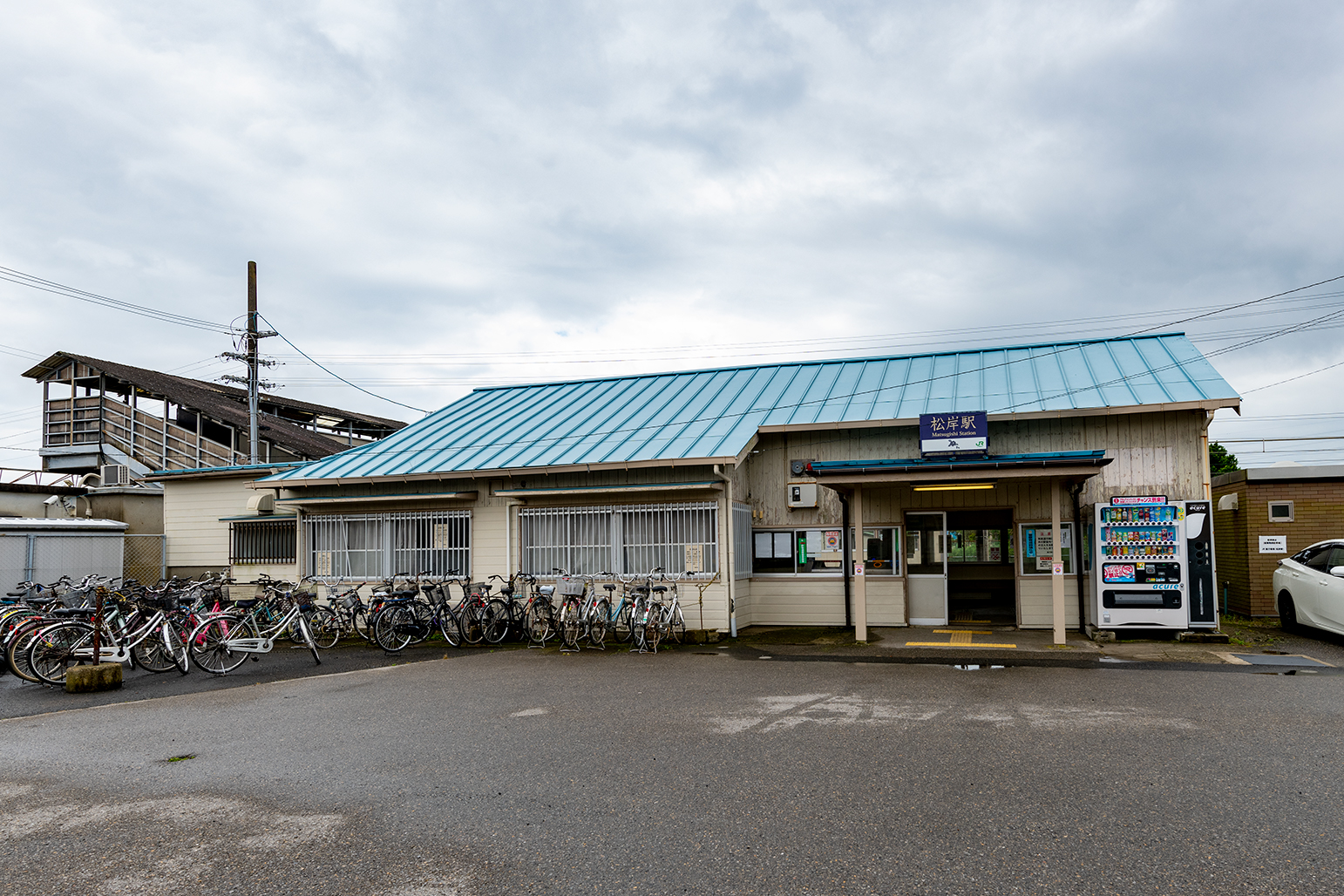
- Matsugishi Station in 2020

General information
- Location: 3-Chome Matsugishimachi, Chōshi-shi, Chiba-ken 288–0836; Japan
- Coordinates: 35.7392°N 140.7950°E
- Operator: JR East
- Lines: ■ Sōbu Main Line; ■ Narita Line
- Distance: 117.3 km from Tokyo
- Platforms: 1 side + 1 island platform

Other information
- Status: Staffed
- Website: Official website

History
- Opened: 1 June 1897

Passengers
- 2019: 468 daily

Services
Preceding station	JR East	Following station
Saruda towards Chiba	Sōbu Main Line Local	Chōshi Terminus
Shiishiba towards Chiba	Narita Line	Chōshi Terminus
Location
- Location within Chiba Prefecture Location within Japan

Matsugishi Station (松岸駅, Matsugishi-eki) is a junction passenger railway station in the city of Chōshi, Chiba, Japan, operated by East Japan Railway Company (JR East).

== Lines ==
Matsugishi Station is served by the Sōbu Main Line and Narita Line, and is located 117.3 km from the western terminus of the Sōbu Main Line at Tokyo Station and 75.4 kilometers from the terminus of the Narita Line at Sakura Station.

== Station layout ==
The station consists of a side platform and an island platform connected by a footbridge. The station building is a wooden, one-story structure. The station is staffed.

=== Platforms ===
1	■ Sōbu Main Line	for Asahi, Yōkaichiba, Narutō, and Chiba
2	■ Narita Line	for Omigawa, Sakura, Narita, and Chiba
3	■ Sōbu Main Line	for Chōshi
3	■ Narita Line	for Chōshi

== History ==
Matsugishi Station opened on 1 June 1897 as a station on the Sōbu Railway. On 1 September 1907, the Sōbu Railway was nationalised, becoming part of the Japanese Government Railway (JGR). On 11 March 1933, the Narita Line was extended from Sasagawa to this station. After World War II, the JGR became the Japanese National Railways (JNR). The station was absorbed into the JR East network upon the privatization of the Japanese National Railways (JNR) on 1 April 1987.

== Passenger statistics ==
In fiscal 2019, the station was used by an average of 468 passengers daily.

The passenger figures for previous years are as shown below.

Fiscal year	Daily average
2000	611
2005	641
2010	501
2015	497

== See also ==
- List of railway stations in Japan
