= Shiishiba Station =

Railway station in Chōshi, Chiba Prefecture, Japan

Shiishiba Station 椎柴駅
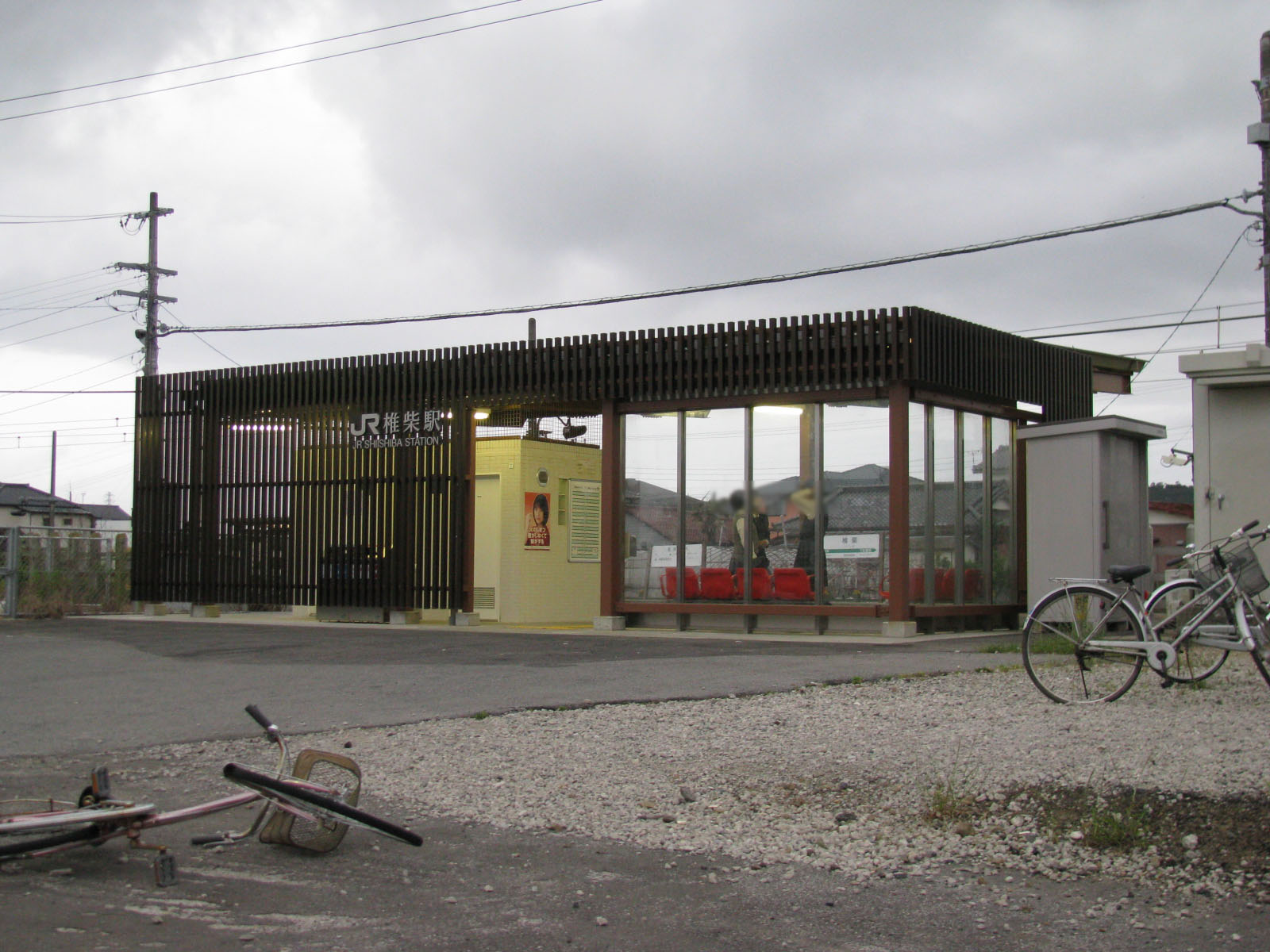
- Shiishiba Station

General information
- Location: Nojiricho 169, Chōshi-shi, Chiba-ken 288-0863; Japan
- Coordinates: 35.7652°N 140.7590°E
- Operator: JR East
- Line: ■ Narita Line
- Distance: 71.0 km from Sakura
- Platforms: 2 side platforms

Other information
- Status: Unstaffed
- Website: Official website

History
- Opened: March 11, 1933

Passengers
- 2006: 511 daily

Services
Preceding station	JR East	Following station
Shimōsa-Toyosato towards Chiba	Narita Line	Matsugishi towards Chōshi
Location
- Location within Chiba Prefecture Location within Japan

Shiishiba Station (椎柴駅, Shiishiba-eki) is a passenger railway station in the city of Chōshi, Chiba, Japan, operated by the East Japan Railway Company (JR East).

== Lines ==
Shiishiba Station is served by the Narita Line, and is located 71.0 kilometers from the terminus of line at Sakura Station.

== Station layout ==
The station consists of dual opposed side platforms connected by a footbridge. The station is unattended.

=== Platforms ===
1	■ Narita Line	For Chōshi
2	■ Narita Line	For Sawara, Narita, Sakura, Chiba

== History ==
Shiishiba Station was opened on March 11, 1933 as a station on the Japanese Government Railway (JGR) for both freight and passenger operations. After World War II, the JGR became the Japan National Railways (JNR). Scheduled freight operations were suspended from October 1, 1962. The station has been unattended since March 15, 1974. The station was absorbed into the JR East network upon the privatization of the Japan National Railways (JNR) on April 1, 1987. The station building was rebuilt in 2007.

== Passenger statistics ==
In fiscal 2006, the station was used by an average of 511 passengers daily.

== Surrounding area ==
- National Route 356
- Chōshi City Hall Western Branch
- Chōshi Municipal No. 6 Junior High School
- Chōshi City Shiishiba Elementary School
- Chōshi City Funaki Elementary School

== See also ==
- List of railway stations in Japan
