= Shimōsa-Tachibana Station =

Railway station in Tōnoshō, Chiba Prefecture, Japan

Shimōsa-Tachibana Station 下総橘駅
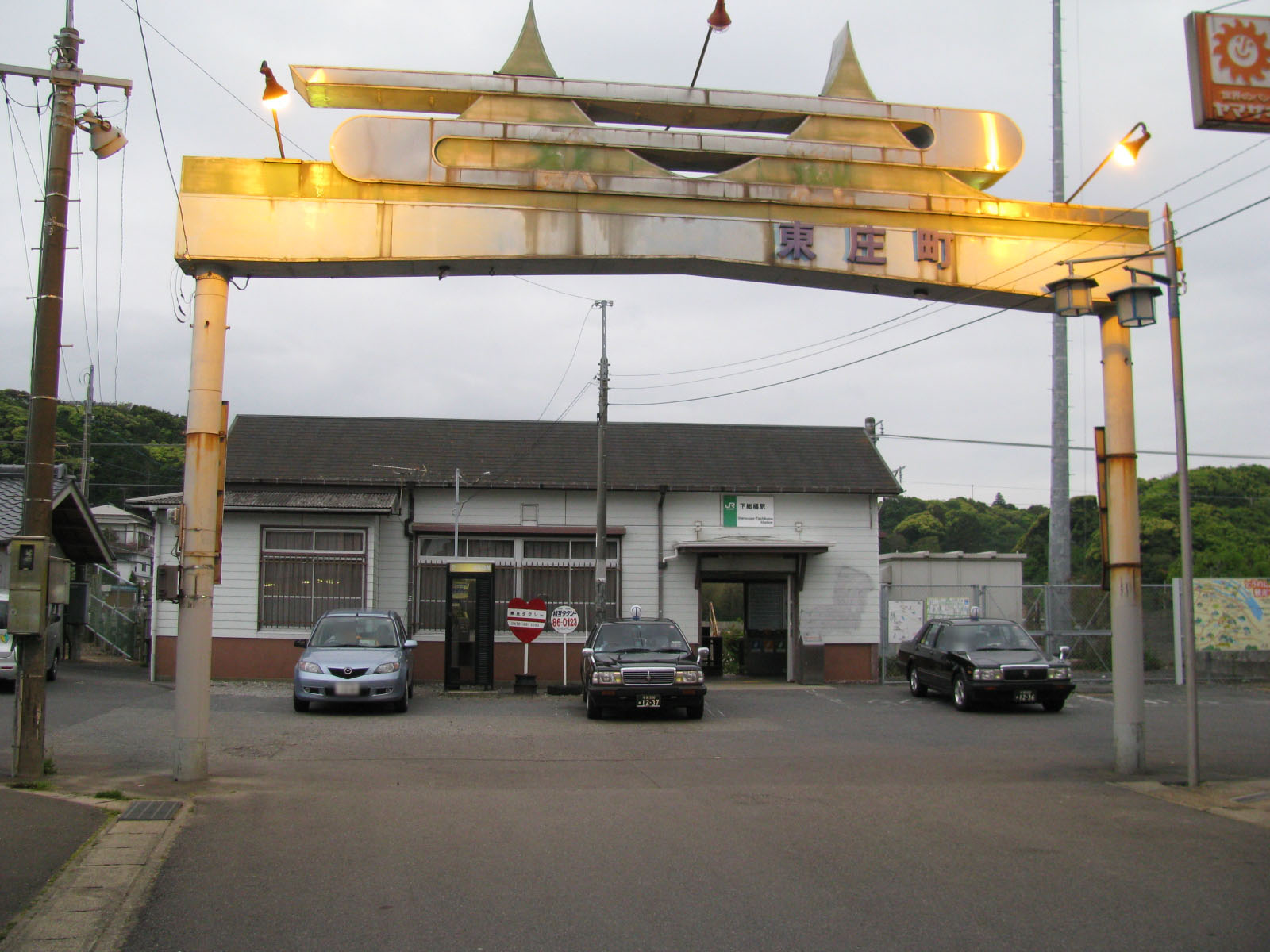
- Shimōsa-Tachibana Station building with a gate

General information
- Location: Ishide 1791, Tōnoshō-macci, Katori-gun, Chiba-ken 289-0612; Japan
- Coordinates: 35.8189°N 140.7020°E
- Operator: JR East
- Line: ■ Narita Line
- Distance: 62.9 km from Sakura
- Platforms: 2 side platforms

Other information
- Status: Unstaffed
- Website: Official website

History
- Opened: March 11, 1933

Passengers
- FY2015: 408

Services
Preceding station	JR East	Following station
Sasagawa towards Chiba	Narita Line	Shimōsa-Toyosato towards Chōshi
Location
- Location within Chiba Prefecture Location within Japan

Shimōsa-Tachibana Station (下総橘駅, Shimōsa-Tachibana-eki) is a passenger railway station in the town of Tōnoshō, Chiba, Japan, operated by the East Japan Railway Company (JR East).

== Lines ==
Shimōsa-Tachibana Station is served by the Narita Line, and is located 62.9 kilometres (39.1 mi) from the terminus of line at Sakura Station.

== Station layout ==
The station consists of dual opposed side platforms connected by a footbridge to a wooden, single-story station building. The station is unattended.

=== Platforms ===
1	■ Narita Line	For Chōshi
2	■ Narita Line	For Sawara, Narita, Sakura, Chiba

== History ==
Shimōsa-Tachibana Station was opened on March 11, 1933, as a station on the Japanese Government Railway (JGR) for both freight and passenger operations. After World War II, the JGR became the Japan National Railways (JNR). Scheduled freight operations were suspended from October 1, 1962. The station has been unattended since March 1, 1972. The station was absorbed into the JR East network upon the privatization of the Japan National Railways (JNR) on April 1, 1987.

== Passenger statistics ==
In fiscal 2015, the station was used by an average of 408 passengers daily (boarding passengers only).

== Surrounding area ==
- National Route 356
- Tonegawa Ohashi
- Tonosho Town Health and Welfare Center
- Tachibana Post Office

== See also ==
- List of railway stations in Japan
