= Noboru Yasuda =

Japanese nogaku artist and rolfer

- 安田 登
- Born: July 20, 1956 (age 70); Chōshi, Chiba Prefecture, Japan

Noboru Yasuda, (Born 20 July 1956), is a Japanese Noh performer, classical philosophy scholar, and author. He is noted for connecting traditional theatre with physical movement mechanisms and ancient literature.

== Early life ==
Yasuda was born on 20 July 1956 in Chōshi City, Chiba Prefecture, Japan. During high school, Yasuda took interest in Chinese oracle bone script and ancient Chinese philosophy once becoming familiar with Poker and Mahjong. In the 1980 and 90s, he worked in IT, developing software and writing books.

== Books ==
Yasuda has a significant amount of published works including "“Noh: What is the Mechanism that Noh has Continued for 650 Years?” (Shinchosha Publishing Co., Ltd.), “Analects in the Age of Awai: Human2.0” (Shunjusha Publishing Company), “Useful Classics” (NHK Publishing, Inc.), “The Amazing Analects” and “Inanna's Descent to the Underworld” (both published by Mishimasha Publishing)"

== Personal life ==
Yasuda is self taught scholar of ancient scripts and languages. In addition to Chinese oracle bone script, he also studies ancient Greek, Biblical Hebrew, and Sumerian.

Yasuda was diagnosed with liver cancer in 2026, which had progressed into stage 4.
