= Chōshi =

Chōshi 銚子市
- City
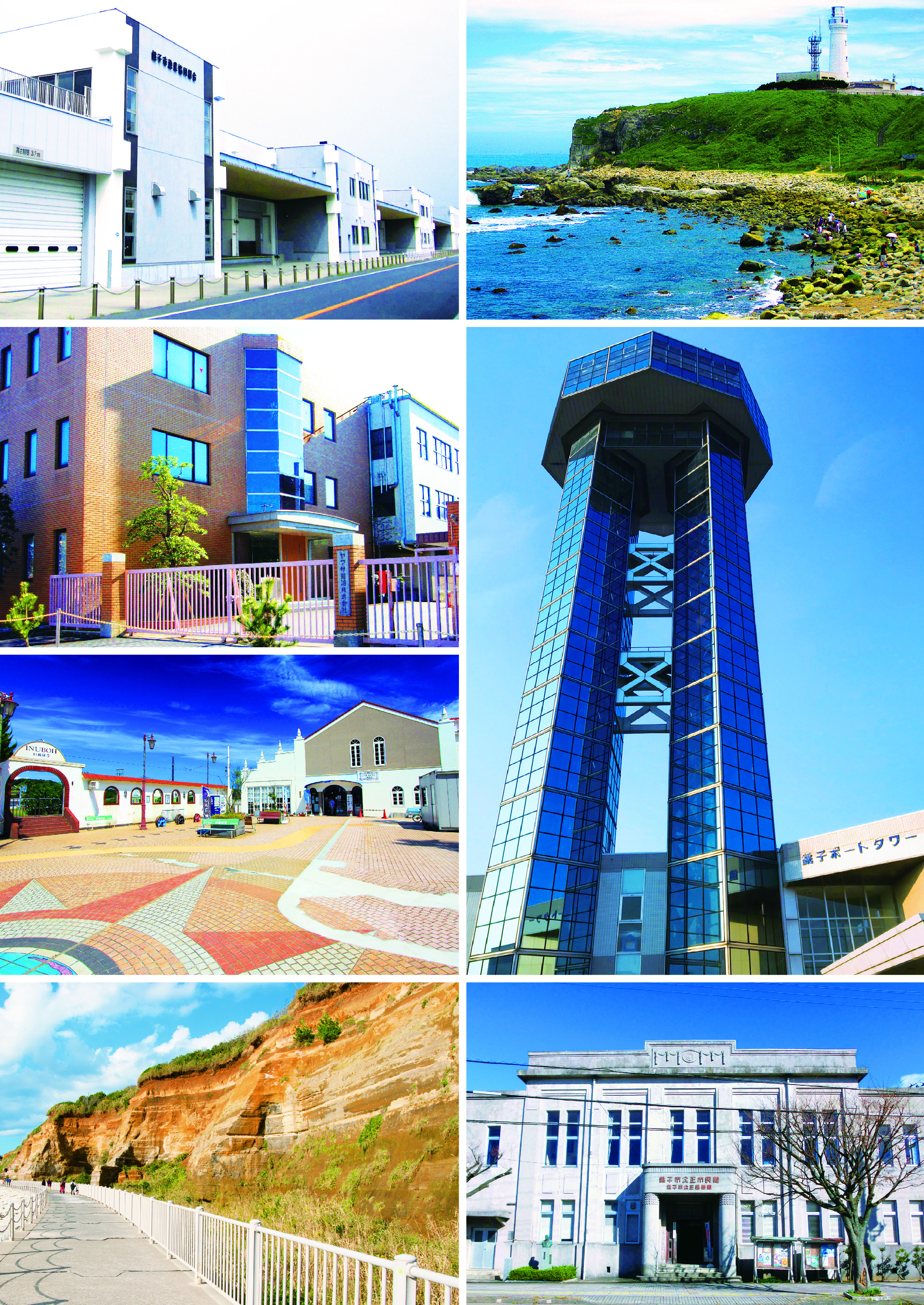
Chōshi Fishing Port	Inubōsaki Lighthouse
Yamasa Soy Sauce	Chōshi Port Tower
Inuboh Station	Chōshi Port Tower
Byōbugaura	Chōshi Public Hall
- Flag Seal

- Location of Chōshi in Chiba Prefecture

- Coordinates: 35°44′4.7″N 140°49′36.4″E
- Country: Japan
- Region: Kanto
- Prefecture: Chiba
- First official recorded: 728 AD
- City established: February 11, 1933

Government
  - Mayor: Shinichi Koshikawa (since 17 May 2013)

Area
  - Total: 84.19 km^{2} (32.51 sq mi)

Population (December 1, 2020)
  - Total: 59,174
  - Density: 702.9/km^{2} (1,820/sq mi)
- Time zone: UTC+9 (Japan Standard Time)
- Phone number: 0479-24-8181
- Address: 1-1 Wakamiyachō, Chōshi-shi, Chiba-ken 288-8601
- Climate: Cfa
- Website: Official website
- Symbols
- Fish: Sardine
- Flower: Ōmatsuyoigusa (Oenothera erythrosepala)
- Tree: Sazanka

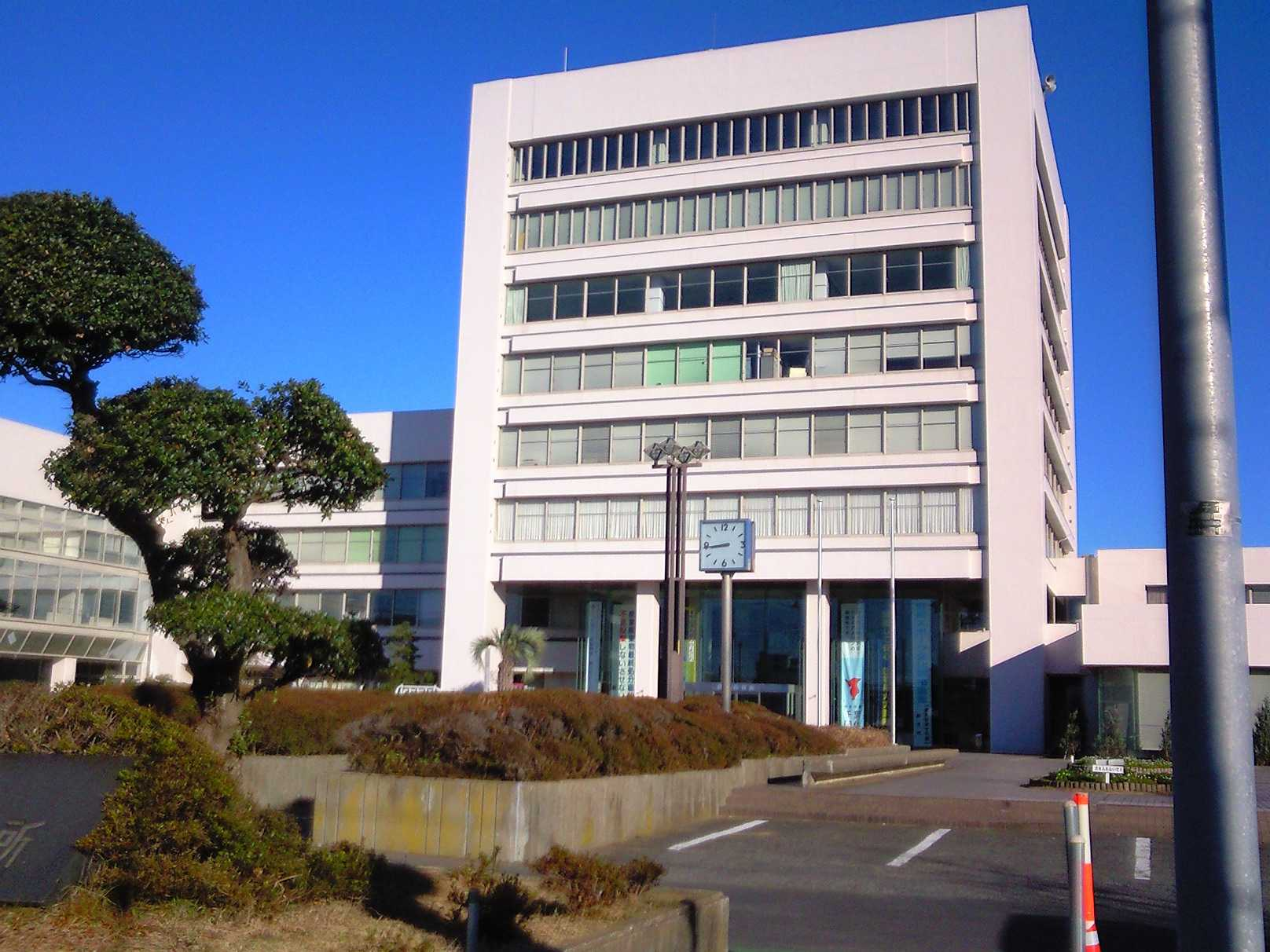
Chōshi City Hall

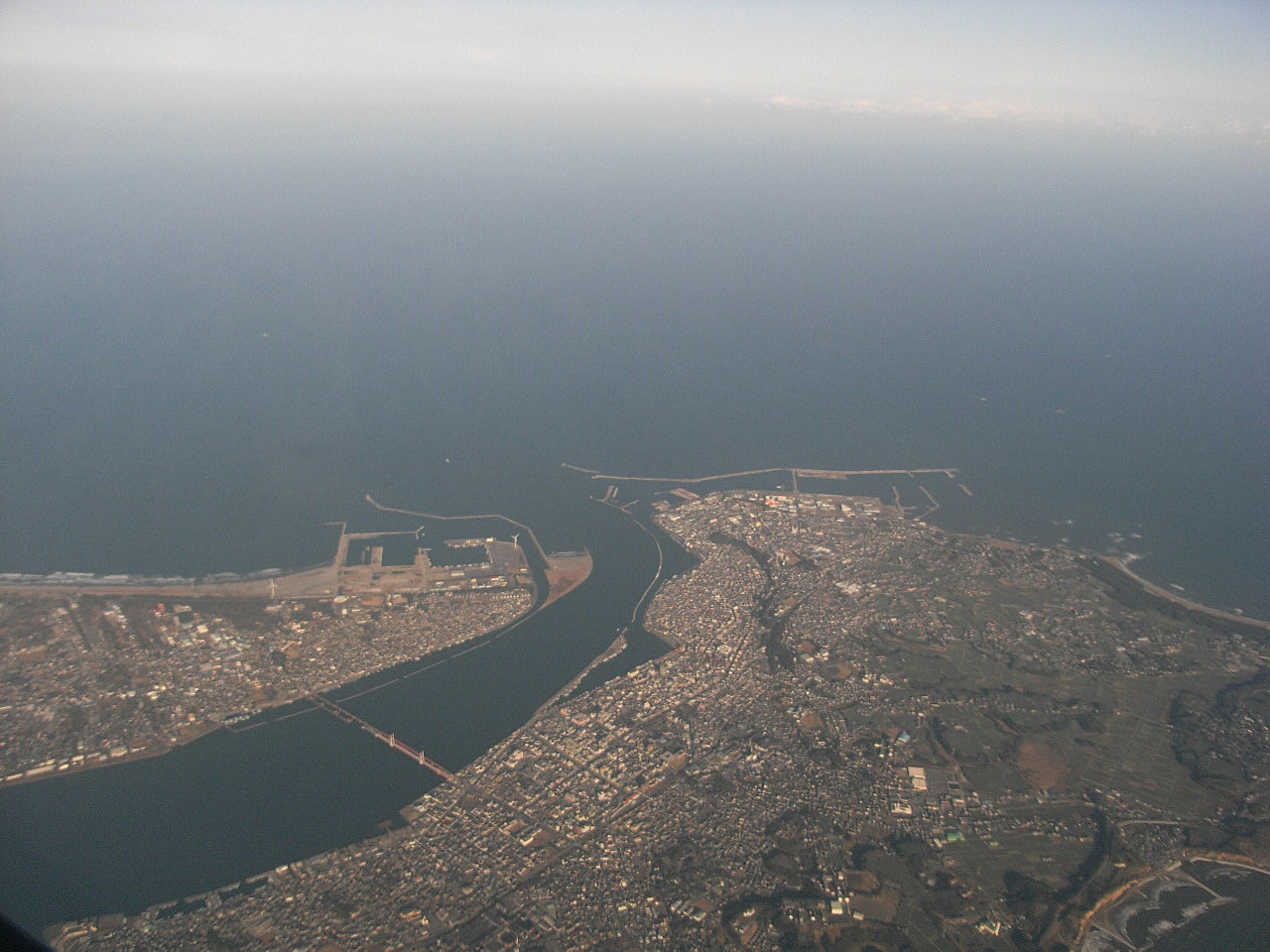
Estuary of Tone River

Chōshi (Japanese: 銚子市, romanized: Chōshi-shi, pronounced [tɕoːɕi]) is a city located in Chiba Prefecture, Japan. As of 1 December 2020, the city had an estimated population of 59,174 in 27,160 households and a population density of 700 inhabitants per square kilometre (1,800/sq mi). The total area of the city is 84.19 km^{2} (32.5 sq mi).

== Geography ==
Chōshi is located in the northeastern part of Chiba prefecture, about 65 kilometers from the prefectural capital at Chiba and 90 to 100 kilometers from central Tokyo. Cape Inubō, within the city, is the easternmost point in the Kantō region. Chōshi is noted for its dramatic sea coast on the Pacific Ocean. The Tone River runs through the northern part of the city. Takagami Atagoyama (elevation 73.6 meters) is the highest peak.

=== Neighboring municipalities ===
Chiba Prefecture

- Asahi
- Tōnoshō

Ibaraki Prefecture

- Kamisu

=== Climate ===
Chōshi has a humid subtropical climate (Köppen Cfa) characterized by warm summers and cool winters with light to no snowfall. The average annual temperature in Chōshi is 15.8 °C (60.4 °F). The average annual rainfall is 1,712.4 mm (67.42 in) with October as the wettest month. The temperature is highest on average in August, at around 25.5 °C (77.9 °F), and lowest in January, at around 6.6 °C (43.9 °F).

Climate data for Chōshi (1991−2020 normals, extremes 1887−present)
Month	Jan	Feb	Mar	Apr	May	Jun	Jul	Aug	Sep	Oct	Nov	Dec	Year
Record high °C (°F)	23.6 (74.5)	24.0 (75.2)	25.1 (77.2)	25.9 (78.6)	29.5 (85.1)	32.0 (89.6)	34.8 (94.6)	35.9 (96.6)	33.7 (92.7)	30.6 (87.1)	25.4 (77.7)	23.4 (74.1)	35.9 (96.6)
Mean maximum °C (°F)	15.9 (60.6)	17.1 (62.8)	19.0 (66.2)	22.1 (71.8)	25.3 (77.5)	27.8 (82.0)	31.3 (88.3)	32.6 (90.7)	30.7 (87.3)	26.7 (80.1)	22.3 (72.1)	18.8 (65.8)	32.9 (91.2)
Mean daily maximum °C (°F)	10.1 (50.2)	10.3 (50.5)	12.8 (55.0)	17.0 (62.6)	20.5 (68.9)	23.0 (73.4)	26.6 (79.9)	28.6 (83.5)	25.9 (78.6)	21.5 (70.7)	17.3 (63.1)	12.7 (54.9)	18.9 (65.9)
Daily mean °C (°F)	6.6 (43.9)	6.9 (44.4)	9.7 (49.5)	13.8 (56.8)	17.4 (63.3)	20.2 (68.4)	23.5 (74.3)	25.5 (77.9)	23.4 (74.1)	19.2 (66.6)	14.4 (57.9)	9.3 (48.7)	15.8 (60.5)
Mean daily minimum °C (°F)	2.9 (37.2)	3.3 (37.9)	6.4 (43.5)	10.7 (51.3)	14.8 (58.6)	17.9 (64.2)	21.2 (70.2)	23.3 (73.9)	21.3 (70.3)	16.8 (62.2)	11.1 (52.0)	5.7 (42.3)	12.9 (55.3)
Mean minimum °C (°F)	−0.9 (30.4)	−0.9 (30.4)	1.2 (34.2)	4.6 (40.3)	10.4 (50.7)	14.4 (57.9)	18.0 (64.4)	20.2 (68.4)	16.9 (62.4)	11.4 (52.5)	5.8 (42.4)	1.0 (33.8)	−1.4 (29.5)
Record low °C (°F)	−6.2 (20.8)	−7.3 (18.9)	−4.3 (24.3)	−0.2 (31.6)	4.3 (39.7)	10.2 (50.4)	13.0 (55.4)	15.9 (60.6)	11.2 (52.2)	4.5 (40.1)	−1.3 (29.7)	−4.6 (23.7)	−7.3 (18.9)
Average precipitation mm (inches)	105.5 (4.15)	90.5 (3.56)	149.1 (5.87)	127.3 (5.01)	135.8 (5.35)	166.2 (6.54)	128.3 (5.05)	94.9 (3.74)	216.3 (8.52)	272.5 (10.73)	133.2 (5.24)	92.9 (3.66)	1,712.4 (67.42)
Average snowfall cm (inches)	trace	trace	0 (0)	0 (0)	0 (0)	0 (0)	0 (0)	0 (0)	0 (0)	0 (0)	0 (0)	0 (0)	trace
Average precipitation days (≥ 1.0 mm)	7.1	7.6	11.7	10.9	10.0	10.9	8.9	6.3	10.5	12.0	9.5	7.3	112.7
Average snowy days (≥ 1 cm)	0.1	0.1	0	0	0	0	0	0	0	0	0	0	0.2
Average relative humidity (%)	62	64	68	74	82	88	90	87	84	77	72	66	76
Mean monthly sunshine hours	179.8	159.0	168.9	183.0	188.9	142.3	174.0	221.3	159.0	137.9	140.1	163.7	2,017.8
Source: Japan Meteorological Agency

== Demographics ==
Per Japanese census data, the population of Chōshi in 2020 is approximately 58,000.

Historical population
Year	Pop.	±%
1920	55,459	—
1930	66,411	+19.7%
1940	74,571	+12.3%
1950	90,398	+21.2%
1960	91,470	+1.2%
1970	90,415	−1.2%
1980	89,416	−1.1%
1990	85,138	−4.8%
2000	78,698	−7.6%
2010	70,210	−10.8%
2020	58,431	−16.8%

== History ==
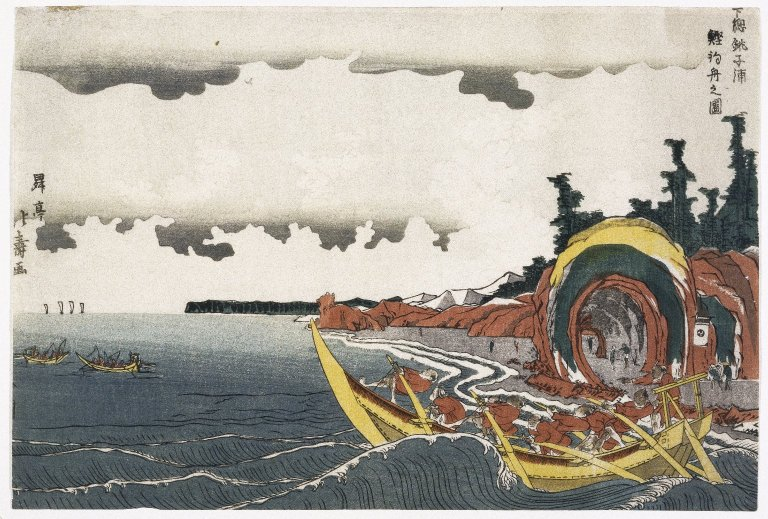
An 18th-century block print showing bonito fishing in Choshi Bay

Chōshi has been noted as a fishing port since ancient times. The commercial fishing and soy sauce industries were developed in Chōshi by the Tokugawa shogunate during the Edo period (1603–1868). Their development continued in the early industrialization of Japan in the Meiji period (1868–1912). The town of Chōshi was established with the creation of the modern municipalities system on April 1, 1889. Noted soy sauce producer Yamasa was incorporated in 1928, and Higeta in 1932. Chōshi was elevated to city status on February 11, 1933.

Chōshi was a center of industrial unrest in the early 20th century; there were numerous strikes and labor disputes at the soy sauce factories, and residents attacked the government offices in 1930 over heavy taxation and unaccounted expenditures by municipal authorities.

=== Attack on Chōshi during WWII ===
Chōshi was an important military target during World War II due to its fishing industry and canneries. Before and during the war, Chōshi was Tokyo's main food supplier. The first air raid on Chōshi by USAAF B-29 Superfortress bombers took place on March 10, 1945, causing minor damage. This was followed by the Chōshi Air Raid of July 19, 1945, during which time over 150 B-29s rained bombs on the city, destroying 33.8% of the urban area, killing 1,181 civilians and destroying 5,142 homes. The city was bombed again on August 1, 1945. Emperor Hirohito made an official visit to the ruined city on June 6, 1946, after the surrender of Japan.

== Government ==
Chōshi has a mayor-council form of government with a directly elected mayor and a unicameral city council of 18 members. Chōshi contributes two members to the Chiba Prefectural Assembly. In terms of national politics, the city is part of Chiba 10th district of the lower house of the Diet of Japan.

== Economy ==
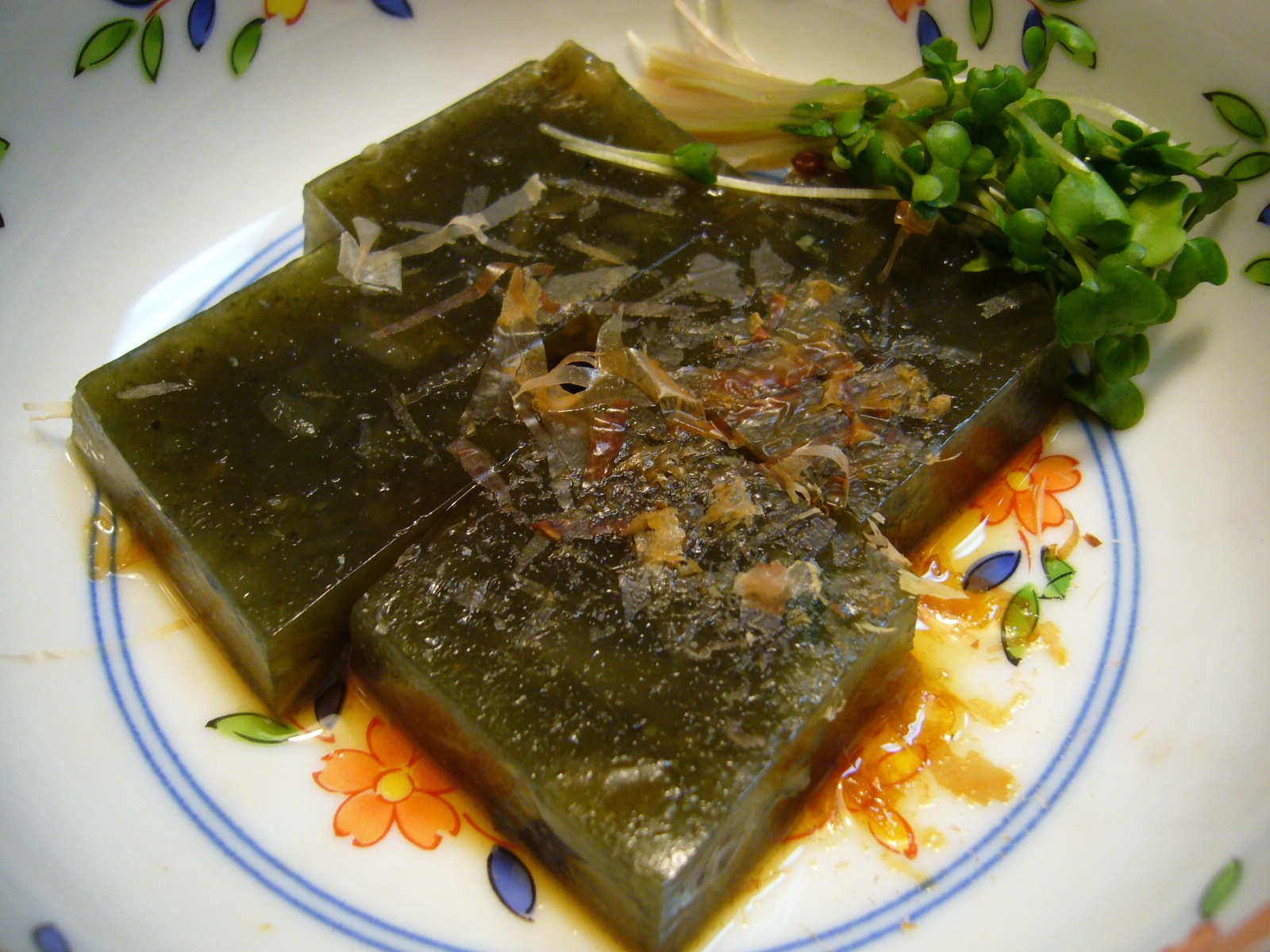
Kaisō, a jelly-like food made from the seaweed Chondrus elatus. Believed to have originated in Chōshi city

Chōshi is known as a center of soy sauce production. Production methods were introduced to Chōshi in 1616 from Settsu Province, and later from Kii Province, both near the Seto Inland Sea. Soy sauce manufacturers Higeta and Yamasa are based in Chōshi. The Port of Kashima in nearby Kashima City, Ibaraki Prefecture, is utilized to import soybeans for use in soy sauce production. The remains of soybeans not used in soy sauce production in Chōshi are returned to Kashima for production into feed for livestock.

The city is home to the Chōshi Fishing Port. Its catches of sardines, bonito, and tuna are the largest in Chiba Prefecture. Wind power is actively being developed off the rugged coast of Chōshi for use in the city and the greater Tokyo Metropolitan Area. Amber is also found in the area.

== Education ==
- Chiba Institute of Science
- Chōshi has 12 public elementary schools, five public middle schools and one public high school operated by the city government, and two public high schools operated by the Chiba Prefectural Board of Education. The prefecture also operates one special education school for the handicapped.

Prefectural high schools:

- Choshi Prefectural Choshi High School (千葉県立銚子高等学校).
- Choshi Commercial High School
- Former: Choshi Fishery High School (千葉県立銚子水産高等学校).

The municipal high school is Choshi Municipal Choshi High School.

There is also a private high school, the Chiba Institute of Science Affiliated High School.

== Transportation ==
=== Railway ===
JR East – Sōbu Main Line

- Saruda – Matsugishi – Chōshi

JR East – Narita Line

- Shimōsa-Toyosato – Shiishiba – Matsugishi (– Chōshi)

Chōshi Electric Railway Company – Choshi Electric Railway Line

- Chōshi – Nakanochō – Kannon – Moto-Chōshi – Kasagami-Kurohae – Nishi-Ashikajima – Ashikajima – Kimigahama – Inuboh – Tokawa
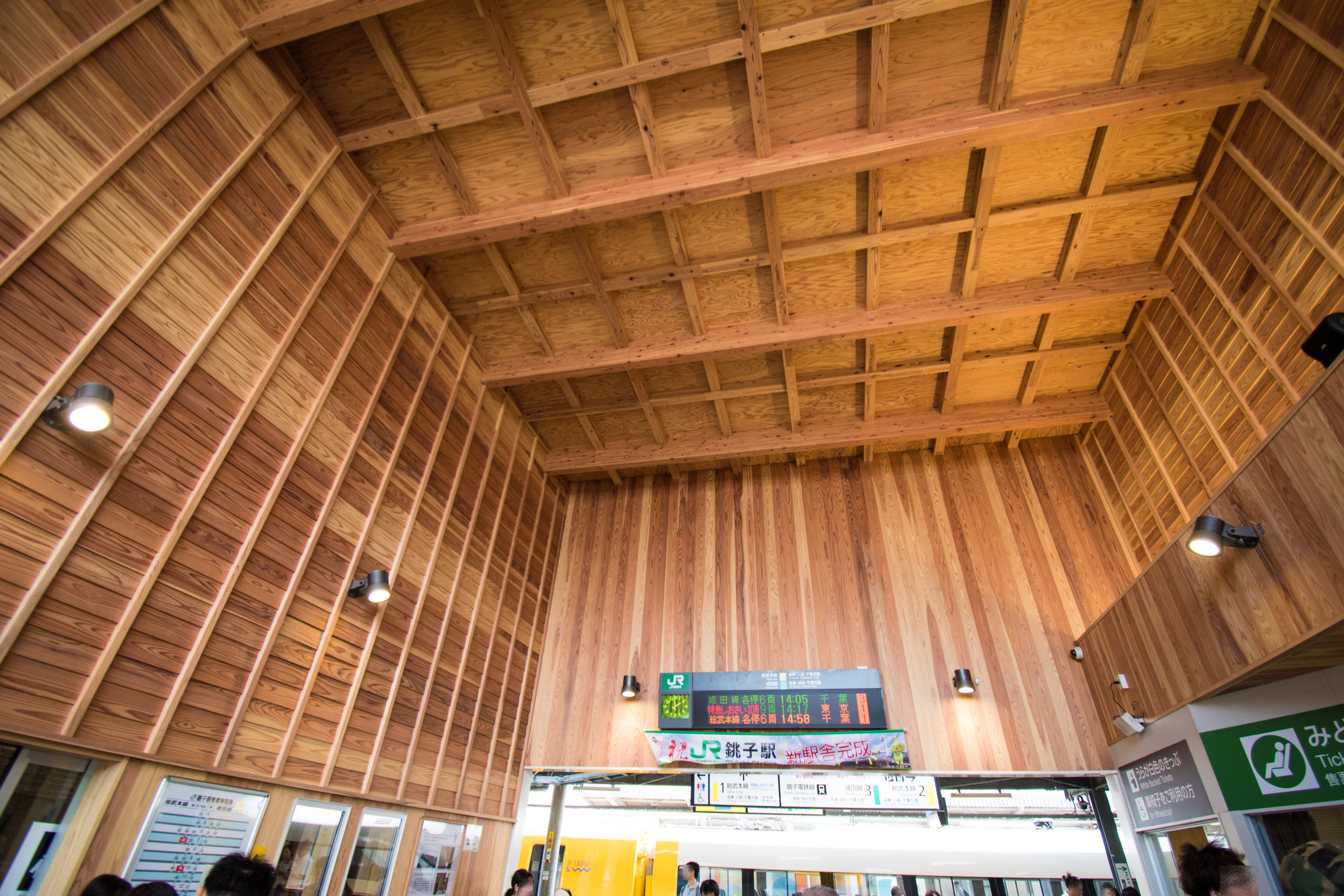
Chōshi Station

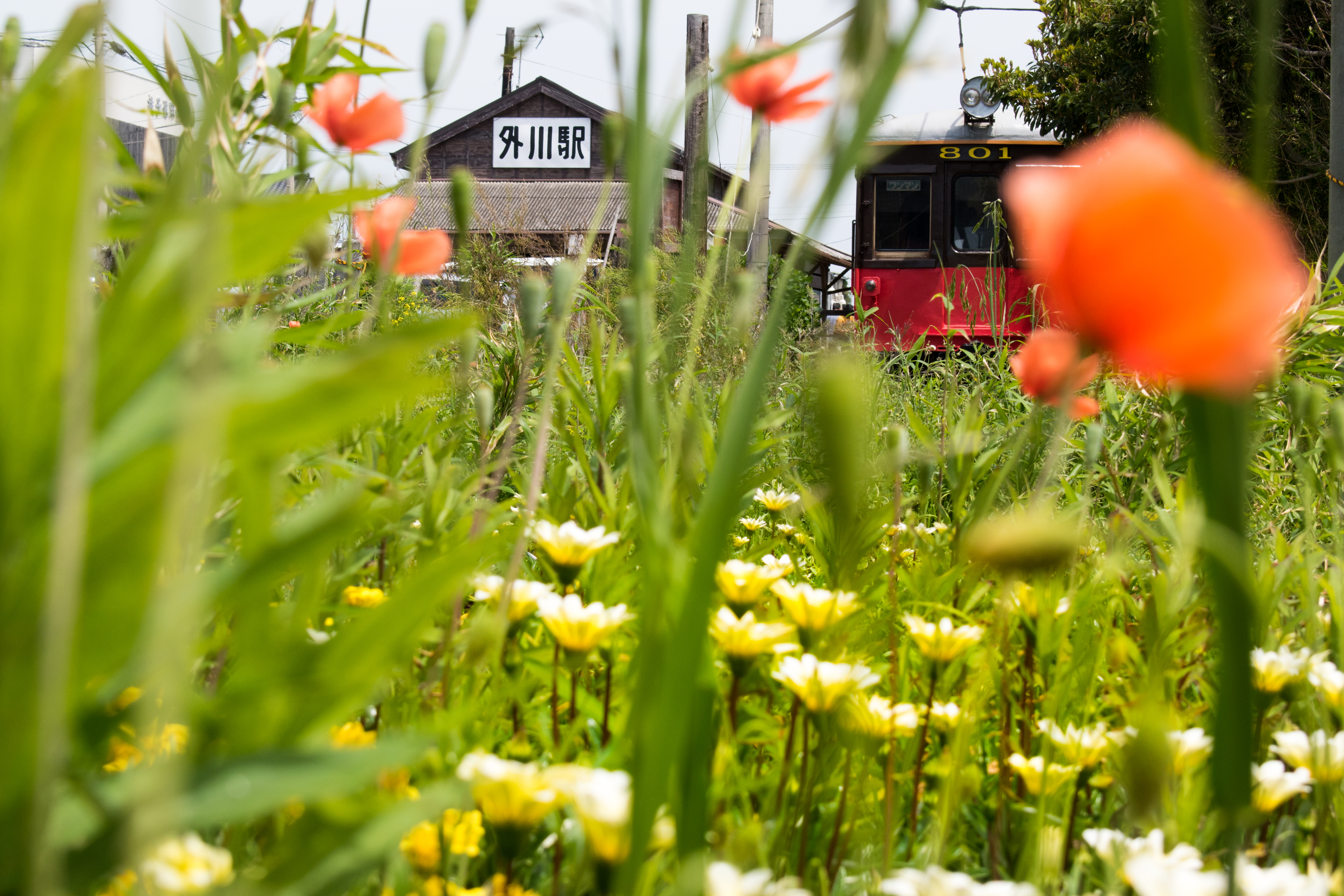
Tokawa Station

=== Highways ===
- Tateyama Expressway
- National Route 124
- National Route 126
- National Route 356

== Local attractions ==
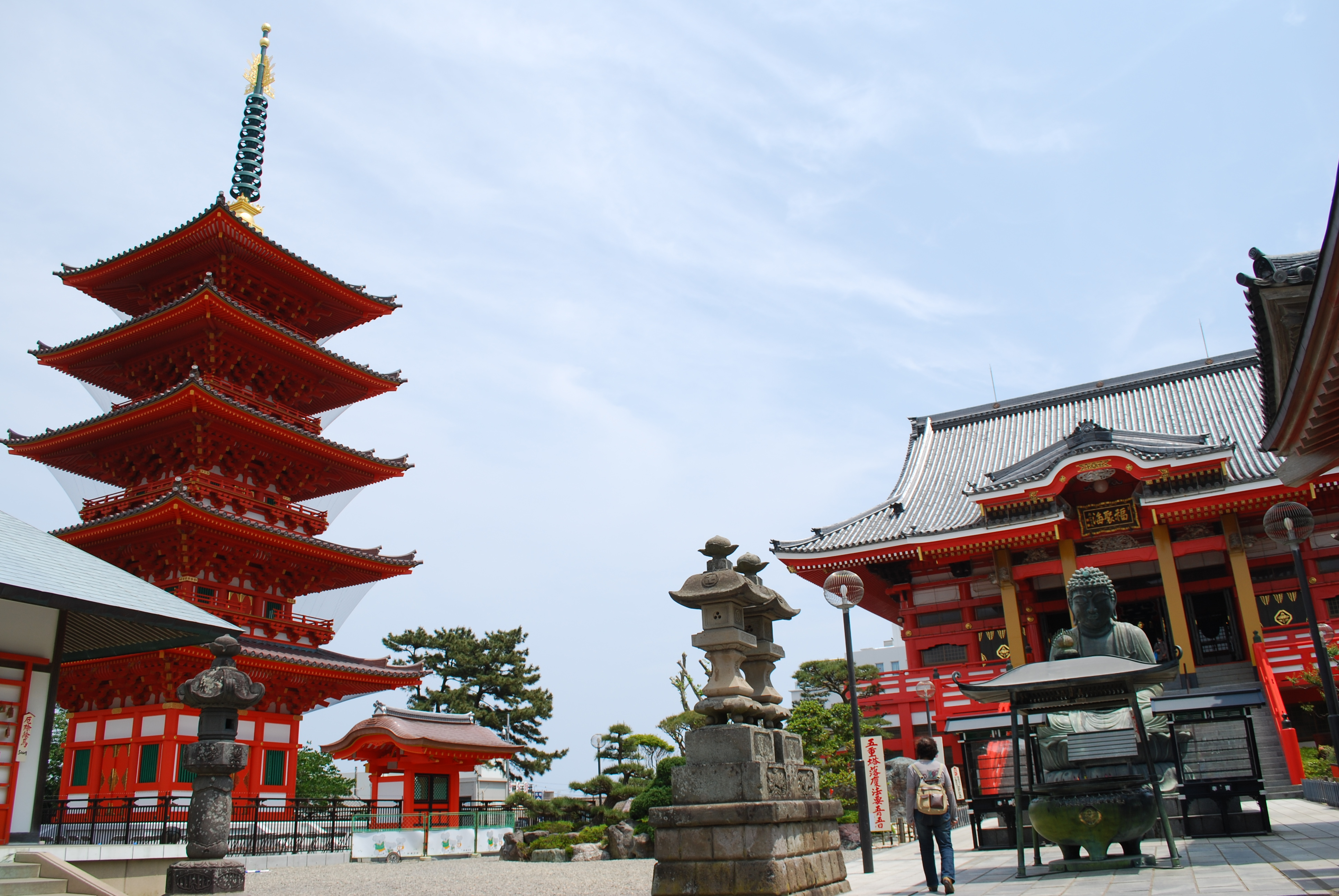
Enpuku-ji temple

Chōshi is home to Inubōsaki Lighthouse, completed in 1874 by Scotsman Richard Henry Brunton, as well as numerous historic temples, including Enpuku-ji and Mangan-ji.

== Sister cities ==
Chōshi has two sister cities:

- Coos Bay, Oregon, United States
- Legazpi, Albay, Philippines

== Notable people from Chōshi ==
- Hideyuki Kikuchi, author
- Doppo Kunikida, author
- Noboru Yasuda, author, scholar
- Eiji Okada, actor
- Yuma Suzuki, football player
- Takamiyama Torinosuke, sumo wrestler
