= Narita Line =

Railway line in Chiba prefecture, Japan

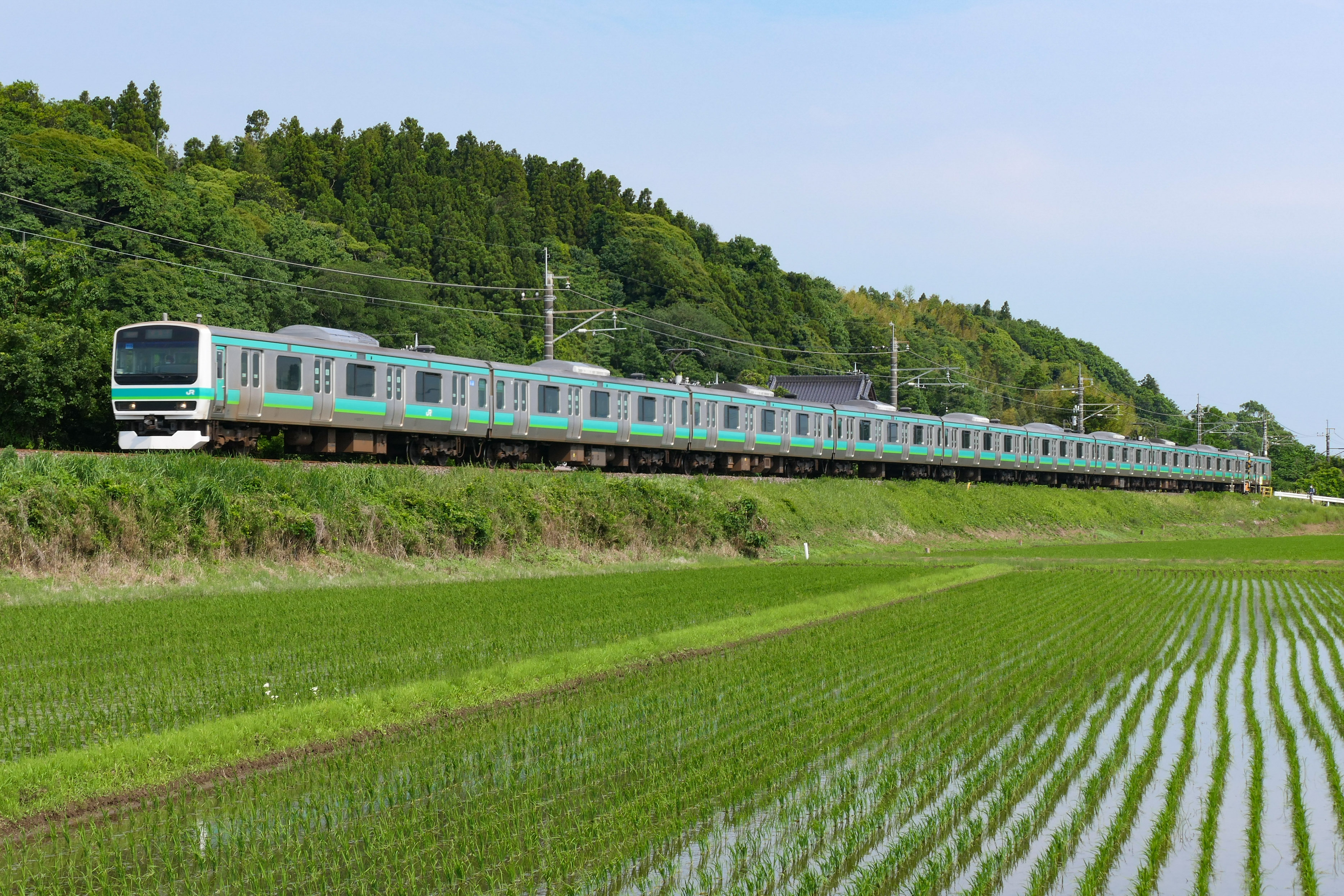
- An E231 series EMU on the Narita Line service in May 2021

Overview
- Native name: 成田線
- Owner: JR East; Airport branch: Narita Airport Rapid Railway Co., Ltd.
- Locale: Chiba Prefecture
- Termini: Sakura; Matsugishi
- Stations: Main line: 16; Airport branch: 3; Abiko branch: 10

Service
- Type: Heavy rail

History
- Opened: 19 January 1897; 129 years ago

Technical
- Track gauge: 1,067 mm (3 ft 6 in)
- Electrification: Overhead line, 1,500 V DC
Route map
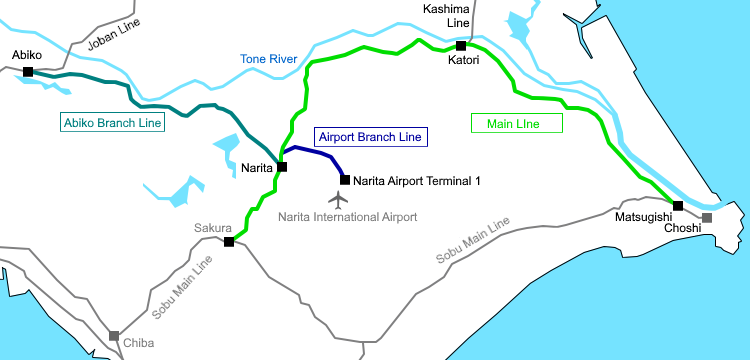

The Narita Line (Japanese: 成田線, romanized: Narita-sen) is the name for a combination of three railway lines located in Chiba Prefecture, Japan, operated by the East Japan Railway Company (JR East).

The main line connects Sakura Station and Matsugishi Station (as an alternate route to the Sōbu Main Line), and is sometimes referred to as the Samatsu Line (Japanese: 佐松線, romanized: Samatsu-sen). A branch line from Abiko Station to Narita Station is often called the Abiko Line (Japanese: 我孫子線, romanized: Abiko-sen), and a second branch, known as the Airport Line (Japanese: 空港線, romanized: Kūkō-sen) connects Narita to Narita Airport Terminal 1 Station. The first two lines are owned and operated by JR East; the Airport Line is owned by a separate company, Narita Airport Rapid Railway, which allows JR East and Keisei Railway to use the line for passenger services.

== Stations ==
=== Main line ===
Legend:

- ● : All trains stop
- | : All trains pass

All stations are located in Chiba Prefecture.

Line name	No.	Station	Japanese	Distance (km)	Rapid	Transfers	Location
Line name	No.	Station	Japanese	Distance (km)	Rapid	Transfers	Town/city
Sōbu Main Line	JO28	Chiba	千葉	From; Chiba; 0.0	●	Sōbu Line (Rapid) (JO28) (some through services); Chūō-Sōbu Line (JB39); ■ Sōbu Main Line; ■ Uchibō Line; ■ Sotobō Line; Chiba Urban Monorail Line 1, Line 2; Keisei Chiba Line (Keisei Chiba: KS59)	Chūō-ku
Sōbu Main Line	JO29	Higashi-Chiba	東千葉	0.9	|	■ Sōbu Main Line	Chūō-ku
Sōbu Main Line	JO30	Tsuga	都賀	4.2	●	Chiba Urban Monorail Line 2; ■ Sōbu Main Line	Wakaba-ku
Sōbu Main Line	JO31	Yotsukaidō	四街道	7.7	●	■ Sōbu Main Line	Yotsukaidō
Sōbu Main Line	JO32	Monoi	物井	11.9	●	■ Sōbu Main Line	Yotsukaidō
Sōbu Main Line	JO33	Sakura	佐倉	16.1	●	■ Sōbu Main Line (for Narutō)	Sakura
Narita Line	JO33	Sakura	佐倉	From; Sakura; 0.0	●	■ Sōbu Main Line (for Narutō)	Sakura
Narita Line	JO34	Shisui	酒々井	6.4	●		Shisui
Narita Line	JO35	Narita	成田	13.1	●	■ Airport branch line for Narita Airport Terminal 1; ■ Abiko branch line for Abiko; Keisei Main Line (Keisei Narita: KS40); Keisei Higashi-Narita Line (Keisei Narita: KS40)	Narita
Narita Line	—N/a	Kuzumi	久住	20.0			Narita
Narita Line	—N/a	Namegawa	滑河	25.5			Narita
Narita Line	—N/a	Shimōsa-Kōzaki	下総神崎	31.6			Kozaki
Narita Line	—N/a	Ōto	大戸	36.1			Katori
Narita Line	—N/a	Sawara	佐原	40.0		■ Kashima Line	Katori
Narita Line	—N/a	Katori	香取	43.6		■ Kashima Line	Katori
Narita Line	—N/a	Suigo	水郷	47.5			Katori
Narita Line	—N/a	Omigawa	小見川	52.7			Katori
Narita Line	—N/a	Sasagawa	笹川	57.7			Tonosho
Narita Line	—N/a	Shimōsa-Tachibana	下総橘	62.9			Tonosho
Narita Line	—N/a	Shimōsa-Toyosato	下総豊里	66.2			Chōshi
Narita Line	—N/a	Shiishiba	椎柴	71.0			Chōshi
Narita Line	—N/a	Matsugishi	松岸	75.4		■ Sōbu Main Line	Chōshi
Sōbu Main Line	—N/a	Matsugishi	松岸	From; Tokyo; 117.3		■ Sōbu Main Line	Chōshi
Sōbu Main Line	—N/a	Chōshi	銚子	120.5		Chōshi Electric Railway Line; ■ Sōbu Main Line	Chōshi

Note: Commuter Rapid service was discontinued on 12 March 2022.

=== Abiko branch line ===
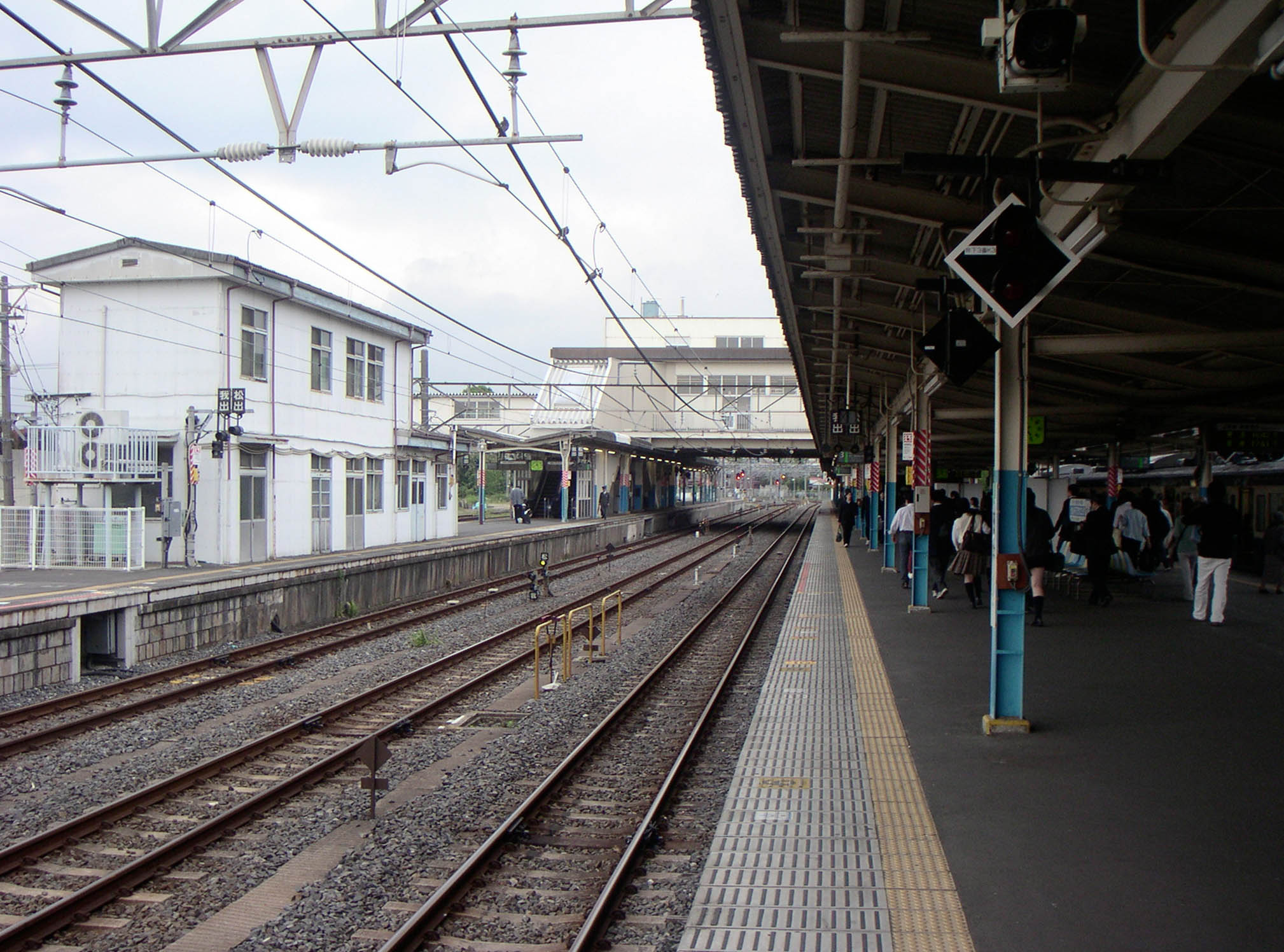
Narita Station in May 2005

All stations are in Chiba Prefecture.

Name	Japanese	Distance (km)	Transfers	Location
Name	Japanese	Distance (km)	Transfers	Town/city
Abiko	我孫子	0.0	Jōban Line (Rapid) (JJ08) (through service to Ueno or Shinagawa); Jōban Line (Local) (JL30)	Abiko
Higashi-Abiko	東我孫子	3.4		Abiko
Kohoku	湖北	6.3		Abiko
Araki	新木	8.9		Abiko
Fusa	布佐	12.1		Abiko
Kioroshi	木下	14.0		Inzai
Kobayashi	小林	18.3		Inzai
Ajiki	安食	23.2		Sakae
Shimōsa-Manzaki	下総松崎	27.3		Narita
Narita	成田	32.9	■ Narita Line (Main line, Airport branch line) (JO35); Keisei Lines (Keisei-Narita, as above)	Narita

=== Airport branch line ===
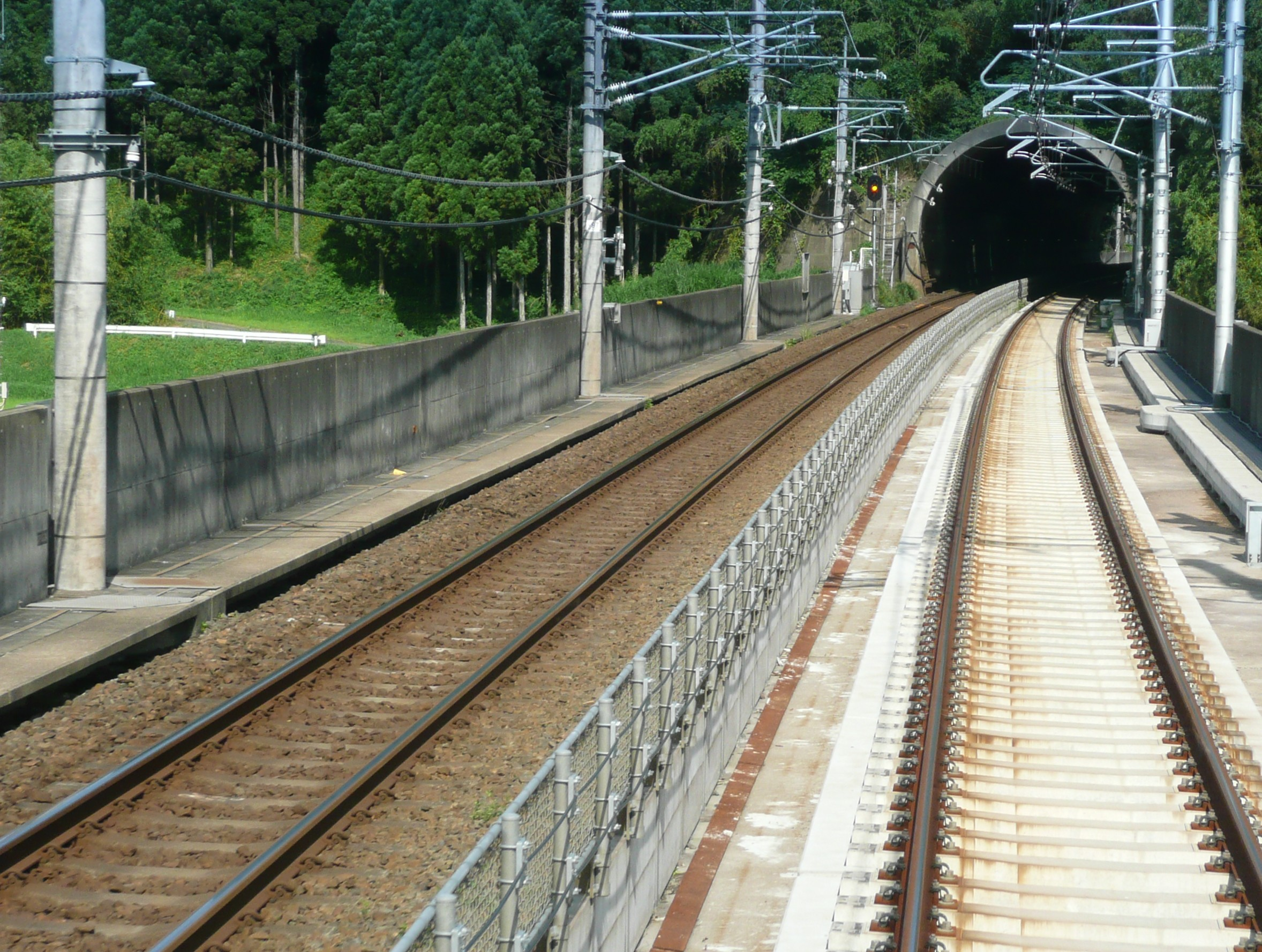
The Airport branch line (left) running alongside the 1,435 mm (4 ft 8 1/2 in) gauge Keisei Sky Access Line (right) in July 2010

All stations are in Narita, Chiba.

In accordance with Japan's Railway Business Act, JR East is a Category 2 operator between Narita Airport Terminal 1 and Narita while the track and related facilities are owned by Narita Airport Rapid Railway Co., Ltd. as a Category 3 railway business.

No.	Name	Japanese	Distance (km)	Transfers
JO35	Narita	成田	0.0	■ Narita Line Main line for Chiba (through services) and for Chōshi; ■ Abiko branch line for Abiko; Keisei Main Line (Keisei Narita: KS40); Keisei Higashi-Narita Line (Keisei Narita: KS40)
JO36	Narita Airport Terminal 2·3	空港第２ビル	9.8	Keisei Main Line (KS41); Narita Sky Access Line (KS41)
JO37	Narita Airport Terminal 1	成田空港	10.8	Keisei Main Line (KS42); Narita Sky Access Line (KS42)

== Services ==
=== Main line and Airport branch line ===
Narita Express trains travel on the Narita Line but stop only at Narita Airport Terminal 2·3 and Narita Airport Terminal 1 stations, except during morning and evening rush hours when some trains stop at Narita Station.

Rapid commuter trains run between Tokyo and Narita Airport Terminal 1, stopping at all stations between Tsuga and Narita Airport Terminal 1.

=== Abiko branch line ===
All services on the Abiko branch line are local trains stopping at all stations. Some trains travel through onto the Jōban Line (Rapid) to Ueno and Shinagawa.

== Rolling stock ==
Local service

- E131 series EMUs (since 13 March 2021, on Kashima Line through services)
- 209-2000/2100 series EMUs

Abiko Branch Line, Jōban Line through service

- E231 series EMUs

Sōbu Line (Rapid) through service

- E235-1000 series EMUs

Narita Express

- E259 series EMUs

=== Since 2027 ===
Local service

- E131 series EMUs 2-car (since 13 March 2021, on Kashima Line through services)
- E131 series EMUs 3-car and 6-car (since 2027 - excluding Abiko Branch Line）
- E233 series EMUs 6-car (since 2027 - excluding Abiko Branch Line）
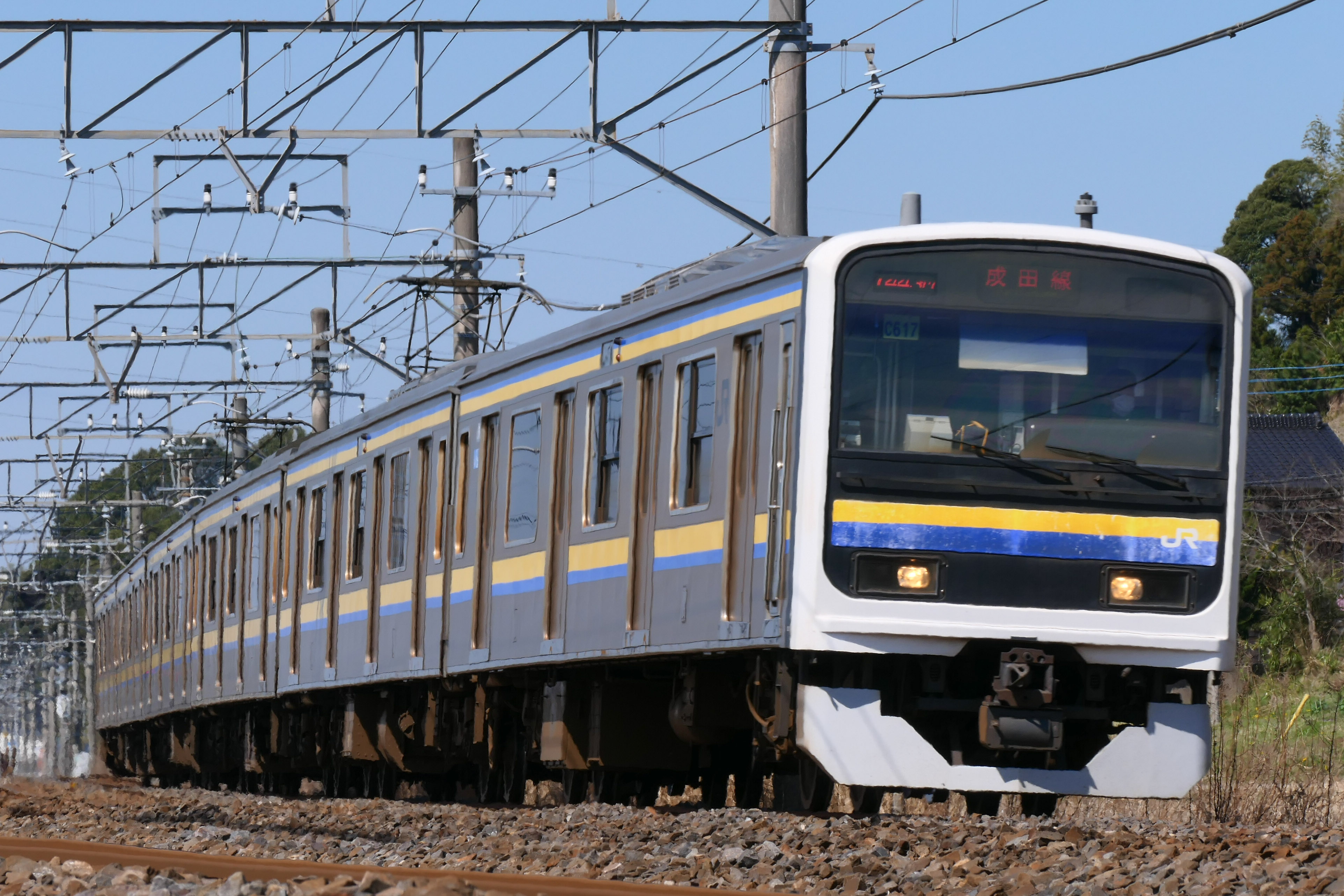
A 209-2100 series EMU in March 2021

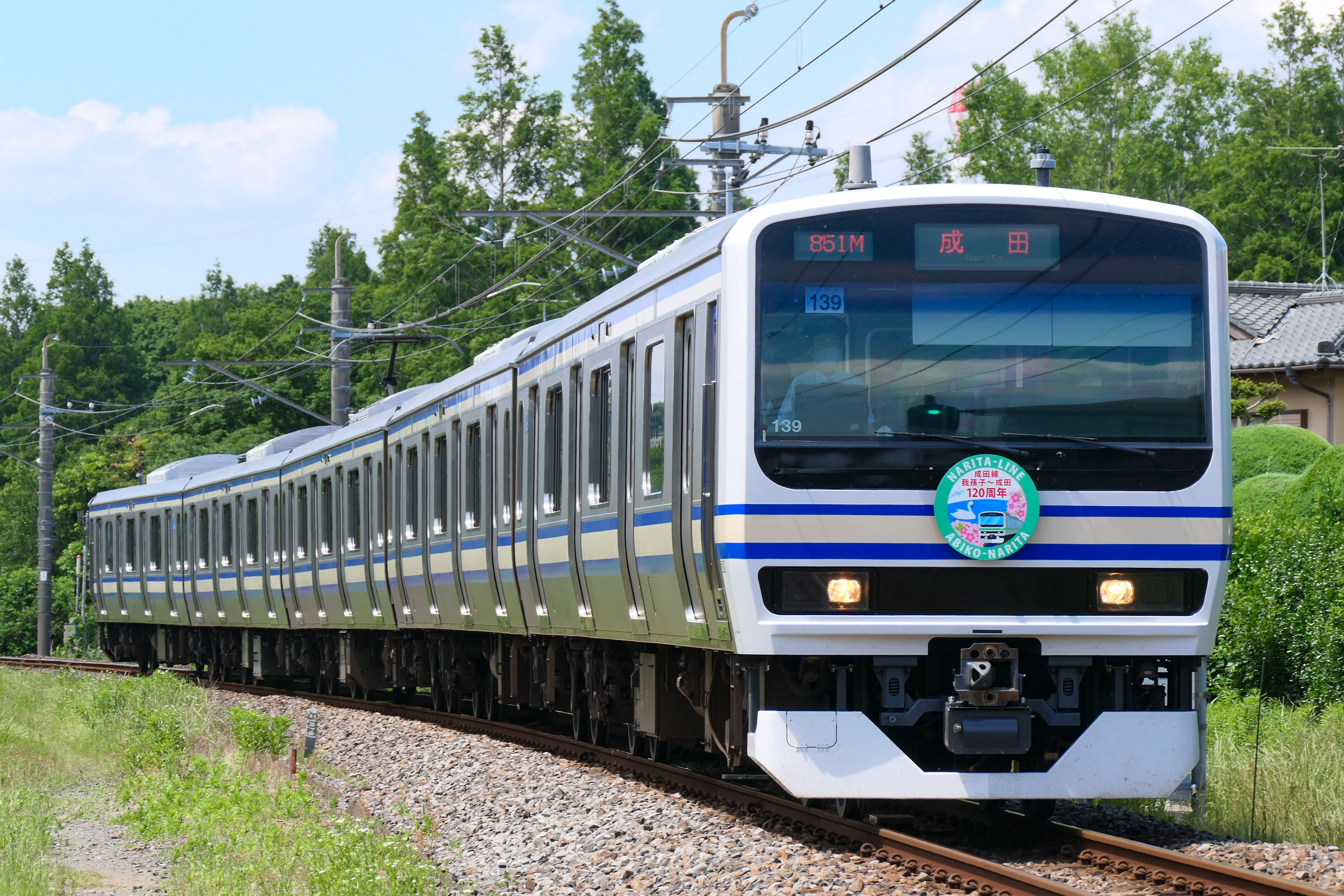
An E231 series EMU in May 2021

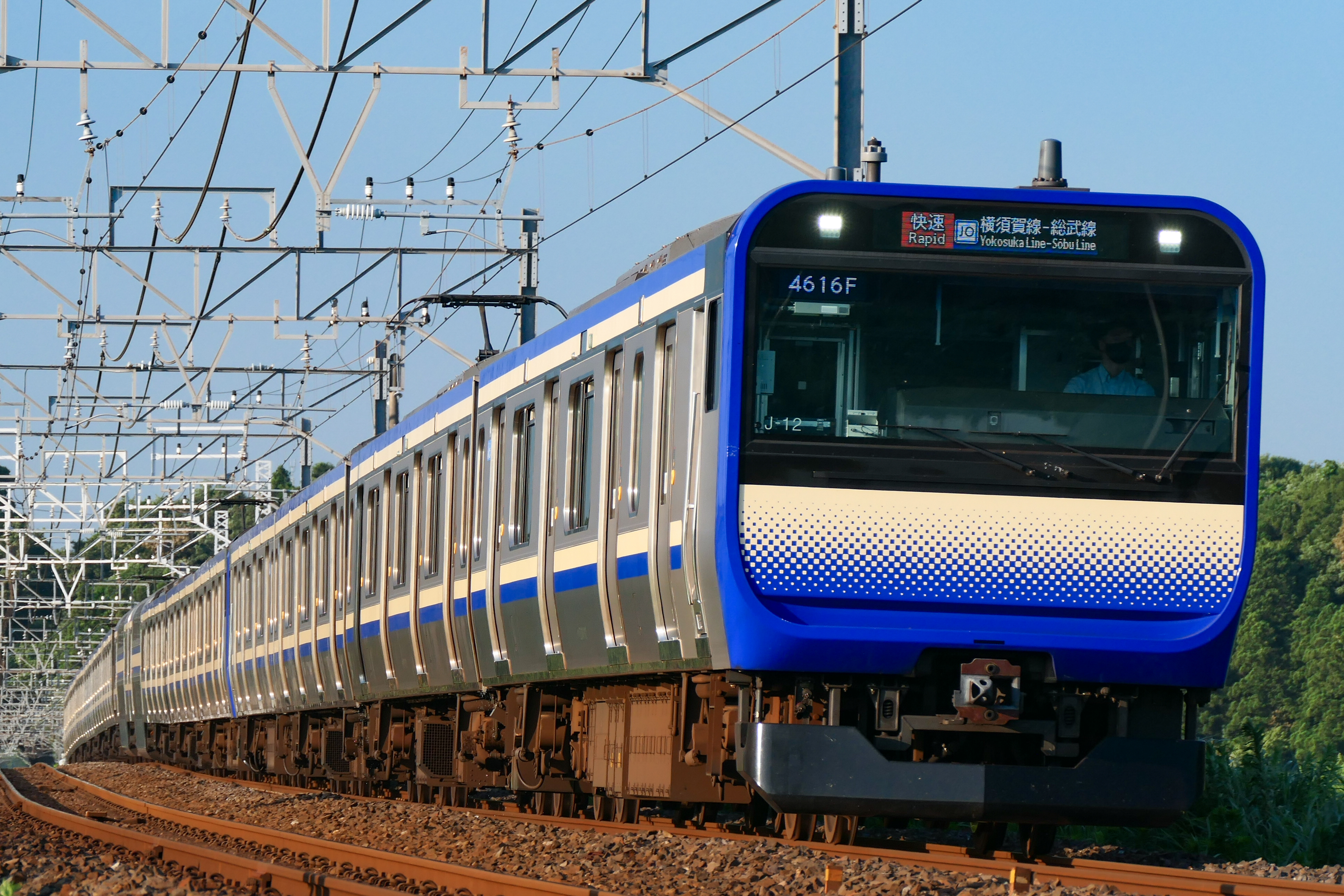
An E235-1000 series EMU in June 2022

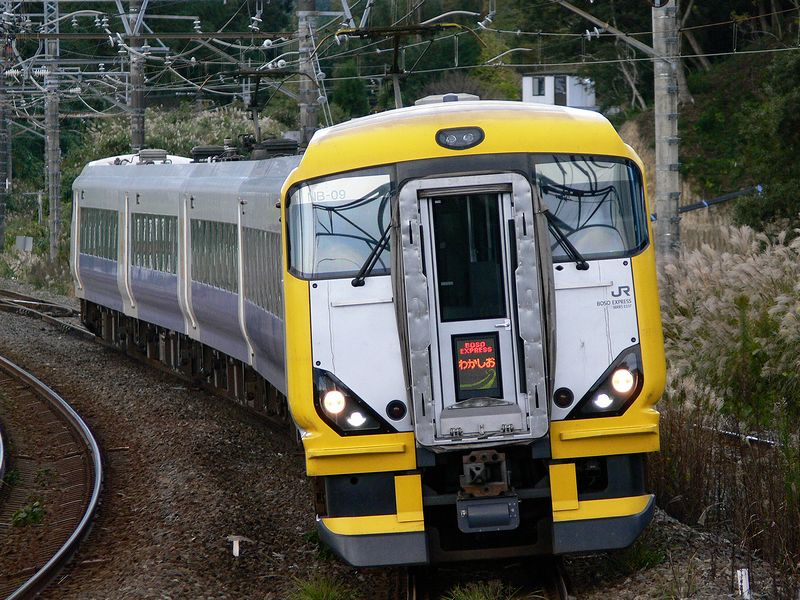
An E257-500 series EMU in November 2006

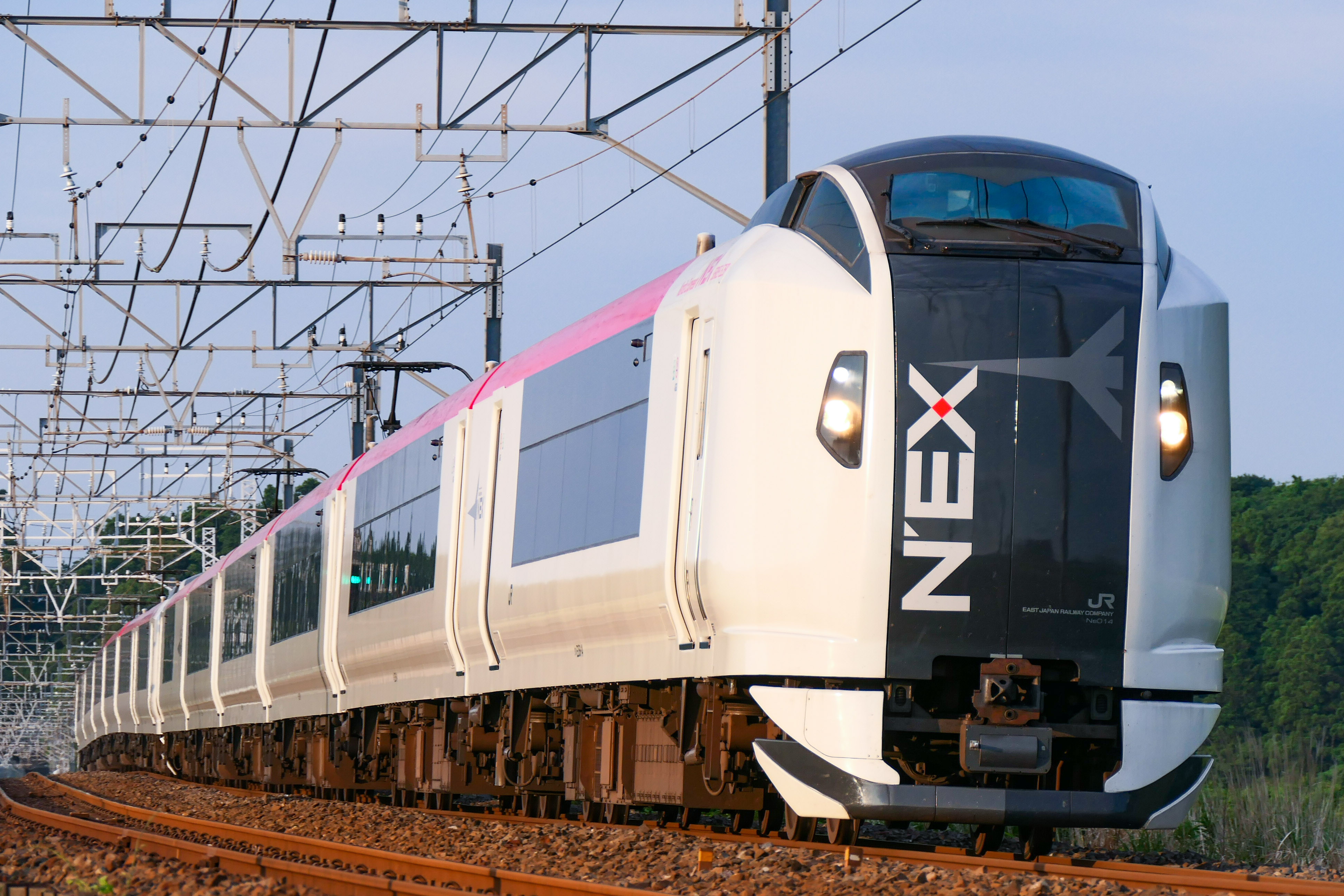
An E259 series EMU in May 2021

=== Past ===
- E217 series EMUs (until March 2025)
- 103 series EMUs (Abiko branch line services until March 2006)
- 113 series EMUs (until September 2011)
- 183 series EMUs (Ayame limited express services)
- 211-3000 series EMUs (local services since 21 October 2006 until March 2013)
- 253 series EMUs (Narita Express limited express services until June 2010)
- E257-500 series (Ayame limited express services)
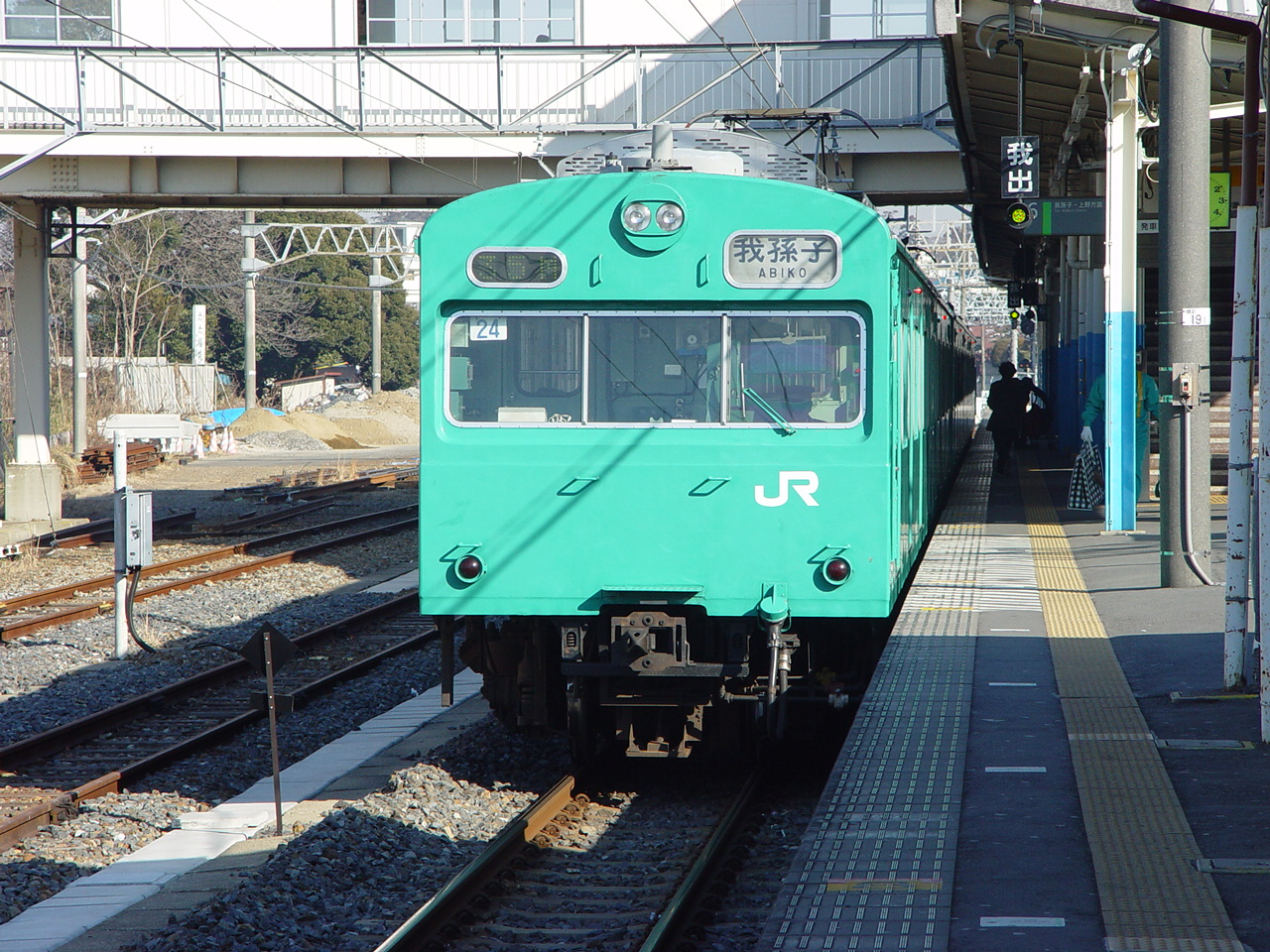
A 103 series EMU in January 2003

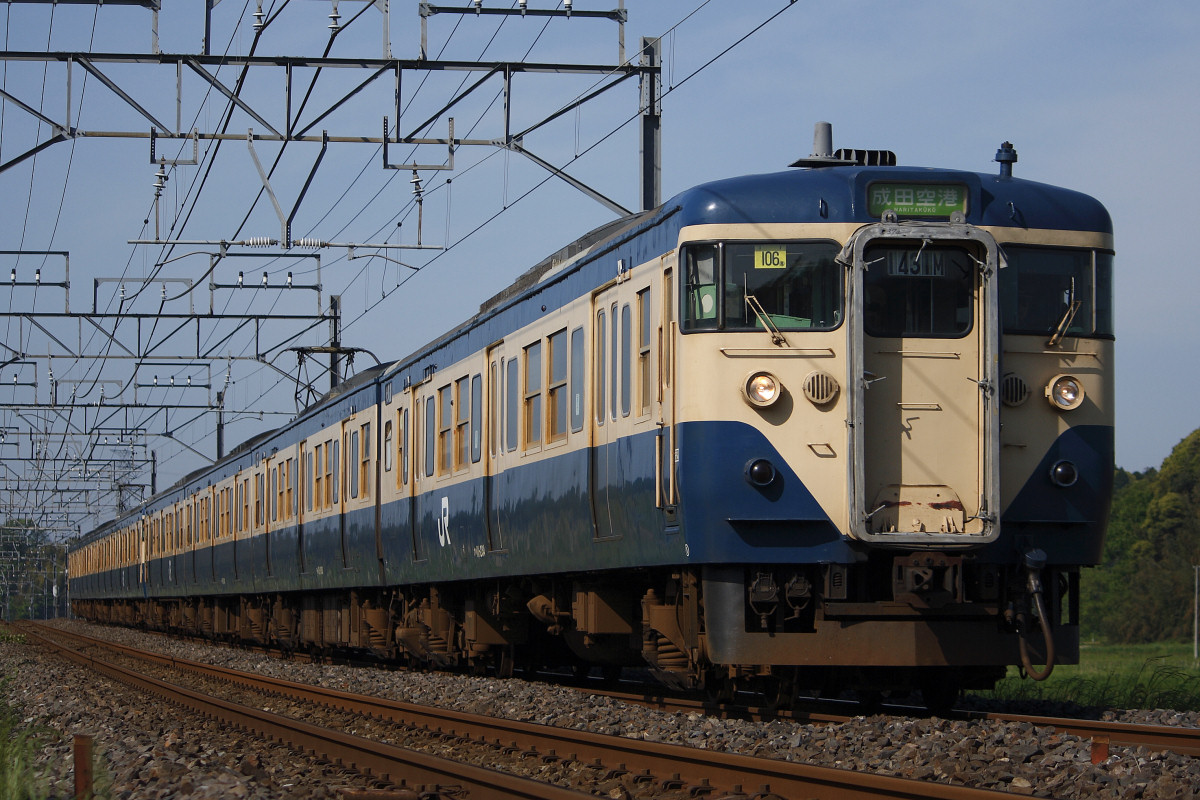
A 113 series EMU in May 2010

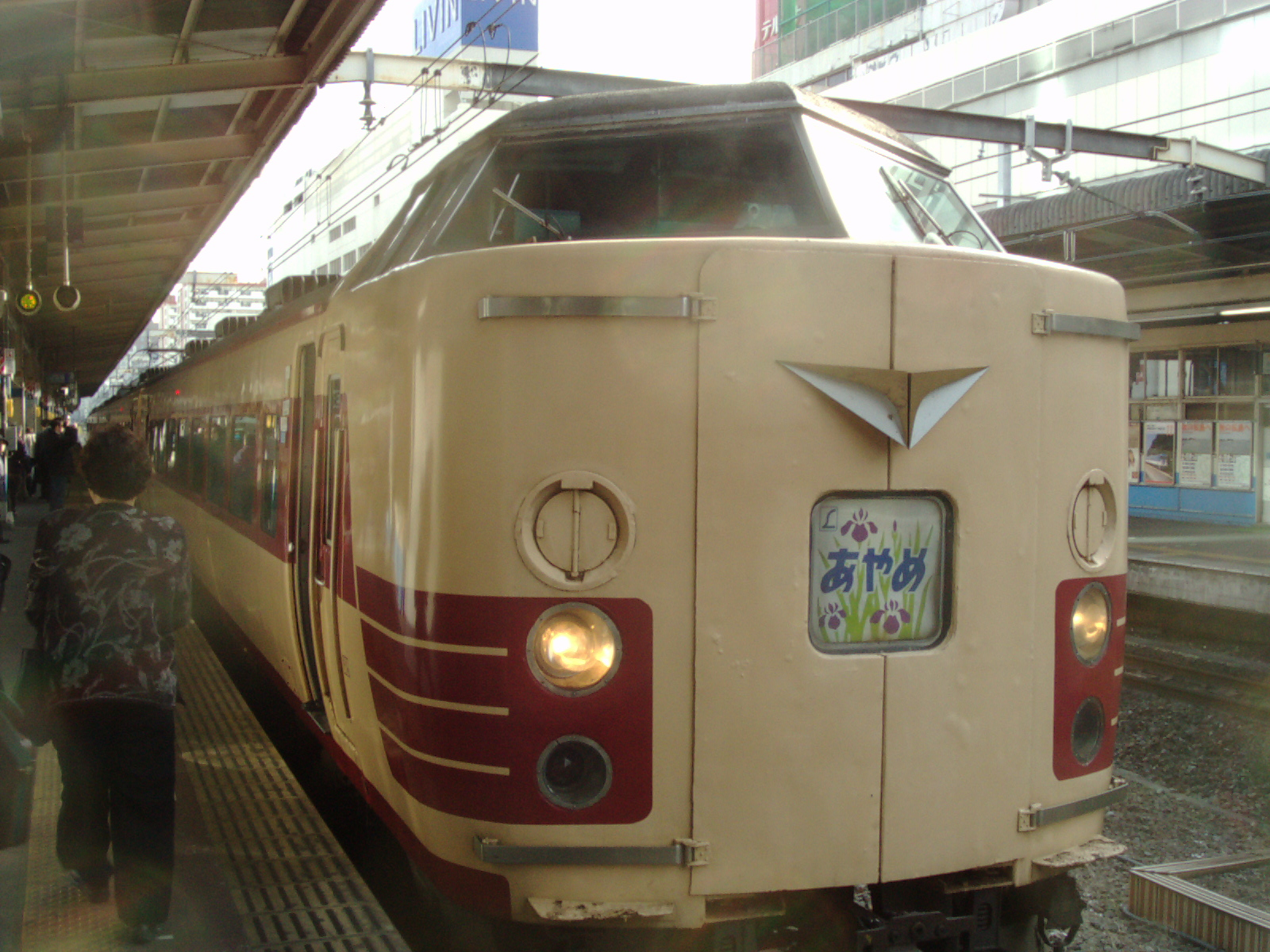
A 183 series EMU on an Ayame service in November 2005

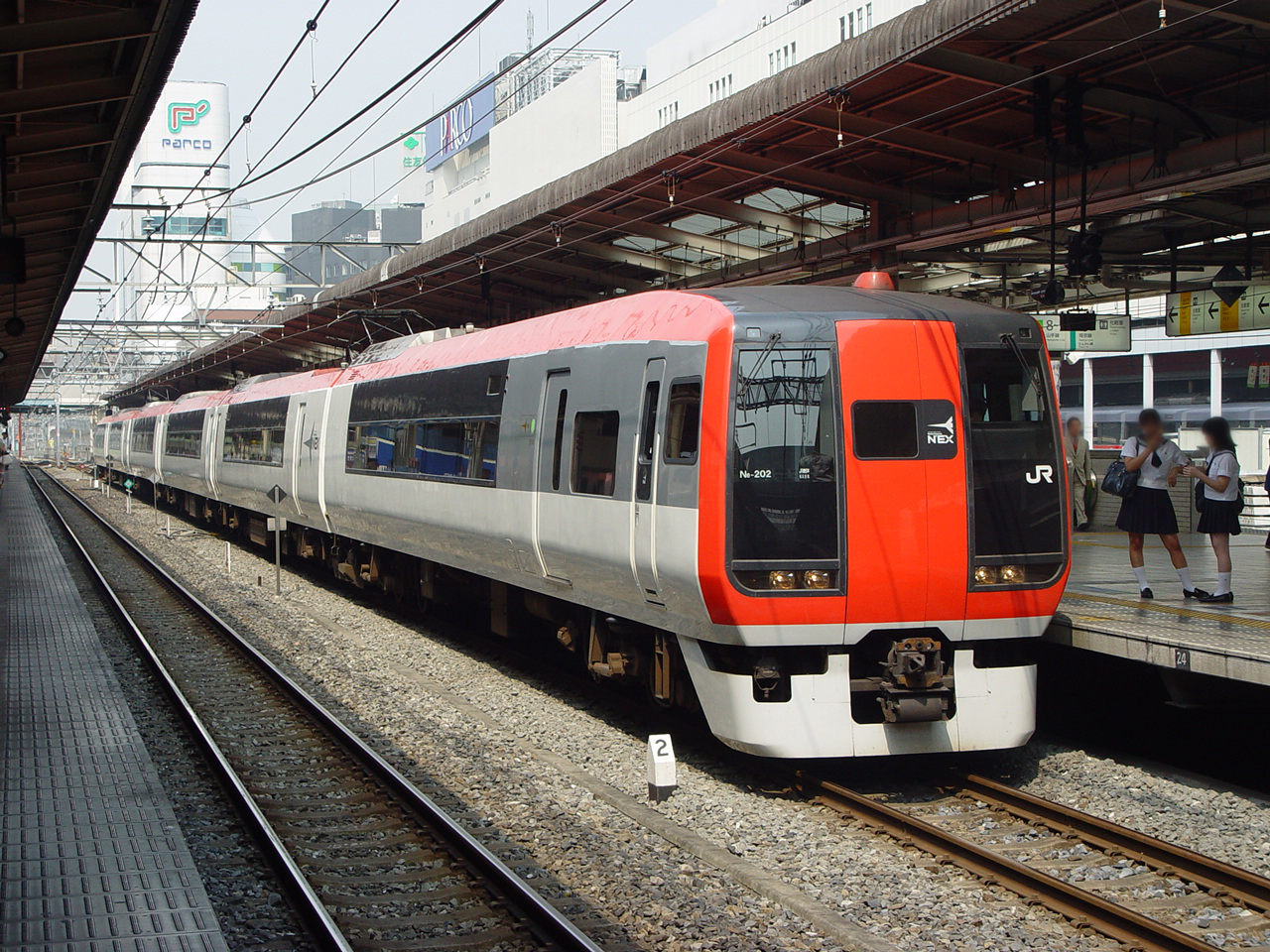
A 253 series EMU on a Narita Express service in August 2003

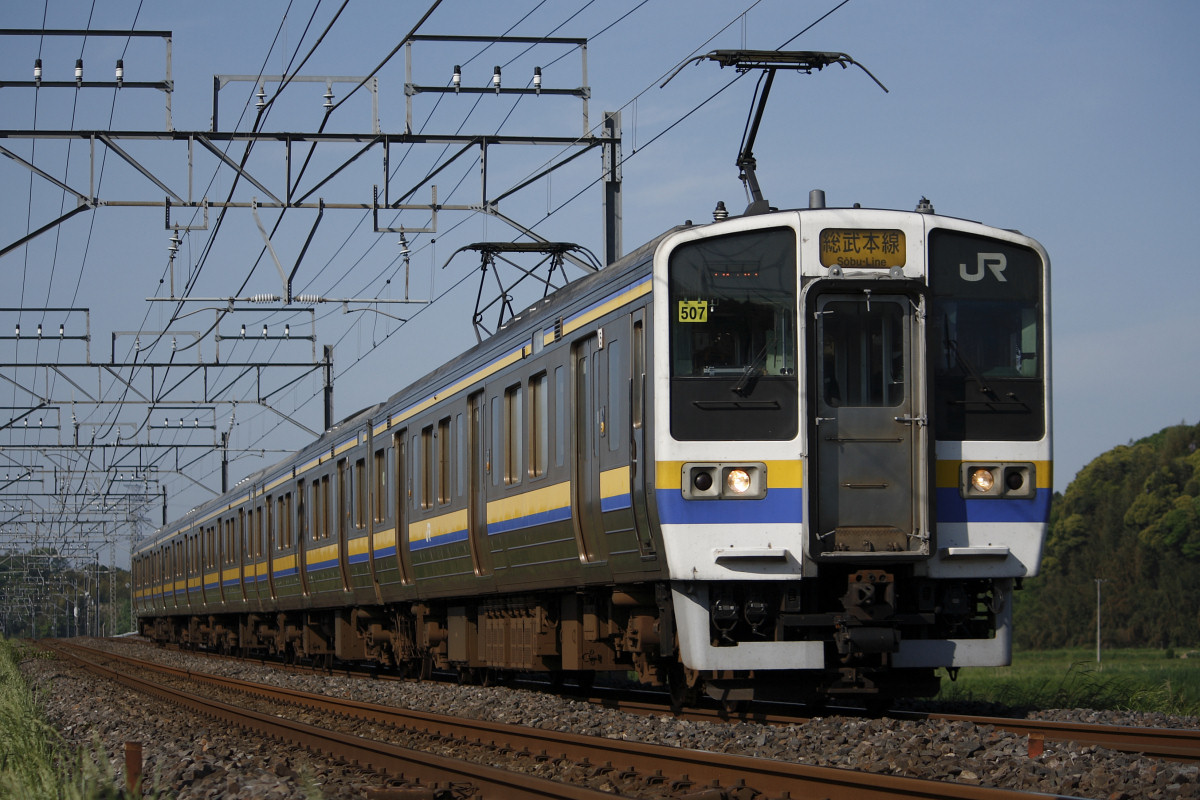
211-3000 series EMU, May 2010

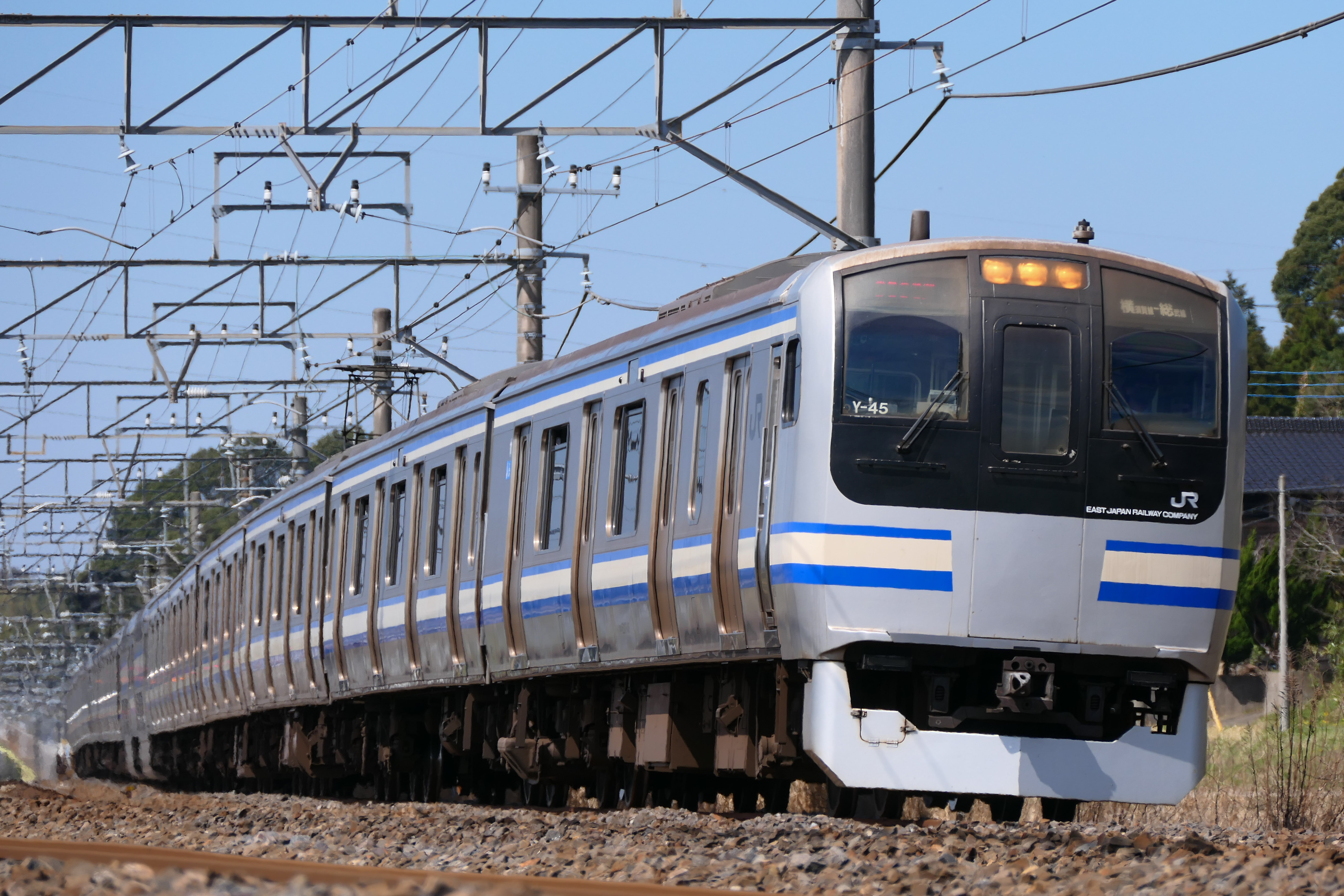
An E217 series EMU in March 2021

== History ==
The Sakura – Narita – Namegawa section of the line was opened on 19 January 1897, by Sobu Railway, extended to Sawara the following year. The Narita to Abiko branch opened in 1901. The company was nationalised in 1920, and the Sawara to Matsugishi section opened between 1931 and 1933.

The Sakura to Narita section was electrified (at 1,500 V DC overhead) in 1968. The Abiko branch was electrified from 1 October 1973. The Narita to Matsugishi section was electrified in 1974, and freight services ceased between 1984 and 1986.

The Sakura to Narita section was double-tracked in 1986, and the Airport branch opened in 1991 as an electrified, CTC-signalled line.

== Accidents ==
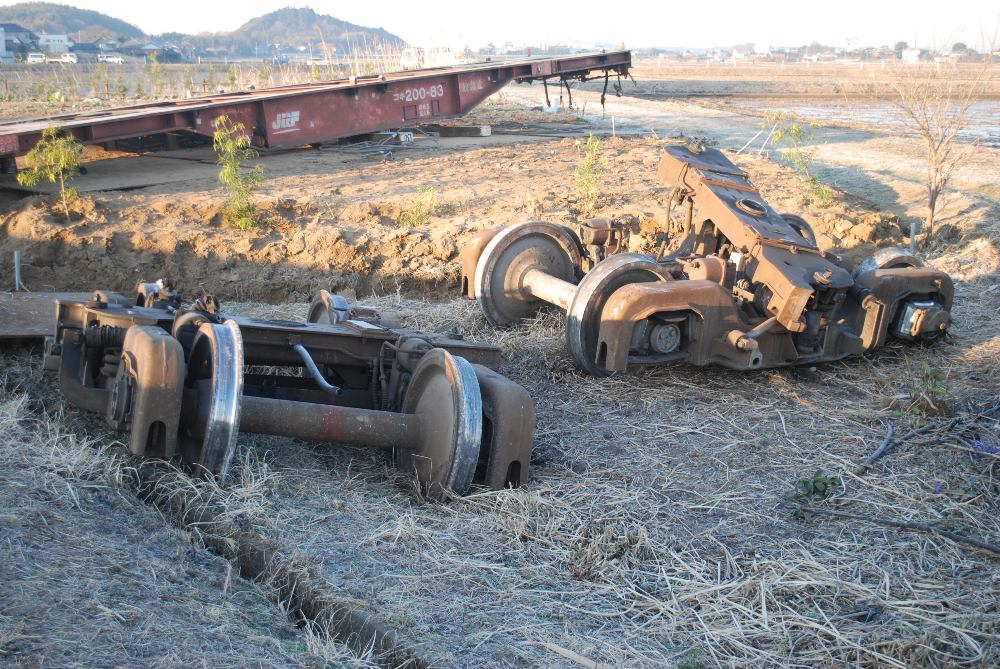
Derailed wagons near Namegawa Station, March 2011

In the early hours of 10 March 2011, a day before 2011 Tōhoku earthquake and tsunami occurred, a freight train carrying ethylene oxide derailed and overturned on the Narita Line near Namegawa Station.
