= Higashi-Chiba Station =

Railway station in Chiba, Japan

JO29 Higashi-Chiba Station 東千葉駅
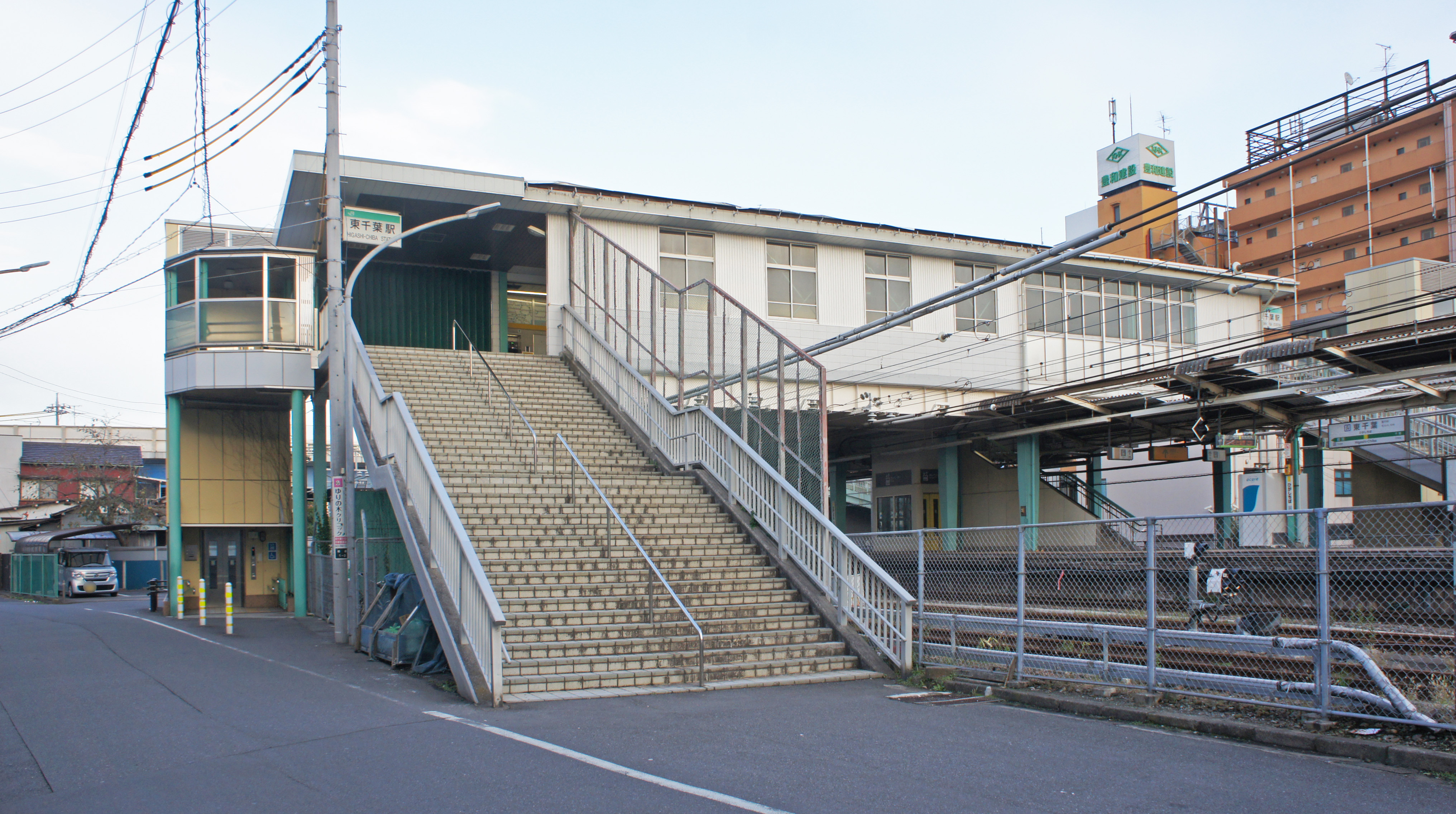
- Station north exit, December 2019

General information
- Location: 1-10 Kanamechō, Chūō-ku, Chiba-shi, Chiba-ken 260-0007; Japan
- Coordinates: 35°37′0.41″N 140°7′19.78″E
- Operator: JR East
- Line: ■ Sōbu Main Line
- Distance: 40.1 km from Tokyo
- Platforms: 1 island platform

Other information
- Status: Staffed
- Station code: JO29
- Website: Official website

History
- Opened: December 20, 1965

Passengers
- FY2019: 2646

Services
Preceding station	JR East	Following station
Chiba JO28 Terminus	Sōbu Main / Narita lines Local	Tsuga JO30 towards Chōshi, Abiko or Narita Airport Terminal 1
Location
- Location within Chiba Prefecture Location within Japan

Higashi-Chiba Station (東千葉駅, Higashi-Chiba-eki) is a passenger railway station located in Chūō-ku, Chiba, Chiba Prefecture, Japan, operated by East Japan Railway Company (JR East).

== Lines ==
Higashi-Chiba Station is served by the Sōbu Main Line, and is located 40.1 km from the western terminus of the line at Tokyo Station.

== Station layout ==
The station consists of one island platform with an elevated station building located above the platform and tracks. The station is staffed.

=== Platforms ===
1	■ Sōbu Main Line	For Chiba, Tokyo
2	■ Sōbu Main Line	Narita, Sawara, Chōshi, Kashima-Jingū

== History ==
Higashi-Chiba Station was opened on December 20, 1965 on the location of a former switchback located near the Chiba City Public Assembly Hall. The station was absorbed into the JR East network upon the privatization of the Japan National Railways (JNR) on April 1, 1987.

== Passenger statistics ==
In fiscal 2019, the station was used by an average of 2,646 passengers daily (boarding passengers only).

== Surrounding area ==
- Chiba Civic Hall
- Sakaemachi Street
- Chiba Park

== See also ==
- List of railway stations in Japan
