= Sasagawa Station =

Railway station in Tōnoshō, Chiba Prefecture, Japan

Sasagawa Station 笹川駅
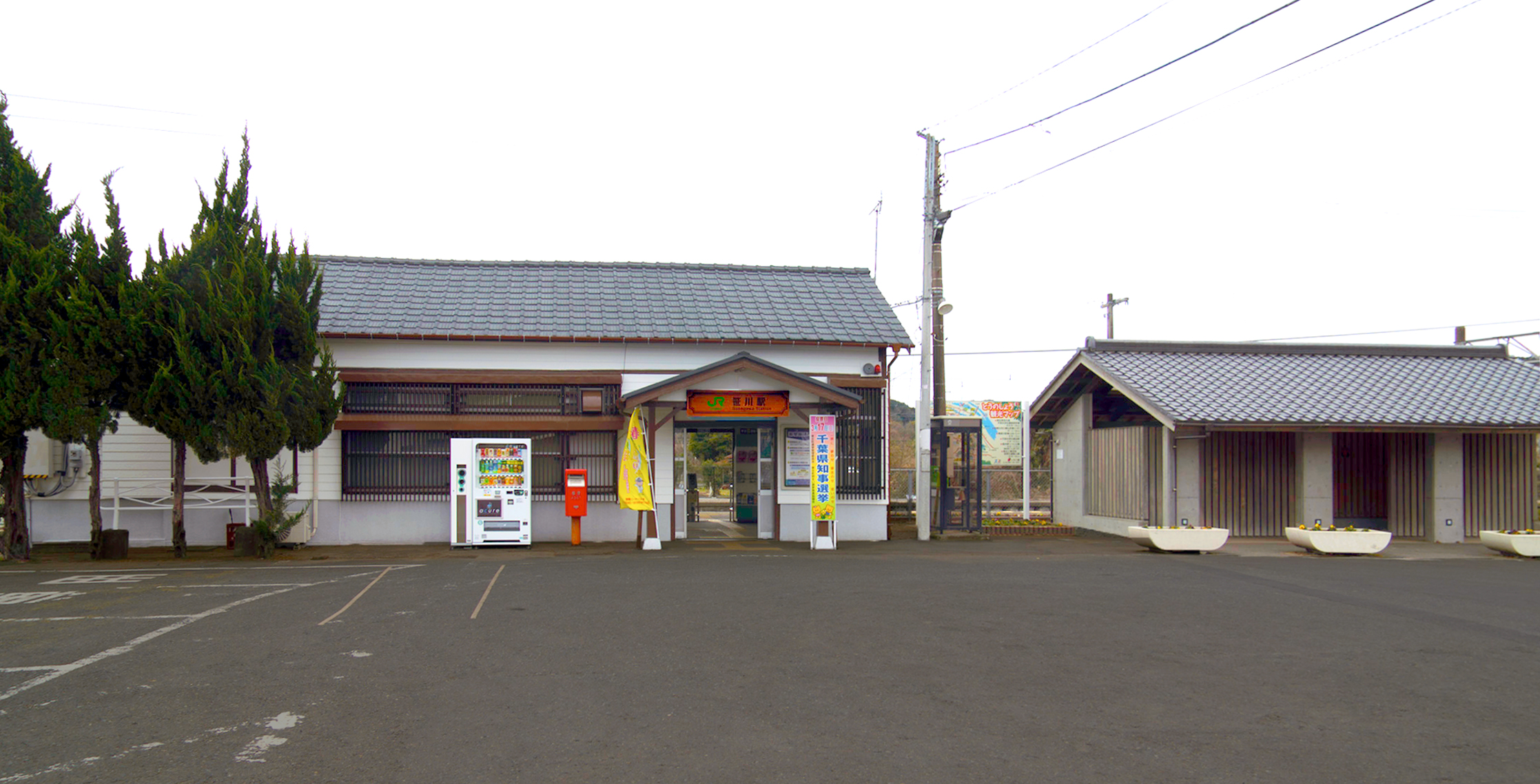
- Sasagawa Station in March 2013

General information
- Location: Sasagawa I 625, Tōnoshō-machi Katori-gun, Chiba-ken 289-0601; Japan
- Coordinates: 35.8396°N 140.6558°E
- Operator: JR East
- Line: ■ Narita Line
- Distance: 57.7 km from Sakura
- Platforms: 2 side platforms

Other information
- Status: Staffed
- Website: Official website

History
- Opened: November 10, 1931

Passengers
- FY2019: 318

Services
Preceding station	JR East	Following station
Omigawa towards Chiba	Narita Line	Shimōsa-Tachibana towards Chōshi
Location
- Location within Chiba Prefecture Location within Japan

Sasakawa Station (笹川駅, Sasakawa-eki) is a passenger railway station in the town of Tōnoshō, Chiba Prefecture, Japan, operated by the East Japan Railway Company (JR East).

== Lines ==
Sasakawa Station is served by the Narita Line, and is located 57.7 kilometers from the terminus of line at Sakura Station.

== Station layout ==
The station consists of dual opposed side platforms connected by a footbridge to a wooden, single-story station building. The station is staffed.

=== Platforms ===
1	■ Narita Line	For Chōshi
2	■ Narita Line	For Sawara, Narita, Sakura, Chiba

== History ==
Sasakawa Station was opened on November 10, 1931 as a station on the Japanese Government Railway (JGR) for both freight and passenger operations. At the time, it was the terminal station for the Narita Line, until the line was extended to Matsugishi on March 11, 1933. After World War II, the JGR became the Japan National Railways (JNR). Scheduled freight operations were suspended from October 1, 1962. The station was absorbed into the JR East network upon the privatization of the Japan National Railways (JNR) on April 1, 1987.

== Passenger statistics ==
In fiscal 2019, the station was used by an average of 318 passengers daily (boarding passengers only).

== Surrounding area ==
- National Route 356
- Tonosho Town Hall
- Tonosho Post Office

== See also ==
- List of railway stations in Japan
