= Shimōsa-Toyosato Station =

Railway station in Chōshi, Chiba Prefecture, Japan

Shimōsa-Toyosato Station 下総豊里駅
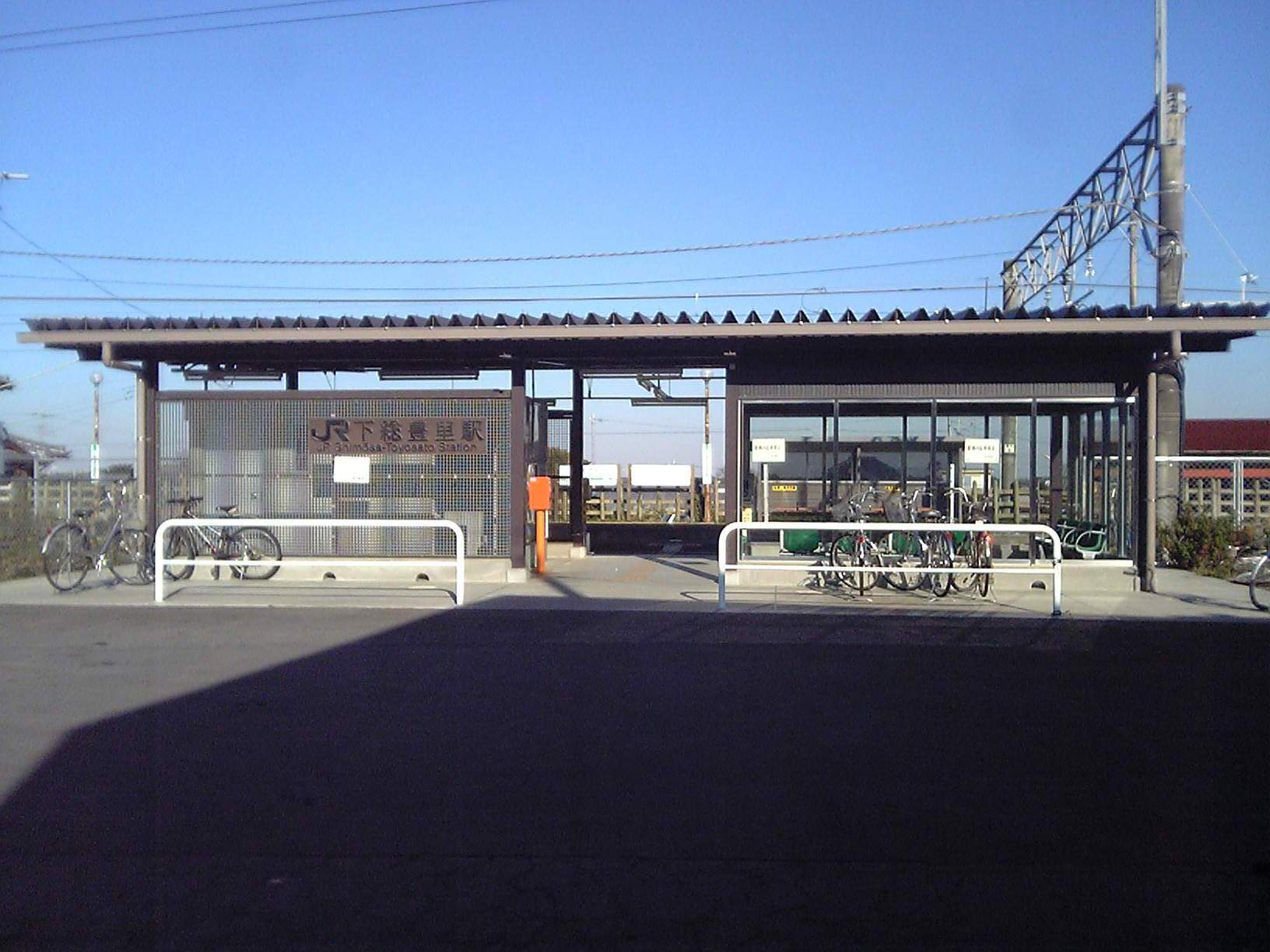
- Shimōsa-Toyosato Station, December 2009

General information
- Location: Sasamoto-chō 73-4, Chōshi-shi, Chiba-ken 288-0873; Japan
- Coordinates: 35.7928°N 140.7208°E
- Operator: JR East
- Line: ■ Narita Line
- Distance: 66.2 km from Sakura
- Platforms: 2 side platforms

Other information
- Status: Unstaffed
- Website: Official website

History
- Opened: March 11, 1933

Passengers
- FY2006: 171

Services
Preceding station	JR East	Following station
Shimōsa-Tachibana towards Chiba	Narita Line	Shiishiba towards Chōshi
Location
- Location within Chiba Prefecture Location within Japan

Shimōsa-Toyosato Station (下総豊里駅, Shimōsa-Toyosato-eki) is a passenger railway station in the city of Chōshi, Chiba, Japan, operated by the East Japan Railway Company (JR East).

== Lines ==
Shimōsa-Toyosato Station is served by the Narita Line, and is located 66.2 kilometers from the terminus of line at Sakura Station.

== Station layout ==
The station consists of dual opposed side platforms connected by a footbridge to a wooden, single-story station building. The station is unattended.

=== Platforms ===
1	■ Narita Line	For Chōshi
2	■ Narita Line	For Sawara, Narita, Sakura, Chiba

== History ==
Shimōsa-Toyosato Station was opened on March 11, 1933 as a station on the Japanese Government Railway (JGR) for both freight and passenger operations. After World War II, the JGR became the Japan National Railways (JNR). Scheduled freight operations were suspended from October 1, 1971. The station has been unattended since March 1, 1985. The station was absorbed into the JR East network upon the privatization of the Japan National Railways (JNR) on April 1, 1987. The station building was rebuilt in 2008.

== Passenger statistics ==
In fiscal 2006, the station was used by an average of 171 passengers daily.

== Surrounding area ==
- National Route 356
- Chōshi City Hall Toyosato Branch Office
- Chōshi Municipal No. 7 Junior High School
- Toyosato Elementary School, Choshi City

== See also ==
- List of railway stations in Japan
