= Omigawa Station =

Railway station in Katori, Chiba Prefecture, Japan

Omigawa Station 小見川駅
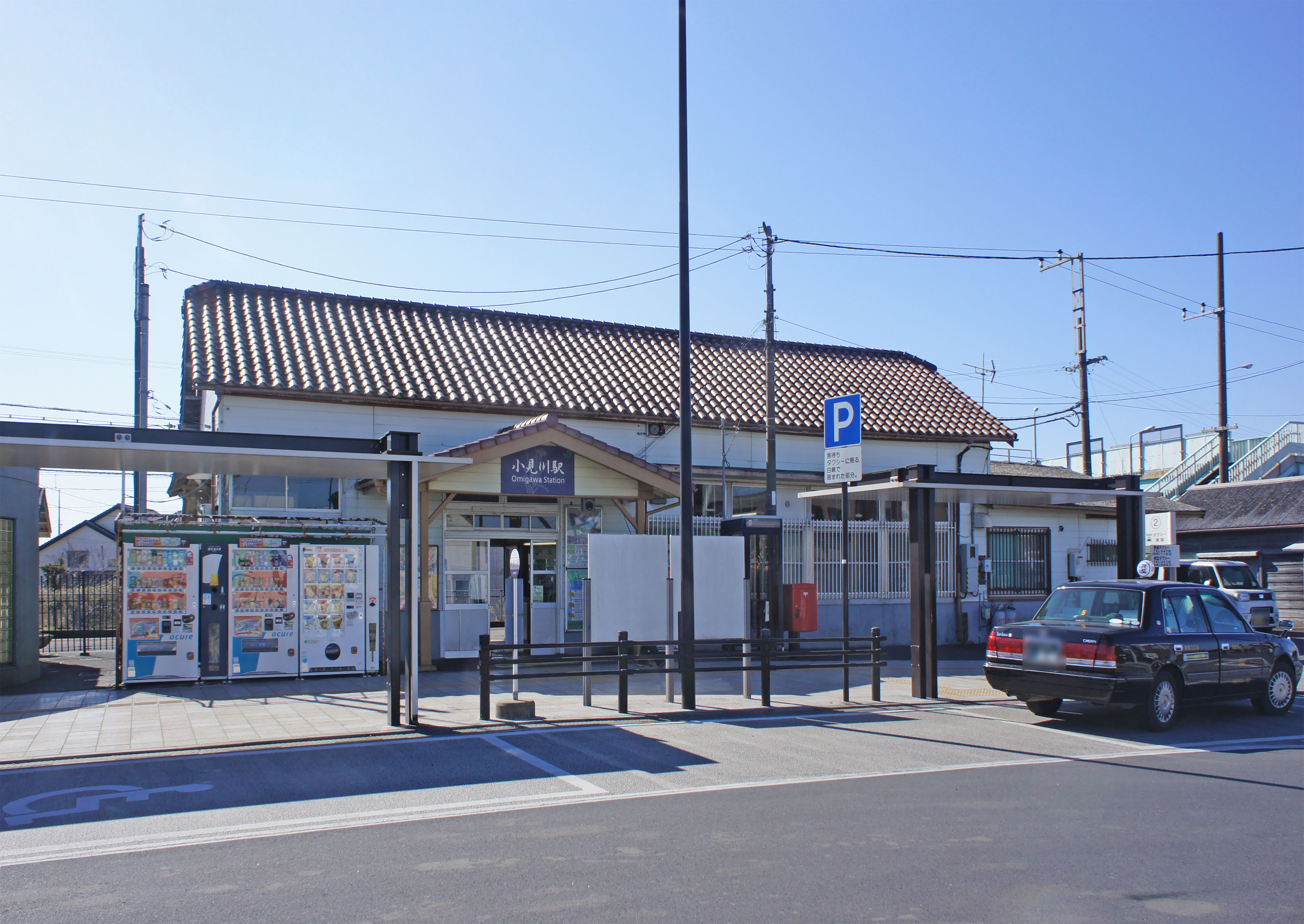
- Omigawa Station building

General information
- Location: Omigawa 1316, Katori-shi, Chiba-ken 289-0313; Japan
- Coordinates: 35.8499°N 140.6045°E
- Operator: JR East
- Line: ■ Narita Line
- Distance: 52.7 km from Sakura
- Platforms: 2 side platforms

Other information
- Status: Staffed (Midori no Madoguchi)
- Website: Official website

History
- Opened: November 10, 1931

Passengers
- FY2019: 1182

Services
Preceding station	JR East	Following station
Suigo towards Chiba	Narita Line	Sasagawa towards Chōshi
Location
- Location within Chiba Prefecture Location within Japan

Omigawa Station (小見川駅, Omigawa-eki) a passenger railway station in the city of Katori, Chiba Japan, operated by the East Japan Railway Company (JR East).

== Lines ==
Omigawa Station is served by the Narita Line, and is located 52.7 kilometers from the terminus of line at Sakura Station.

== Layout ==
The station consists of dual opposed side platforms connected by a footbridge to a wooden, single-story station building. The station has a Midori no Madoguchi staffed ticket office.

=== Platforms ===
1	■ Narita Line	For Chōshi
2	■ Narita Line	For Sawara, Narita, Sakura, Chiba

== History ==
Omigawa Station was opened on November 10, 1931 as a station on the Japanese Government Railway (JGR) for both freight and passenger operations. After World War II, the JGR became the Japan National Railways (JNR). Scheduled freight operations were suspended from February 1, 1974. The station was absorbed into the JR East network upon the privatization of the Japan National Railways (JNR) on April 1, 1987.

== Passenger statistics ==
In fiscal 2019, the station was used by an average of 1,185 passengers daily (boarding passengers only).

== Surrounding area ==
- National Route 356
- Tone River
- Omigawa High School

== See also ==
- List of railway stations in Japan
