= Tōnoshō, Chiba =

Tōnoshō 東庄町
- Town
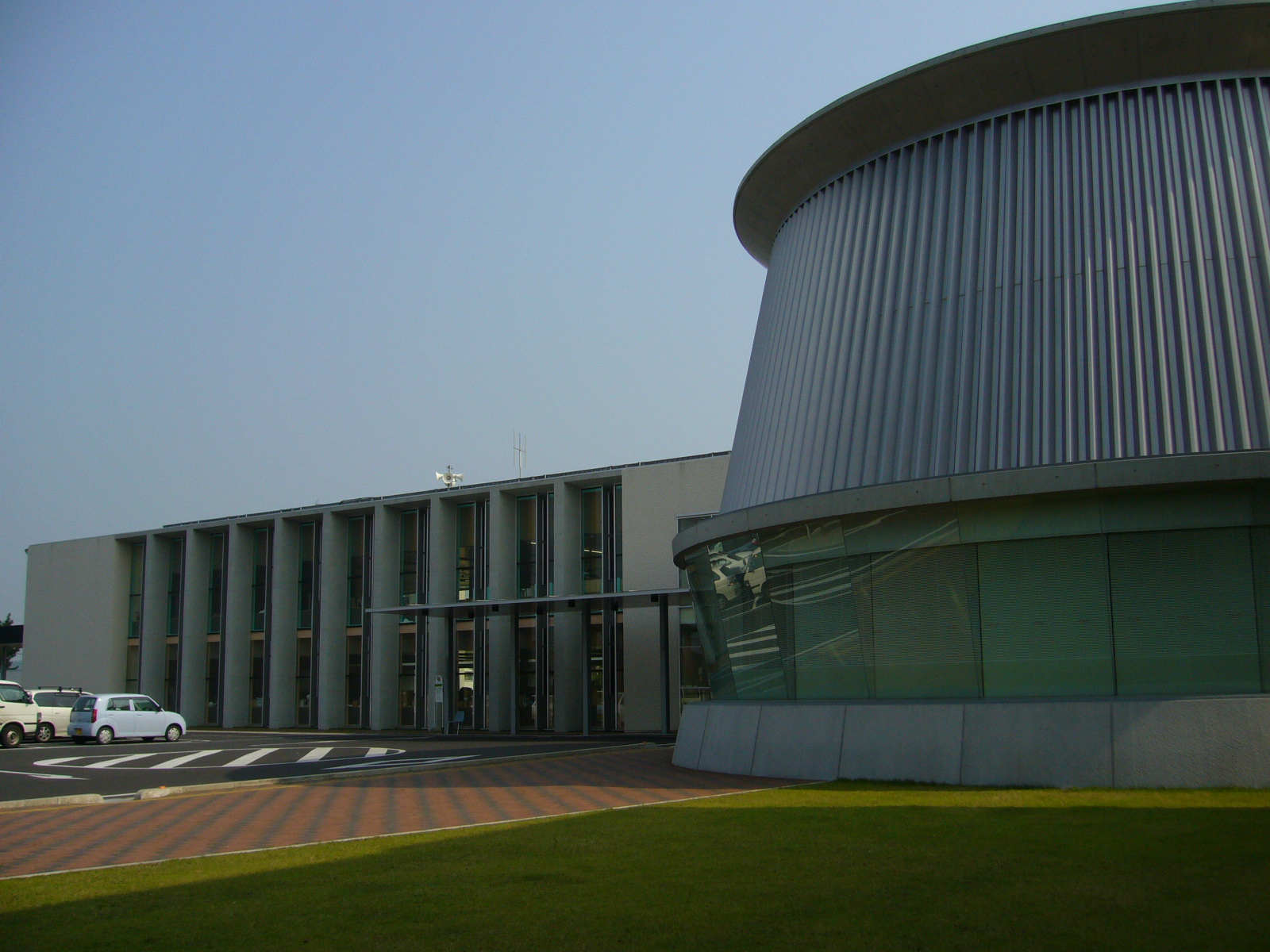
- Tōnoshō Town Hall

- Flag Seal

- Location of Tōnoshō in Chiba Prefecture

- Location in Japan
- Coordinates: 35°50′N 140°40′E
- Country: Japan
- Region: Kantō
- Prefecture: Chiba
- District: Katori

Area
  - Total: 46.16 km^{2} (17.82 sq mi)

Population (December 2020)
  - Total: 13,637
  - Density: 295.4/km^{2} (765.2/sq mi)
- Time zone: UTC+9 (Japan Standard Time)
- Town symbols
  - Insect: Sasakia charonda
  - Bird: Ochre-rumped bunting
- Phone number: 0478-86-1111
- Address: 4713-131 Sasakawa Katori-gun, Tōnoshō -machi, Chiba-ken 285-8510
- Website: Official website

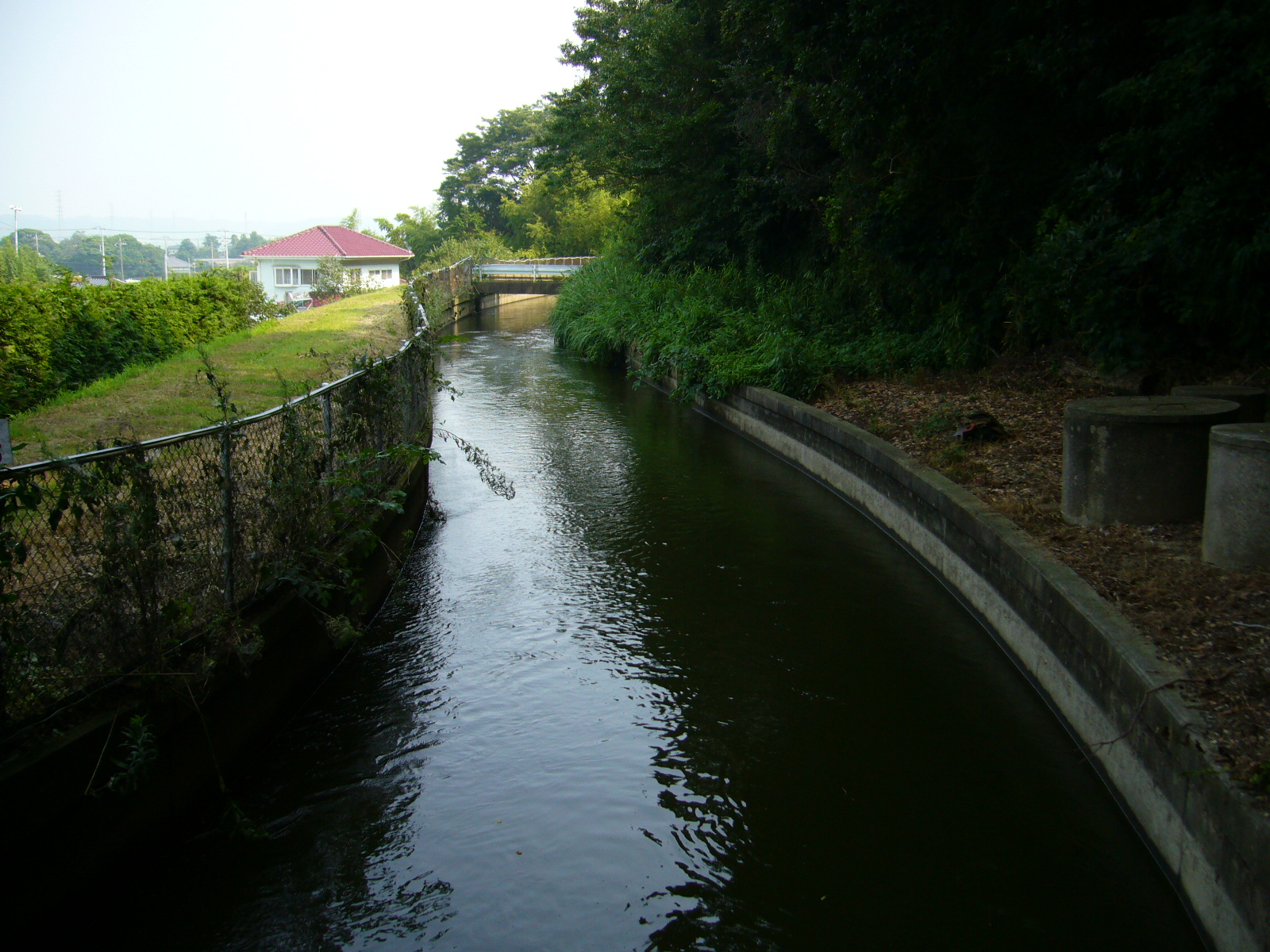
Ōtone irrigation canal

Tōnoshō (東庄町, Tōnoshō-machi) is a town located in Chiba Prefecture, Japan. As of 1 December 2020, the town had an estimated population of 13,637 in 5234 households and a population density of 300 persons per km^{2}. The total area of the town is 46.16 square kilometres (17.82 mi^{2}).

== Geography ==
Tōnoshō is located in far northeastern Chiba Prefecture approximately 55 kilometers from then prefectural capital at Chiba and 80 to 90 kilometers from central Tokyo. It is bordered to the north by the Tone River, which also forms the border with Ibaraki Prefecture. The area is part of the Kantō Plain and is mostly flat, and much is from 40 to 50 meters above sea level in average elevation.

=== Neighboring municipalities ===
Chiba Prefecture

- Asahi
- Chōshi
- Kamisu
- Katori

=== Climate ===
Tōnoshō has a humid subtropical climate (Köppen Cfa) characterized by warm summers and cool winters with light to no snowfall. The average annual temperature in Tōnoshō is 14.5 °C. The average annual rainfall is 1462 mm with September as the wettest month. The temperatures are highest on average in August, at around 25.8 °C, and lowest in January, at around 4.2 °C.

== Demographics ==
Per Japanese census data, the population of Tōnoshō has been decreasing over the past 40 years.

Historical population
Year	Pop.	±%
1920	13,202	—
1930	14,146	+7.2%
1940	15,066	+6.5%
1950	18,631	+23.7%
1960	16,754	−10.1%
1970	14,857	−11.3%
1980	18,205	+22.5%
1990	17,988	−1.2%
2000	17,063	−5.1%
2010	15,154	−11.2%
2020	13,228	−12.7%

== History ==
The area around Tōnoshō has been inhabited since at least the Japanese Paleolithic, and archaeologists have found stone tools and tombs from the Kofun period. During the Kamakura and Muromachi periods, the area was under control of the Chiba clan. After the start of the Edo period, much of the area of Tōnoshō was part of Omigawa Domain, a minor feudal domain under the Tokugawa shogunate.

After the Meiji Restoration, the villages of Tōjō, Tachibana, Jindai and Sasagawa were founded on April 1, 1889, within Katori District of Chiba Prefecture with the creation of the modern municipalities system. Sasagawa was elevated to town status on August 1, 1907. The area rapidly developed with the coming of the Narita Line railway and the development of the Kashima Industrial Complex in neighboring Ibaraki Prefecture after World War II. The town of Tōnoshō was created on July 20, 1955, through the merger of Sasagawa with Tachibana, Jindai and Tōjō villages.

== Government ==
Tōnoshō has a mayor-council form of government with a directly elected mayor and a unicameral town council of 15 members. Tōnoshō, together with the city of Chōshi, contributes two members to the Chiba Prefectural Assembly. In terms of national politics, the town is part of Chiba 10th district of the lower house of the Diet of Japan.

== Economy ==
Tōnoshō is a regional commercial center whose economy is primarily agricultural, with some light manufacturing industries. The main crops include rice and turnips. Industry includes fish processing and the production of soy sauce.

== Education ==
Tōnoshō has one public elementary school and one public middle school operated by the town government. The town does not have a high school.

== Transportation ==
=== Railway ===
JR East – Narita Line

- Sasagawa - Shimōsa-Tachibana

=== Highway ===
- National Route 356

== Notable people ==
- Motoo Hayashi, politician
