= Saruda Station =

Railway station in Chōshi, Chiba Prefecture, Japan

Saruda Station 猿田駅
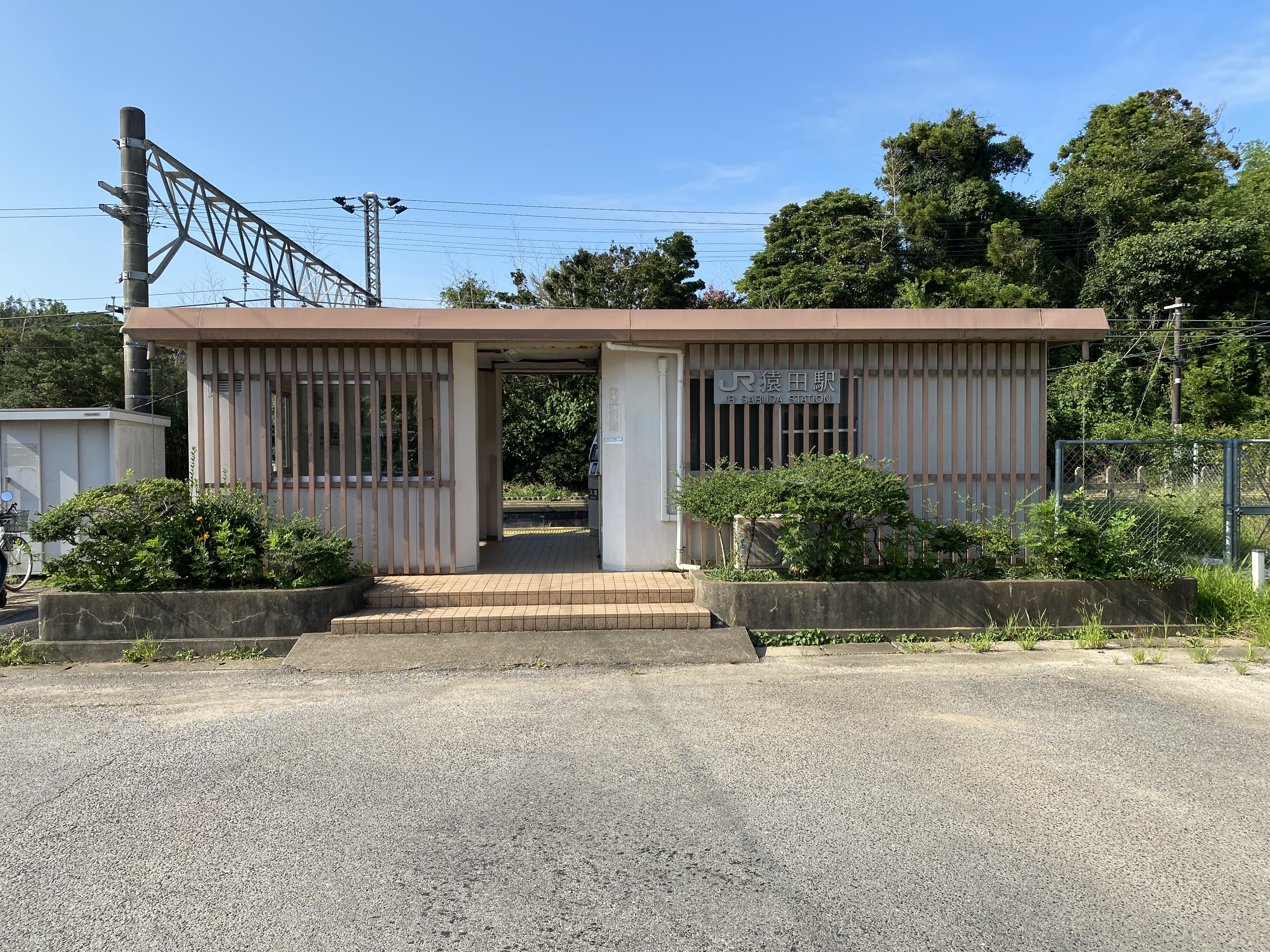
- Saruda Station in August 2021

General information
- Location: Saruda-chō, Chōshi-shi, Chiba-ken 288–0855; Japan
- Coordinates: 35.7471°N 140.7375°E
- Operator: JR East
- Line: ■ Sōbu Main Line
- Distance: 111.8 km from Tokyo
- Platforms: 2 side platforms

Other information
- Status: Unstaffed
- Website: Official website

History
- Opened: 25 January 1898

Passengers
- 2006: 240 daily

Services
Preceding station	JR East	Following station
Kurahashi towards Chiba	Sōbu Main Line Local	Matsugishi towards Chōshi
Location
- Location within Chiba Prefecture Location within Japan

Saruda Station (猿田駅, Saruda-eki) is a passenger railway station in the city of Chōshi, Chiba Japan, operated by the East Japan Railway Company (JR East).

== Lines ==
Saruda Station is served by the Sōbu Main Line between Tokyo and Chōshi, and is located 111.8 kilometers from the western terminus of the line at Tokyo Station.

== Station layout ==
The station consists of dual opposed side platforms connected to the station building by a footbridge. The station is unattended.

=== Platforms ===
1	■ Sōbu Main Line	For Asahi, Yōkaichiba, Narutō, Chiba
2	■ Sōbu Main Line	For Chōshi

== History ==
Saruda Station was opened on 25 January 1898 as a station on the Sōbu Railway for both passenger and freight operations. On 1 September 1907, the Sōbu Railway was nationalised, becoming part of the Japanese Government Railway (JGR). After World War II, the JGR became the Japan National Railways (JNR). Scheduled freight operations were suspended from 1 October 1962. The station was absorbed into the JR East network upon the privatization of the Japan National Railways (JNR) on 1 April 1987. The station building was partially reconstructed in January 2007.

== Passenger statistics ==
In fiscal 2006, the station was used by an average of 240 passengers daily

== Surrounding area ==
- Chiba Prefectural Road No. 71 Choshi Asahi Line
- Chiba Prefectural Road 211 Iioka Saruta Stop Line
- Saruda Shrine

== See also ==
- List of railway stations in Japan
