= Matsuo Station (Chiba) =

Railway station in Sanmu, Chiba Prefecture, Japan

Matsuo Station 松尾駅
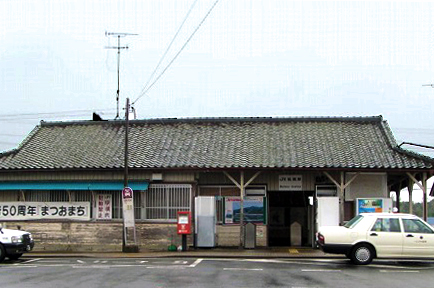
- Matsuo Station in March 2006

General information
- Location: Gotanda, Matsuo-machi, Sanmu-shi, Chiba-ken 289–1523; Japan
- Coordinates: 35°38′9.4″N 140°27′27.5″E
- Operator: JR East
- Line: ■ Sōbu Main Line
- Distance: 82.5 km from Tokyo
- Platforms: 2 side platforms

Other information
- Status: Staffed
- Website: Official website

History
- Opened: 25 February 1898

Passengers
- FY2019: 895

Services
Preceding station	JR East	Following station
Narutō towards Chiba	Sōbu Main Line Local	Yokoshiba towards Chōshi
Location
- Location within Chiba Prefecture Location within Japan

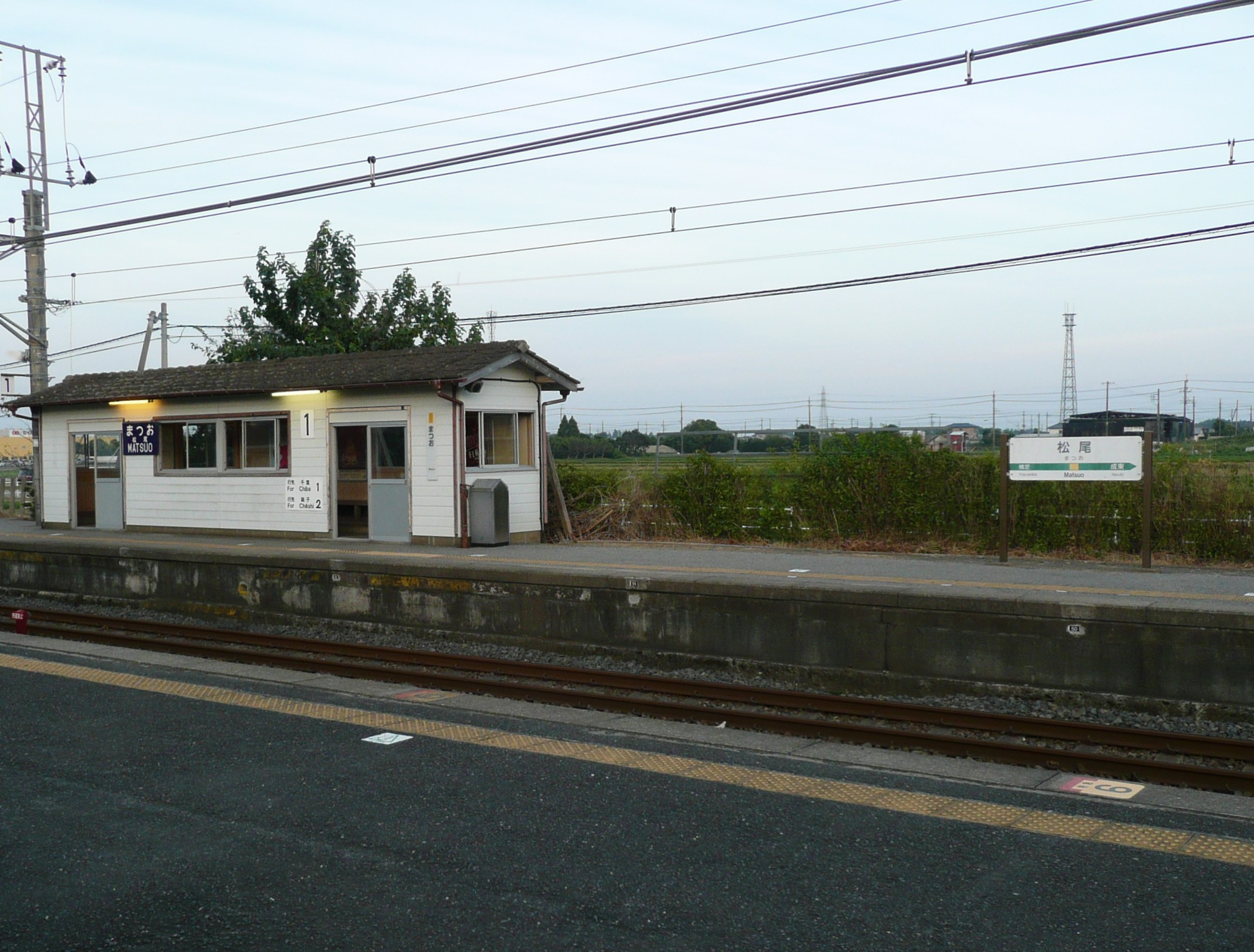
View of the platforms, September 2010

Matsuo Station (松尾駅, Matsuo-eki) is a passenger railway station in the city of Sanmu, Chiba, Japan, operated by the East Japan Railway Company (JR East).

== Lines ==
Matsuo Station is served by the Sōbu Main Line, and is located 82.5 km from the western terminus of the line at Tokyo Station.

== Layout ==
The station consists of two opposed side platforms connected by a footbridge. The station is staffed.

=== Platforms ===
1	■ Sobu Main Line	for Sakura, Narutō, and Chiba
2	■ Sobu Main Line	for Asahi, Yōkaichiba, and Chōshi

== History ==
Matsuo Station opened on 25 February 1898 as a station on the Sōbu Railway for both passenger and freight operations. On 1 September 1907, the Sōbu Railway was nationalised, becoming part of the Japanese Government Railway (JGR). After World War II, the JGR became the Japanese National Railways (JNR). The station was absorbed into the JR East network upon the privatization of JNR on 1 April 1987.

== Passenger statistics ==
In fiscal 2019, the station was used by an average of 895 passengers daily (boarding passengers only).

== Surrounding area ==
The station is located in the urban center of the former town of Matsuo.

== See also ==
- List of railway stations in Japan
