= Enokido Station (Chiba) =

Railway station in Yachimata, Chiba Prefecture, Japan

Enokido Station 榎戸駅
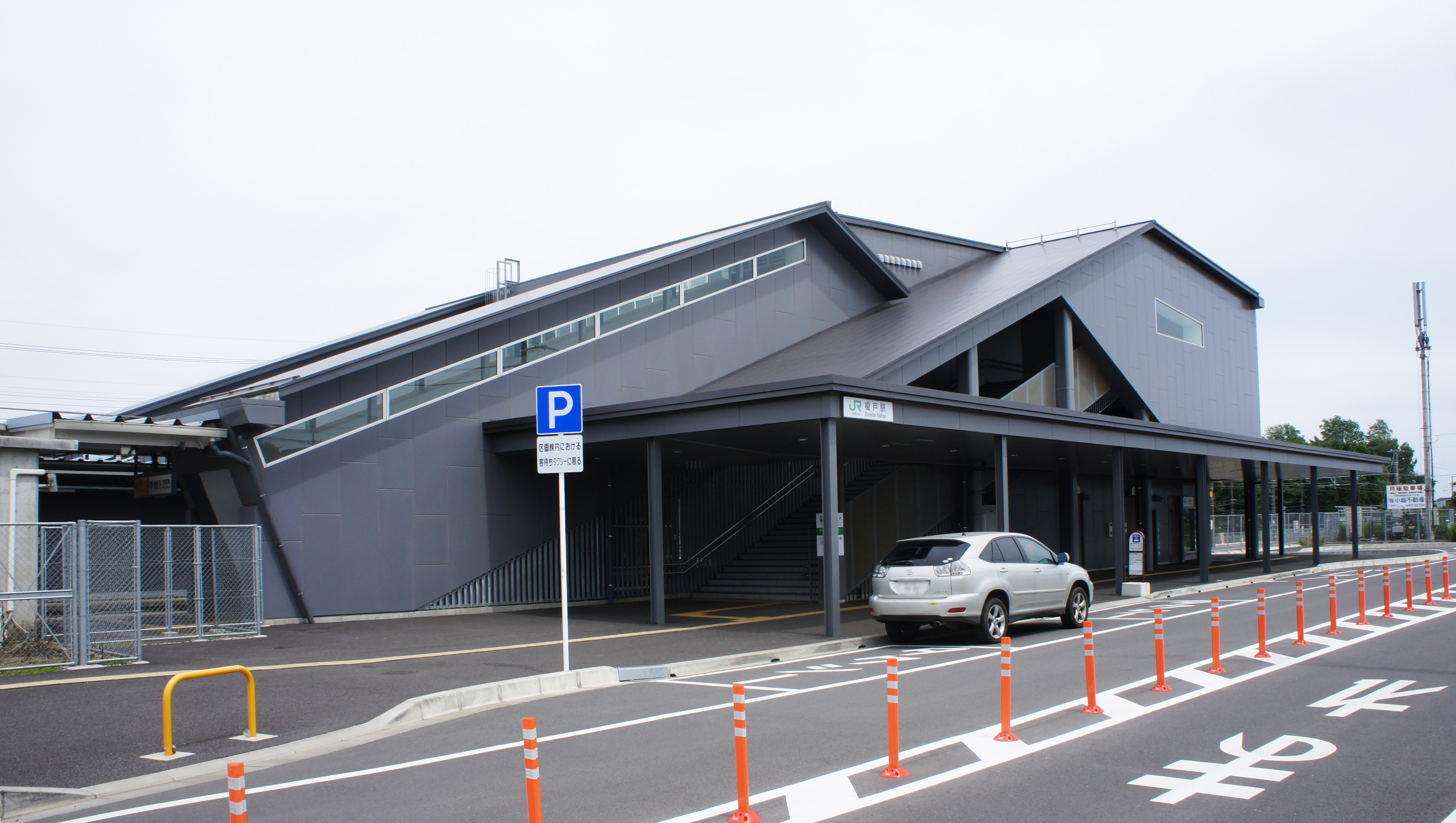
- Enokido Station

General information
- Location: Enokido 924-2, Yachimata-shi, Chiba-ken 289-1106; Japan
- Coordinates: 35°41′2.8″N 140°17′17″E
- Operator: JR East
- Line: ■ Sōbu Main Line
- Distance: 62.2 km from Tokyo
- Platforms: 2 side platforms

Other information
- Status: Staffed
- Website: Official website

History
- Opened: April 1, 1957

Passengers
- FY2019: 1998

Services
Preceding station	JR East	Following station
Minami-Shisui towards Chiba	Sōbu Main Line Local	Yachimata towards Chōshi
Location
- Location within Chiba Prefecture Location within Japan

Enokido Station (榎戸駅, Enokido-eki) is a passenger railway station in the city of Yachimata, Chiba Japan, operated by the East Japan Railway Company (JR East).

== Lines ==
Enokido Station is served by the Sōbu Main Line between Tokyo and Chōshi, and is located 62.2 kilometers from the western terminus of the Sōbu Main Line at Tokyo Station.

== Layout ==
The station consists of two opposed side platforms connected by a footbridge. The station is staffed.

=== Platforms ===
1	■ Sōbu Main Line	For Sakura, For Chiba, Tokyo
2	■ Sōbu Main Line	Narutō, Yōkaichiba, Chōshi

== History ==
Enokido Station was opened on April 1, 1957 as a passenger station on the Japan National Railways (JNR). The station was absorbed into the JR East network upon the privatization of the Japan National Railways on April 1, 1987. The station building was renovated in 2008.

== Passenger statistics ==
In fiscal 2019, the station was used by an average of 1998 passengers daily (boarding passengers only).

== Surrounding area ==
- Yachimata High School
- Yachimata Kita Elementary School

== See also ==
- List of railway stations in Japan
