= Minami-Shisui Station =

Railway station in Shisui, Chiba Prefecture, Japan

Minami-Shisui Station 南酒々井駅
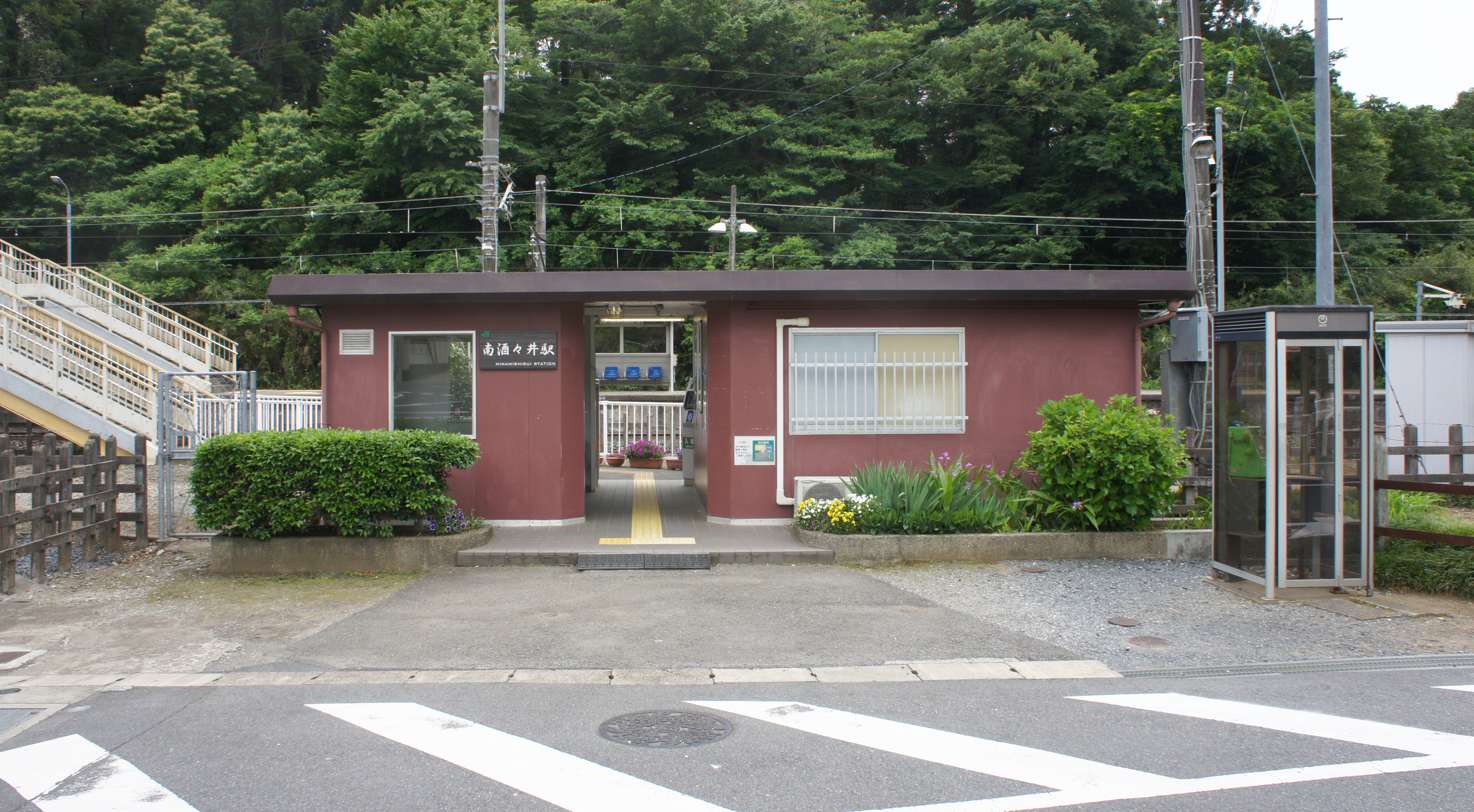
- Minami-Shisui Station in May 2021

General information
- Location: Mabashi 569, Shisui-machi, Inba-gun, Chiba-ken 285-0914; Japan
- Coordinates: 35.7040°N 140.2681°E
- Operator: JR East
- Line: ■ Sōbu Main Line
- Distance: 59.3 km from Tokyo
- Platforms: 1 island platform

Other information
- Status: Unstaffed
- Website: Official website

History
- Opened: September 10, 1914

Passengers
- FY 2006: 208 daily

Services
Preceding station	JR East	Following station
Sakura JO33 towards Chiba	Sōbu Main Line Local	Enokido towards Chōshi
Location
- Location within Chiba Prefecture Location within Japan

Minami-Shisui Station (南酒々井駅, Minami-Shisui-eki) is a passenger railway station in the town of Shisui, Chiba Prefecture, Japan, operated by the East Japan Railway Company (JR East).

== Lines ==
Minami-Shisui Station is served by the Sōbu Main Line, and is located 59.3 km from the western terminus of the line at Tokyo Station.

== Station layout ==
The station consists of a single island platform connected to the station building by a footbridge. The platforms are short and can only accommodate trains of eight carriages in length. The station is unattended.

=== Platforms ===
1	■ Sōbu Main Line	For Sakura, For Chiba, Tokyo
2	■ Sōbu Main Line	Narutō, Yōkaichiba, Chōshi

== History ==
Minami-Shisui Station was opened on September 10, 1914 as a station on the Japanese Government Railway (JGR) for both passenger and freight operations. After World War II, the JGR became the Japan National Railways (JNR). Scheduled freight operations were suspended from October 1, 1962. A new station building was completed in 1980. The station was absorbed into the JR East network upon the privatization of the Japan National Railways (JNR) on April 1, 1987. The station waiting room was renovated in 2008.

== Passenger statistics ==
In fiscal 2006, the station was used by an average of 208 passengers daily

== Surrounding area ==
- Iinuma Honke Corporation
- Shisui Premium Outlet Mall

== See also ==
- List of railway stations in Japan
