= Yachimata Station =

Railway station in Yachimata, Chiba Prefecture, Japan

Yachimata Station 八街駅
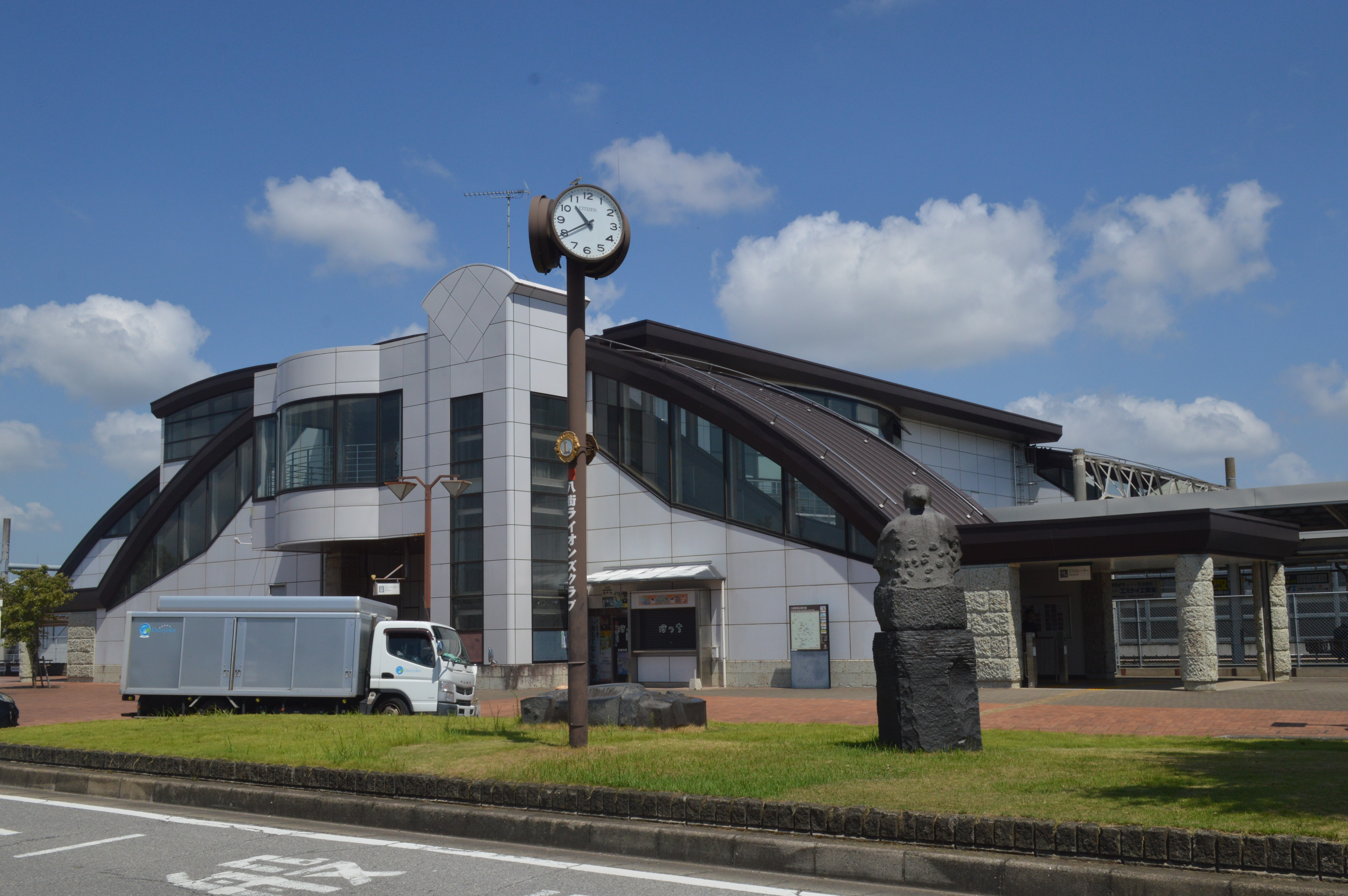
- Station building

General information
- Location: Yachimata Ho 237, Yachimata-shi, Chiba-ken 289-1115; Japan
- Coordinates: 35.6623°N 140.3185°E
- Operator: JR East
- Line: ■ Sōbu Main Line
- Distance: 65.9 km from Tokyo
- Platforms: 1 side + 1 island platform

Other information
- Status: Staffed ("Midori no Madoguchi" )
- Website: Official website

History
- Opened: May 1, 1897

Passengers
- FY2019: 5563

Services
Preceding station	JR East	Following station
Sakura JO33 towards Tokyo	Shiosai	Narutō towards Chōshi
Sakura JO33 towards Chiba	Sōbu Main Line Rapid	Narutō One-way operation
Enokido towards Chiba	Sōbu Main Line Local	Hyūga towards Chōshi
Location
- Location within Chiba Prefecture Location within Japan

Yachimata Station (八街駅, Yachimata-eki) is a passenger railway station in the city of Yachimata, Chiba Japan, operated by the East Japan Railway Company (JR East).

== Lines ==
Yachimata Station is served by the Sōbu Main Line between Tokyo and Chōshi, and is located 65.9 kilometers from the western terminus of the Sōbu Main Line at Tokyo Station.

== Layout ==
The station consists of a single side platform and an island platform connected by a footbridge. The station as a Midori no Madoguchi staffed ticket office.

=== Platforms ===
1	■ Sōbu Main Line	For Sakura, For Chiba, Tokyo
2,3	■ Sōbu Main Line	Narutō, Yōkaichiba, Chōshi

== History ==
Yachimata Station was opened on May 1, 1897 as a station on the Sōbu Railway for both passenger and freight operations. On September 1, 1907, the Sōbu Railway was nationalised, becoming part of the Japanese Government Railway (JGR). The Chiba Prefectural Railways Yachimata Line began operations on May 18, 1914, and was discontinued on May 14, 1940. A new station building was completed in 1926. After World War II, the JGR became the Japan National Railways (JNR). Scheduled freight operations were suspended from November 15, 1982. A new station building was completed in July 1984. The station was absorbed into the JR East network upon the privatization of the Japan National Railways (JNR) on April 1, 1987. Express services began operations from March 16, 1991. A new station building was completed in April 2004.

== Passenger statistics ==
In fiscal 2019, the station was used by an average of 5563 passengers daily (boarding passengers only).

== Surrounding area ==
- Yachimata City Office
- Yachimata Middle School

== See also ==
- List of railway stations in Japan
