= Yokoshiba Station =

Railway station in Yokoshibahikari, Chiba Prefecture, Japan

Yokoshiba Station 横芝駅
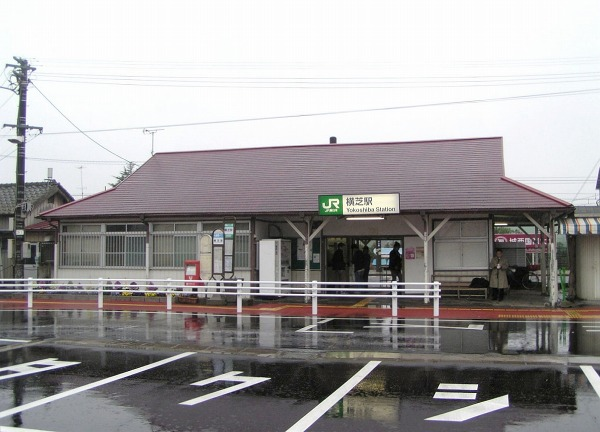
- Yokoshiba Station

General information
- Location: Yokoshiba, Yokoshibahikari-machi, Sambu-gun, Chiba-ken 289-1732; Japan
- Coordinates: 35.6615°N 140.4908°E
- Operator: JR East
- Line: ■ Sōbu Main Line
- Distance: 86.8 km from Tokyo
- Platforms: 1 side + 1 island platform

Other information
- Status: Staffed
- Website: Official website

History
- Opened: 1 June 1897

Passengers
- FY2019: 1358

Services
Preceding station	JR East	Following station
Narutō towards Tokyo	Shiosai	Yōkaichiba towards Chōshi
Matsuo towards Chiba	Sōbu Main Line Local	Iigura towards Chōshi
Location
- Location within Chiba Prefecture Location within Japan

Yokoshiba Station (横芝駅, Yokoshiba-eki) is a passenger railway station in the town of Yokoshibahikari, Chiba Japan, operated by the East Japan Railway Company (JR East).

== Lines ==
Yokoshiba Station is served by the Sōbu Main Line between Tokyo and Chōshi, and is located 86.8 kilometers from the western terminus of the line at Tokyo Station. Shiosai limited express services stop at this station.

== Station layout ==
The station has one side platform and one island platform connected by a footbridge. The station is staffed.

=== Platforms ===
1	■ Sōbu Main Line	for Sakura, Narutō, and Chiba
2	■ Sōbu Main Line	for Yōkaichiba, Asahi, and Chōshi
3	■ Sōbu Main Line	for Sakura, Narutō, and Chiba for Asahi, Yōkaichiba, and Chōshi

== History ==
Yokoshiba Station opened on 1 June 1897 as a station on the Sōbu Railway for both passenger and freight operations. On 1 September 1907, the Sōbu Railway was nationalised, becoming part of the Japanese Government Railway (JGR). After World War II, the JGR became the Japanese National Railways (JNR). The station was absorbed into the JR East network upon the privatization of JNR on 1 April 1987.

== Passenger statistics ==
In fiscal 2019, the station was used by an average of 1358 passengers daily (boarding passengers only).

== Surrounding area ==
- National Route 126

== See also ==
- List of railway stations in Japan
