= Higata Station =

Railway station in Asahi, Chiba Prefecture, Japan

Higata Station 干潟駅
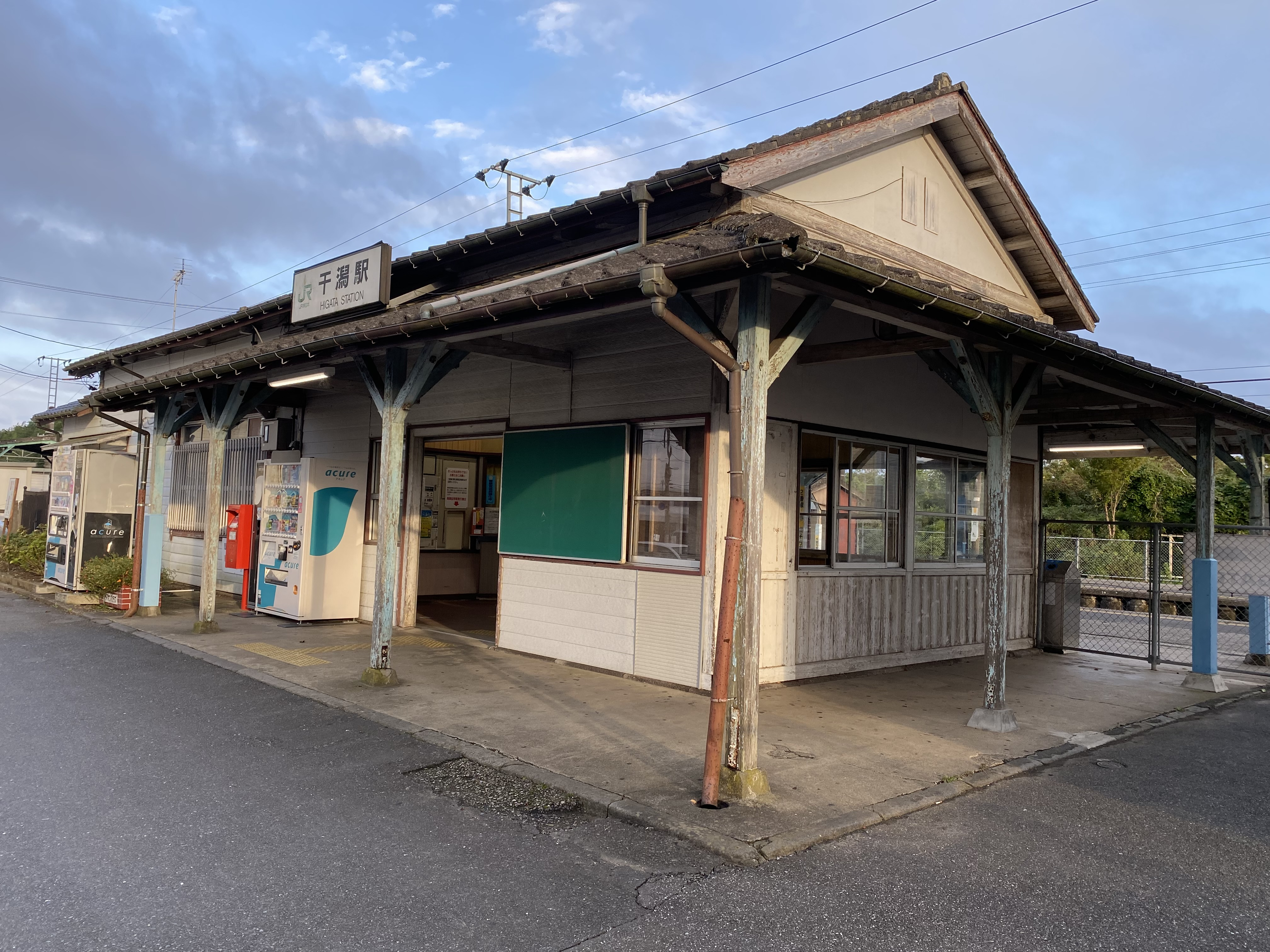
- Higata Station in September 2021

General information
- Location: 6454 Ni, Asahi-shi, Chiba-ken 289–2504; Japan
- Coordinates: 35.7183°N 140.6031°E
- Operator: JR East
- Line: ■ Sōbu Main Line
- Distance: 98.8 km from Tokyo
- Platforms: 2 side platforms

Other information
- Status: Staffed
- Website: Official website

History
- Opened: 25 February 1898

Passengers
- FY2019: 837

Services
Preceding station	JR East	Following station
Yōkaichiba towards Chiba	Sōbu Main Line Local	Asahi towards Chōshi
Location
- Location within Chiba Prefecture Location within Japan

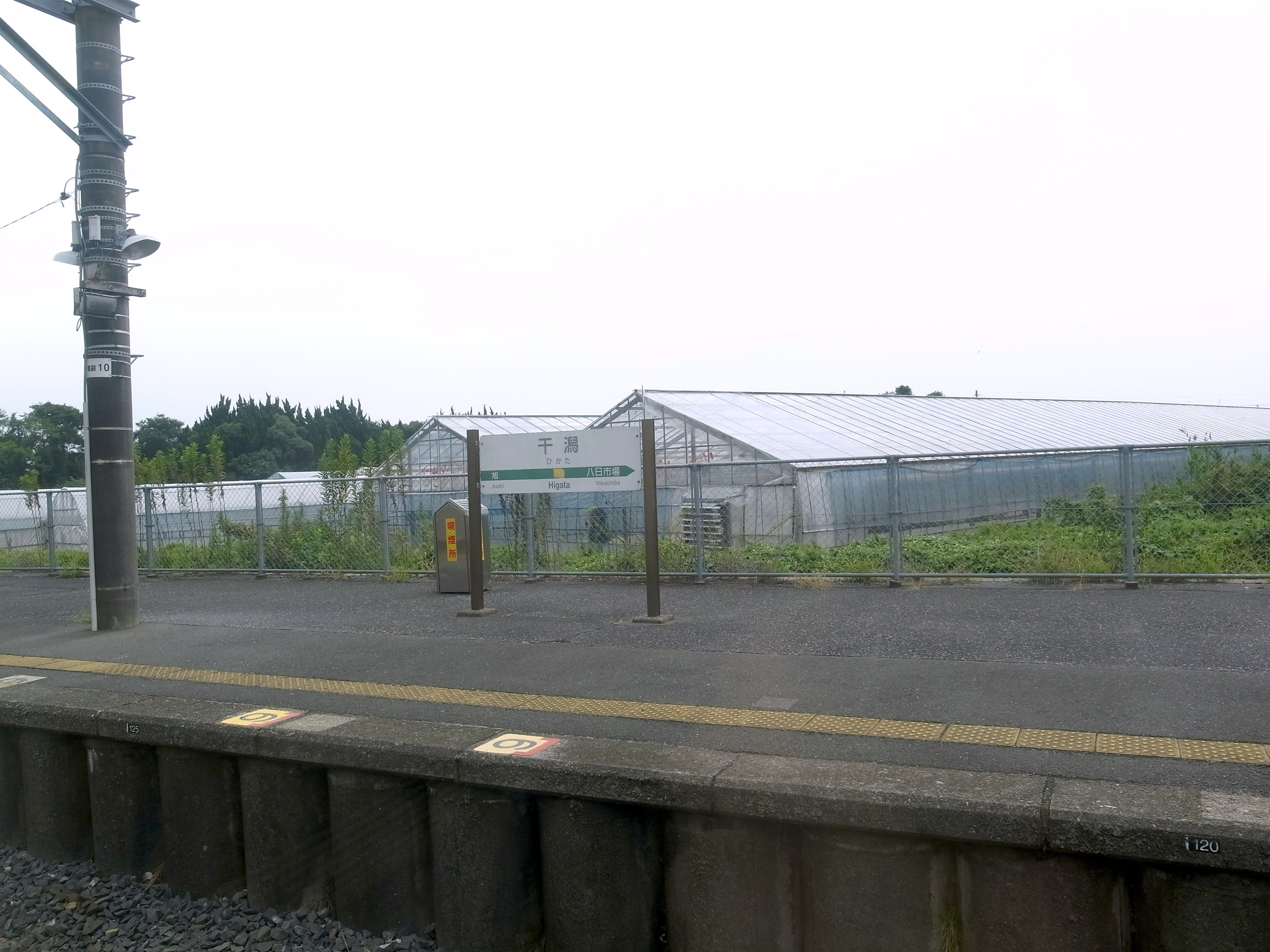
Station platform, 2014.

Higata Station (干潟駅, Higata-eki) is a passenger railway station in the city of Asahi, Chiba Japan, operated by the East Japan Railway Company (JR East).

== Lines ==
Higata Station is served by the Sōbu Main Line between Tokyo and Chōshi, and is located 98.8 kilometers from the western terminus of the Sōbu Main Line at Tokyo Station.

== Station layout ==
The station consists of a two opposed side platforms, connected by a footbridge. The platforms are short, and can accommodate trains of up to eight carriages. The station is staffed.

=== Platforms ===
1	■ Sōbu Main Line	For Asahi, Yōkaichiba, Narutō, Chiba
2	■ Sōbu Main Line	For Chōshi

== History ==
Higata Station was opened on 25 February 1898 as a station on the Sōbu Railway for both passenger and freight operations. On 1 September 1907, the Sōbu Railway was nationalised, becoming part of the Japanese Government Railway (JGR). After World War II, the JGR became the Japan National Railways (JNR). Scheduled freight operations were suspended from 1 October 1971. The station was absorbed into the JR East network upon the privatization of the Japan National Railways (JNR) on 1 April 1987.

== Passenger statistics ==
In fiscal 2019, the station was used by an average of 837 passengers daily (boarding passengers only).

== Surrounding area ==
- National Route 126
- Chiba Prefectural Asahi College of Technology
- Chiba Prefectural Toso Technical High School

== See also ==
- List of railway stations in Japan
