= Iioka Station =

Railway station in Asahi, Chiba Prefecture, Japan

Iioka Station 飯岡駅
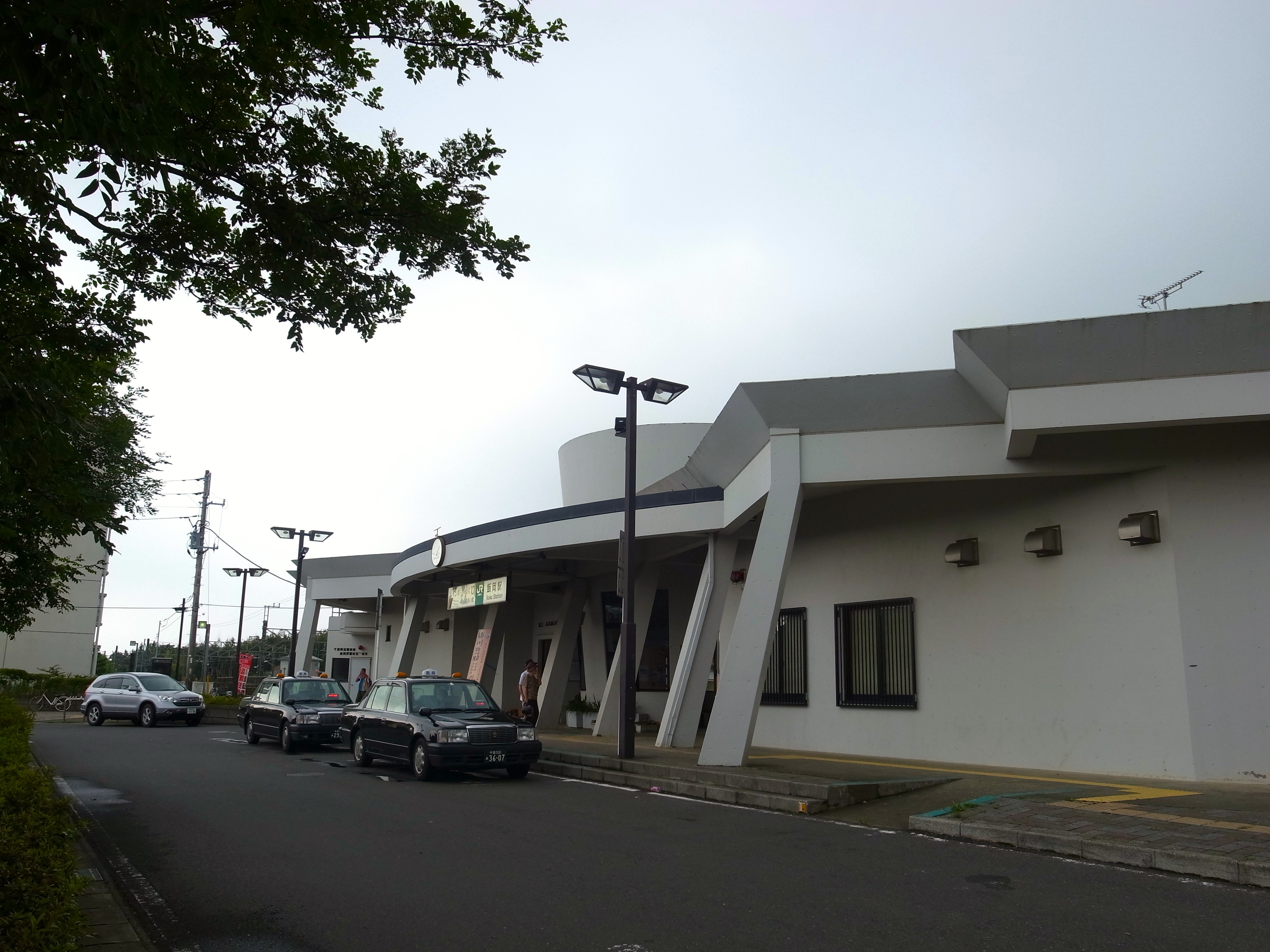
- The station front, August 2014

General information
- Location: 2058-1 Ushirogusa, Asahi-shi, Chiba-ken 289-2613; Japan
- Coordinates: 35.7295°N 140.6837°E
- Operator: JR East
- Line: ■ Sōbu Main Line
- Distance: 109.2 km from Tokyo
- Platforms: 2 side platforms

Other information
- Status: Staffed
- Website: Official website

History
- Opened: 1 June 1897

Passengers
- FY2019: 733

Services
Preceding station	JR East	Following station
Asahi towards Tokyo	Shiosai	Chōshi Terminus
Asahi towards Chiba	Sōbu Main Line Local	Kurahashi towards Chōshi
Location
- Location within Chiba Prefecture Location within Japan

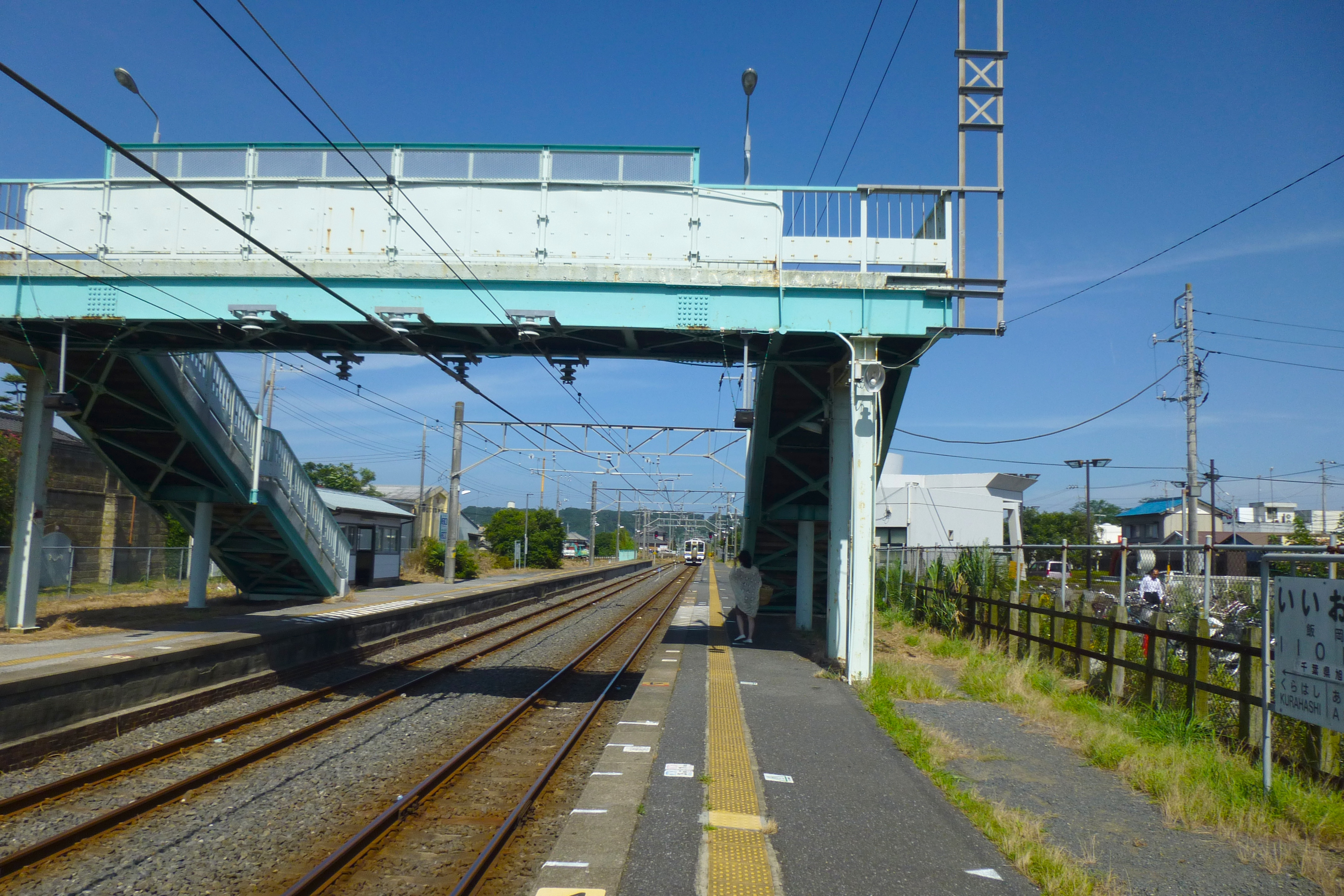
The station platforms, August 2012

Iioka Station (飯岡駅, Iioka-eki) is a passenger railway station in the city of Asahi, Chiba Japan, operated by the East Japan Railway Company (JR East).

== Lines ==
Iioka Station is served by the Sōbu Main Line between Tokyo and Chōshi, and is located 109.2 kilometers from the western terminus of the Sōbu Main Line at Tokyo Station, with Shiosai limited express services between Tokyo and Chōshi also stopping at this station.

== Station layout ==
Iioka Station consists of two opposed side platforms, connected by a footbridge. The station is staffed.

=== Platforms ===
1	■ Sōbu Main Line	for Asahi, Yōkaichiba, Narutō, and Chiba
2	■ Sōbu Main Line	for Chōshi

== History ==
Iioka Station opened on 1 June 1897. The station was absorbed into the JR East network upon the privatization of the Japanese National Railways (JNR) on 1 April 1987.

== Passenger statistics ==
In fiscal 2019, the station was used by an average of 733 passengers daily (boarding passengers only).

== Surrounding area ==
- National Route 126
- Asahi City Marine Junior High School

== See also ==
- List of railway stations in Japan
