= Iigura Station =

Railway station in Sōsa, Chiba Prefecture, Japan

Iigura Station 飯倉駅
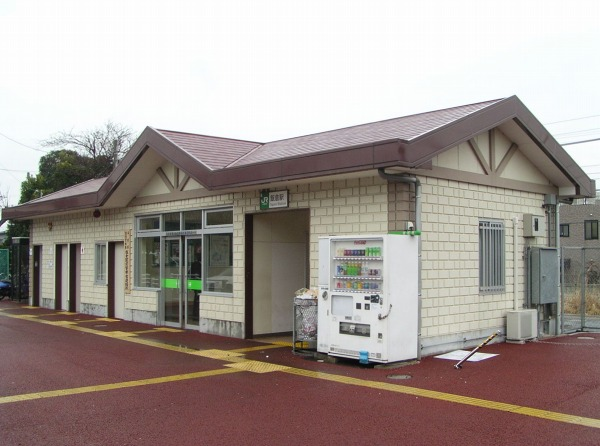
- Iigura Station in March 2006

General information
- Location: Iigura, Sōsa-shi, Chiba-ken 289–2147; Japan
- Coordinates: 35.6854°N 140.5225°E
- Operator: JR East
- Line: ■ Sōbu Main Line
- Distance: 90.6 km from Tokyo
- Platforms: 1 side platform

Other information
- Status: Unstaffed
- Website: Official website

History
- Opened: 1 October 1964

Passengers
- FY2006: 449

Services
Preceding station	JR East	Following station
Yokoshiba towards Chiba	Sōbu Main Line Local	Yōkaichiba towards Chōshi
Location
- Location within Chiba Prefecture Location within Japan

Iigura Station (飯倉駅, Iigura-eki) is a passenger railway station in the city of Sōsa, Chiba Japan, operated by the East Japan Railway Company (JR East).

== Lines ==
Iigura Station is served by the Sōbu Main Line between Tokyo and Chōshi, and is located 90.6 rail km from the western terminus of the Sōbu Main Line at Tokyo Station.

== Station layout ==
Igura Station has a single side platform, serving bi-directional traffic. The platform is short, and can only accommodate trains of eight carriages or less in length. The station is unattended.

== History ==
Iigura Station was opened on 1 October 1964 as a passenger station on the Japan National Railways (JNR). The station was absorbed into the JR East network upon the privatization of the Japan National Railways on 1 April 1987. A new station building was completed in December 2000.

== Passenger statistics ==
In fiscal 2006, the station was used by an average of 449 passengers daily

== Surrounding area ==
- National Route 126

== See also ==
- List of railway stations in Japan
