= Kurahashi Station =

Railway station in Asahi, Chiba Prefecture, Japan

Kurahashi Station 倉橋駅
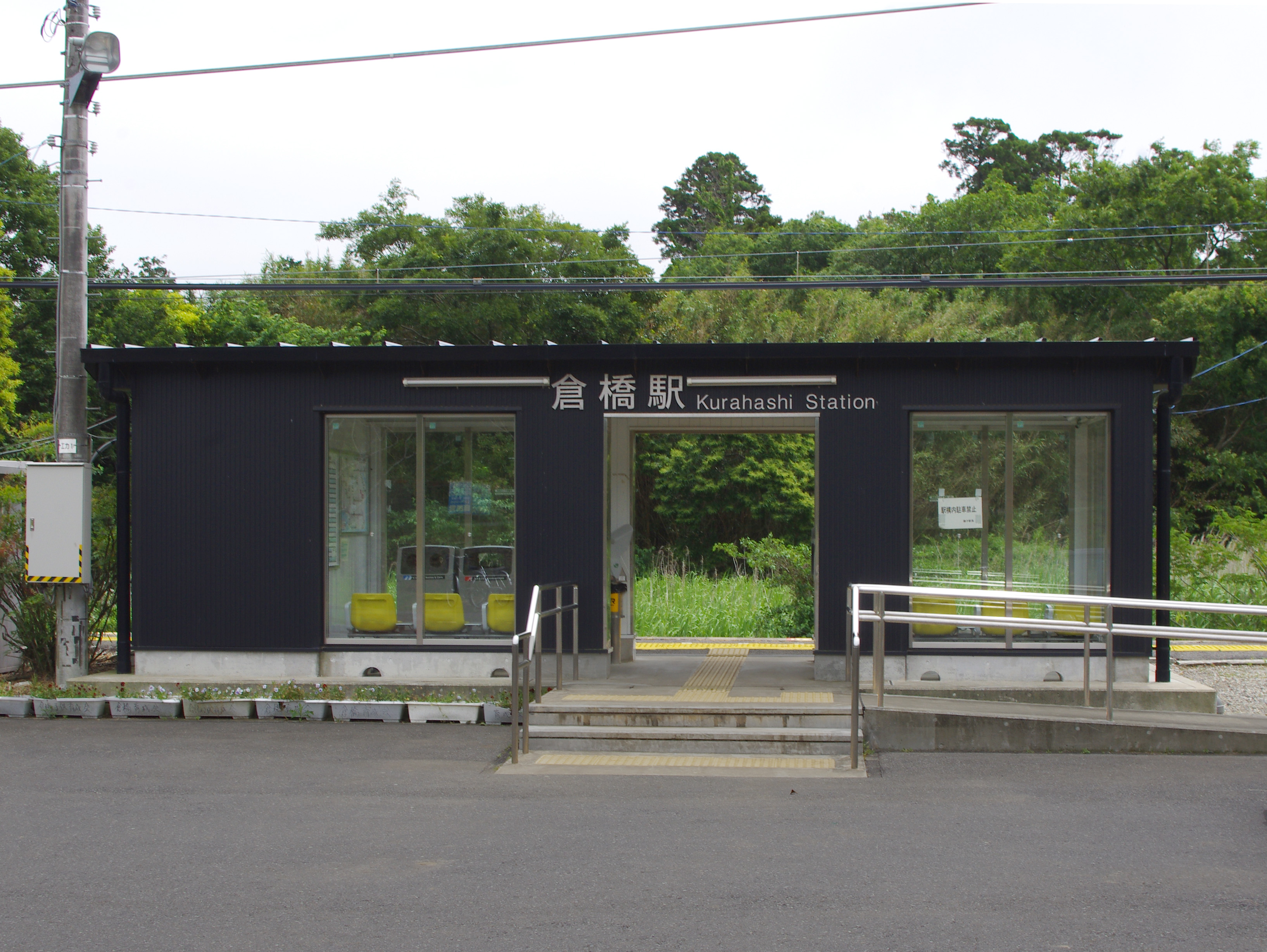
- Kurahashi Station, June 2013

General information
- Location: 1772 Kurahashi, Asahi-shi, Chiba-ken 289–2611; Japan
- Coordinates: 35.7376°N 140.7142°E
- Operator: JR East
- Line: ■ Sōbu Main Line
- Distance: 109.2 km from Tokyo
- Platforms: 1 side platform

Other information
- Status: Unstaffed
- Website: Official website

History
- Opened: 1 June 1960

Passengers
- FY2006: 61

Services
Preceding station	JR East	Following station
Iioka towards Chiba	Sōbu Main Line Local	Saruda towards Chōshi
Location
- Location within Chiba Prefecture Location within Japan

Kurahashi Station (倉橋駅, Kurahashi-eki) is a passenger railway station in the city of Asahi, Chiba Japan, operated by the East Japan Railway Company (JR East).

== Lines ==
Kurahashi Station is served by the Sōbu Main Line between Tokyo and Chōshi, and is located 109.2 kilometers from the western terminus of the Sōbu Main Line at Tokyo Station.

== Station layout ==
The station consists of a single side platform serving bi-directional traffic. The station is unattended.

== History ==
Kurahashi Station was opened on 1 June 1960 for passenger operations only. The station was absorbed into the JR East network upon the privatization of the Japan National Railways (JNR) on 1 April 1987. A new station building was completed in December 2008.

== Passenger statistics ==
In fiscal 2006, the station was used by an average of 61 passengers daily (boarding passengers only).

== Surrounding area ==
- Tsurumaki Elementary School

== See also ==
- List of railway stations in Japan
