= Shiosai =

Japanese limited express train service

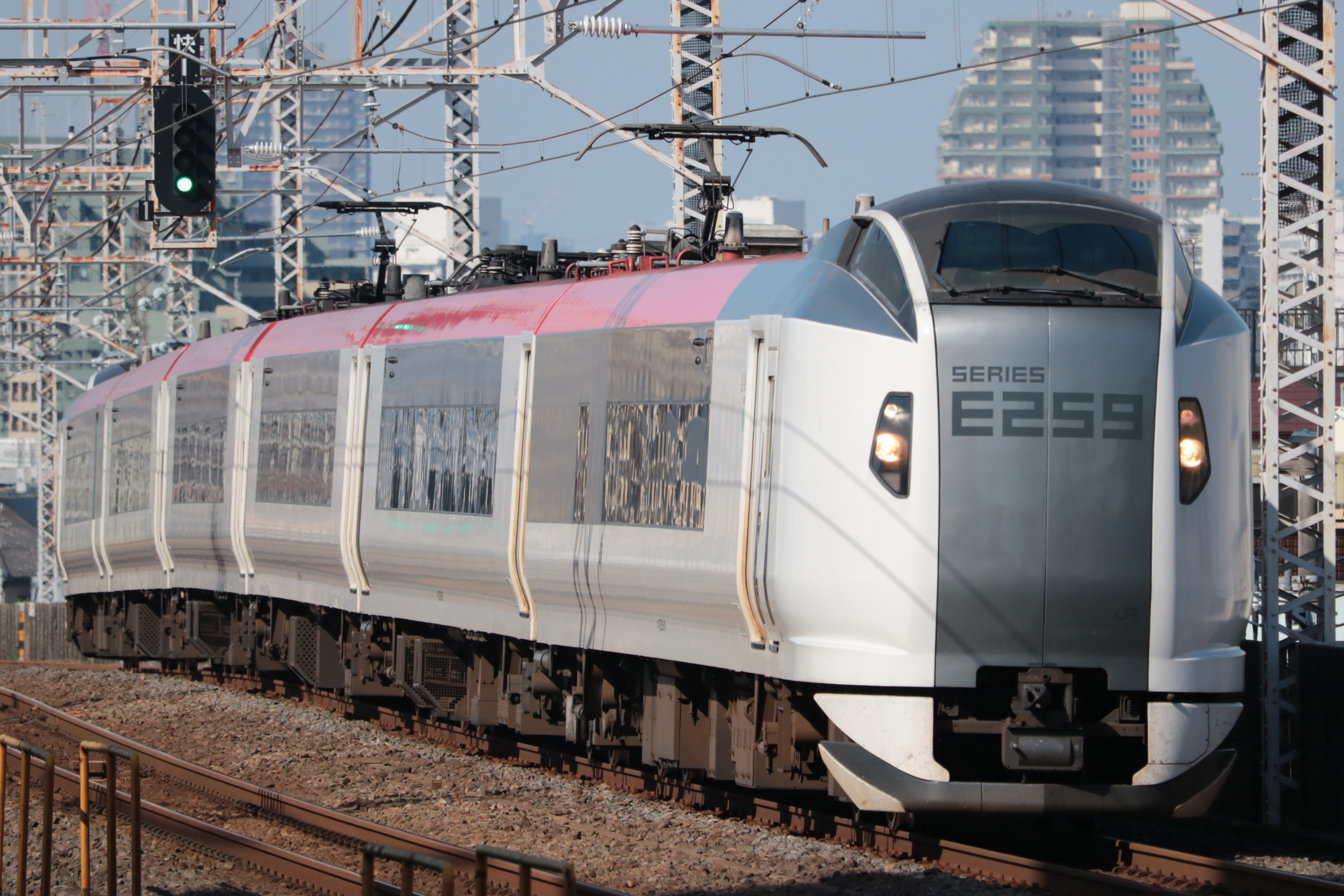
- An E259 series EMU on a Shiosai service in May 2024

Overview
- Service type: Limited express
- Locale: Sōbu Main Line
- First service: 10 March 1975
- Current operator: JR East
- Former operator: JNR

Route
- Termini: Tokyo; Chōshi
- Distance travelled: 120.5 km (74.9 mi)

On-board services
- Catering facilities: Trolley service

Technical
- Rolling stock: E259 series, E257-500 series EMUs
- Track gauge: 1,067 mm (3 ft 6 in)
- Electrification: 1,500 V DC overhead
- Operating speed: 130 km/h (80 mph)

The Shiosai (しおさい) is a limited express train service in Japan operated by East Japan Railway Company (JR East). It runs from Tokyo and Shinjuku to Chōshi on the Bōsō Peninsula in Chiba Prefecture.

== Station stops ==
Shiosai services operate over the Sōbu Main Line, stopping at the stations listed below. All 7 round trips are operated daily except for one inbound trip which is not operated on Saturdays and holidays. No services operate as "Local" all-stations services in any section; this characteristic is different from that of Wakashio limited express trains.

Tokyo - Kinshichō - Chiba - Sakura - Yachimata - Narutō - Yokoshiba - Yōkaichiba - Asahi - Iioka - Chōshi

- No. 2, 4 & 13 trains also stop at Yotsukaidō station.

== Rolling stock ==
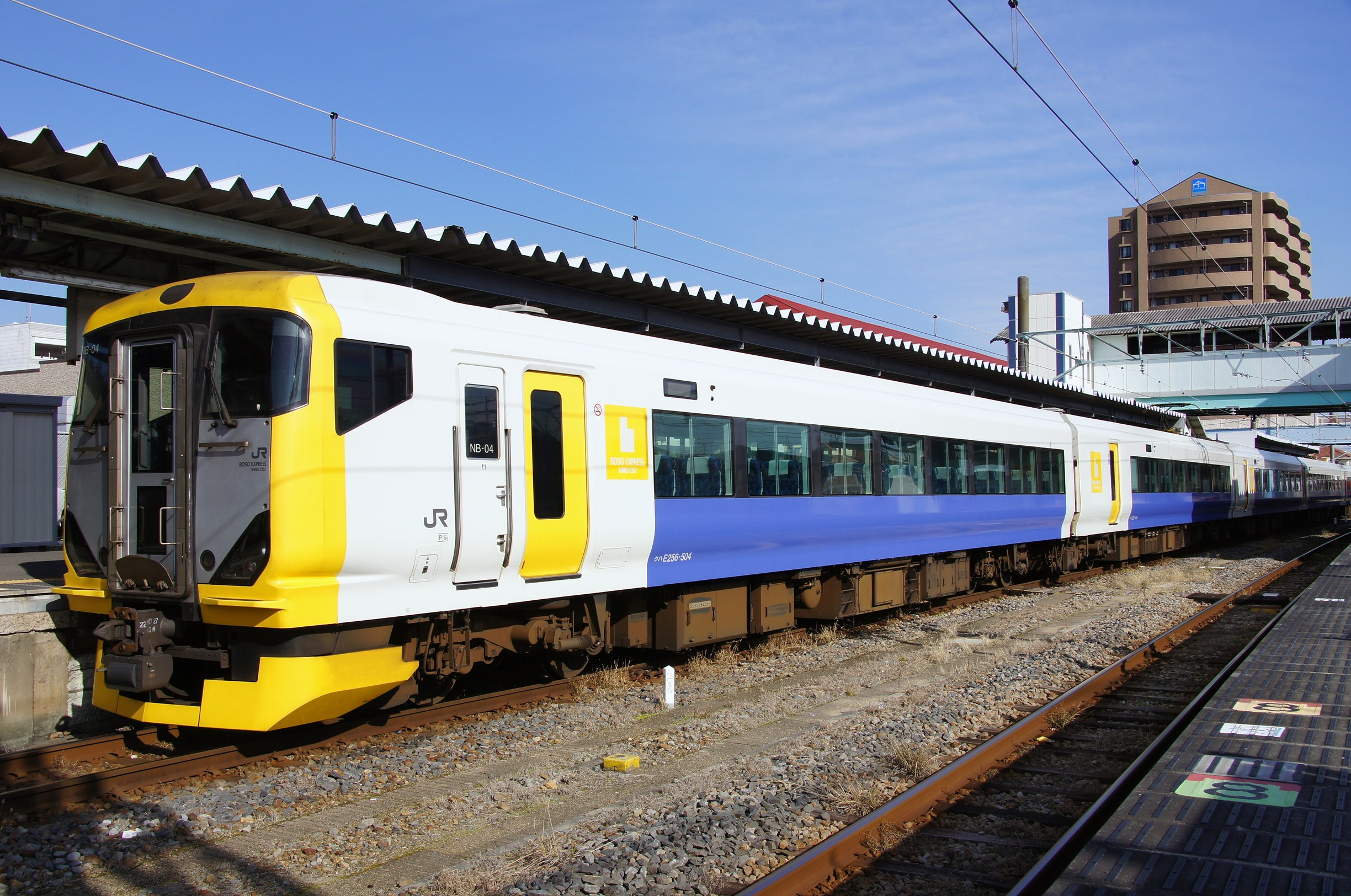
An E257-500 series 5-car set on a Shiosai service in January 2012

- E259 series 6-car EMUs (since 16 March 2024)
- E257-500 series 5-car EMUs

Shiosai services are operated using Kamakura-based 6-car E259 series EMU and Makuhari-based 5-car E257-500 series EMU formations. The E257-500 series formations have no Green (first class) cars.

=== Past rolling stock ===
- 183 series EMUs (10 March 1975 – 2005)
- 255 series 9-car EMUs (10 December 2005 – 15 March 2024)

== Formations ==
Trains are formed as shown below, with car 1 at the Tokyo end.

=== 5+5-car E257 series (No. 4 only) ===
Car No.	1	2	3	4	5	6	7	8	9	10
Numbering	KuHa E256-500	MoHa E257-1500	MoHa E256-500	MoHa E257-500	KuHa E257-500	KuHa E256-500	MoHa E257-1500	MoHa E256-500	MoHa E257-500	KuHa E257-500
Accommodation	Non-reserved	Non-reserved	Non-reserved	Reserved	Reserved	Reserved	Reserved	Reserved	Non-reserved	Non-reserved

== Past formations ==
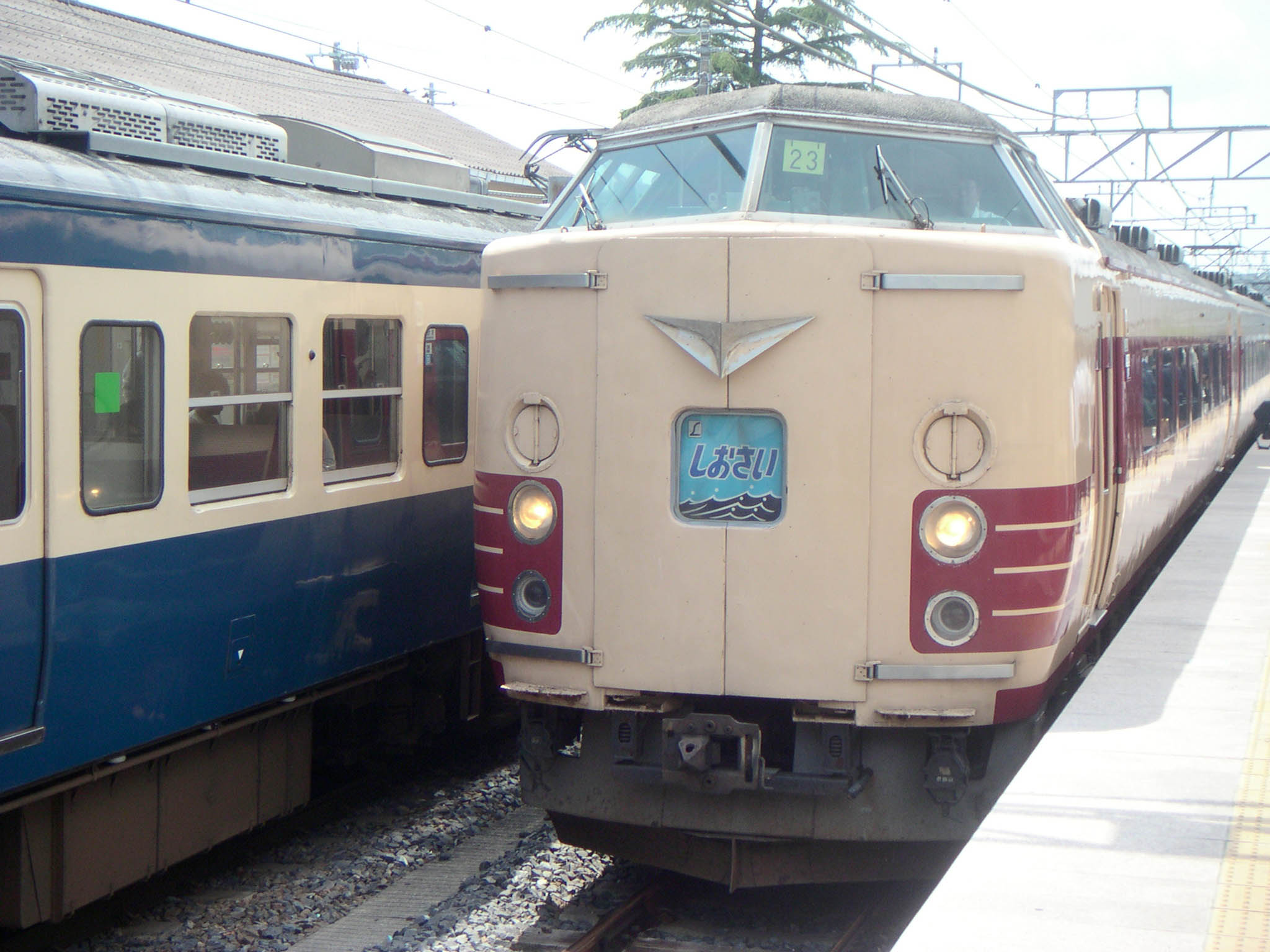
183 series EMU on a Shiosai service, May 2005

Trains were originally formed of 9-car 183 series EMUs, including one Green car, or 6-car sets with no Green car, but from December 1994, services were formed of 8-car 183 series sets with the Green car removed, as shown below.

=== 8-car 183 series ===
Car No.	1	2	3	4	5	6	7	8
Accommodation	Reserved	Reserved	Non-reserved	Non-reserved	Non-reserved	Non-reserved	Non-reserved	Non-reserved

=== 9-car 255 series ===
Car No.	1	2	3	4	5	6	7	8	9
Numbering	KuHa 254	MoHa 254	MoHa 255	SaRo 255	SaHa 254	SaHa 255	MoHa 254	MoHa 255	KuHa 255
Accommodation	Reserved	Reserved	Reserved	Green	Reserved	Non-reserved	Non-reserved	Non-reserved	Non-reserved

== History ==
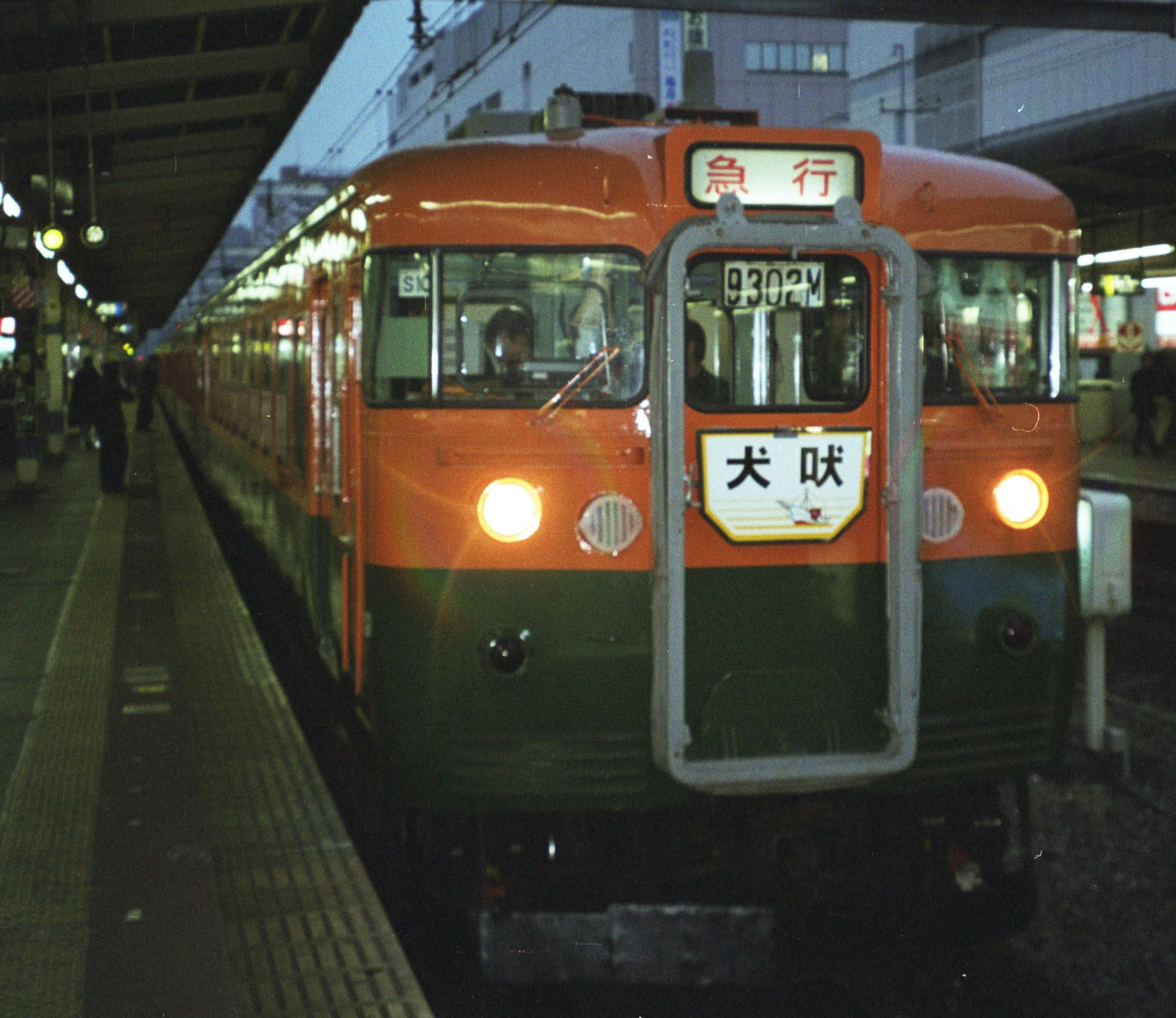
165 series EMU on a special Inubō revival working in November 2002

The Shiosai service was introduced from 10 March 1975 following the completion of electrification of the Sōbu Main Line in October 1974, using 9-car 183 series EMUs, replacing five of the seven daily diesel-powered Inubō (犬吠) express services that operated between Shinjuku/Ryōgoku and Chōshi.

From the start of the November 1982 timetable revision, further 183 series EMUs were drafted in, displaced from Toki limited express services following the opening of the Joetsu Shinkansen, and the remaining Inubō express services were discontinued and absorbed into the Shiosai services, giving seven return workings daily.

From the start of the revised timetable on 10 December 2005, 255 series 9-car EMUs were introduced on Shiosai services. From the same date, services were made entirely no-smoking.

From the start of the 14 March 2015 timetable revision, all Shiosai services started and terminated at Tokyo Station, with no services operating from Shinjuku.

From the start of the 16 March 2024 timetable revision, E259 series 6-car EMUs used on Narita Express services are scheduled to also be used on Shiosai services for six return trips. Meanwhile, E257 series trains in 5-car formations will continue to be used for one return trip. As a result, 255 series sets will no longer operate on these services.

== See also ==
- List of named passenger trains of Japan
