= Sōbu Main Line =

Railway line in Japan

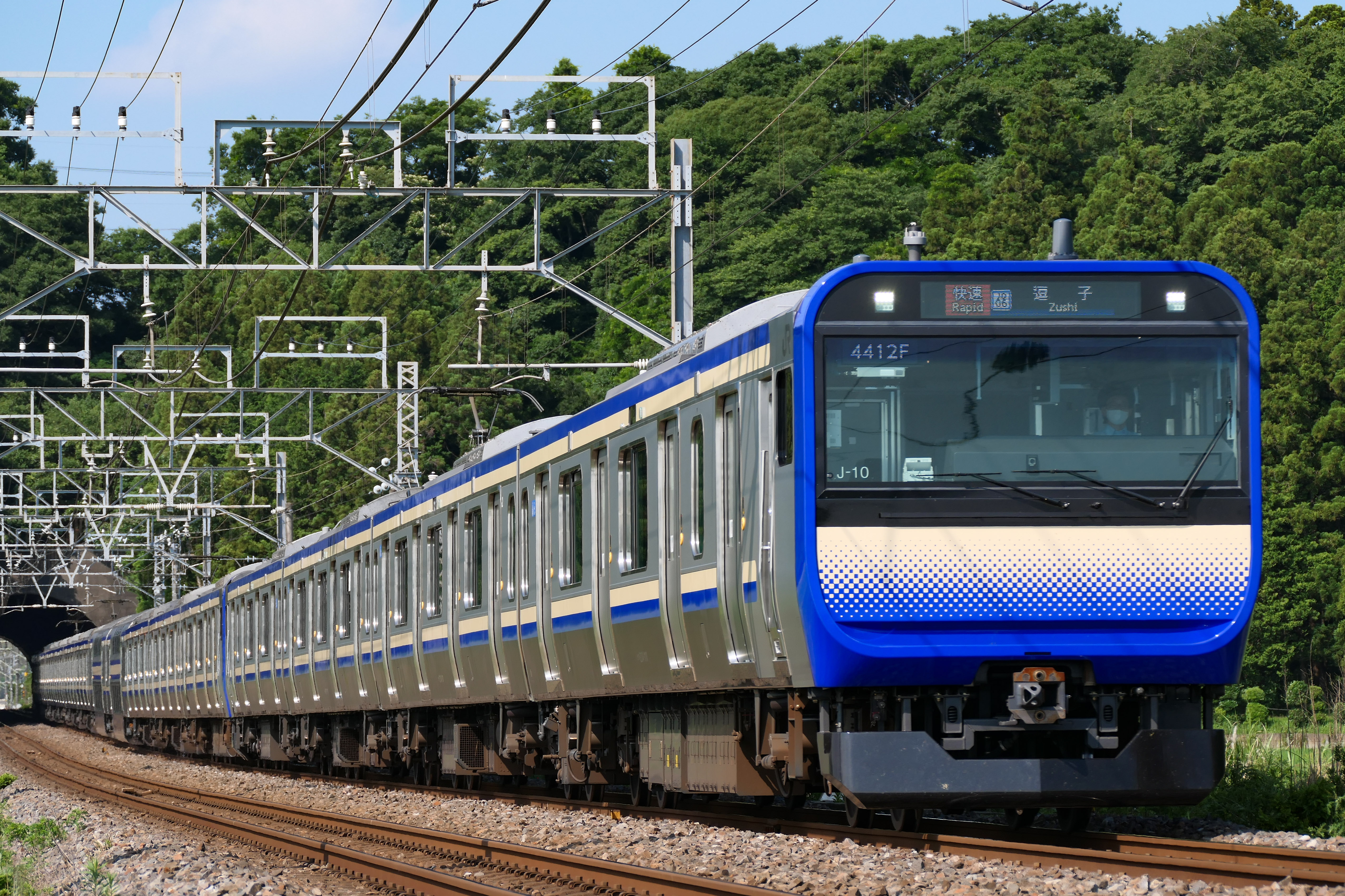
- Sōbu/Yokosuka Line E235 series EMU

Overview
- Owner: JR East
- Locale: Tokyo, Chiba prefectures
- Termini: Chiba; Chōshi
- Stations: 22

Service
- Operator(s): JR East, JR Freight

History
- Opened: 20 July 1894; 132 years ago

Technical
- Track gauge: 1,067 mm (3 ft 6 in)
- Electrification: Overhead line, 1,500 V DC
Route map

The Sōbu Main Line (Japanese: 総武本線, Hepburn: Sōbu-honsen) is a Japanese railway line operated by the East Japan Railway Company (JR East) in Japan. It connects Tokyo with the east coast of Chiba Prefecture, passing through the cities of Funabashi, Chiba, and Chōshi. Its name derives from the old provinces of the area which it serves: Musashi (Japanese: 武蔵国), Shimōsa (Japanese: 下総国) and Kazusa (Japanese: 上総国). Its official line color is navy.

== Definition ==
Formally, the Sōbu Main Line refers to the line from Tokyo to Chōshi.

However, informally, the character of the line changes at Chiba. The more urbanized section west of Chiba is informally, but commonly, called the Sōbu Line (Japanese: 総武線, Japanese pronunciation: [Sōbu sen]) without using "Main". The "Main Line", in popular usage, refers to the more rural section east of Chiba.

Route maps, signs at stations, in trains, and the vocal announcements all maintain this distinction: with Main for the eastern rural section; without Main for the western frequent travel zone.

== Description ==
- Distances:
  - Tokyo - Chōshi: 120.5 km
  - Kinshichō - Ochanomizu: 4.3 km
  - Shin-Koiwa - Etchūjima Freight (Etchūjima freight line): 11.7 km
  - Shin-Koiwa - Kanamachi (Shinkane freight line): 8.9 km
- Electrification: DC 1500 V excluding the non electrified Etchūjima freight line
- Tracks
  - Quadruple: Kinshichō - Chiba
  - Double: Tokyo - Kinshichō, Kinshichō - Ochanomizu, Chiba - Sakura
  - Single: Sakura - Chōshi, Shin-Koiwa - Etchūjima Freight Line, Shin-Koiwa - Kanamachi Freight Line

== Operation ==
=== Services west of Chiba (Tokyo–Chiba) ===
Local trains operate between Ochanomizu Station in Tokyo and Chiba Station and are generally referred to as the Chūō–Sōbu Line or Sōbu-Local Line.

Rapid trains operate between Tokyo Station and Chiba using separate tracks from the local services. Some trains continue east of Chiba onto the Sōbu Main Line, while others continue west of Tokyo onto the Yokosuka Line. These services are generally referred to as the Sōbu Line (Rapid).

The local and rapid services run in parallel between Kinshichō and Chiba. West of Kinshichō, however, their routes diverge. Chūō-Sōbu Line trains continue west from Kinshichō to Ochanomizu via Akihabara on the Chūō Main Line, while Sōbu (Rapid) Line trains continue to Tokyo, with most continuing onto the Yokosuka Line.

For more information on services west of Chiba, see the articles on the Chūō–Sōbu Line and Sōbu Line (Rapid).

=== Services east of Chiba (Chiba–Chōshi) ===
The section between Chiba and Chōshi is commonly known as the Sōbu Main Line. Some Sōbu (Rapid) Line services continue east of Chiba, terminating at Sakura or Narutō, while others continue beyond Sakura onto the Narita Line to Narita Airport or Kashimajingū. Local trains also operate along the Sōbu Main Line between Chiba and Chōshi.

==== Limited express services ====
The Shiosai limited express service operates over the length of the Sōbu Main Line between Tokyo and Chōshi.

The Narita Express to Narita Airport uses the Sōbu Main Line between Tokyo and Chiba as part of its journey.

== Stations ==
=== Tokyo / Ochanomizu - Kinshichō - Chiba ===
Here is a list of stations within this section. ([ ] denotes the Ochanomizu - Kinshicho section.) Tokyo - Shin-Nihombashi - Bakurochō [ Ochanomizu - Akihabara - Asakusabashi - Ryōgoku - Kinshichō ] Kameido - Hirai - Shin-Koiwa - Koiwa - Ichikawa - Moto-Yawata - Shimōsa-Nakayama - Nishi-Funabashi - Funabashi - Higashi-Funabashi - Tsudanuma - Makuharihongō - Makuhari - Shin-Kemigawa - Inage - Nishi-Chiba - Chiba

=== Chiba - Chōshi ===
For the connections of the line, see the route diagram.

From Chiba to Sakura, the section is double track; and from Sakura onwards to Choshi, the section is single track.

All stations on this section of the line are in Chiba Prefecture.

Legend:

- ● : All trains stop
- ▲ : Only westbound trains (for Chiba, Tokyo) stop
- ♦ : Some trains stop
- | : All trains pass

No.	Station	Distance in km (mi)			Sōbu (Rapid)	Shiosai	Transfers	Location
No.	Station	Between stations	From Chiba	From Tokyo	Sōbu (Rapid)	Shiosai	Transfers	Location
JO28	Chiba 千葉	—N/a	0 (0)	39.2 (24.4)	●	●	Sōbu Line (Rapid) (through service); Chūō–Sōbu Line (JB39); ■ Uchibō Line; ■ Sotobō Line; ■ Narita Line; Chiba Line (Keisei Chiba: KS59); Chiba Urban Monorail (CM03)	Chūō-ku, Chiba
JO29	Higashi-Chiba 東千葉	0.9 (0.56)		40.1 (24.9)	|	|	■ Narita Line	Chūō-ku, Chiba
JO30	Tsuga 都賀	3.3 (2.1)	4.2 (2.6)	43.4 (27.0)	●	|	■ Narita Line; Chiba Urban Monorail (CM11)	Wakaba-ku, Chiba
JO31	Yotsukaidō 四街道	3.5 (2.2)	7.7 (4.8)	46.9 (29.1)	●	♦	■ Narita Line	Yotsukaidō
JO32	Monoi 物井	4.2 (2.6)	11.9 (7.4)	51.1 (31.8)	●	|	■ Narita Line	Yotsukaidō
JO33	Sakura 佐倉	4.2 (2.6)	16.1 (10.0)	55.3 (34.4)	●	●	■ Narita Line	Sakura
	Minami-Shisui 南酒々井	4.0 (2.5)	20.1 (12.5)	59.3 (36.8)	|	|		Shisui
	Enokido 榎戸	2.9 (1.8)	23.0 (14.3)	62.2 (38.6)	|	|		Yachimata
	Yachimata 八街	3.7 (2.3)	26.7 (16.6)	65.9 (40.9)	▲	●		Yachimata
	Hyūga 日向	5.8 (3.6)	32.5 (20.2)	71.7 (44.6)	|	|		Sanmu
	Narutō 成東	5.2 (3.2)	37.7 (23.4)	76.9 (47.8)	▲	●	■ Tōgane Line	Sanmu
	Matsuo 松尾	5.6 (3.5)	43.3 (26.9)	82.5 (51.3)		|		Sanmu
	Yokoshiba 横芝	4.3 (2.7)	47.6 (29.6)	86.8 (53.9)		●		Yokoshibahikari
	Iigura 飯倉	3.8 (2.4)	51.4 (31.9)	90.6 (56.3)		|		Sōsa
	Yōkaichiba 八日市場	3.1 (1.9)	54.5 (33.9)	93.7 (58.2)		●		Sōsa
	Higata 干潟	5.1 (3.2)	59.6 (37.0)	98.8 (61.4)		|		Asahi
	Asahi 旭	4.8 (3.0)	64.4 (40.0)	103.6 (64.4)		●		Asahi
	Iioka 飯岡	2.7 (1.7)	67.1 (41.7)	106.3 (66.1)		●		Asahi
	Kurahashi 倉橋	2.9 (1.8)	70.0 (43.5)	109.2 (67.9)		|		Asahi
	Saruda 猿田	2.6 (1.6)	72.6 (45.1)	111.8 (69.5)		|		Chōshi
	Matsugishi 松岸	5.5 (3.4)	78.1 (48.5)	117.3 (72.9)		|	■ Narita Line	Chōshi
	Chōshi 銚子	3.2 (2.0)	81.3 (50.5)	120.5 (74.9)		●	■ Narita Line; Choshi Electric Railway (CD01)	Chōshi

== Rolling stock ==
=== Limited express ===
- E257-500 series (Shiosai 5-car)
- E259 series (Narita Express, Shiosai)

=== Local/Rapid ===
==== Sōbu Main Line ====
- 209-2000/2100 series EMUs
- E235-1000 series EMUs (since 21 December 2020)

== History ==
=== Private construction ===
Initially, the line was constructed by a private company, Sōbu Railway(Japanese: 総武鉄道, Japanese pronunciation: [Sōbu Tetsudō]). It opened the first service sections, between Ichikawa and Sakura on July 20, 1894, and extended to Tokyo City. In December of the same year, Honjo(Japanese: 本所, now Kinshichō) was opened, and in 1904, on the east bank of Sumida River, Ryōgokubashi (Japanese: 両国橋, now Ryōgoku) became a terminal of this line. The access routes to the west, to Tokyo City, were tramways for passengers and ships for freight. From Sahara to the east, this line reached another terminus, Chōshi in 1897.

=== Nationalisation ===
The line was nationalized in 1907 under the Railway Nationalization Act, and was double-tracked from Ryōgokubashi to Chiba the next year. The predecessor of the Japanese National Railways (JNR) planned to connect with other lines inside Tokyo. In 1932, a new passenger line was opened from Ochanomizu to Ryōgoku (with new platform besides the original terminal facility), and a frequent service of EMUs commenced. Electrification to Chiba was completed in 1935, and local trains have run through from the Chūō line since then. But, except for a few trains, no rapid service was operated on this line, and the passengers had to use the local train, or its rival, Keisei Electric Railway.

=== Bombing of Tokyo ===
On March 10, 1945, the Bombing of Tokyo caused casualties estimated at 70,000–100,000, and destroyed stations of the line. During the last days of World War II in 1945, the Imperial Japanese Army thought the US Army would attempt a landing operation, "Operation Coronet", on Kujūkuri Beach, and transferred troops on the Sōbu Main Line.

=== Steam trains ===
Between Chiba and Chōshi, in the rural area of Chiba Prefecture, steam traction was used until recently. Fish and soy sauce from Chōshi were major freight items. Because Tokyo was close, JNR did not provide rapid or express trains from Ryōgoku to Chōshi until 1958. JNR operated tourist trains from Ryōgoku to the seaside resorts on the coast from the 1950s.

=== Five-destination operation ===
In the 1960s, JNR started the Five-Destination Operation (Japanese: 五方面作戦, Japanese pronunciation: [Go Hōmen Sakusen]) to steeply increase commuter demand, and it determined that a new rapid line would be constructed from Tokyo Station to Chiba. A new underground line from Tokyo to Kinshichō, and a four-tracked section to Tsudanuma were opened in 1972, and the operator began frequent rapid services from Tokyo to Chiba. The line was managed by the East Japan Railway Company (JR East) from 1987. The parallel Keiyō Line was opened closer to the coast in 1990. It was first constructed for freight services but later to carry passengers.

=== Further electrification ===
To the east of Chiba, electrification reached Chōshi in 1974, and Limited Express Shiosai has been operated from the underground Tokyo Station since 1975. Freight services from Chōshi ceased in 1986, just before the privatization of JNR, and regular passenger trains stopped using the Ryōgoku terminal platforms in 1988. JR East started a new airport train, the Narita Express in 1991. Rapid urbanization around Chiba Station made this section important for commuter traffic, for the city of Chiba, and for Greater Tokyo.

=== Former connecting lines ===
- Shimosa-Nakayama station (see Chuo-Sobu Line) - A 2 km (1.2 mi) 610 mm (2 ft) gauge human powered line, built to haul sweet potatoes and firewood, but which also carried passengers from 1911, operated to Kamagaya between 1908 and 1918.
- Yachimata station - The Narita Railway Co. opened a 14 km (8.7 mi), 600 mm (1 ft 11 5/8 in) gauge line to Sanrizuka in 1917. In 1928 the line was converted to 1,067 mm (3 ft 6 in) gauge in conjunction with the extension of the Tako Line (see next entry) to Youkaichiba via Sanrizuka. The line closed in 1940.
- Youkaichiba station - The Narita Railway Co. operated the Tako line, 30 km (19 mi) in length, to Narita between 1928 and 1944.
