= Chiba Institute of Science =

Private university in Chōshi, Chiba, Japan

Coordinates: 35°42′14.76″N 140°50′39.95″E

- 千葉科学大学; Chiba kagaku daigaku
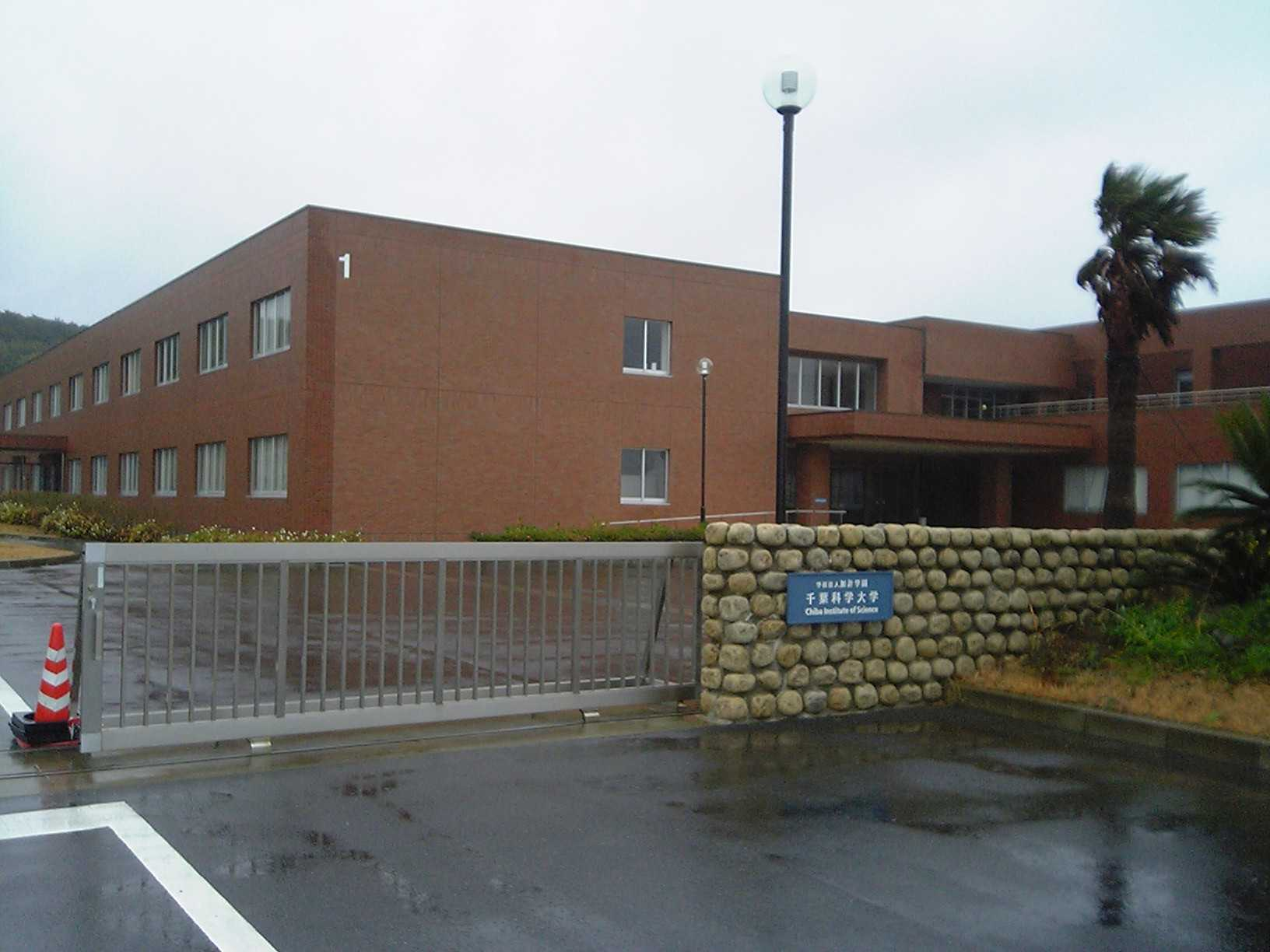
- Type: Private
- Established: 2004
- Location: Chōshi, Chiba, Japan
- Website: www.cis.ac.jp

Chiba Institute of Science (千葉科学大学, Chiba kagaku daigaku) is a private university in Chōshi, Chiba, Japan, established in 2004.
