= Asahi Station (Chiba) =

Railway station in Asahi, Chiba Prefecture, Japan

Asahi Station 旭駅
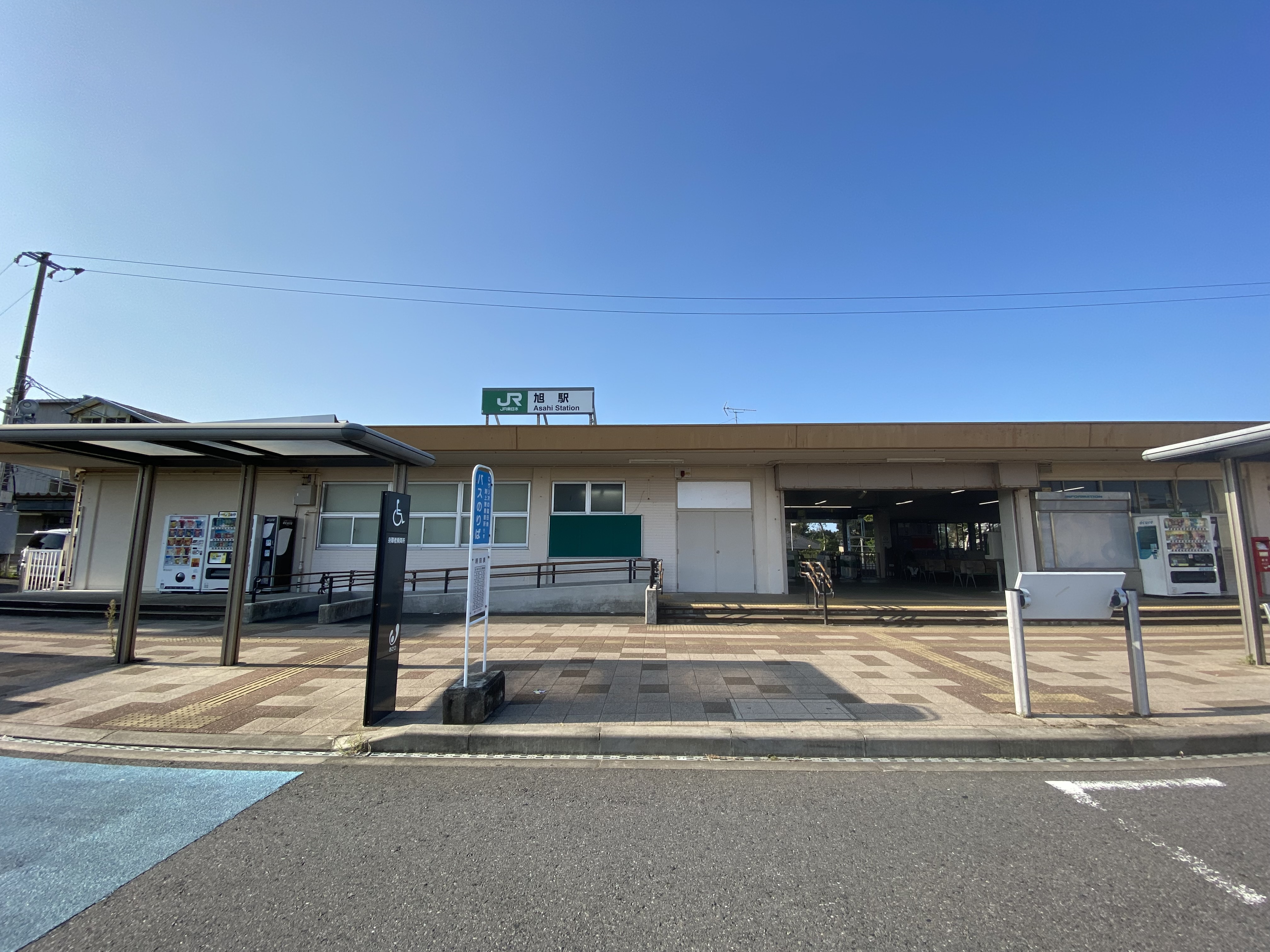
- Asahi Station, August 2021

General information
- Location: 677 Ro, Asahi-shi, Chiba-ken 289-2516; Japan
- Coordinates: 35°43′18.58″N 140°39′18.41″E
- Operator: JR East
- Line: ■ Sōbu Main Line
- Distance: 103.6 km from Tokyo
- Platforms: 1 side + 1 island platforms

Other information
- Status: Staffed (Midori no Madoguchi )
- Website: Official website

History
- Opened: 1 June 1897
- Former names: Asahichō (until 1959)

Passengers
- FY2019: 1756

Services
Preceding station	JR East	Following station
Yōkaichiba towards Tokyo	Shiosai	Iioka towards Chōshi
Higata towards Chiba	Sōbu Main Line Local	Iioka towards Chōshi
Location
- Location within Chiba Prefecture Location within Japan

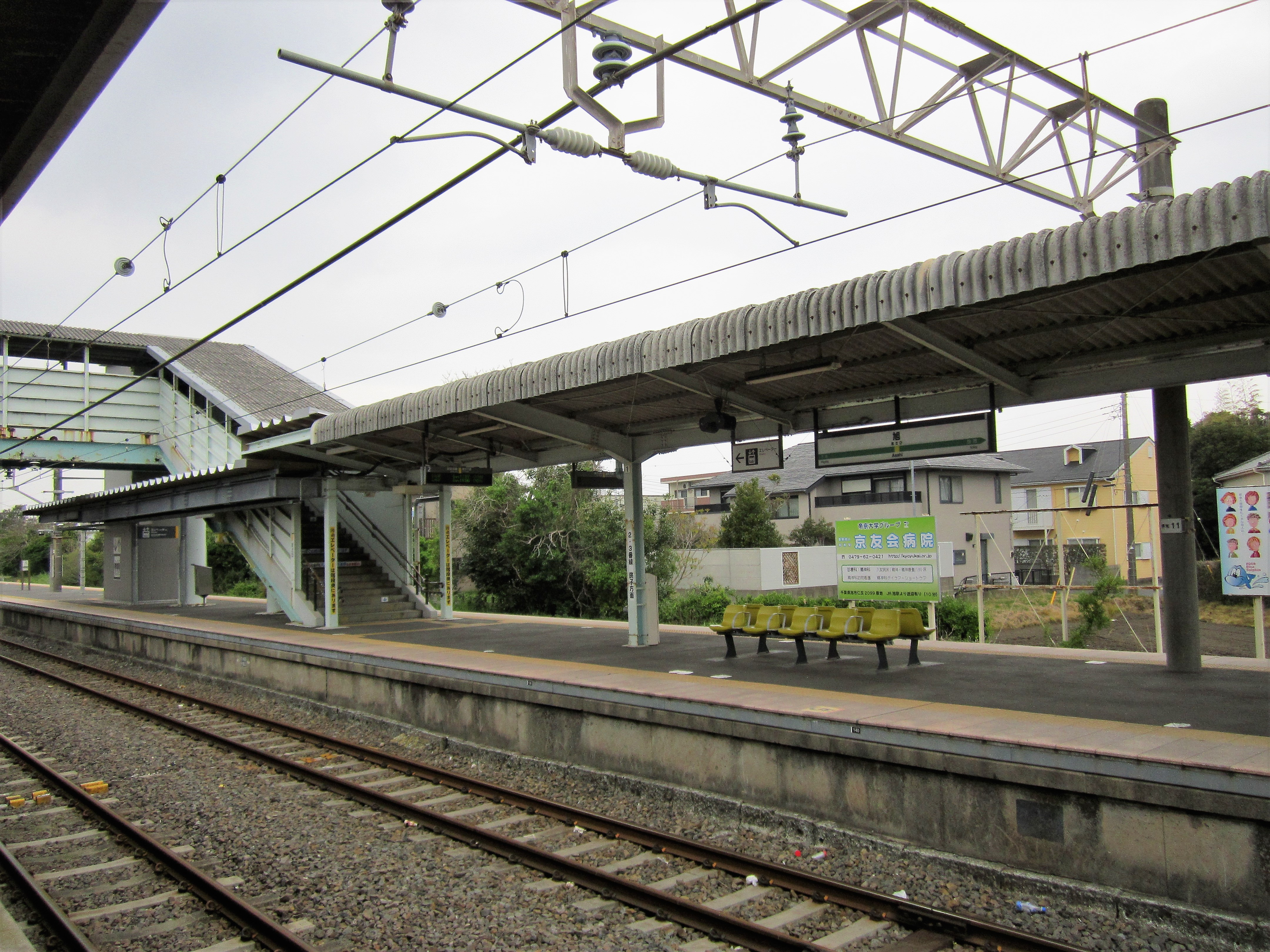
Asahi station platform, 2019.

Asahi Station (旭駅, Asahi-eki) is a passenger railway station in the city of Asahi, Chiba, Japan, operated by the East Japan Railway Company (JR East).

== Lines ==
Asahi Station is served by the Sōbu Main Line between Tokyo and Chōshi, and is located 103.6 kilometers from the western terminus of the Sōbu Main Line at Tokyo Station. Shiosai limited express services between Tokyo and Chōshi also stop at this station.

== Station layout ==
The station consists of a side platform and an island platform, connected by a footbridge. The station has a Midori no Madoguchi staffed ticket office.

=== Platforms ===
1	■ Sōbu Main Line	For Yōkaichiba, Narutō, Chiba
2,3	■ Sōbu Main Line	For Chōshi

== History ==
Asahi Station opened on 1 June 1897 as Asahichō Station (旭町駅, Asahichō-eki) on the Sōbu Railway for both passenger and freight operations. On 1 September 1907, the Sōbu Railway was nationalised, becoming part of the Japanese Government Railway (JGR). After World War II, the JGR became the Japanese National Railways (JNR). The station was renamed Asahi Station on 1 October 1959. Scheduled freight operations were suspended from 1 July 1973. The station was absorbed into the JR East network upon the privatization of the Japanese National Railways (JNR) on 1 April 1987.

== Passenger statistics ==
In fiscal 2019, the station was used by an average of 1756 passengers daily (boarding passengers only).

== Surrounding area ==
- National Route 126
- Asahi General Hospital
- Chiba Prefectural Eastern Library
- Chiba Toso Cultural Center
- Chiba Prefectural Asahi Agricultural High School

== See also ==
- List of railway stations in Japan
