= Yōkaichiba Station =

Railway station in Sōsa, Chiba Prefecture, Japan

Yōkaichiba Station 八日市場駅
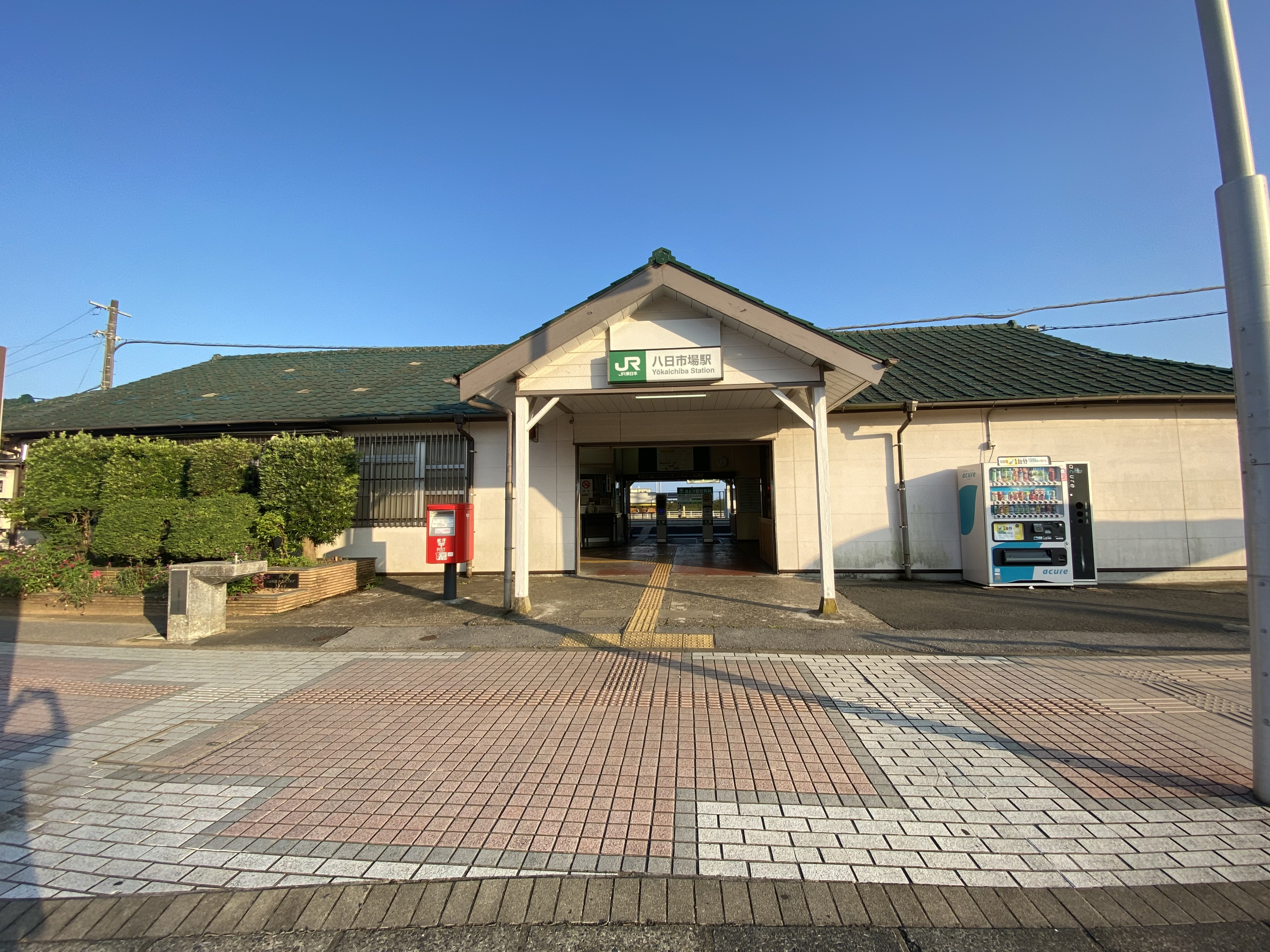
- Station front, August 2021

General information
- Location: Yōkaichiba I, Sōsa-shi, Chiba-ken 289-2144; Japan
- Coordinates: 35.69931°N 140.55240°E
- Operator: JR East
- Line: ■ Sōbu Main Line
- Distance: 93.7 km from Tokyo
- Platforms: 2 side platforms

Other information
- Status: Staffed ("Midori no Madoguchi" )
- Website: Official website

History
- Opened: 1 June 1897

Passengers
- FY2019: 1763

Services
Preceding station	JR East	Following station
Yokoshiba towards Tokyo	Shiosai	Asahi towards Chōshi
Iigura towards Chiba	Sōbu Main Line Local	Higata towards Chōshi
Location
- Location within Chiba Prefecture Location within Japan

Yōkaichiba Station (八日市場駅, Yōkaichiba-eki) is a passenger railway station in the city of Sōsa, Chiba Japan, operated by the East Japan Railway Company (JR East).

== Lines ==
Yōkaichiba Station is served by the Sōbu Main Line between Tokyo and Chōshi, and is located 93.7 rail km from the western terminus of the Sōbu Main Line at Tokyo Station. Shiosai limited express services stop at this station.

== Station layout ==
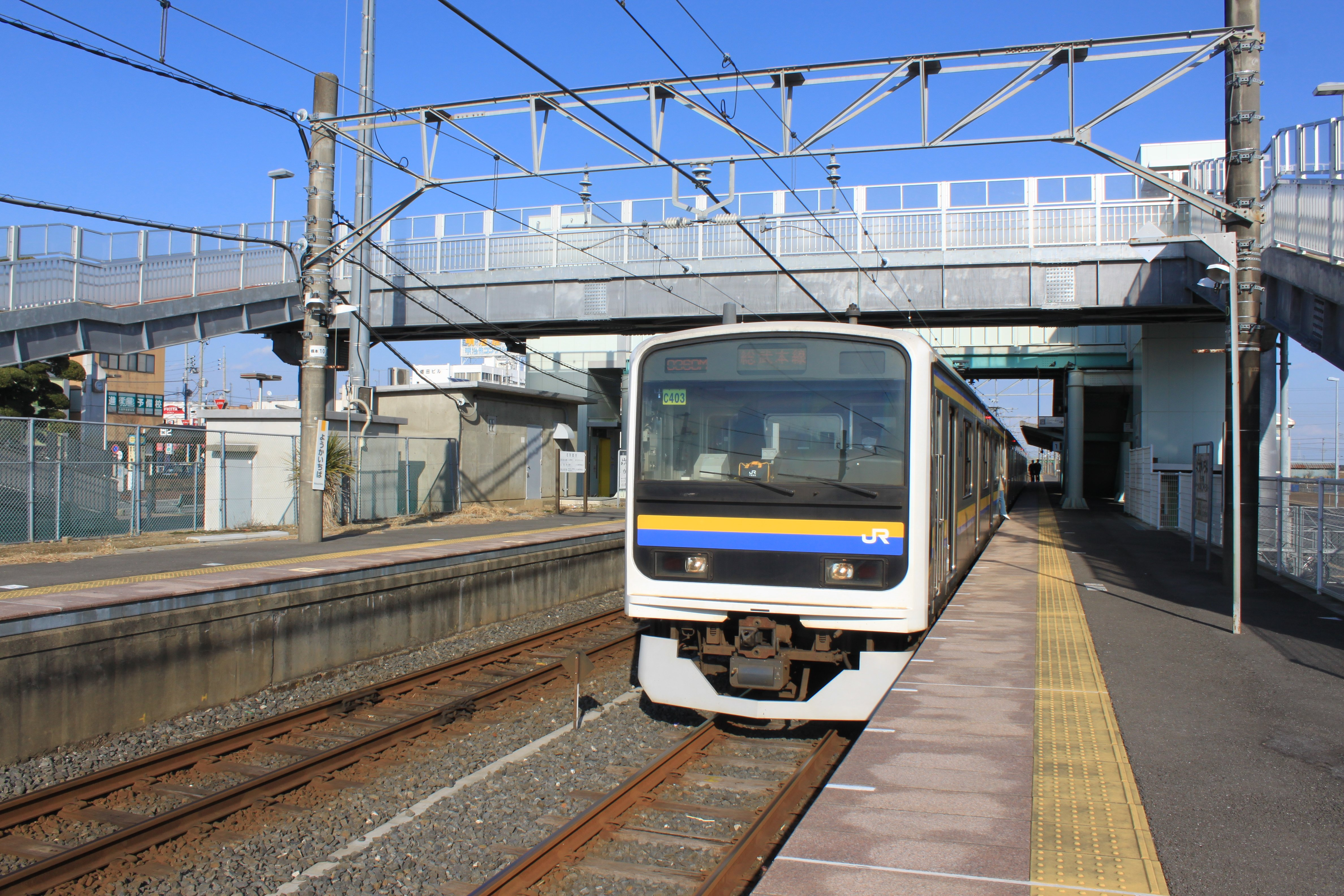
View of the platforms. January 2012

Yōkaichiba Station has a two opposed side platforms, connected by a footbridge. The station has a "Midori no Madoguchi" staffed ticket office.

=== Platforms ===
1	■ Sōbu Main Line	for Asahi, Narutō, and Chiba
2	■ Sōbu Main Line	for Chōshi

== History ==
Yōkaichiba Station opened on 1 June 1897 as a station on the Sōbu Railway for both passenger and freight operations. On 1 September 1907, the Sōbu Railway was nationalised, becoming part of the Japanese Government Railway (JGR). On 5 December 1926, the Chiba Prefectural Railway Tako Line also started operations to this station. (Later renamed the Narita Railway Tako Line, services were discontinued on 11 January 1944, and the line abolished in 1946). After World War II, the JGR became the Japanese National Railways (JNR). Scheduled freight operations were suspended from 1 October 1974. The station was absorbed into the JR East network upon the privatization of JNR on 1 April 1987. The north exit plaza was renovated in 1989, and a new bus terminal completed in 1995.

== Passenger statistics ==
In fiscal 2019, the station was used by an average of 1762 passengers daily (boarding passengers only).

== Surrounding area ==
- Sōsa City Office
- Sōsa Police Station
- Keiai University Yōkaichiba High School
- Chiba Prefectural Sōsa High School

== See also ==
- List of railway stations in Japan
