= Chōshi Station =

Railway station in Chōshi, Chiba Prefecture, Japan

Chōshi Station 銚子駅
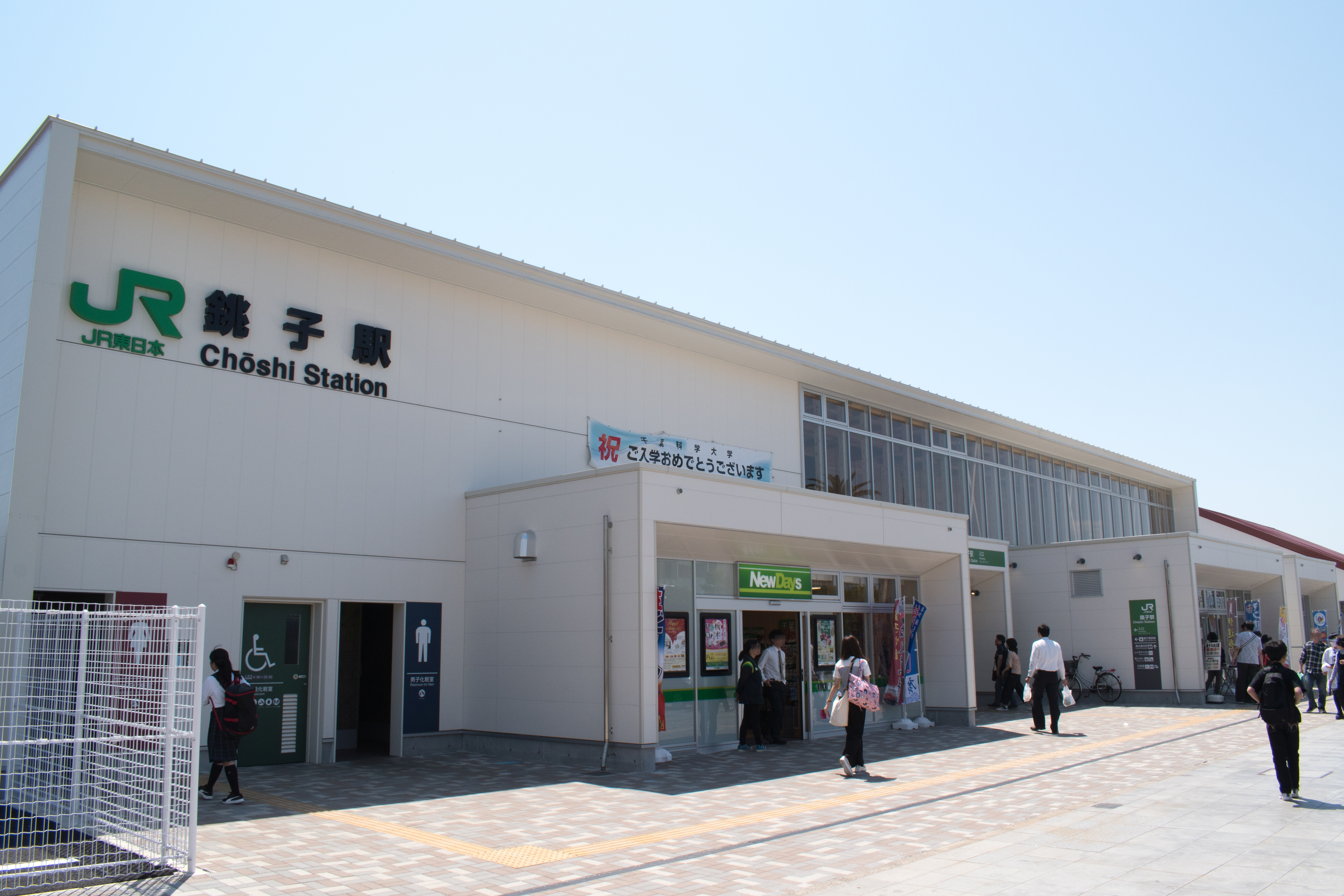
- Chōshi Station exterior in May 2018

General information
- Location: Nishi-shibachō; Chōshi, Chiba; Japan
- Coordinates: 35°43′45″N 140°49′39″E
- Operator: JR East; Choshi Electric Railway
- Lines: Sōbu Main Line; Chōshi Electric Railway Line
- Distance: 120.5 km (74.9 mi) from Tokyo via Sōbu Main Line; 6.4 km (4.0 mi) from Tokawa
- Platforms: 1 island platform, 2 side platforms
- Connections: Bus terminal

Other information
- Station code: CD01
- Website: Official website

History
- Opened: 1 June 1897
- Rebuilt: 1936, 1948, 2018

Passengers
- JFY2019: 3,045 daily (JR East)
- JFY2018: 384 daily (Choshi)

Services
| Preceding station | JR East | Following station |
|---|---|---|
| Iioka towards Tokyo | Shiosai | Terminus |
| Matsugishi towards Chiba | Sōbu Main Line Local | Terminus |
| Matsugishi towards Chiba | Narita Line | Terminus |
| Preceding station | Choshi Electric Railway | Following station |
| Terminus | Chōshi Electric Railway Line | Nakanochō towards Tokawa |
Location
- Location within Chiba Prefecture Location within Japan

Chōshi Station (Japanese: 銚子駅, Hepburn: Chōshi-eki) is an interchange passenger railway station in the city of Chōshi, Chiba, Japan, operated by the East Japan Railway Company (JR East) and also used by the private railway operator Choshi Electric Railway.

== Lines ==
Chōshi Station is the eastern terminal station of the Sōbu Main Line and serves some through trains on the Narita Line to Sawara and Narita. It is 120.5 km (74.9 mi) from the western terminus of the Sōbu Main Line at Tokyo Station. It also forms the terminus of the privately operated Chōshi Electric Railway Line to Tokawa.

== Station layout ==
The JR East station facilities consist of one side platform and one island platform serving three tracks. A bay platform is located between the JR platforms 2 and 3 for Choshi Electric Railway trains. The station has a "Midori no Madoguchi" staffed ticket office.

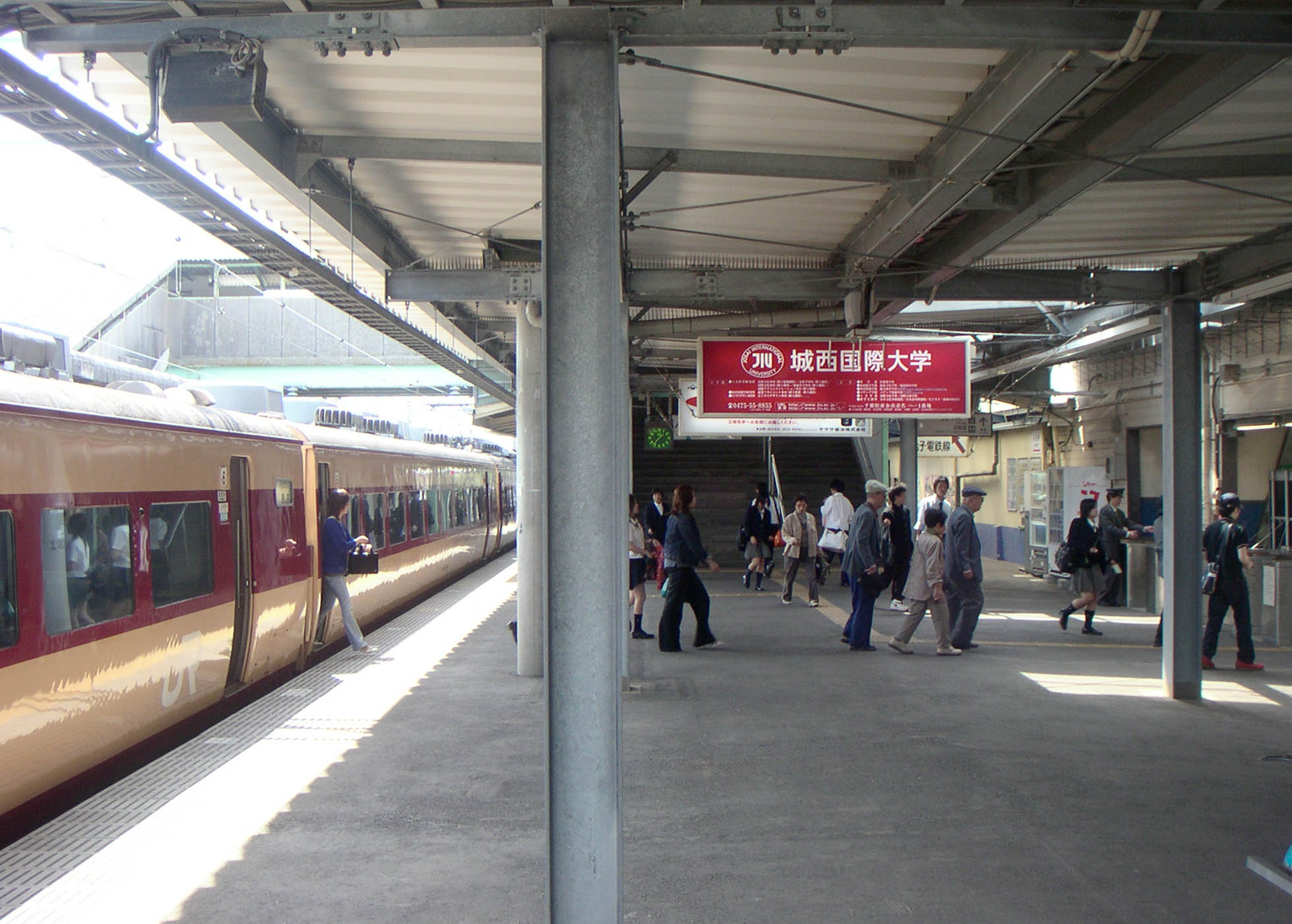
Platform 1 in May 2005

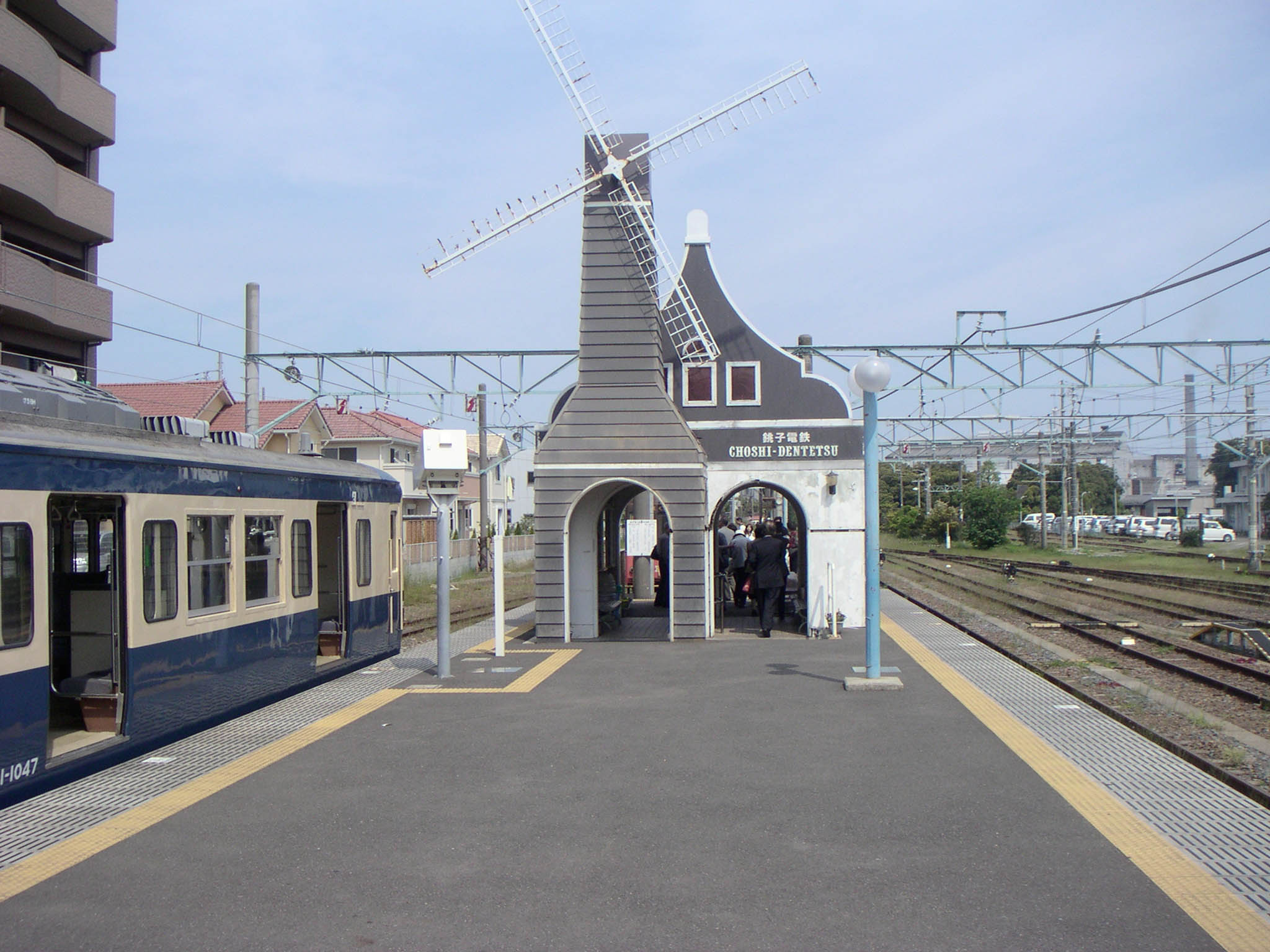
The Dutch-style shelter for the Chōshi Electric Railway Line platform in May 2005

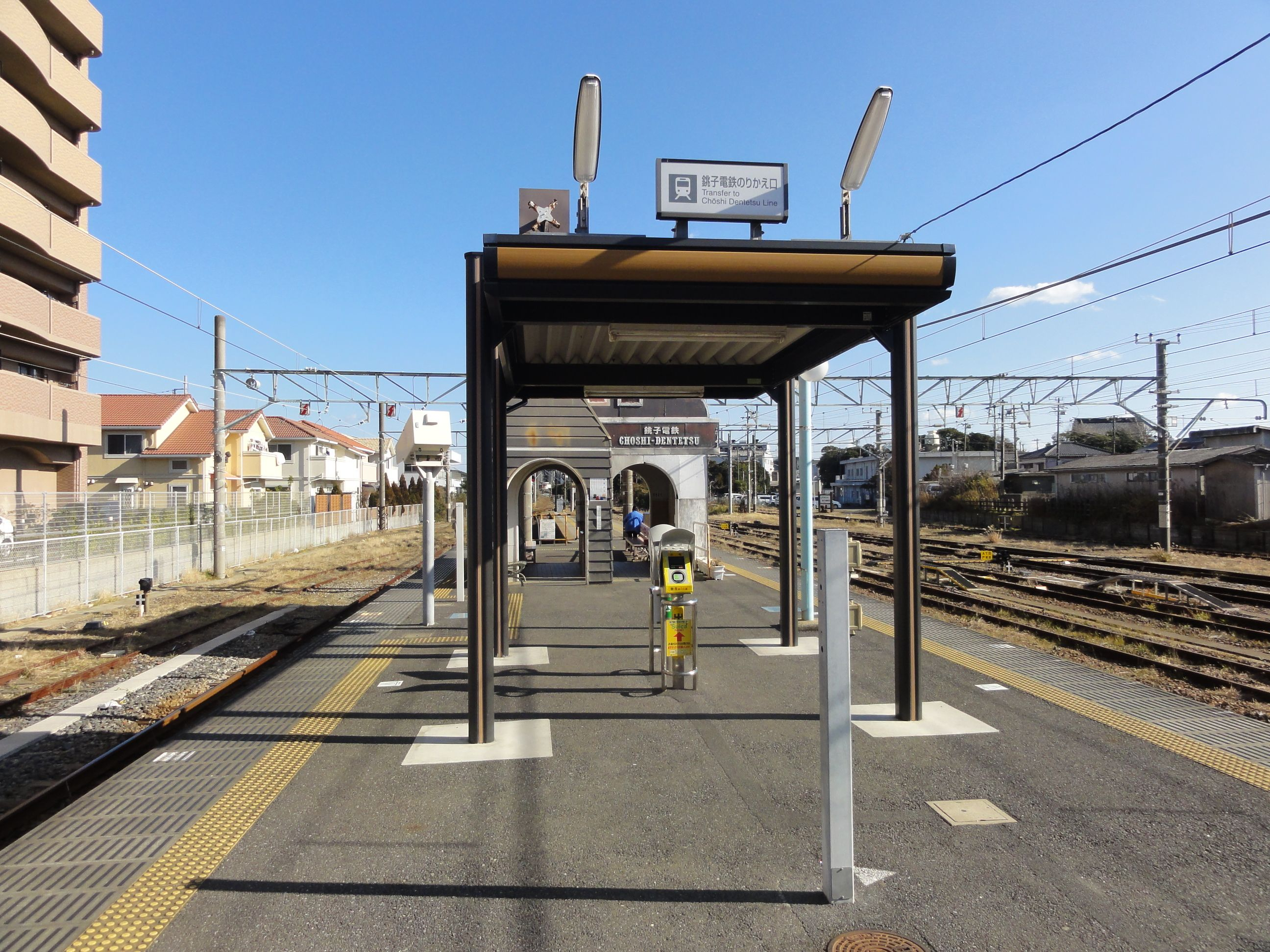
A Suica wicket for passengers transferring between JR East and the Choshi Electric Railway on platforms 2/3 in January 2012

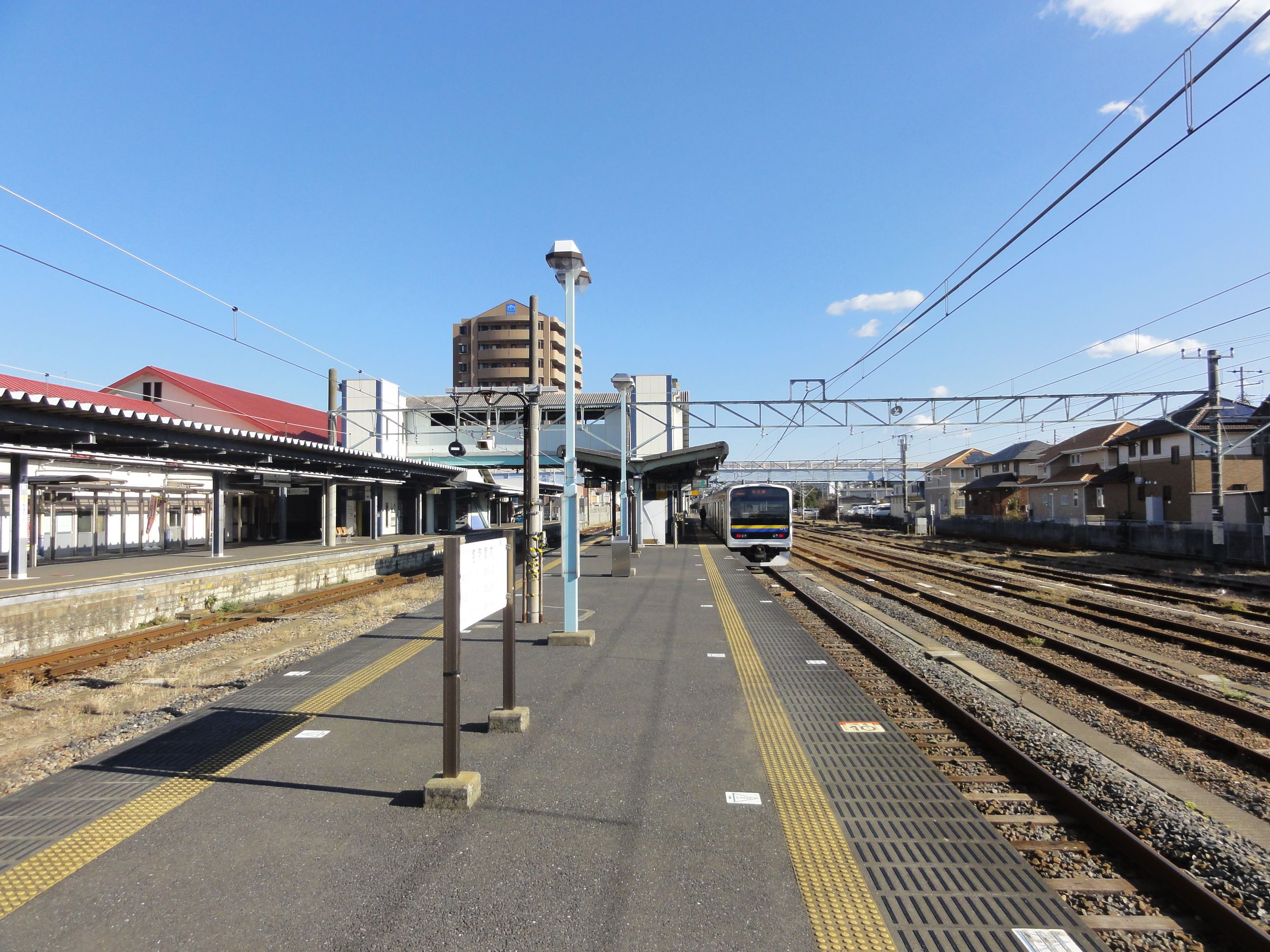
The west end of platforms 2/3 in January 2012

=== Platforms ===
| 1 | ■ Sōbu Main Line | for Yōkaichiba, Narutō, Chiba, and Tokyo |
| 1 | ■ Shiosai | Limited express for Yōkaichiba, Narutō, Chiba, and Tokyo |
| 2 | ■ Sōbu Main Line | for Asahi, Yōkaichiba, Narutō, and Chiba |
| - | ■ Chōshi Electric Railway Line | for Tokawa |
| 3 | ■ Narita Line | for Sawara, Narita, and Chiba |

== History ==
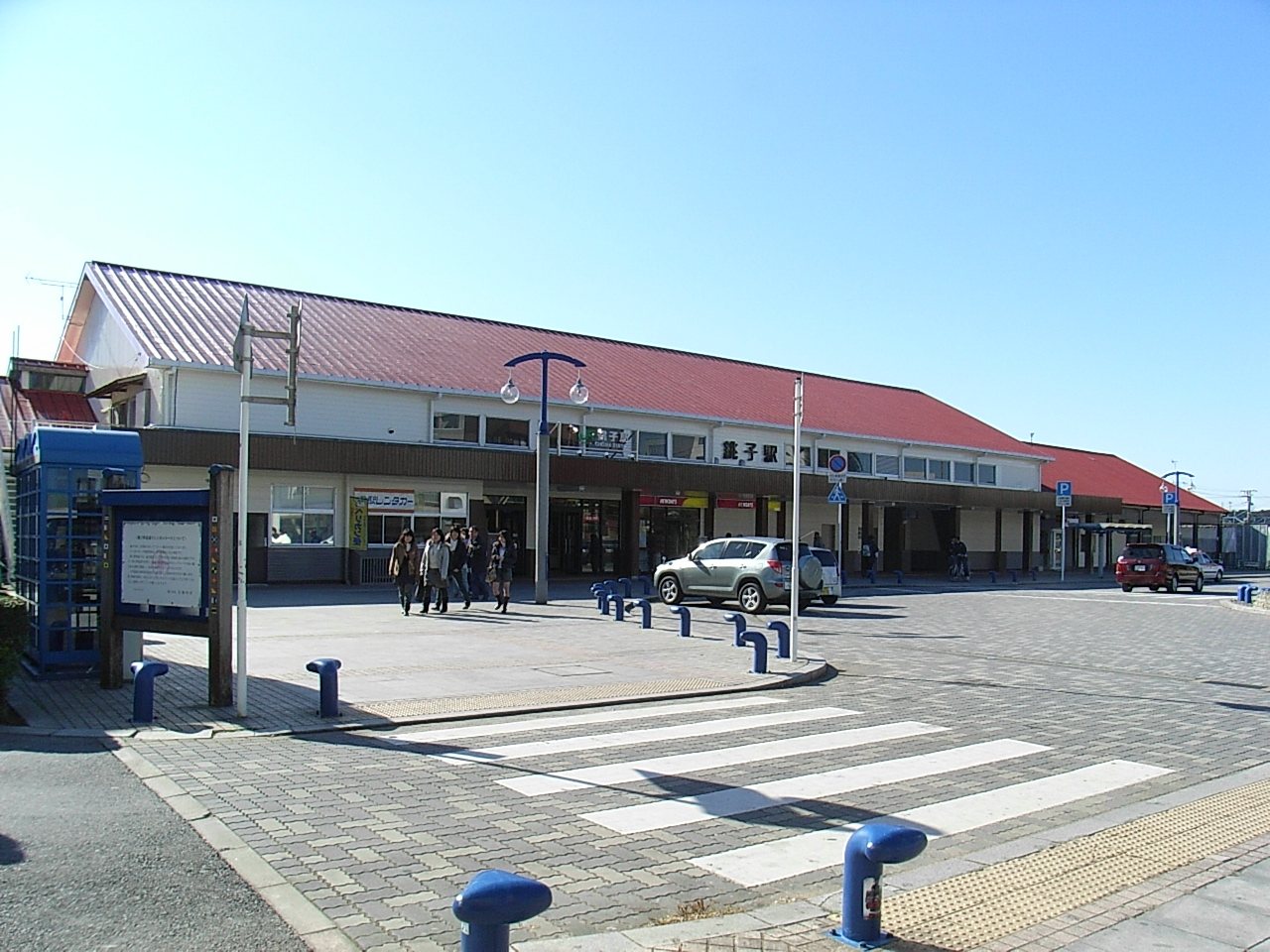
Former station exterior in January 2007

Chōshi Station opened on 1 June 1897 as a station on the Sōbu Railway. On 1 September 1907, the Sōbu Railway was nationalized, becoming part of the Japanese Government Railway (JGR).

The Chōshi Electric Railway Line from Choshi to Tokawa opened on 5 July 1923, using the trackbed and infrastructure of the earlier Chōshi Sightseeing Railway (銚子遊覧鉄道, Chōshi Yūran Tetsudō), which operated between Chōshi and Inuboh from December 1913 to November 1917. The original station building was replaced by a new two-storey wood-frame-and-mortar building in 1936. An additional platform was added at the same time, and a new underground passage was opened linking the new platform. The 1936 station building lasted only nine years, as it was destroyed in 1945 by fire during World War II. The third-generation station building was completed in January 1948, and a further platform was added at the same time, creating the three-platform arrangement that continues to this day.

After World War II, JGR became the Japanese National Railways (JNR). Scheduled freight operations were suspended from 31 March 1978. The station was absorbed into the JR East network upon the privatization of JNR on 1 April 1987.

A roof was added to the entrance to the Choshi Electric Railway platform in December 1974, and this was replaced by the present-day Dutch-style building in November 1990.

== Passenger statistics ==
In fiscal 2019, the JR portion of the station was used by an average of 3045 passengers daily (boarding passengers only). In fiscal 2018, the Choshi Electric Railway station was used by an average of 384 passengers daily (boarding passengers only). The passenger figures for previous years are as shown below.

| Fiscal year | Daily average | |
| Fiscal year | JR East | Choshi Electric Railway |
|---|---|---|
| 2000 | 4,174 | |
| 2001 | 4,055 | |
| 2002 | 3,868 | |
| 2003 | 3,768 | |
| 2004 | 3,743 | |
| 2005 | 3,693 | |
| 2006 | 3,605 | |
| 2007 | 3,481 | 935 |
| 2008 | 3,324 | 889 |
| 2009 | 3,249 | 795 |
| 2010 | 3,352 | 673 |
| 2011 | 3,366 | |
| 2012 | 3,395 | |
| ... | | |
| 2018 | | 384 |
| 2019 | 3,045 | |

== Surrounding area ==
- Chōshi City Office
- Chiba Institute of Science
- Yamasa head office and soy sauce factory
- Higeta soy sauce factory
- Choshi Camera Museum
- Futaba Elementary School
- Tone River
- National Route 124
- National Route 356

== Bus terminal ==
The following long-distance buses operate from Choshi Station.

| Bus stop | No | Via | destination | Company | Note |
|---|---|---|---|---|---|
| 1 | Kasugadai Line(circular-route bus) | Shiritsu-Kōkō mae→Kasugadai→Misaki | Choshi Station | Keisei Taxi Narita | Runs only in the morning |
| 1 | Kasugadai Line(circular-route bus) | Misaki→Kasugadai→Shiritsu-Kōkō mae→Kasugadai | Choshi Station | Keisei Taxi Narita | Runs only in the evening |
| 2 | Asahi-Choshi Line | Misaki・Aeon Choshi・Tasaki-Jinja・Īoka Shisyo(Īoka beach・Hagizono beach) | Asahi Station (Chiba) | Chiba Kōtsū | |
| 2 | Aeon Shuttle Line | Non stop | Aeon Mall Choshi | Chiba Kōtsū | |
| 2 | Toyosato Newtown Line | Matsugishi Station・Shiishiba Station・Shimosa-Toyosato Station | Toyosato Newtown No.4 | Chiba Kōtsū | |
| 3 | Express bus Inuboh(Expressway bus) | Asahi-chuo Hospital Higashi | Tokyo Station | Keisei Bus・Chiba Kōtsū | Asahi route |
| 3 | Express bus Tone Liner(Expressway bus) | Shisui Premium Outlets | Tokyo Station | Chiba Kōtsū | Omigawa・Sawara route |
| 4 | Kawaguchi Line | Choshi-kannon・Kawaguchi | Choshi-port Center | Keisei Taxi Narita | |
| 4 | Misaki-meguri Shuttle | Port Tower Wosse・Ashikajima Station・Kimigahama Station・Inubosaki Lighthouse・Inuboh Station | Chikyū Tembōkan | Chiba Kōtsu | |
| 5 | Southern Cross(Night bus) | Kyoto Station・Osaka Station・Namba Station | USJ | Chiba Kōtsu・Nankai Bus | |
| 5 | Nagasaki Line | Choshi-ginza・Nagasaki | Kokumin-syukusya(Hotel) | Chiba Kōtsu | |
| 5 | Naarai Line | Naarai・Choshi Marina(Byobugaura) | Chiba Kagaku Daigaku | Chiba Kōtsu | |
| 6 | Ashikajima Line(circular-route bus) | Kasagami-Kurohae Station→Ashikajima Station | Choshi Station | Keisei Taxi Narita | Runs only in the morning |
| 6 | Ashikajima Line(circular-route bus) | Ashikajima Station→Kasagami-Kurohae Station | Choshi Station | Keisei Taxi Narita | Runs only in the evening |
| 6 | Tokawa Line | Inuboh Station | Togawa Shako(Tokawa Station) | Keisei Taxi Narita | |
| 7 | Tonegawa Line | Hasaki | Kashima-Jingū Station | Kanto Railway | It is possible to transfer onto the Expressway bus Hasaki, which is bound to Tokyo at Hasaki bus stop. |
| 7 | Kaigan Line | Hasaki・Hasaki chuo | Hasaki Kaisuiyokuzyō | Kanto Railway | It is possible to transfer onto the Expressway bus Hasaki, which is bound to Tokyo at Hasaki bus stop. |

== See also ==
- List of railway stations in Japan
