= Kobayashi Station (Chiba) =

Railway station in Inzai, Chiba Prefecture, Japan

Kobayashi Station 小林駅
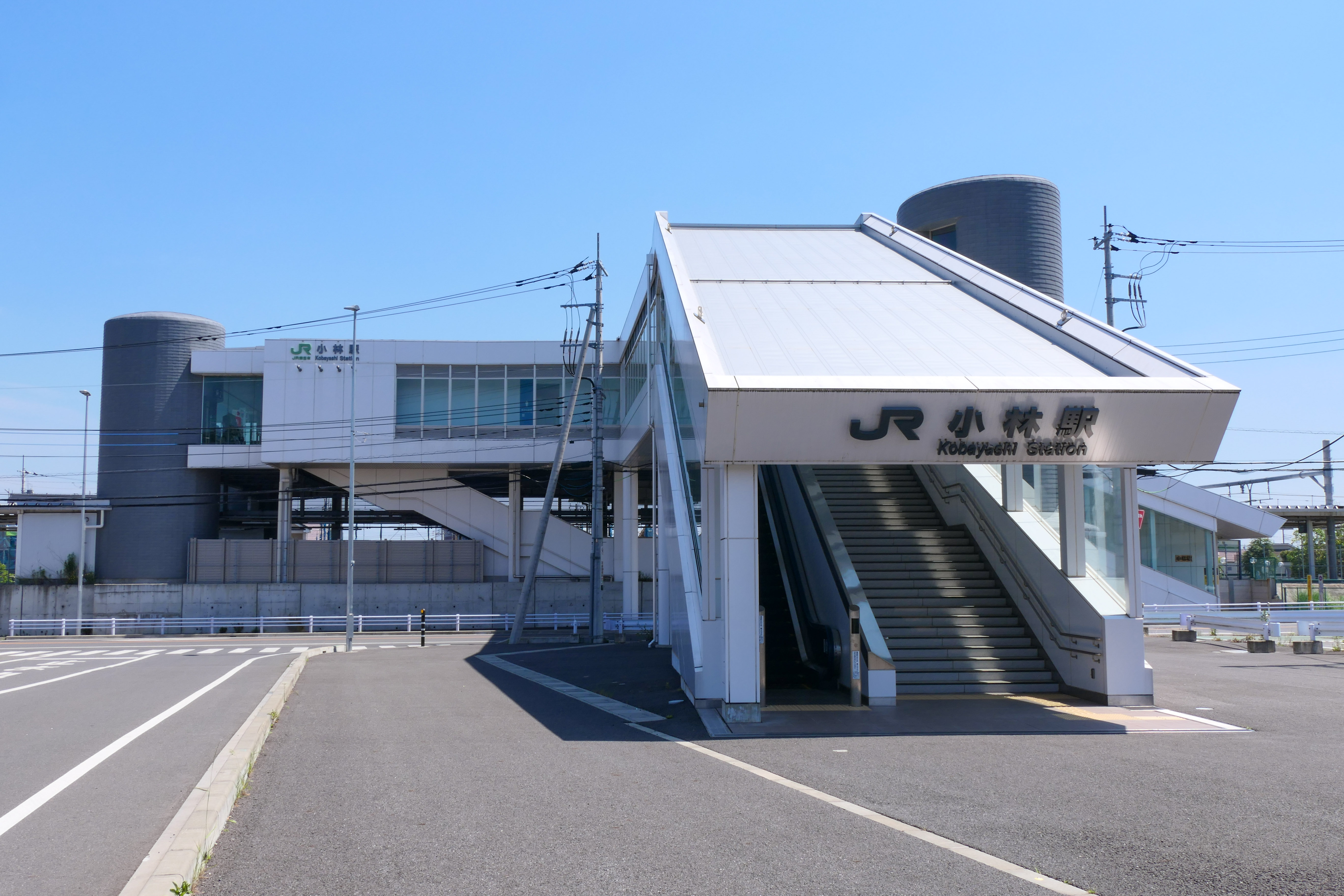
- Kobayashi Station in May 2021

General information
- Location: 2-Chome Kobayashikita, Inzai-shi, Chiba-ken 270-1313; Japan
- Coordinates: 35°49′49.95″N 140°11′35.84″E
- Operator: JR East
- Line: ■ Narita Line
- Distance: 18.3 km from Abiko
- Platforms: 2 side platforms

Other information
- Status: Unstaffed
- Website: Official website

History
- Opened: April 1, 1901

Passengers
- FY2019: 1953

Services
Preceding station	JR East	Following station
Kioroshi towards Abiko	Narita Line Abiko branch	Ajiki towards Narita
Location
- Location within Chiba Prefecture Location within Japan

Kobayashi Station (小林駅, Kobayashi-eki) is a passenger railway station located in the city of Inzai, Chiba Prefecture Japan, operated by the East Japan Railway Company (JR East).

== Lines ==
Kobayashi Station is served by the Abiko Branch Line of the Narita Line, and is located 18.3 kilometers from the terminus of the branch line at Abiko Station.

== Layout ==
The station is an elevated station boult above dual opposed side platforms. The station is unstaffed with help directed to an intercom.

=== Platforms ===
1	■ Narita Line	for Narita
2	■ Narita Line	for Abiko and Ueno

== History ==
Kobayashi Station was opened on April 1, 1901 as a station on the Narita Railway Company for both freight and passenger operations. On September 1, 1920, the Narita Railway was nationalised, becoming part of the Japanese Government Railway (JGR). After World War II, the JGR became the Japan National Railways (JNR). Scheduled freight operations were suspended from November 1, 1961. The station was absorbed into the JR East network upon the privatization of the Japan National Railways (JNR) on April 1, 1987.

== Passenger statistics ==
In fiscal 2019, the station was used by an average of 1,953 passengers daily (boarding passengers only).

== Surrounding area ==
- National Route 356
- Kobayashi Middle School

== See also ==
- List of railway stations in Japan
