= Fusa Station =

Railway station in Abiko, Chiba Prefecture, Japan

Fusa Station 布佐駅
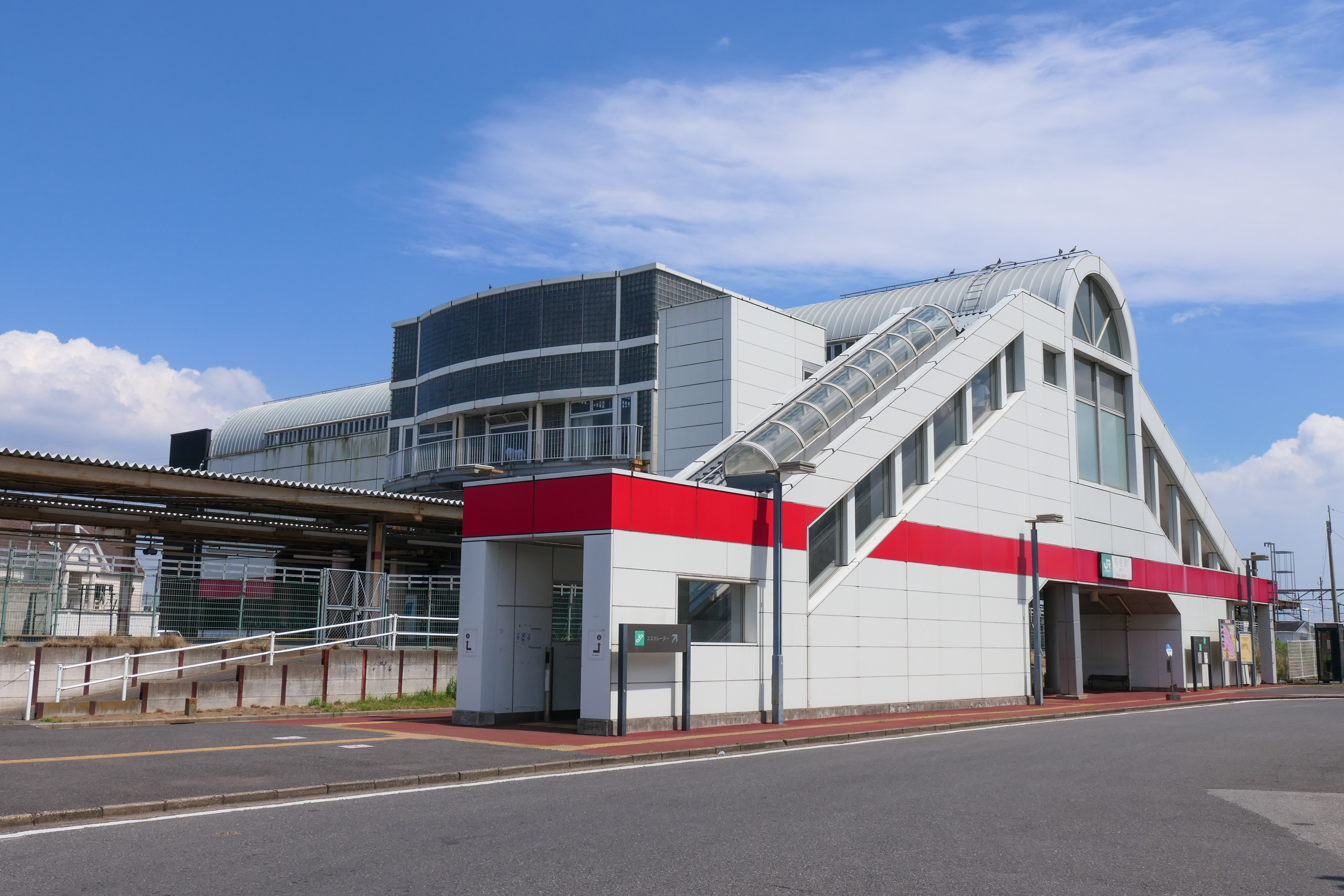
- Fusa Station in May 2021

General information
- Location: Fusa 2812, Abiko-shi, Chiba-ken 270-1101; Japan
- Coordinates: 35.8495°N 140.1327°E
- Operator: JR East
- Line: ■ Narita Line
- Distance: 12.1 km from Abiko
- Platforms: 2 side platforms

Other information
- Status: Staffed
- Website: Official website

History
- Opened: April 1, 1901

Passengers
- 2019: 3156 daily

Services
Preceding station	JR East	Following station
Araki towards Abiko	Narita Line Abiko branch	Kioroshi towards Narita
Location
- Location within Chiba Prefecture Location within Japan

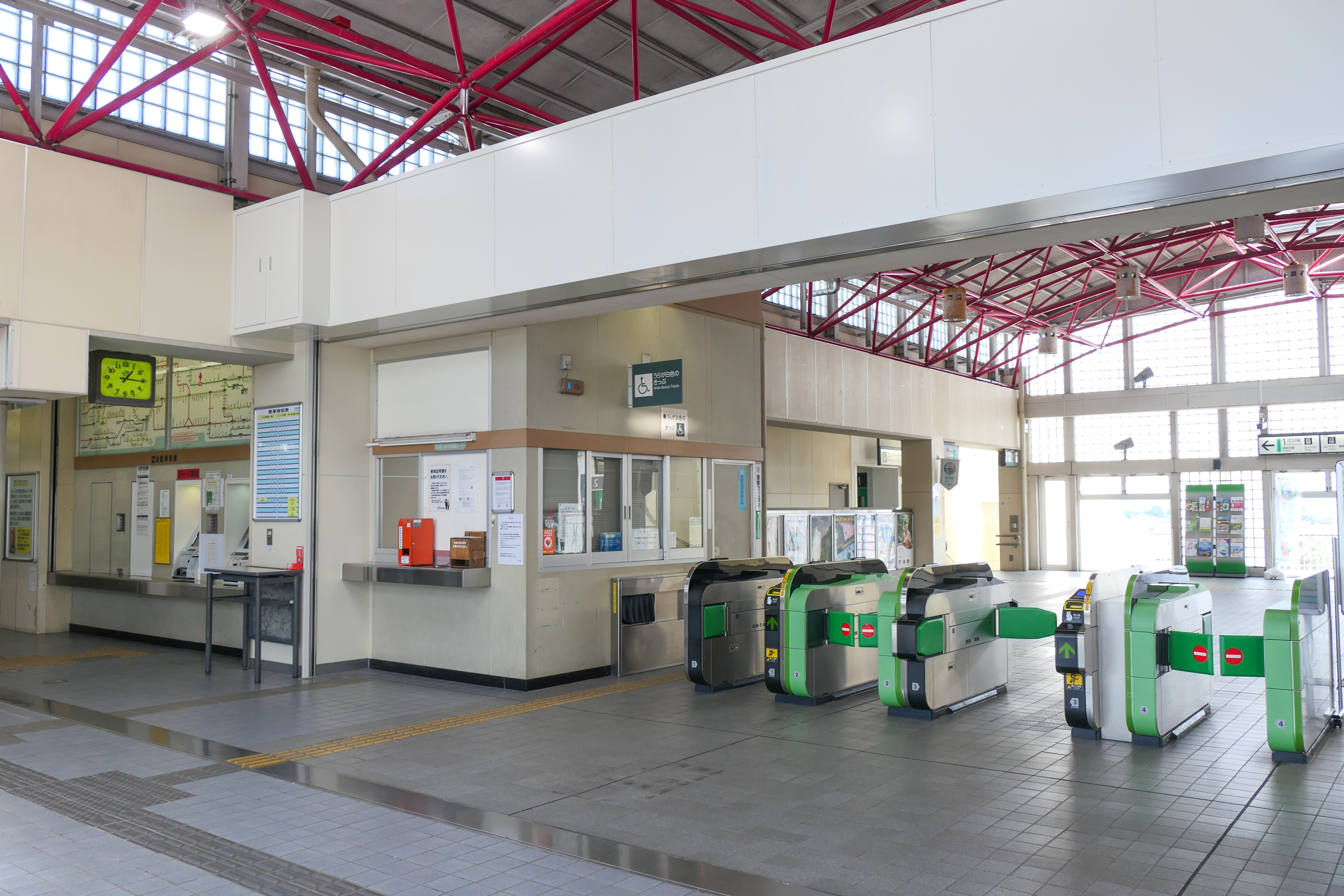
The ticket barriers in May 2021

Fusa Station (布佐駅, Fusa-eki) is a passenger railway station in the city of Abiko, Chiba Prefecture Japan, operated by the East Japan Railway Company (JR East).

== Lines ==
Fusa Station is served by the Abiko Branch Line of the Narita Line, and is located 12.1 kilometers from the terminus of branch line at Abiko Station.

== Station layout ==
The station is an elevated station with dual opposed side platforms. The station building is built on a cantilever above and across the platform. The station is staffed.

=== Platforms ===
1	■ Narita Line	For Narita
2	■ Narita Line	For Abiko, Ueno

== History ==
Fusa Station was opened on April 1, 1901 as a station on the Narita Railway Company for both freight and passenger operations. On September 1, 1920, the Narita Railway was nationalised, becoming part of the Japanese Government Railway (JGR). After World War II, the JGR became the Japan National Railways (JNR). Scheduled freight operations were suspended from October 1, 1962. The station was absorbed into the JR East network upon the privatization of the Japan National Railways (JNR) on April 1, 1987. The station building was rebuilt in 1993, and modernized from 2005–2006.

== Passenger statistics ==
In fiscal 2019, the station was used by an average of 3156 passengers daily.

== Surrounding area ==
- National Route 356
- Abiko Higashi High School

== See also ==
- List of railway stations in Japan
