= Araki Station (Chiba) =

Railway station in Abiko, Chiba Prefecture, Japan

Araki Station 新木駅
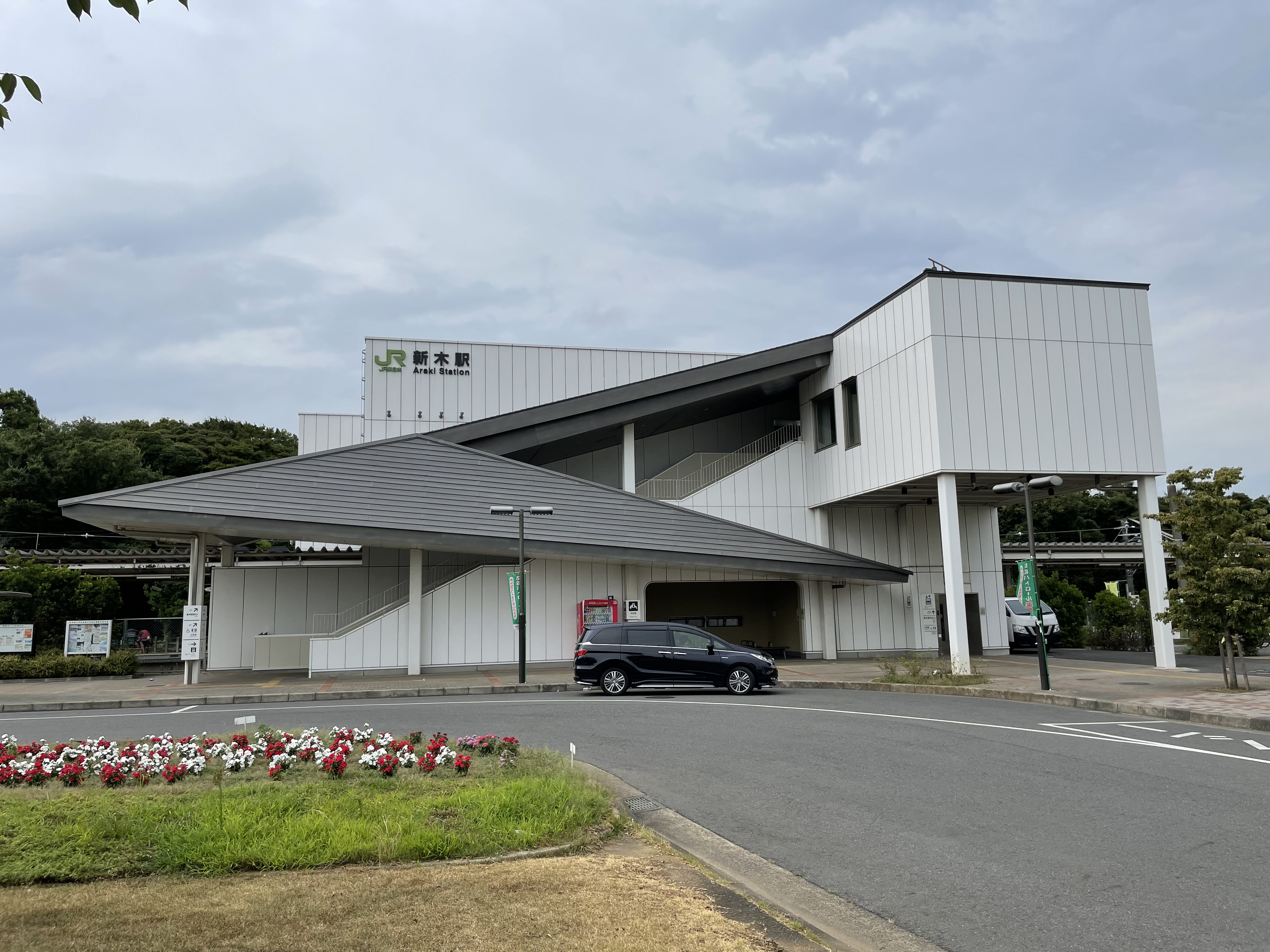
- Araki Station south entrance in July, 2022

General information
- Location: Araki, Abiko-shi, Chiba-ken 270-1112; Japan
- Coordinates: 35°51′41.51″N 140°06′24.91″E
- Operator: JR East
- Line: ■ Narita Line
- Distance: 8.9 from Abiko
- Platforms: 1 island platform
- Tracks: 2

Other information
- Status: Staffed
- Website: Official website

History
- Opened: 1 April 1958

Passengers
- FY2019: 2871 daily

Services
Preceding station	JR East	Following station
Kohoku towards Abiko	Narita Line Abiko branch	Fusa towards Narita
Location
- Location within Chiba Prefecture Location within Japan

Araki Station (新木駅, Araki-eki) is a passenger railway station in the city of Abiko, Chiba Prefecture, Japan, operated by East Japan Railway Company (JR East).

== Lines ==
Araki Station is served by the 32.9 km Abiko Branch Line of the Narita Line, and lies 8.9 kilometers from the terminus of the line at Abiko Station.

== Layout ==
The station consists of a single island platform serving two tracks. The elevated station building is built on a cantilever above and across the platform. The station is staffed.

=== Platforms ===
1	■ Narita Line	for Narita, Abiko, and Ueno
2	■ Narita Line	for Abiko and Ueno

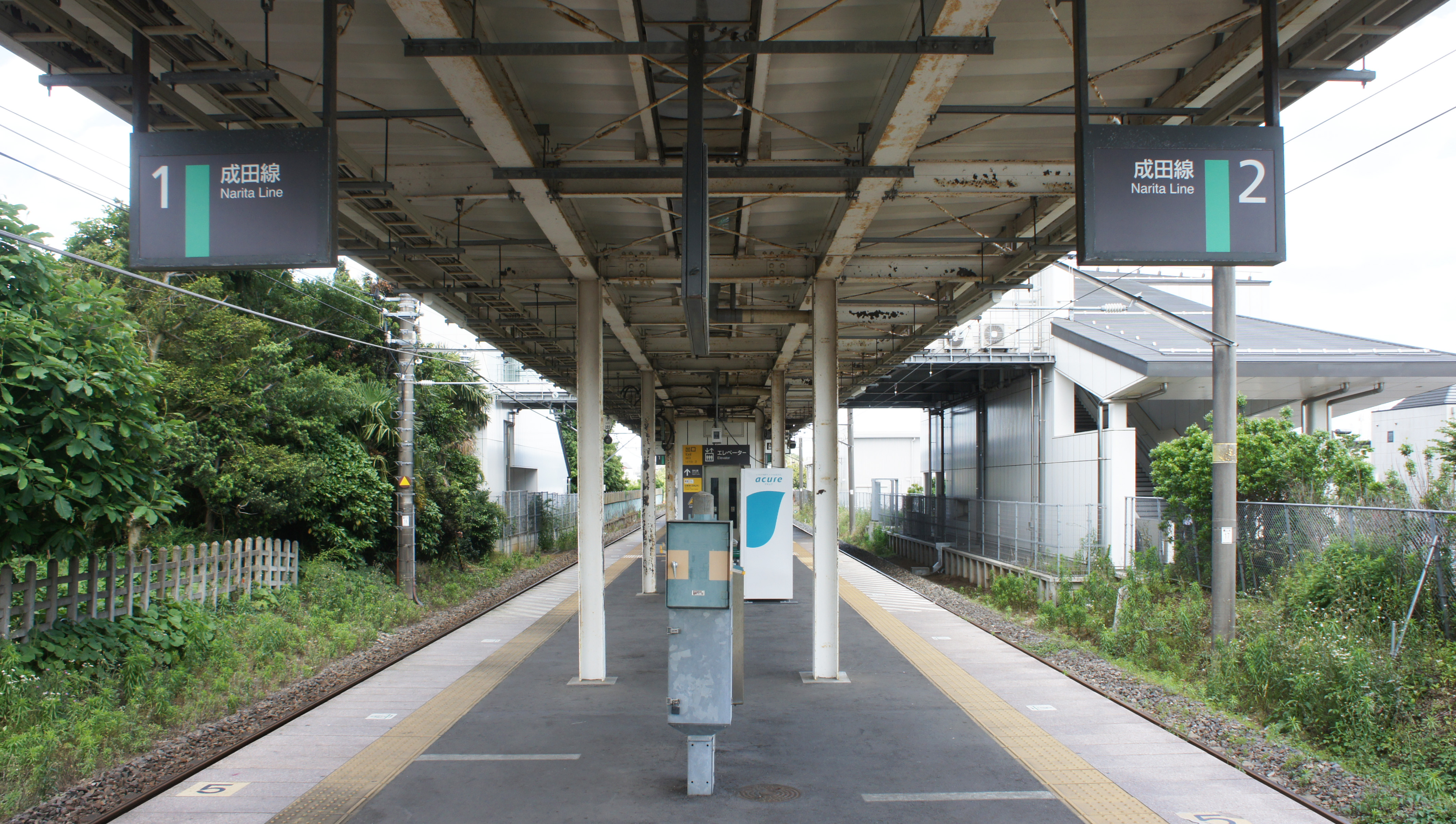
Platform in May, 2021

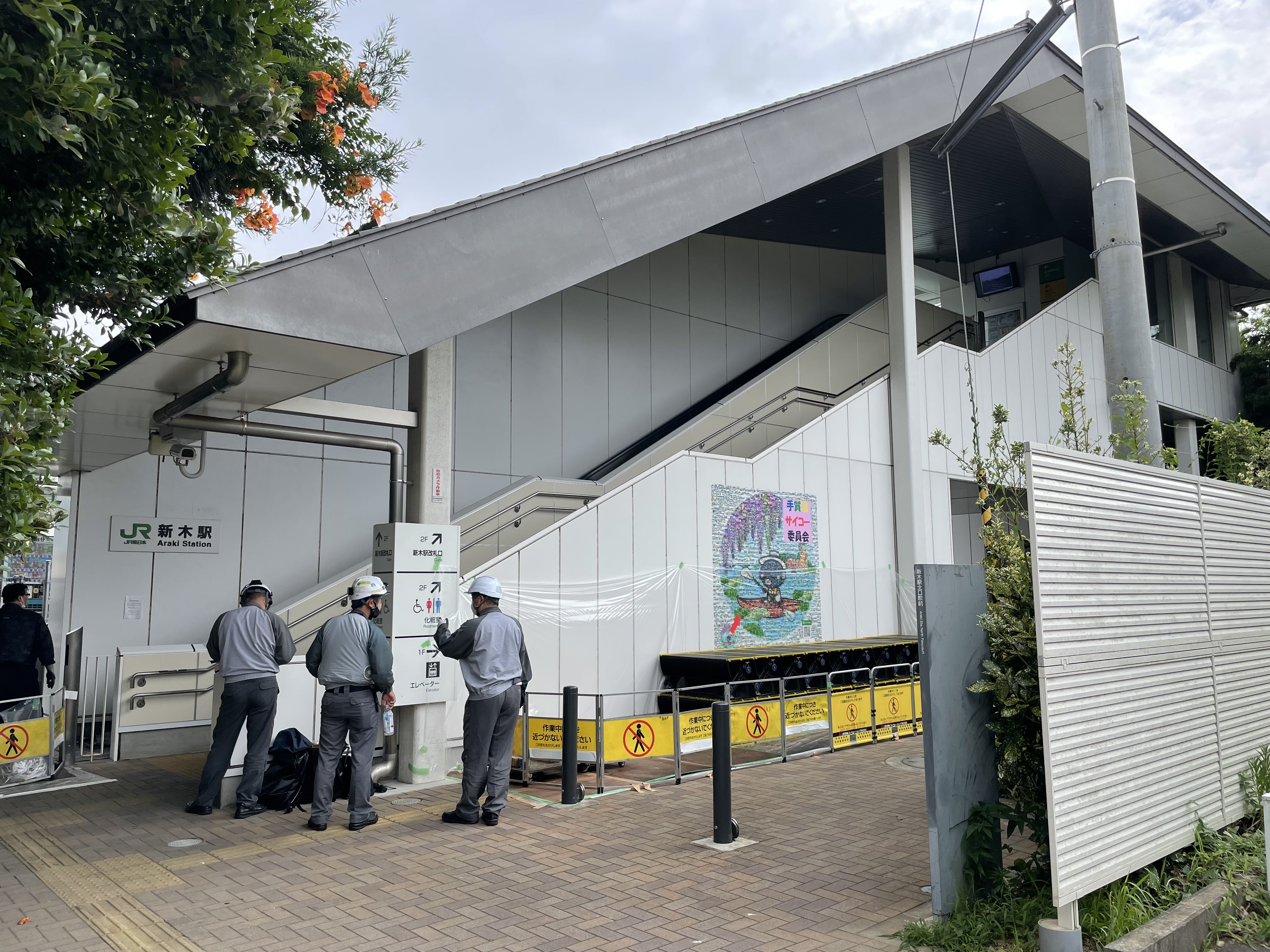
North Exit in July, 2022

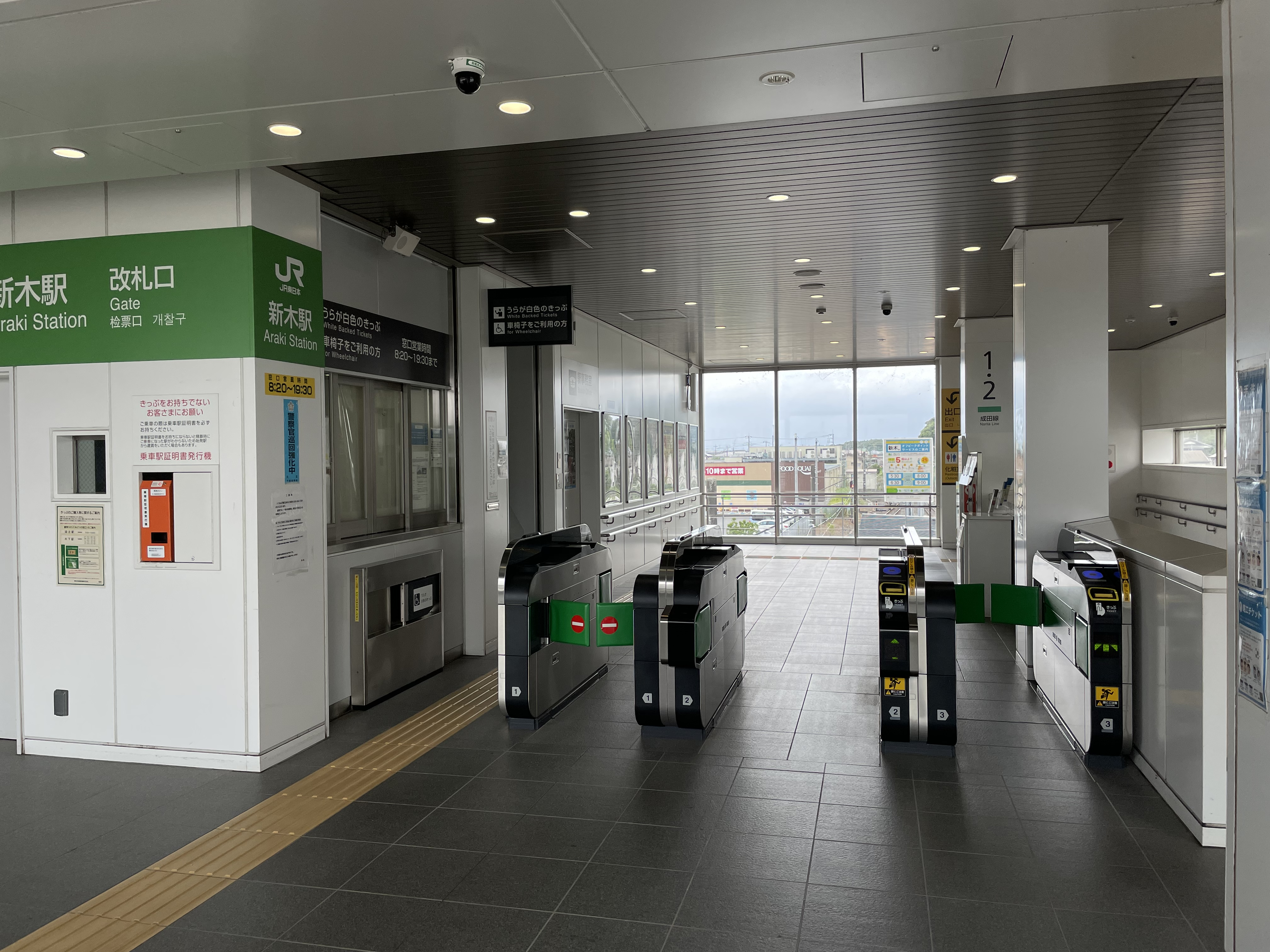
Ticket Gates in July, 2022

== History ==
Araki Station opened on April 1, 1958. The station was absorbed into the JR East network upon the privatization of Japanese National Railways (JNR) on April 1, 1987.

== Passenger statistics ==
In fiscal 2019, the station was used by an average of 2871 passengers daily.

== Surrounding area ==
- National Route 356
- Fusa Minami Elementary School

== See also ==
- List of railway stations in Japan
