= Ajiki Station =

Railway station in Sakae, Chiba Prefecture, Japan

Ajiki Station 安食駅
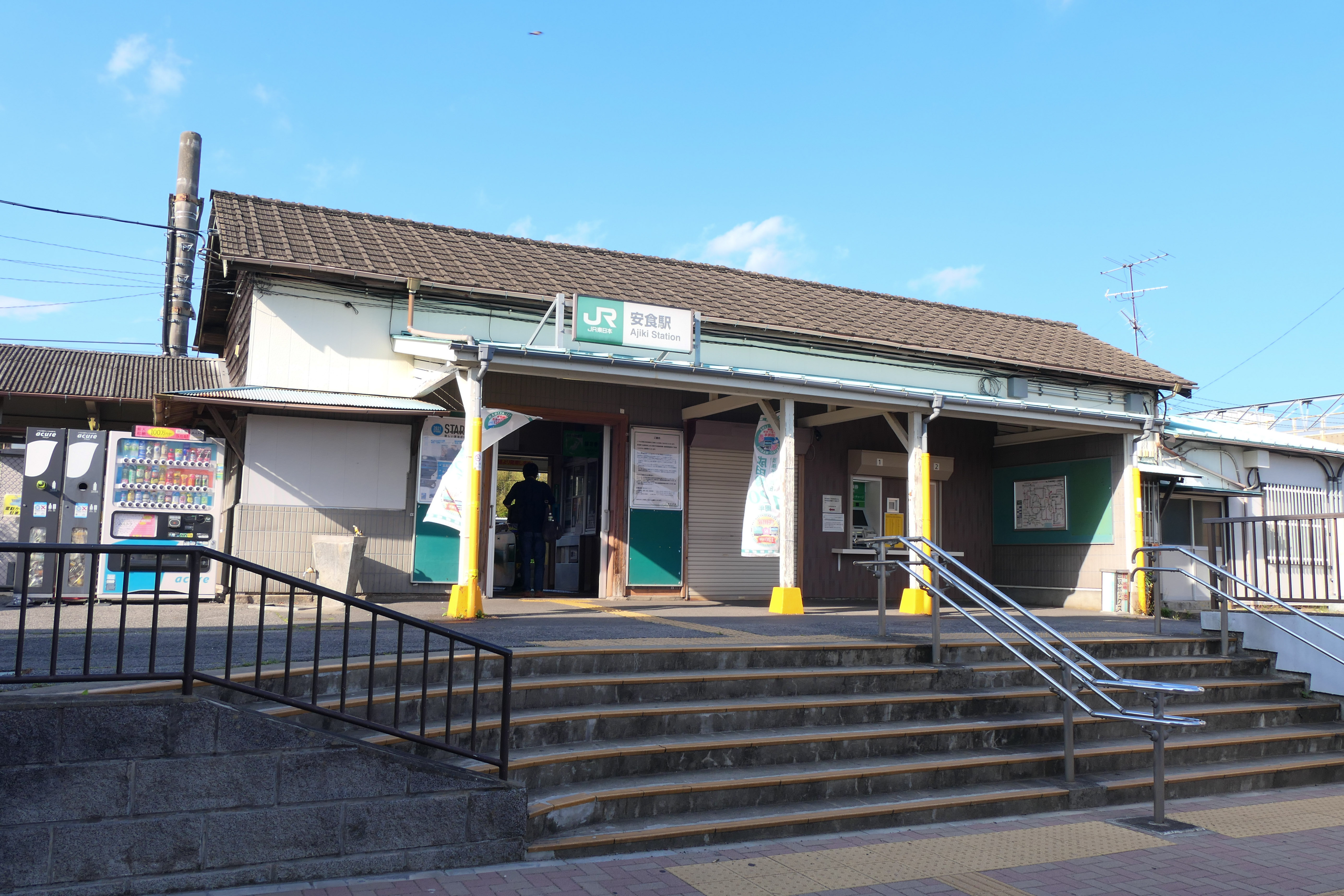
- Ajiki Station, 2021

General information
- Location: 3461 Ajiki, Sakae-machi, Inba-gun, Chiba-ken 270-1516; Japan
- Coordinates: 35.8359°N 140.2421°E
- Operator: JR East
- Line: ■ Narita Line
- Distance: 23.2 from Abiko
- Platforms: 2 side platforms
- Tracks: 2

Other information
- Status: Staffed ( Midori no Madoguchi )
- Website: Official website

History
- Opened: February 2, 1901

Passengers
- FY2019: 2427 daily

Services
Preceding station	JR East	Following station
Kobayashi towards Abiko	Narita Line Abiko branch	Shimōsa-Manzaki towards Narita
Location
- Location within Chiba Prefecture Location within Japan

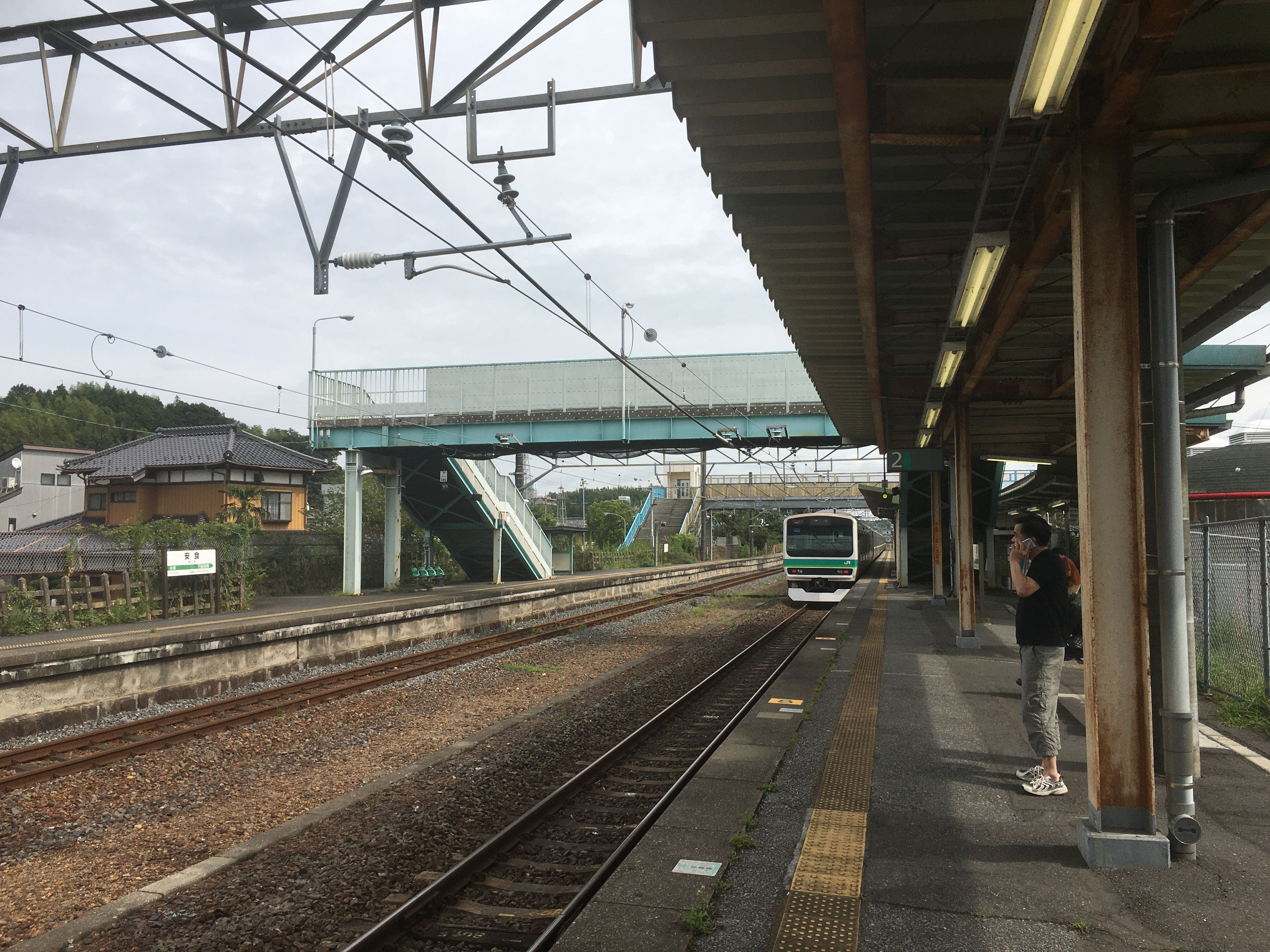
Station platforms, 2020

Ajiki Station (安食駅, Ajiki-eki) is a passenger railway station in the town of Sakae, Chiba Prefecture, Japan, operated by East Japan Railway Company (JR East).

It serves the town of Sakae, where you can find tourist attractions like Boso no mura and Owashi Shrine.

== Lines ==
Ajiki Station is served by the Abiko Branch Line of the Narita Line, and lies 23.2 kilometers from the terminus of the line at Abiko Station.

== Station layout ==
The station consists of dual opposed side platforms connected by a footbridge. The station has a Midori no Madoguchi staffed ticket office.

=== Platforms ===
1	■ Narita Line	For Narita
2	■ Narita Line	For Abiko, Ueno

== History ==
Ajiki Station was opened on February 2, 1901, as a station on the Narita Railway Company for both freight and passenger operations. On September 1, 1920, the Narita Railway was nationalised, becoming part of the Japanese Government Railway (JGR). After World War II, the JGR became the Japan National Railways (JNR). Scheduled freight operations were suspended from June 10, 1970. The station was absorbed into the JR East network upon the privatization of the Japan National Railways (JNR) on April 1, 1987.

== Passenger statistics ==
In fiscal 2019, the station was used by an average of 2427 passengers daily.

== Surrounding area ==
- National Route 356
- Sakae Town Hall

== See also ==
- List of railway stations in Japan
