= Higashi-Abiko Station =

Railway station in Abiko, Chiba Prefecture, Japan

Higashi-Abiko Station 東我孫子駅
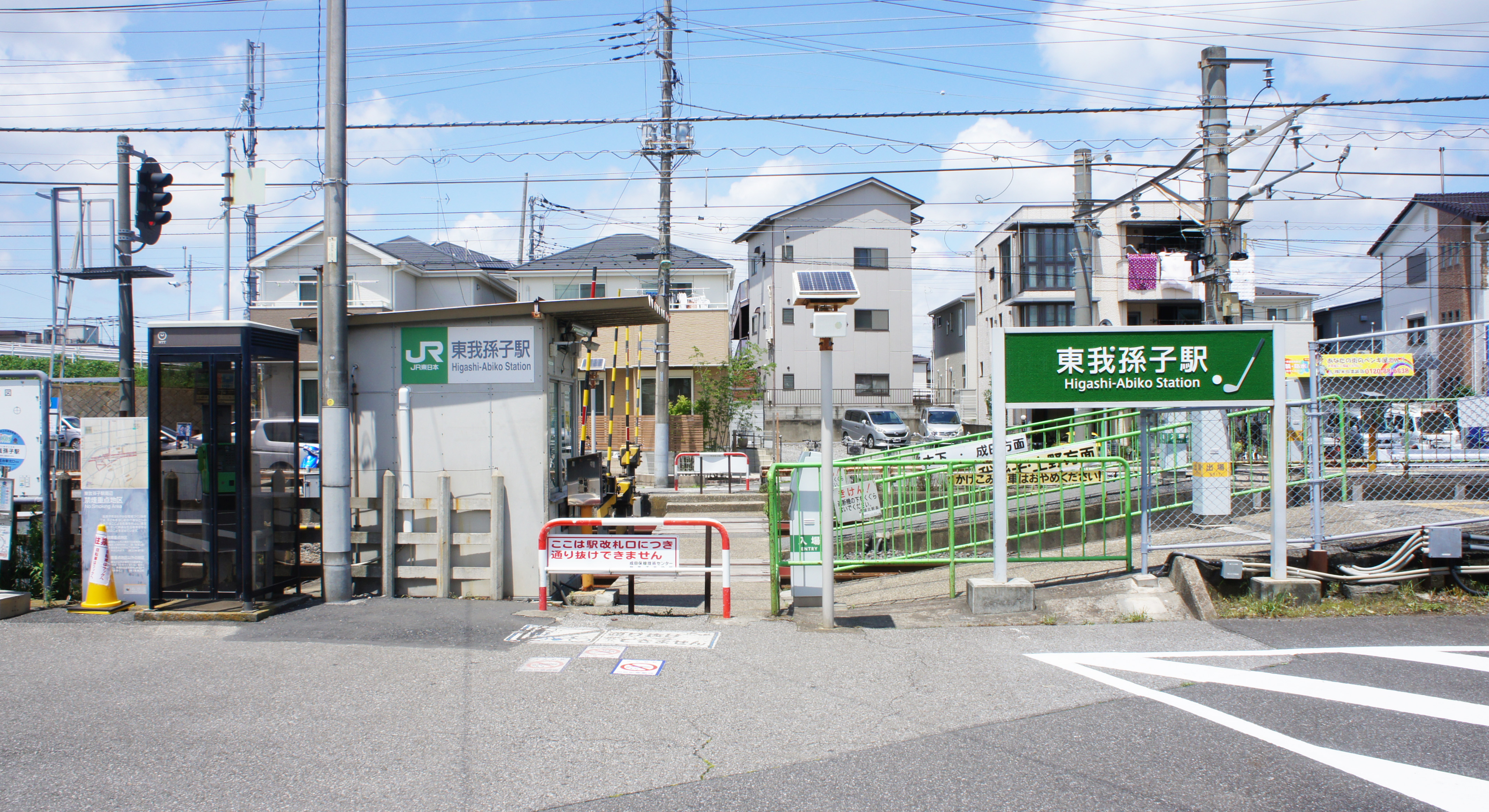
- Higashi-Abiko Station in May 2021

General information
- Location: Sageto, Abiko-shi, Chiba-ken 270-1138; Japan
- Coordinates: 35.8688°N 140.0479°E
- Operator: JR East
- Line: ■ Narita Line
- Distance: 3.4 km from Abiko
- Platforms: 2 side platforms
- Tracks: 2

Other information
- Status: Unstaffed
- Website: Official website

History
- Opened: October 12, 1950

Passengers
- 2006: 729 daily

Services
| Preceding station | JR East | Following station |
|---|---|---|
| Abiko JJ08 Terminus | Narita Line Abiko branch | Kohoku towards Narita |
Location
- Location within Chiba Prefecture Location within Japan

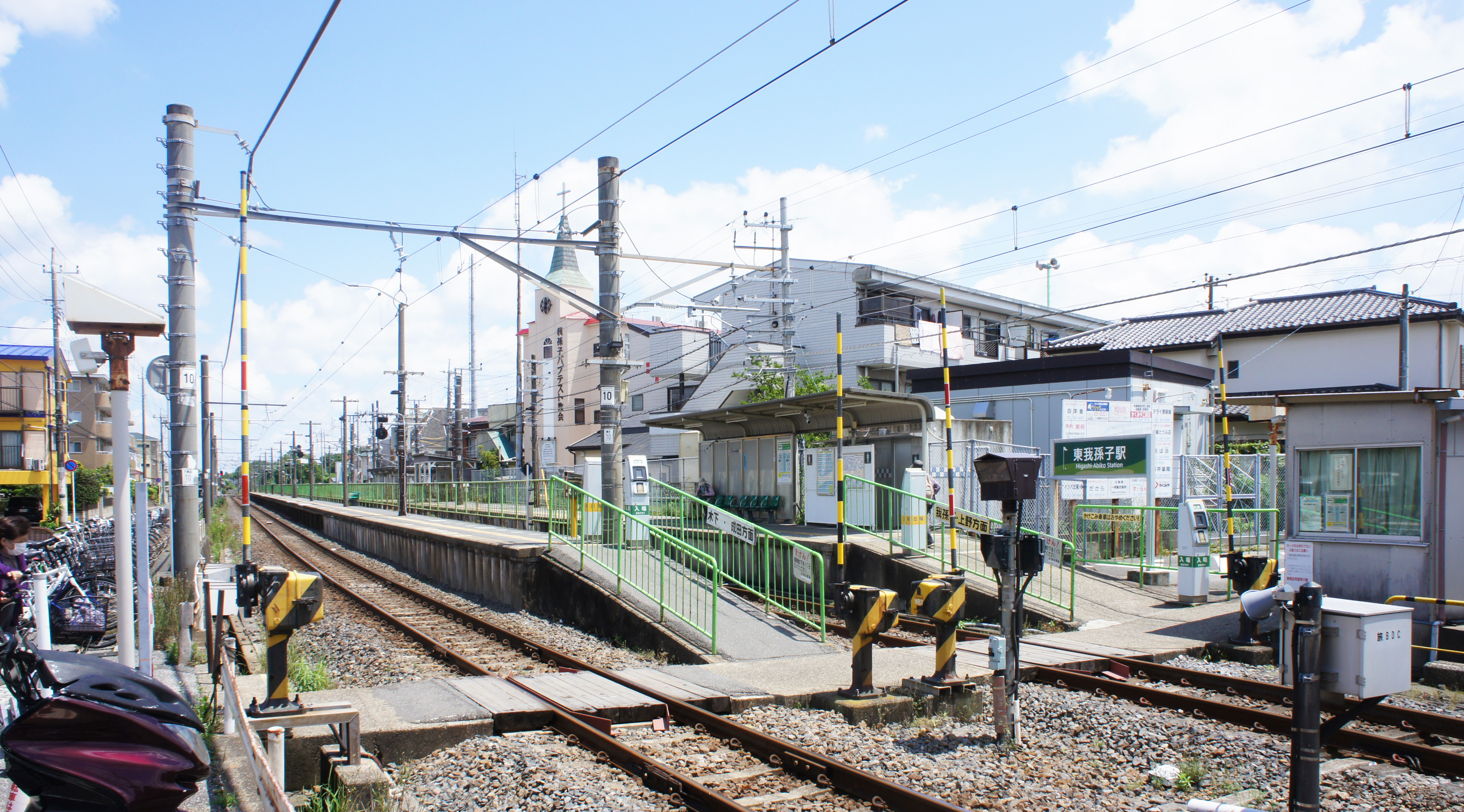
Platform in May 2021

Higashi-Abiko Station (東我孫子駅, Higashi-Abiko-eki) is a passenger railway station in the city of Abiko, Chiba Prefecture Japan, operated by the East Japan Railway Company (JR East).

== Lines ==
Higashi-Abiko Station is served by the Abiko Branch Line of the Narita Line. Positioned 3.4 kilometers from the branch line's terminus at Abiko Station, it provides convenient access for passengers traveling within the region and to nearby areas. The Narita Line, one of the key railways in Chiba Prefecture, connects passengers to various destinations, facilitating regional travel and commuting.

== Station layout ==
Higashi-Abiko Station has two parallel side platforms connected by a level crossing. There is no station building, and the station is unattended.

=== Platforms ===
| 1 | ■ Narita Line | For Narita |
| 2 | ■ Narita Line | For Abiko, Ueno |

== History ==
Higashi-Abiko Station was opened on October 12, 1950 as a station on the Japan National Railways (JNR). The station was absorbed into the JR East network upon the privatization of the JNR on April 1, 1987.

== Passenger statistics ==
In fiscal 2006, the station was used by an average of 729 passengers daily.

== Surrounding area ==
- National Route 356
- Abiko Middle School
- Abiko Post Office

== See also ==
- List of railway stations in Japan
