= Kohoku Station =

Railway station in Abiko, Chiba Prefecture, Japan

Kohoku Station 湖北駅
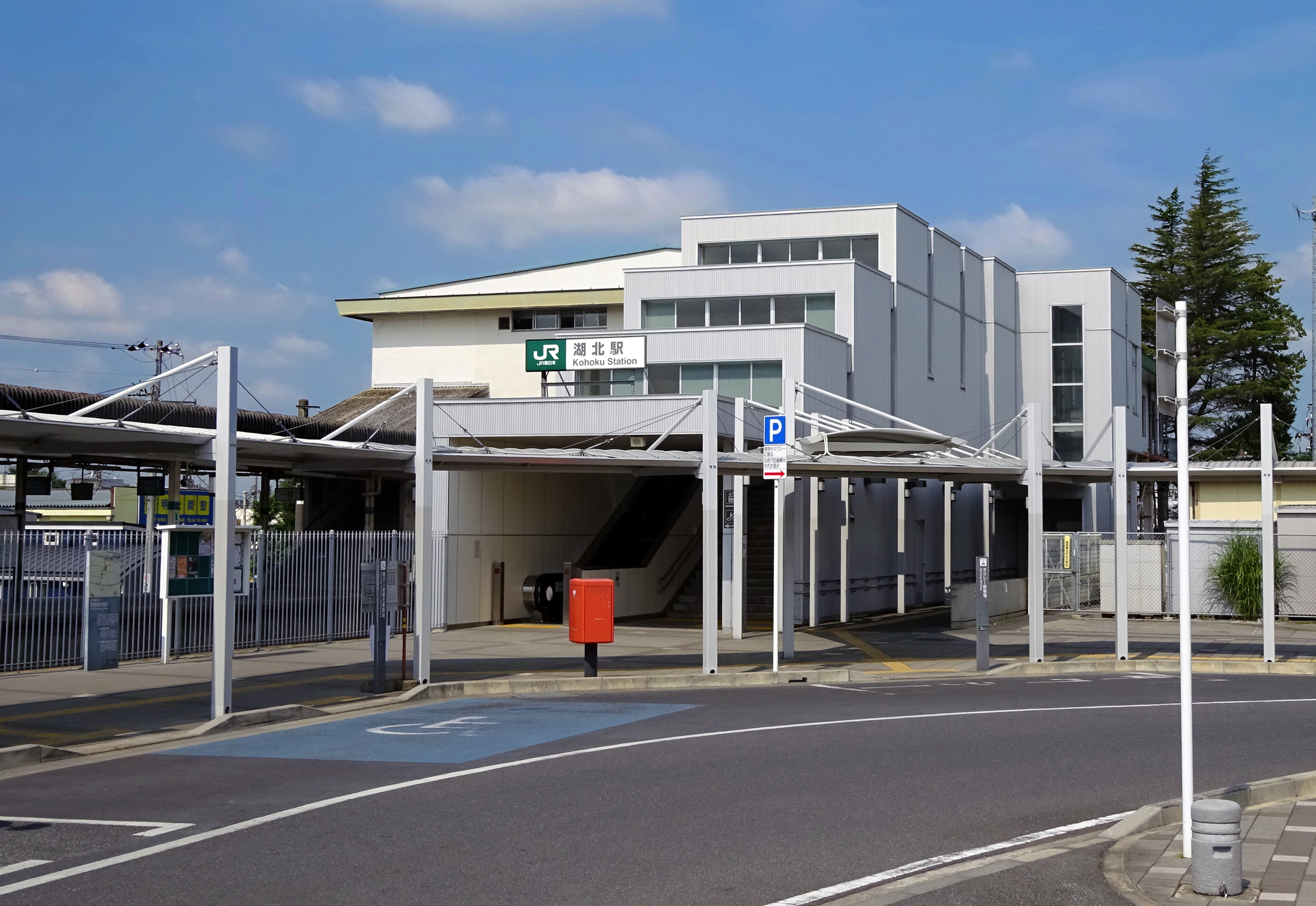
- Kohoku Station north exit in July 2018

General information
- Location: Nakazato 324, Abiko-shi, Chiba-ken 270-1122; Japan
- Coordinates: 35.8673°N 140.0779°E
- Operator: JR East
- Line: ■ Narita Line
- Distance: 6.3 km from Abiko
- Platforms: 1 island platform

Other information
- Status: Staffed (Midori no Madoguchi )
- Website: Official website

History
- Opened: April 1, 1901

Passengers
- 2019: 3987 daily

Services
Preceding station	JR East	Following station
Higashi-Abiko towards Abiko	Narita Line Abiko branch	Araki towards Narita
Location
- Location within Chiba Prefecture Location within Japan

Kohoku Station (湖北駅, Kohoku-eki) is a passenger railway station in the city of Abiko, Chiba Prefecture Japan, operated by the East Japan Railway Company (JR East).

== Lines ==
Kohoku Station is served by the Abiko Branch Line of the Narita Line, and is located 6.3 kilometers from the terminus of branch line at Abiko Station.

== Station layout ==
Kohoku Station is an elevated station with a single island platform. The station building is built on a cantilever above and across the platform. The station has a Midori no Madoguchi staffed ticket office.

=== Platforms ===
1	■ Narita Line	For Narita
2	■ Narita Line	For Abiko, Ueno

== History ==
Kohoku Station was opened on April 1, 1901 as a station on the Narita Railway Company. On September 1, 1920, the Narita Railway was nationalised, becoming part of the Japanese Government Railways (JGR). After World War II, the JGR became the Japanese National Railways (JNR). Scheduled freight operations were suspended from November 1, 1962. The station was absorbed into the JR East network upon the privatization of the Japanese National Railways on April 1, 1987. The station building was extensively rebuilt and modernized in 2007.

== Passenger statistics ==
In fiscal 2019, the station was used by an average of 3987 passengers daily.

== Surrounding area ==
- National Route 356
- Kohoku Housing District

== See also ==
- List of railway stations in Japan
