= Araki Station =

Araki Station may refer to:

- Araki Station (Fukuoka)
- Araki Station (Chiba)
