= Sakae, Chiba =

Sakae 栄町
- Town
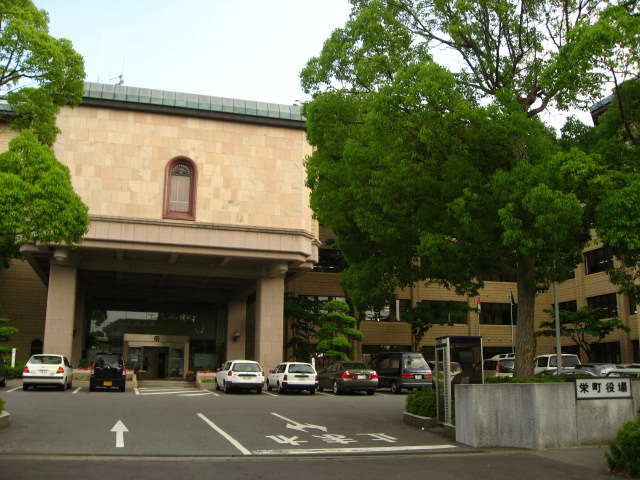
- Sakae Town Office

- Flag Seal

- Location of Sakae in Chiba Prefecture

- Coordinates: 35°50′N 140°15′E
- Country: Japan
- Region: Kantō
- Prefecture: Chiba
- District: Inba

Area
  - Total: 32.46 km^{2} (12.53 sq mi)

Population (December 2020)
  - Total: 20,325
  - Density: 626.2/km^{2} (1,622/sq mi)
- Time zone: UTC+9 (Japan Standard Time)
- Tree: Camellia sasanqua
- Flower: Gentiana scabra
- Phone number: 0476-95-1111
- Address: 1-2 Ajikidai Inba-gun, Sakae-machi, Chiba-ken 270-1592
- Website: Official website

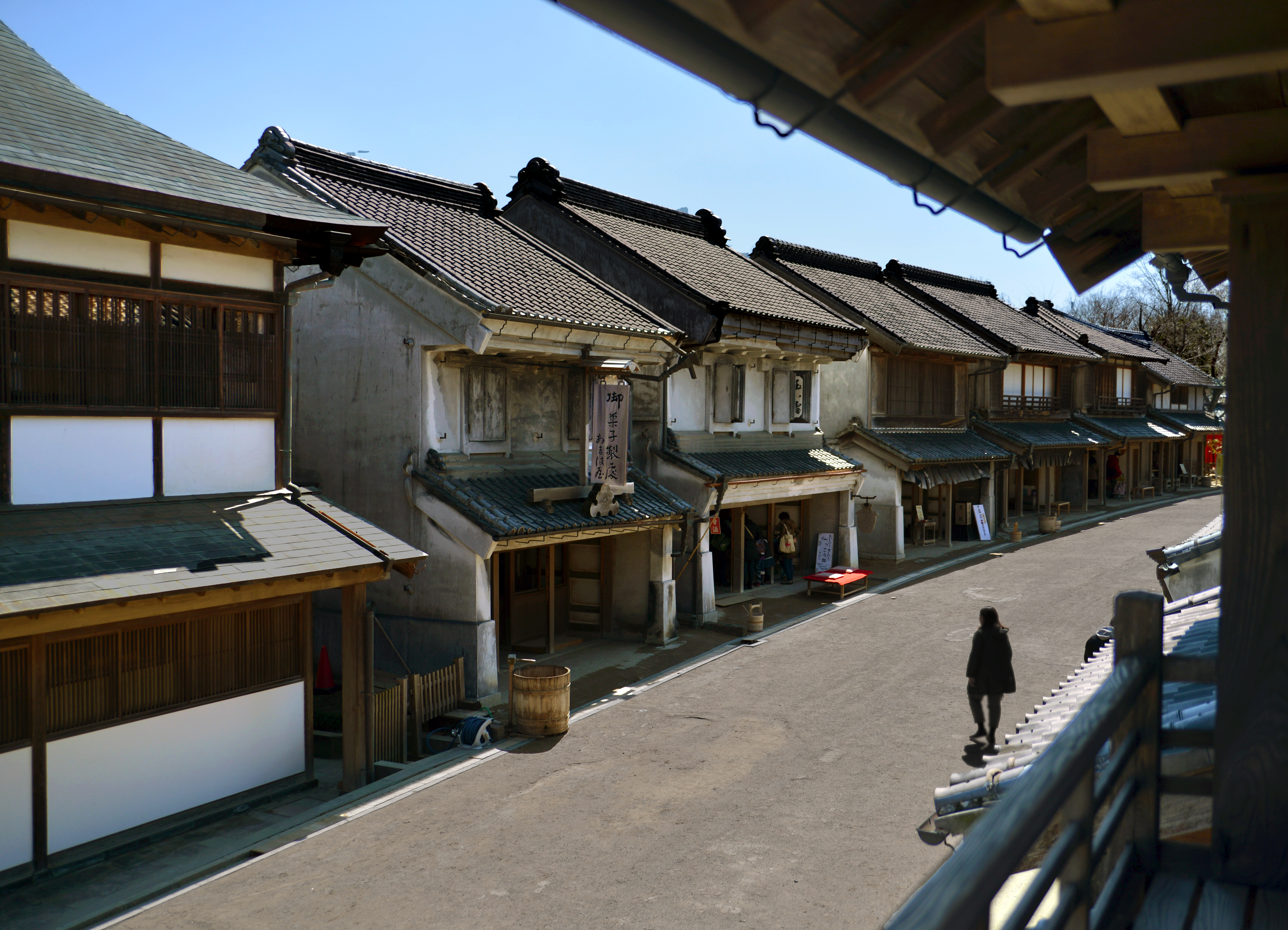
Chiba Prefectural Boso no Mura museum (townscape of merchant houses)

Sakae (栄町, Sakae-machi) is a town located in Chiba Prefecture, Japan. As of 1 December 2020, the town had an estimated population of 20,325 in 9138 households and a population density of 630 persons per km². The total area of the town is 32.46 square kilometres (12.53 sq mi).

== Geography ==
Sakae is located in the northern center of Chiba prefecture, about 30 kilometers from the prefectural capital at Chiba, and about 45 to 55 kilometers from the center of Tokyo. The town is within the Kanto Plain, and the northwestern and southern parts of the town are flat with paddy fields. The eastern plateau is on the Shimōsa Plateau, with many forests and fields. The Tone River flows to the north of the town.

=== Neighboring municipalities ===
Chiba Prefecture

- Inzai
- Kawachi
- Narita
- Tone

=== Climate ===
Sakae has a humid subtropical climate (Köppen Cfa) characterized by warm summers and cool winters with light to no snowfall. The average annual temperature in Sakae is 14.6 °C. The average annual rainfall is 1382 mm with September as the wettest month. The temperatures are highest on average in August, at around 26.2 °C, and lowest in January, at around 4.1 °C.

== Demographics ==
Per Japanese census data, the population of Sakae more than doubled between 1980 and 1990 before peaking around the year 2000 and going into decline.

Historical population
Year	Pop.	±%
1950	10,162	—
1960	9,732	−4.2%
1970	8,825	−9.3%
1980	9,553	+8.2%
1990	22,493	+135.5%
2000	25,475	+13.3%
2010	22,580	−11.4%
2020	20,127	−10.9%

== History ==
Sakae village was founded on April 1, 1889 through the merger of seven small hamlets in Shimohabu District with the establishment of the modern municipalities system. On the same day, Fukama Village in Inba District was founded through the merger of 15 small hamlets. On December 28, 1892, Sakae Village was promoted to town status and renamed Ajiki Town. On April 1, 1897, Shimohabu District was abolished, and Ajiki Town became part of Inba District. On December 1, 1955, the town of Ajiki and the village of Fukama merged to form the new town of Sakae. In a border of adjustment on January 1, 1956, Sakae annexed a portion of neighboring Kawachi, Ibaraki to gain its current borders.

== Government ==
Sakae has a mayor-council form of government with a directly elected mayor and a unicameral town council of 14 members. Sakai, together with neighboring Inzai contributes two members to the Chiba Prefectural Assembly. In terms of national politics, the town is part of Chiba 13th district of the lower house of the Diet of Japan.

== Economy ==
Sakae is a regional commercial center with light manufacturing, primarily related to the food processing industries.

== Education ==
Sakae has four public elementary schools and one public middle school operated by the town government. The town does not have a high school.

== Transportation ==
=== Railway ===
JR East – Narita Line

- Ajiki

=== Highway ===
- National Route 356

== Local attractions ==
- Ryukaku-ji - Buddhist temple founded in the Nara period, containing numerous Kofun period burial mounds

== Notable people from Sakae ==
- Masafumi Togano, professional baseball player
