= Kioroshi Station =

Railway station in Inzai, Chiba Prefecture, Japan

Kioroshi Station 木下駅
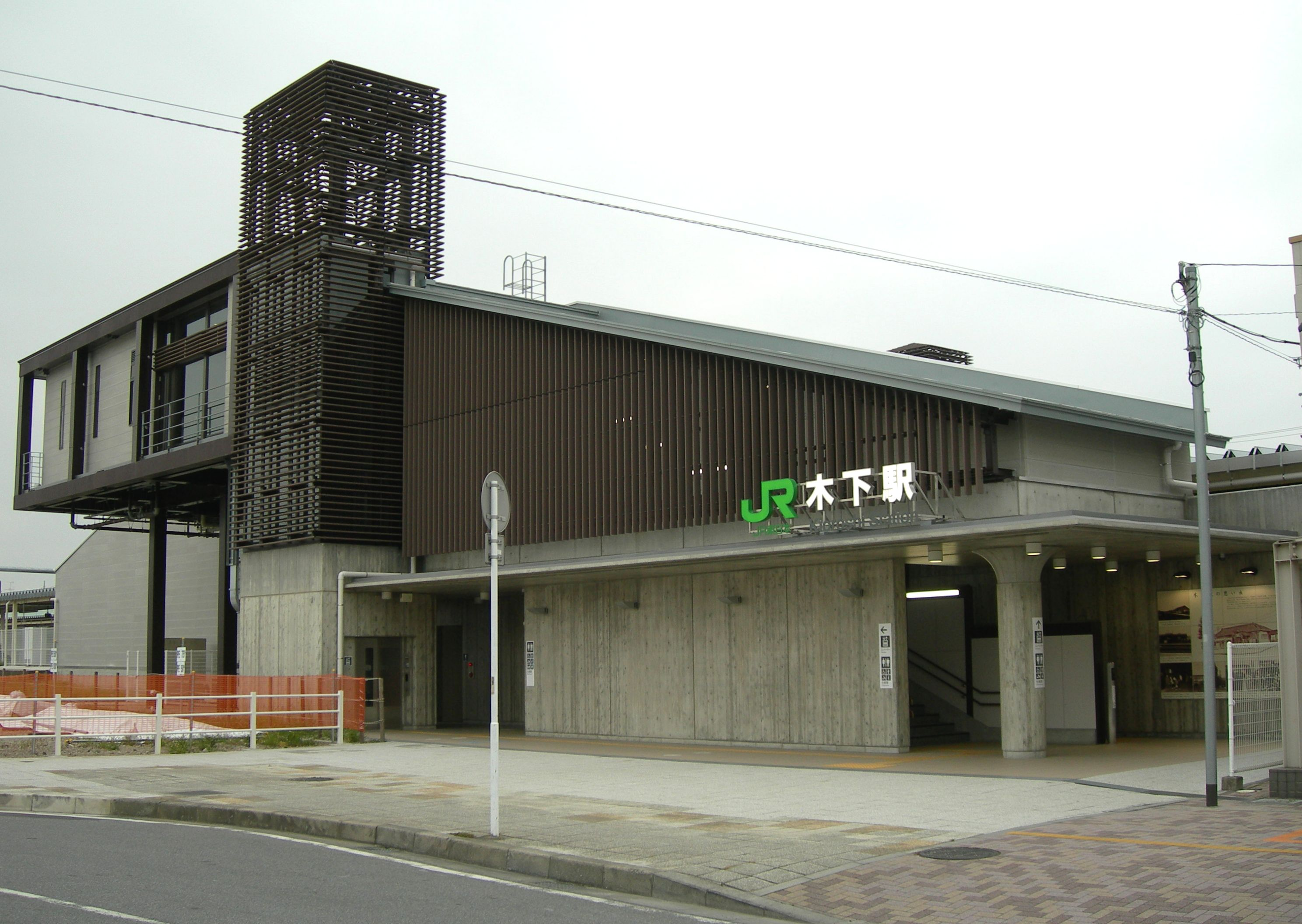
- Kioroshi Station south exit

General information
- Location: Kioroshi 1633, Inzai-shi, Chiba-ken 270-1326; Japan
- Coordinates: 35.8389°N 140.1479°E
- Operator: JR East
- Line: ■ Narita Line
- Distance: 14.0 km from Abiko
- Platforms: 2 side platforms

Other information
- Status: Staffed (Midori no Madoguchi)
- Website: Official website

History
- Opened: April 1, 1901

Passengers
- FY2019: 2059

Services
Preceding station	JR East	Following station
Fusa towards Abiko	Narita Line Abiko branch	Kobayashi towards Narita
Location
- Location within Chiba Prefecture Location within Japan

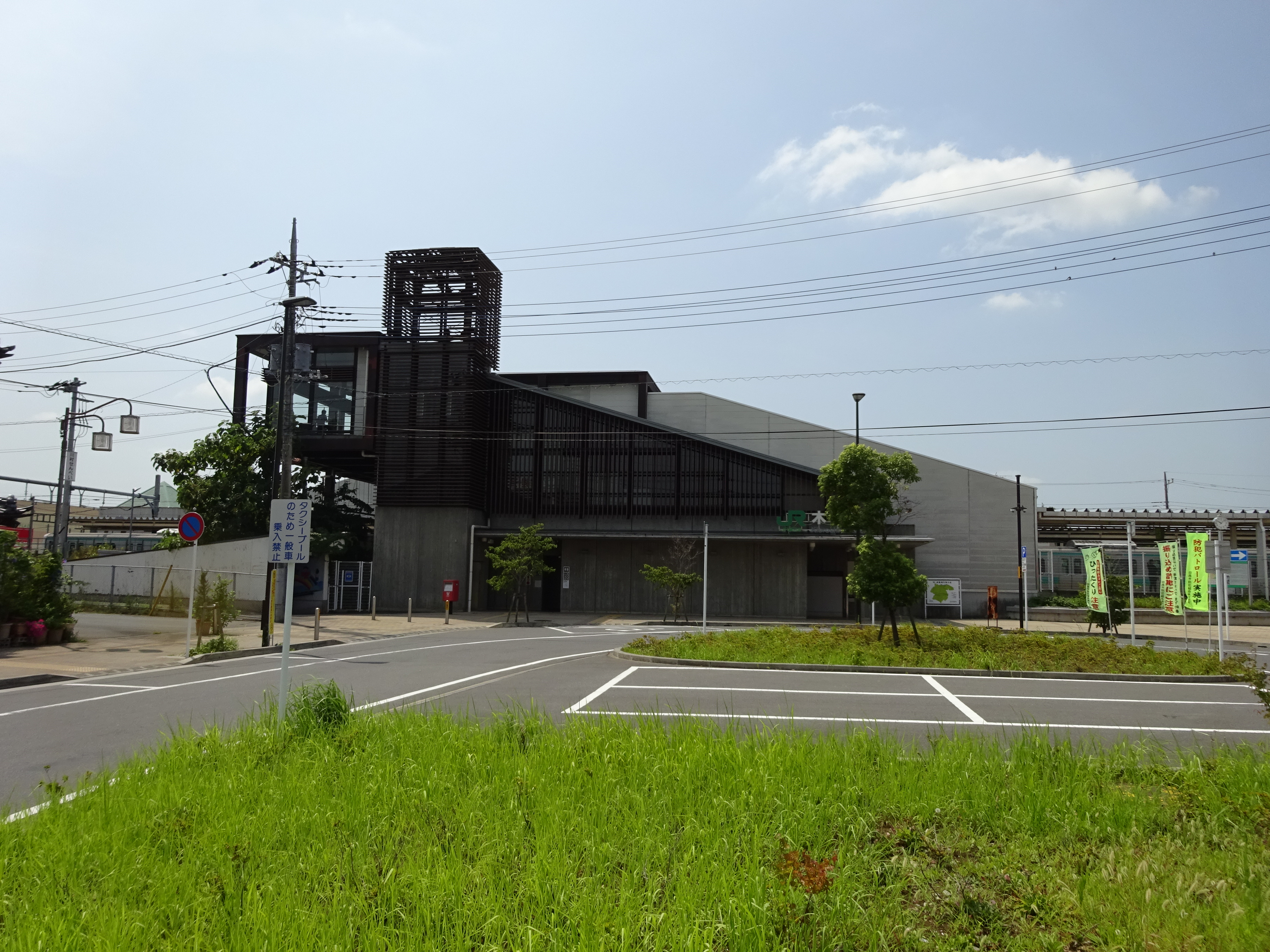
The north entrance in July 2018

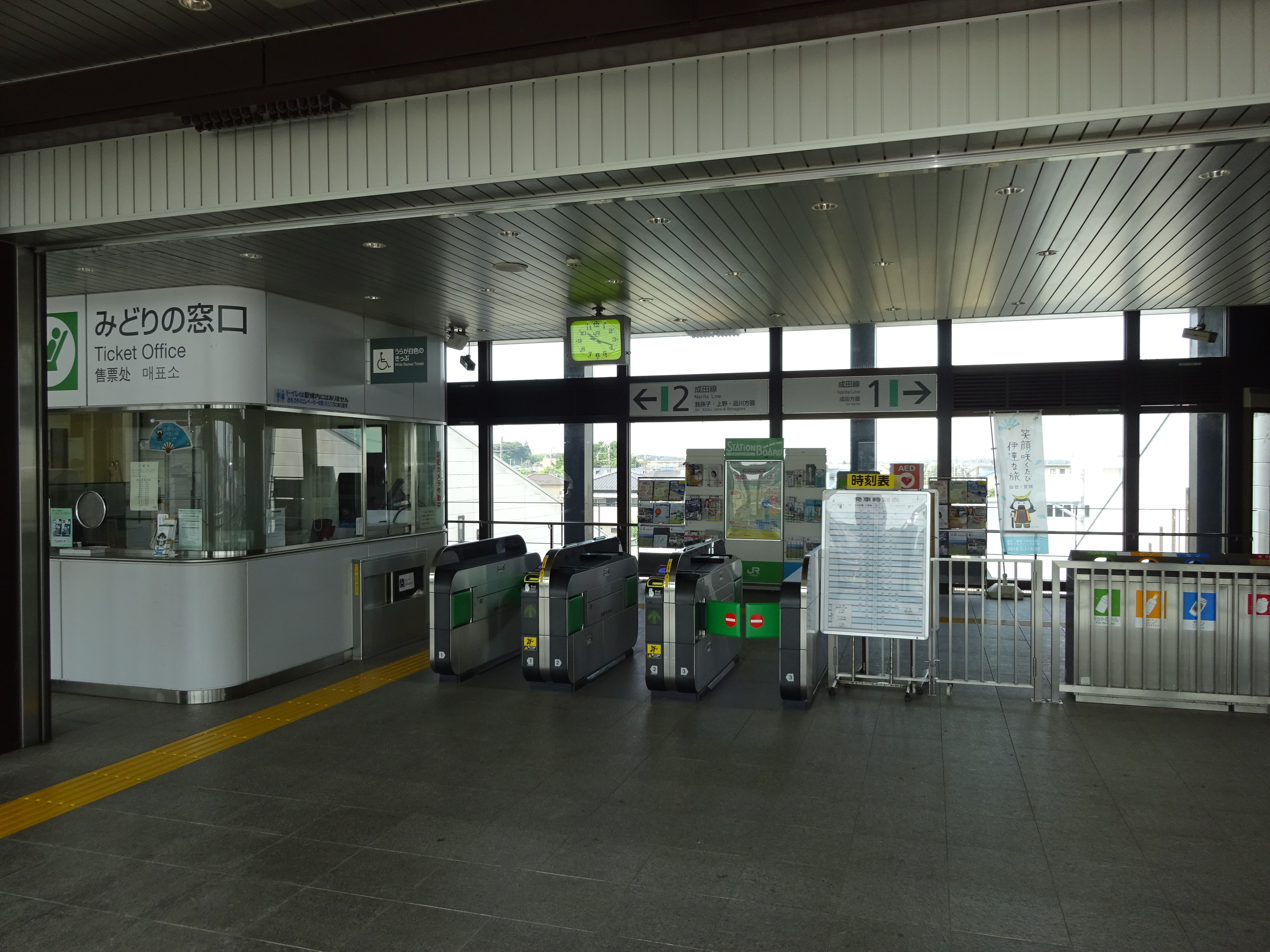
The ticket barriers in July 2018

Kioroshi Station (木下駅, Kioroshi-eki) is a passenger railway station located in the city of Inzai, Chiba Prefecture Japan, operated by the East Japan Railway Company (JR East).

== Lines ==
Kioroshi Station is served by the Abiko Branch Line of the Narita Line, and is located 14.0 kilometers from the terminus of the branch line at Abiko Station.

== Layout ==
Kioroshi Station is an elevated station with dual opposed side platforms. The station building is built on a cantilever above and across the platform. The station has a Midori no Madoguchi staffed ticket office.

=== Platforms ===
1	■ Narita Line	For Narita
2	■ Narita Line	For Abiko, Ueno

== History ==
Kioroshi Station was opened on April 1, 1901, as a station on the Narita Railway Company for both freight and passenger operations. On September 1, 1920, the Narita Railway was nationalised, becoming part of the Japanese Government Railway (JGR). After World War II, the JGR became the Japan National Railways (JNR). Scheduled freight operations were suspended from October 1, 1974. The station was absorbed into the JR East network upon the privatization of the Japan National Railways (JNR) on April 1, 1987. The station building was rebuilt from 2007 to 2008.

== Passenger statistics ==
In fiscal 2019, the station was used by an average of 2,059 passengers daily (boarding passengers only).

== Surrounding area ==
- Inzai City Hall
- Inzai General Hospital

== See also ==
- List of railway stations in Japan
