= Shimōsa-Manzaki Station =

Railway station in Narita, Chiba Prefecture, Japan

Shimōsa-Manzaki Station 下総松崎駅
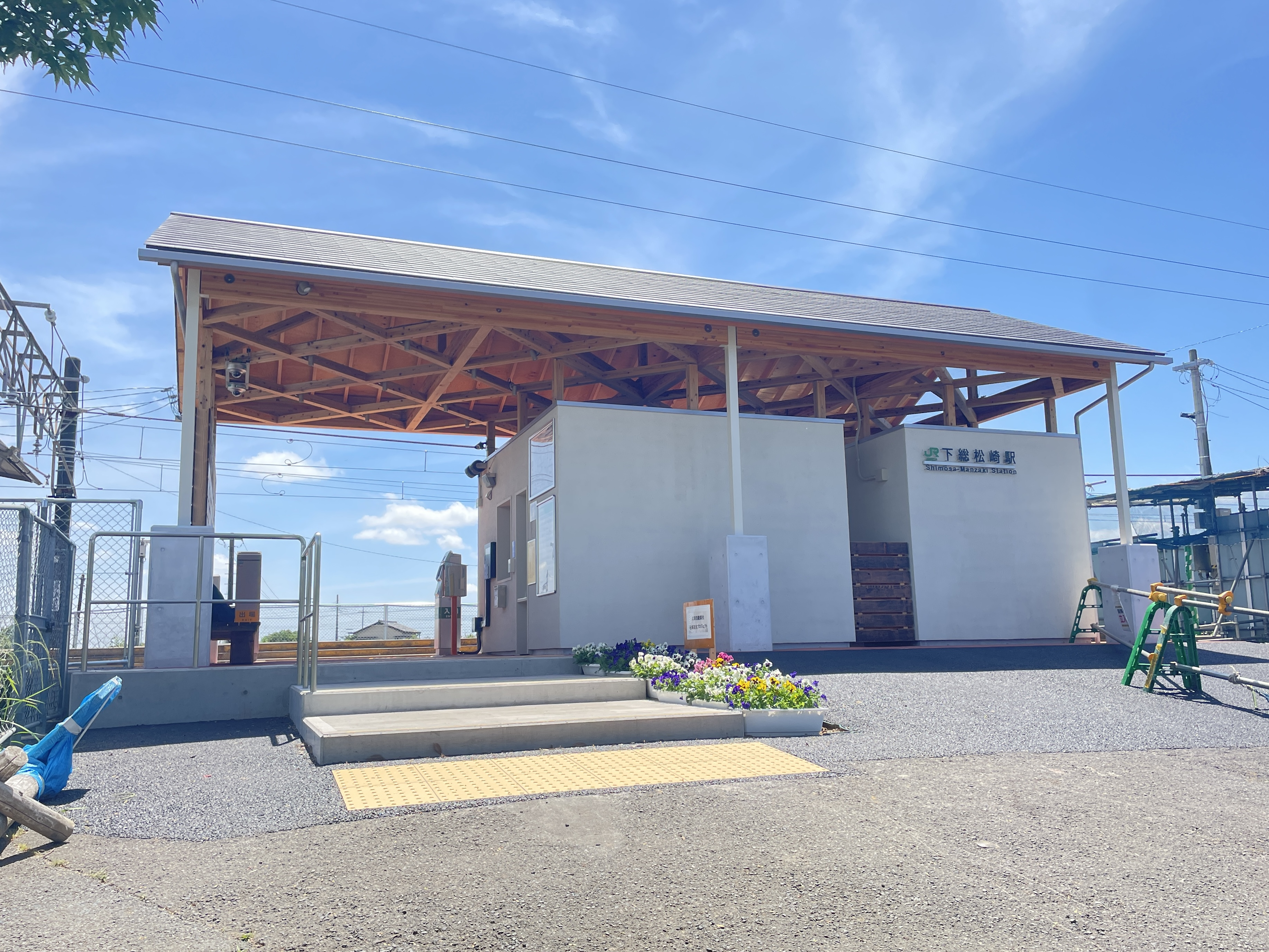
- Station building in May, 2025

General information
- Location: 340 Odake, Narita-shi, Chiba-ken 286-0841; Japan
- Coordinates: 35.8080°N 140.2776°E
- Operator: JR East
- Line: ■ Narita Line
- Distance: 27.3 km from Abiko.
- Platforms: 2 side platforms

Other information
- Status: Unstaffed
- Website: Official website

History
- Opened: August 10, 1901

Passengers
- FY2019: 710

Services
Preceding station	JR East	Following station
Ajiki towards Abiko	Narita Line Abiko branch	Narita JO35 Terminus
Location
- Location within Chiba Prefecture Location within Japan

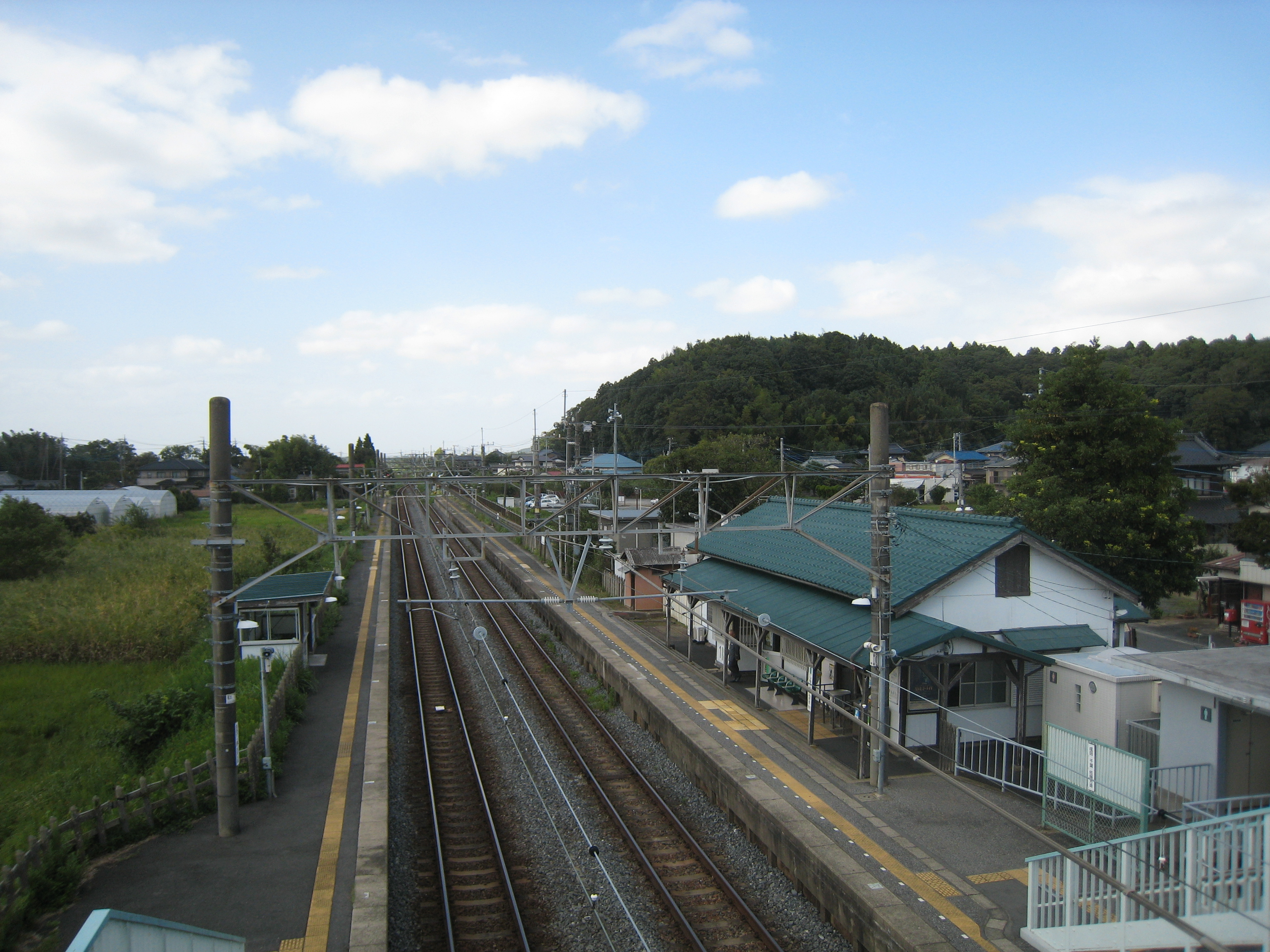
View of Shimōsa-Manzaki Station side platforms from the footbridge

Shimōsa-Manzaki Station (下総松崎駅, Shimōsa Manzaki-eki) is a passenger railway station in the city of Narita, Chiba, Japan, operated by the East Japan Railway Company (JR East).

== Lines ==
Shimōsa-Manzaki Station is served by the Abiko Branch Line of the Narita Line, and is located 27.3 km from the starting point of the Abiko Branch line at Abiko.

== Station layout ==
Shimōsa-Manzaki Station has two opposed side platforms connected by a footbridge. The station building is a wooden, single-story structure. The station is unstaffed, with staff available by intercom.

=== Platforms ===
1	■ Narita Line	for Narita
2	■ Narita Line	for Abiko and Ueno

== History ==
Shimōsa-Manzaki Station opened on August 10, 1901 as a station of the Narita Railway Company for both freight and passenger operations. On September 1, 1920, the Narita Railway was nationalised, becoming part of the Japanese Government Railway (JGR). After World War II, the JGR became the Japanese National Railways (JNR). The station was absorbed into the JR East network upon the privatization of JNR on April 1, 1987. The station building was repaired and modernized from 2006-2007.

== Passenger statistics ==
In fiscal 2019, the station was used by an average of 710 passengers daily (boarding passengers only).

== Surrounding area ==
- National Route 464
- Chiba Prefectural Narita Seiryo High School

== See also ==
- List of railway stations in Japan
