= Kawamura Gakuen Women's University =

Coordinates: 35°52′31.28″N 140°03′13.44″E

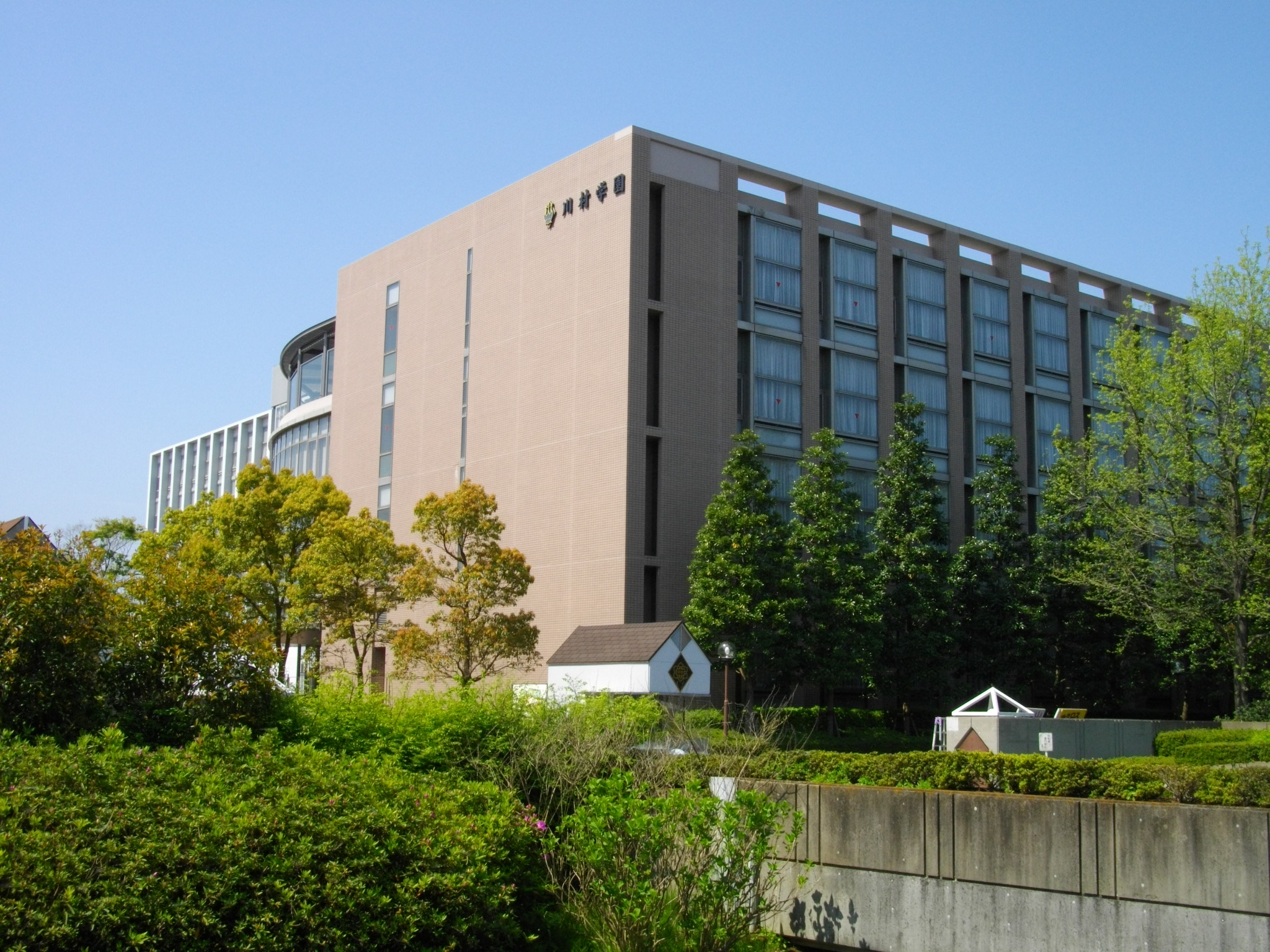
Kawamura Gakuen Women's University

Kawamura Gakuen Women's University (川村学園女子大学, Kawamura gakuen joshi daigaku), or KGWU, is a private university in Abiko, Chiba, Japan, established in 1988. The predecessor of the school was founded in 1924.

== Alumni ==
- Kyōko Hasegawa, an actress, fashion model
