= Tennōdai Station =

Railway station in Abiko, Chiba Prefecture, Japan

JJ09 JL31 Tennōdai Station 天王台駅
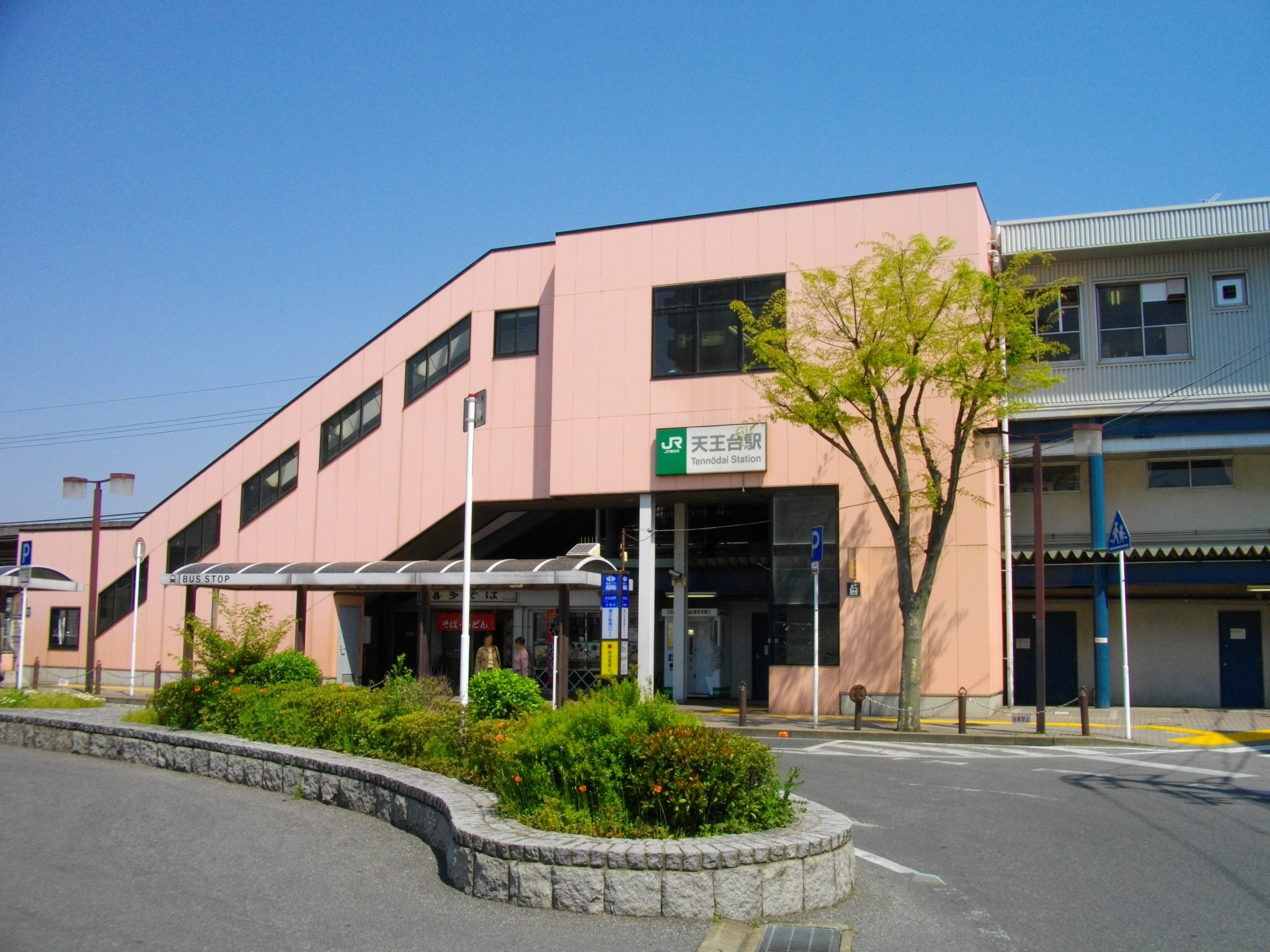
- South exit Tennōdai Station in May 2010

General information
- Location: 1-11-1 Shibazakidai, Abiko-shi, Chiba-ken 270-1176; Japan
- Coordinates: 35°52′20.9″N 140°2′28.1″E
- Operator: JR East
- Line: ■ Jōban Line
- Distance: 34.0 km from Nippori
- Platforms: 2 island platforms

Other information
- Status: Staffed
- Website: Official website

History
- Opened: April 20, 1971

Passengers
- 2019: 19,271 daily

Services
Preceding station	JR East	Following station
Abiko JJ08 towards Shinagawa	Jōban Line Local-Futsuu	Toride JJ10 towards Sendai
Abiko JJ08 towards Shinagawa	Jōban Line (Rapid) Rapid	Toride JJ10 Terminus
Abiko JL30 towards Ayase	Jōban Line (Local) Local-Kankō (limited service)	Toride JL32 (limited service) Terminus
Location
- Location within Chiba Prefecture Location within Japan

Tennōdai Station (天王台駅, Tennōdai-eki) is a passenger railway station in the city of Abiko, Chiba Prefecture Japan, operated by the East Japan Railway Company (JR East).

== Lines ==
Tennōdai Station is served by the Jōban Line, and is located 34.0 kilometers from the official starting point of the line at Nippori Station.

== Station layout ==
Tennōdai Station has two island platforms serving four tracks, connected by a footbridge. The station is staffed.

=== Platforms ===
1	Jōban Line (Rapid)	for Toride, Tsuchiura, Ishioka, Mito, and Takahagi
2	Jōban Line (Rapid)	for Abiko, Kashiwa, Matsudo, and Ueno; Ueno-Tokyo Line for Tokyo and Shinagawa
3	Jōban Line (Local)	for Toride
4	Jōban Line (Local)	for Abiko, Kashiwa, Matsudo and Ayase; Tokyo Metro Chiyoda Line for Kita-senju, Nishi-nippori and Yoyogi-uehara

== History ==
Tennōdai Station was opened on April 20, 1971 as a station on the Japan National Railways (JNR). The station was absorbed into the JR East network upon the privatization of the JNR on April 1, 1987.

== Passenger statistics ==
In fiscal 2019, the station was used by an average of 19,271 passengers daily.

== Surrounding area ==
- Chuo Gakuen High School

== See also ==
- List of railway stations in Japan
