= Abiko, Chiba =

Abiko 我孫子市
- City
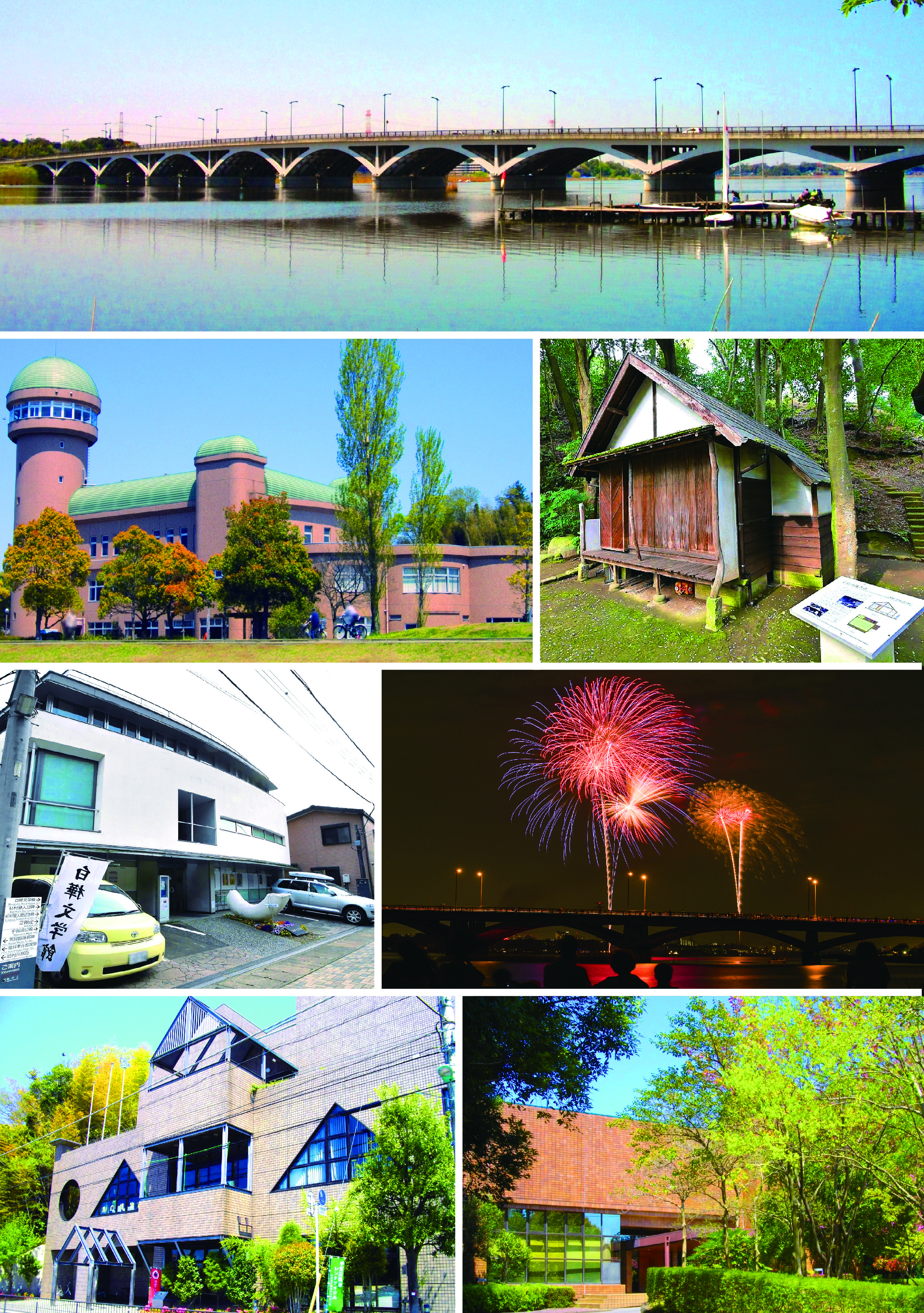
Teganuma and Tega Bridge
Teganuma Water Museum	Naoya Shiga villa
Shirakabaha Museum	Teganuma Fireworks
Abiko City Museum of Birds	Yamashina Institute for Ornithology
- Flag Seal

- Location of Abiko in Chiba Prefecture

- Coordinates: 35°52′N 140°02′E
- Country: Japan
- Region: Kantō
- Prefecture: Chiba

Government
  - Mayor: Junichiro Hoshino (since January 2007)

Area
  - Total: 43.19 km^{2} (16.68 sq mi)
- Elevation: 4 m (13 ft)

Population (February 2024)
  - Total: 131,183
  - Density: 3,037/km^{2} (7,867/sq mi)
- Time zone: UTC+9 (Japan Standard Time)
- Postal code: 270-1192
- Phone number: 04-7185-1111
- Address: 1858 Banchi, Abiko-shi, Chiba-ken 270-1192
- Climate: Cfa
- Website: Official website
- Symbols
- Bird: Eurasian coot
- Flower: Azalea
- Tree: Zelkova serrata

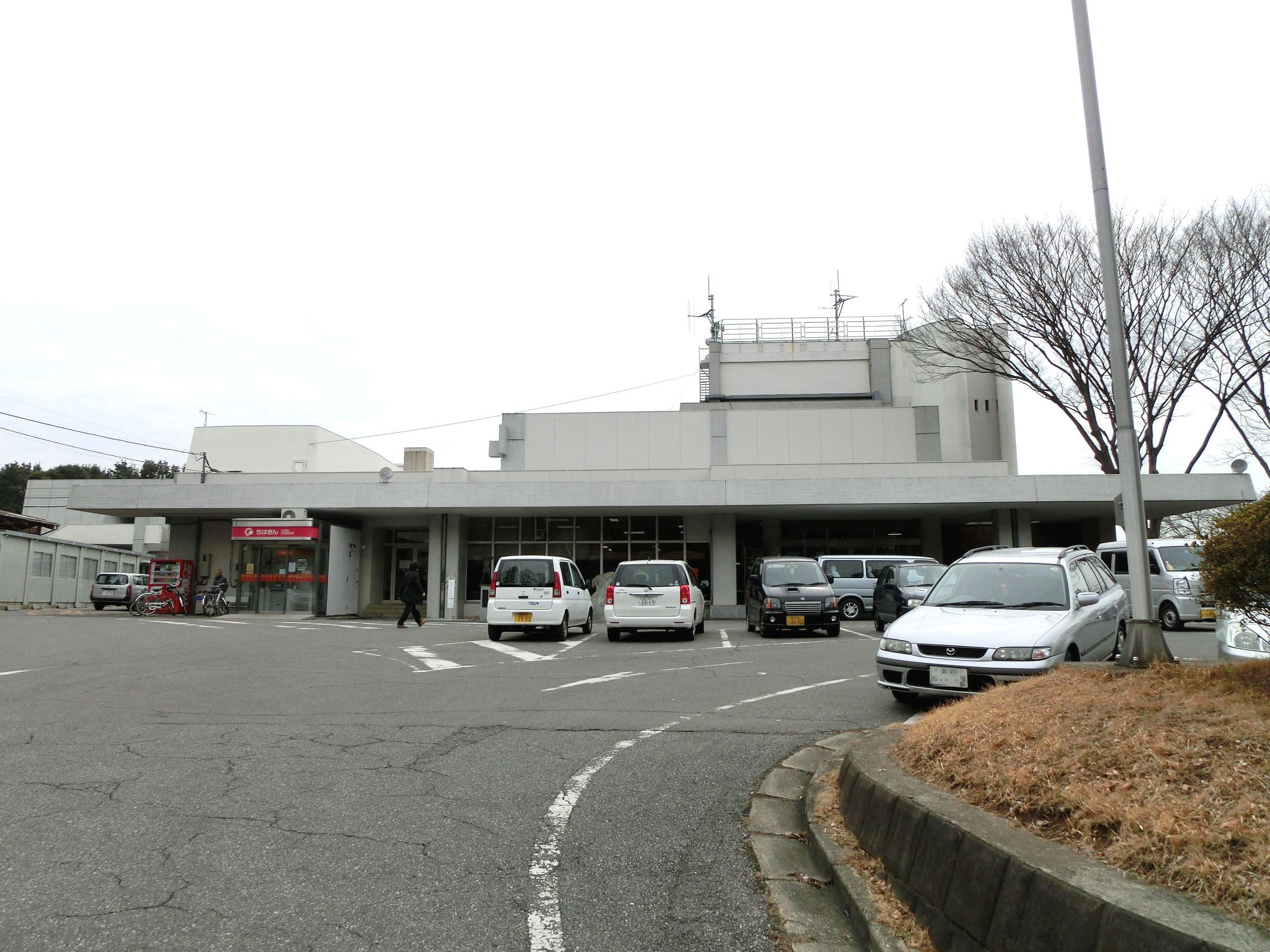
Abiko City Hall

Abiko (我孫子市, Abiko-shi; Japanese pronunciation: [ä̀.bʲí.kó̞(.ɕì)]) is a city located in Chiba Prefecture, Japan. As of 1 February 2024, the city had an estimated population of 131,183 in 62,193 households and a population density of 3000 persons per km^{2}. The total area of the city is 43.19 square kilometres (16.68 sq mi).

== Geography ==
Abiko is located in the northwestern part of Chiba prefecture, about 30 kilometers from the prefectural capital of Chiba, and within 30 to 40 kilometers of central Tokyo. It is separated from Ibaraki Prefecture in the north by the Tone River. The city is located on the Shimosa Plateau, with an average elevation of about 20 meters above sea level. The city stretches about 14 kilometers east-to-west and about 4 to 6 kilometers north-to-south.

=== Neighboring municipalities ===
Chiba Prefecture

- Inzai
- Kashiwa

Ibaraki Prefecture

- Toride
- Tone

=== Climate ===
Abiko has a humid subtropical climate (Köppen Cfa) characterized by warm summers and cool winters with light to no snowfall. The average annual temperature in Abiko is 14.7 °C. The average annual rainfall is 1345 mm with September as the wettest month. The temperatures are highest on average in August, at around 26.3 °C, and lowest in January, at around 3.8 °C.

Climate data for Abiko (2010−2020 normals, extremes 2010−present)
Month	Jan	Feb	Mar	Apr	May	Jun	Jul	Aug	Sep	Oct	Nov	Dec	Year
Record high °C (°F)	18.0 (64.4)	21.3 (70.3)	24.6 (76.3)	28.9 (84.0)	34.4 (93.9)	34.5 (94.1)	38.5 (101.3)	39.2 (102.6)	36.5 (97.7)	32.1 (89.8)	24.3 (75.7)	22.6 (72.7)	39.2 (102.6)
Mean daily maximum °C (°F)	9.0 (48.2)	9.8 (49.6)	13.8 (56.8)	18.4 (65.1)	23.7 (74.7)	25.7 (78.3)	29.8 (85.6)	31.5 (88.7)	27.3 (81.1)	21.6 (70.9)	16.3 (61.3)	11.1 (52.0)	19.8 (67.7)
Daily mean °C (°F)	3.3 (37.9)	4.5 (40.1)	8.3 (46.9)	12.8 (55.0)	18.3 (64.9)	21.2 (70.2)	25.1 (77.2)	26.6 (79.9)	22.7 (72.9)	17.0 (62.6)	11.1 (52.0)	5.7 (42.3)	14.7 (58.5)
Mean daily minimum °C (°F)	−1.7 (28.9)	−0.3 (31.5)	3.2 (37.8)	7.6 (45.7)	13.6 (56.5)	17.6 (63.7)	21.8 (71.2)	23.1 (73.6)	19.2 (66.6)	13.2 (55.8)	6.6 (43.9)	0.9 (33.6)	10.4 (50.7)
Record low °C (°F)	−7.2 (19.0)	−6.9 (19.6)	−3.4 (25.9)	−1.1 (30.0)	5.3 (41.5)	9.7 (49.5)	15.1 (59.2)	15.9 (60.6)	10.0 (50.0)	4.2 (39.6)	−1.8 (28.8)	−5.0 (23.0)	−7.2 (19.0)
Average precipitation mm (inches)	50.5 (1.99)	63.5 (2.50)	98.4 (3.87)	124.9 (4.92)	112.3 (4.42)	149.9 (5.90)	126.2 (4.97)	82.5 (3.25)	211.6 (8.33)	236.4 (9.31)	84.3 (3.32)	58.4 (2.30)	1,398.9 (55.08)
Average rainy days (≥ 1.0 mm)	4.4	6.4	9.1	10.0	8.5	11.6	10.6	7.0	11.5	10.8	8.1	5.8	103.8
Mean monthly sunshine hours	206.9	166.1	189.1	187.0	210.9	147.9	173.5	210.6	143.4	133.9	153.6	175.6	2,098.5
Source: Japan Meteorological Agency

== Demographics ==
Per Japanese census data, the population of Abiko has recently plateaued after a long period of growth.

Historical population
Year	Pop.	±%
1950	23,120	—
1960	27,063	+17.1%
1970	49,240	+81.9%
1980	101,061	+105.2%
1990	120,628	+19.4%
2000	127,733	+5.9%
2010	134,017	+4.9%
2020	130,510	−2.6%

== History ==
The area around Abiko has been inhabited since Japanese Paleolithic times, and archaeologists have found stone tools dated from 30,000 years ago. During the Edo period, Abiko was a river port on the Tone River and a post station on the Mito Kaidō, a highway connecting Edo with Mito. After the Meiji Restoration, Abiko Town was created in Minamisoma District, Chiba Prefecture on April 1, 1889, along with the town of Fusa and village of Kohoku with the establishment of the modern municipalities system. Abiko was transferred to Higashikatsushika District in 1897. From the Taisho period to the early Showa period, Abiko was sometimes called "Kamakura in the north" as many prominent cultural figures such as Naoya Shiga, Saneatsu Mushanokoji, Soetsu Yanagi, and Bernard Leach had villas in the town, which became a center for the Shirakabaha literary coterie. On November 1, 1954, it annexed neighboring Tomise village from the same district. On April 29, 1955, Abiko annexed Fusa Town and Kohoku Village. Abiko achieved city status on July 1, 1970. In 2003, a proposal to merge Abiko with neighboring city of Kashiwa and the town of Shōnan was defeated by a public referendum. Parts of the city were damaged by soil liquefaction due to the 2011 Tōhoku earthquake and tsunami.

== Government ==
Abiko has a mayor-council form of government with a directly elected mayor and a unicameral city council of 24 members. Abiko contributes two members to the Chiba Prefectural Assembly. In terms of national politics, the city is part of Chiba 8th district of the lower house of the Diet of Japan.

== Economy ==
Although agriculture still plays a significant role in the local economy, Abiko is largely a regional commercial center and from the 1970s developed into a commuter town for nearby Chiba and Tokyo. The commuting rate is 32.3% for central Tokyo and 12.4% for Kashiwa City (both according to the 2010 census).

== Education ==
=== Universities ===
- Chuo Gakuin University
- Kawamura Gakuen Women's University

=== Primary and secondary education ===
Abiko has 13 public elementary schools and six public middle schools operated by the city government, and two public high schools operated by the Chiba Prefectural Board of Education. There are also two private high schools. The prefecture also operates one special education school for the handicapped.

== Transportation ==
=== Railway ===
JR East – Jōban Line

- Abiko – Tennōdai

JR East – Narita Line

- Abiko - Higashi-Abiko - Kohoku - Araki - Fusa

=== Highway ===
- National Route 6
- National Route 294
- National Route 356

== Point of interest ==
- Abiko City Museum of Birds
- Akebonoyama Park
- Yamashina Institute for Ornithology

== Notable people ==
- Isao Aoki, professional golfer
- Morinosuke Chiwaki, founder of Japan Dental Association
- Seiji Ebihara, professional golfer
- Makoto Kaneko, professional baseball player
- Hajime Meshiai, professional golfer
- Ryo Takeuchi, filmmaker
- Muga Takewaki, actor
- Asuka Tono, Takarazuka musician
- Keito Nakamura, professional soccer player
