= Abiko Station (Chiba) =

Railway station in Abiko, Chiba Prefecture, Japan

JJ08 JL30 Abiko Station 我孫子駅
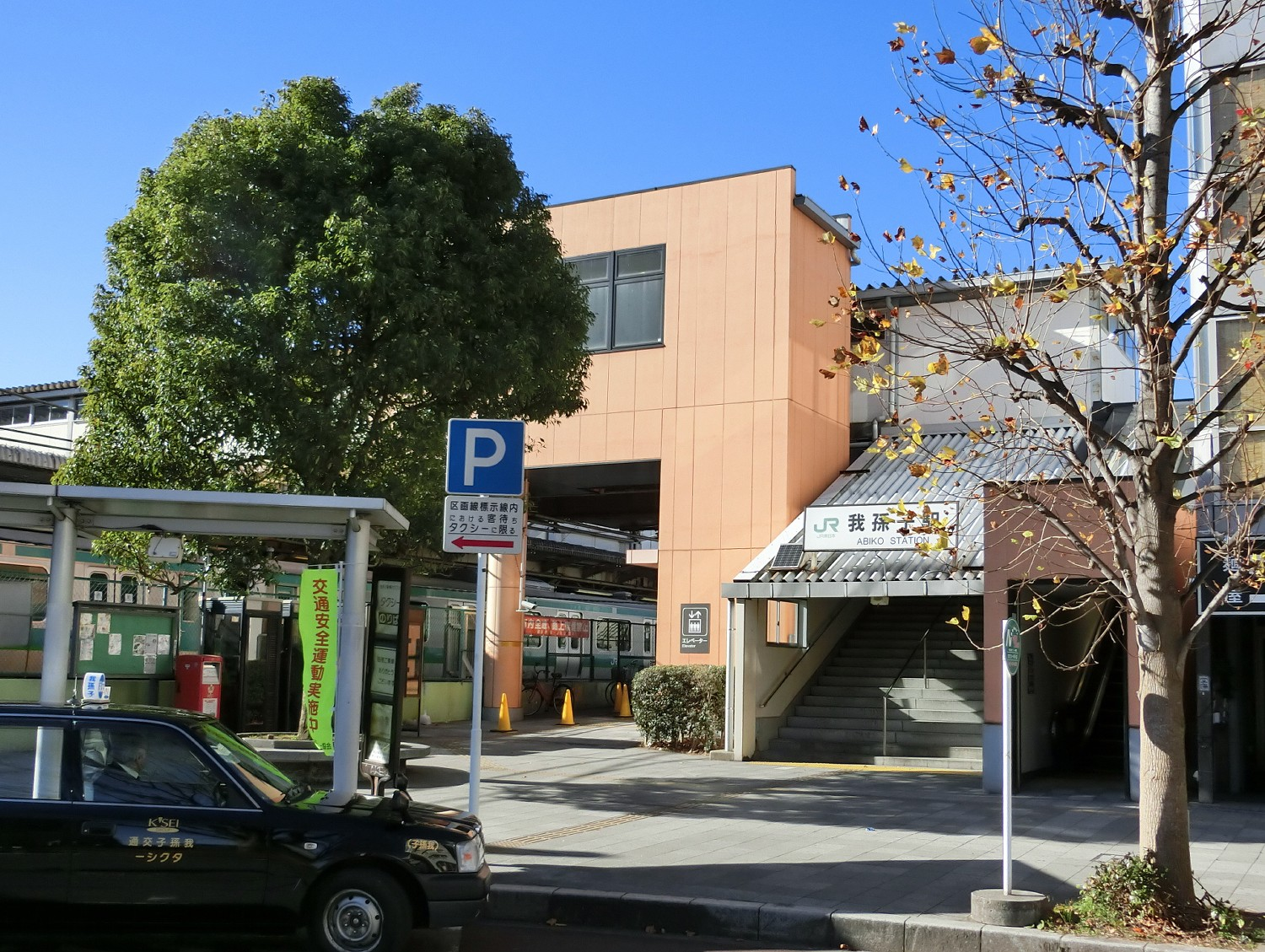
- Abiko Station in December 2013

General information
- Location: 2 Honchō, Abiko-shi, Chiba-ken 270-1151; Japan
- Coordinates: 35°52′21.77″N 140°0′38.84″E
- Operator: JR East
- Lines: Jōban Line (Rapid); Jōban Line (Local); ■ Narita Line
- Distance: 31.3 km from Ueno
- Platforms: 3 island + 1 side platform
- Tracks: 7
- Connections: Bus terminal

Other information
- Status: Staffed (Midori no Madoguchi )
- Website: www.jreast.co.jp/estation/station/info.aspx?StationCd=72

History
- Opened: 25 December 1896

Passengers
- FY2019: 31,590 daily

Services
Preceding station	JR East	Following station
Kashiwa JJ07 towards Shinagawa	Jōban Line (Rapid) Rapid	Tennōdai JJ09 towards Toride
Kashiwa JJ07 towards Shinagawa	Jōban Line Local-Futsuu	Tennōdai JJ09 towards Sendai
Kita-Kashiwa JL29 towards Ayase	Jōban Line (Local) Local-Kankō	Tennōdai JL31 (limited service) towards Toride
through to Jōban Line	Narita Line Abiko branch	Higashi-Abiko towards Narita
Location
- Location within Chiba Prefecture Location within Japan

Abiko Station (我孫子駅, Abiko-eki) is a junction passenger railway station in the city of Abiko, Chiba Prefecture Japan, operated by East Japan Railway Company (JR East).

== Lines ==
Abiko is served by both the Jōban Line and the Narita Line. It is 31.3 km from the terminus of the Jōban Line at Ueno Station in Tokyo, and forms the terminus for the Abiko Branch Line of the Narita Line.

== Layout ==
The station is an elevated station with three island platforms and one side platform serving seven tracks. The station has a "Midori no Madoguchi" staffed ticket office.

=== Platforms ===
1	Jōban Line (Rapid)	for Tennōdai ,Toride, Tsuchiura, Ishioka, and Mito
2	Jōban Line (Rapid)	for Tennōdai, Toride, Tsuchiura, and Mito
2	Jōban Line (Rapid)	for Kashiwa, Matsudo, Kita-Senju, and Ueno; Ueno-Tokyo Line for Tokyo and Shinagawa
2	■ Narita Line	for Kohoku, Kioroshi, and Narita
4	■ Narita Line	for Kohoku, Kioroshi, and Narita
4	Jōban Line (Rapid)	for Kashiwa, Matsudo, Kita-Senju, and Ueno; Ueno-Tokyo Line for Tokyo and Shinagawa
5	Jōban Line (Rapid)	for Kashiwa, Matsudo, Kita-Senju, and Ueno; Ueno-Tokyo Line Line for Tokyo and Shinagawa
6	Jōban Line (Local)	for Tennōdai and Toride
6	Jōban Line (Local)	for Kashiwa, Matsudo, Ayase; Tokyo Metro Chiyoda Line for Kita-senju and Yoyogi-uehara
7	Jōban Line (Local)	for Tennōdai and Toride
7	Jōban Line (Local)	for Kashiwa, Matsudo, Ayase; Tokyo Metro Chiyoda Line for Kita-senju, and Yoyogi-uehara
8	Jōban Line (Local)	for Kashiwa, Matsudo, Ayase; Tokyo Metro Chiyoda Line for Kita-senju, and Yoyogi-uehara

== History ==
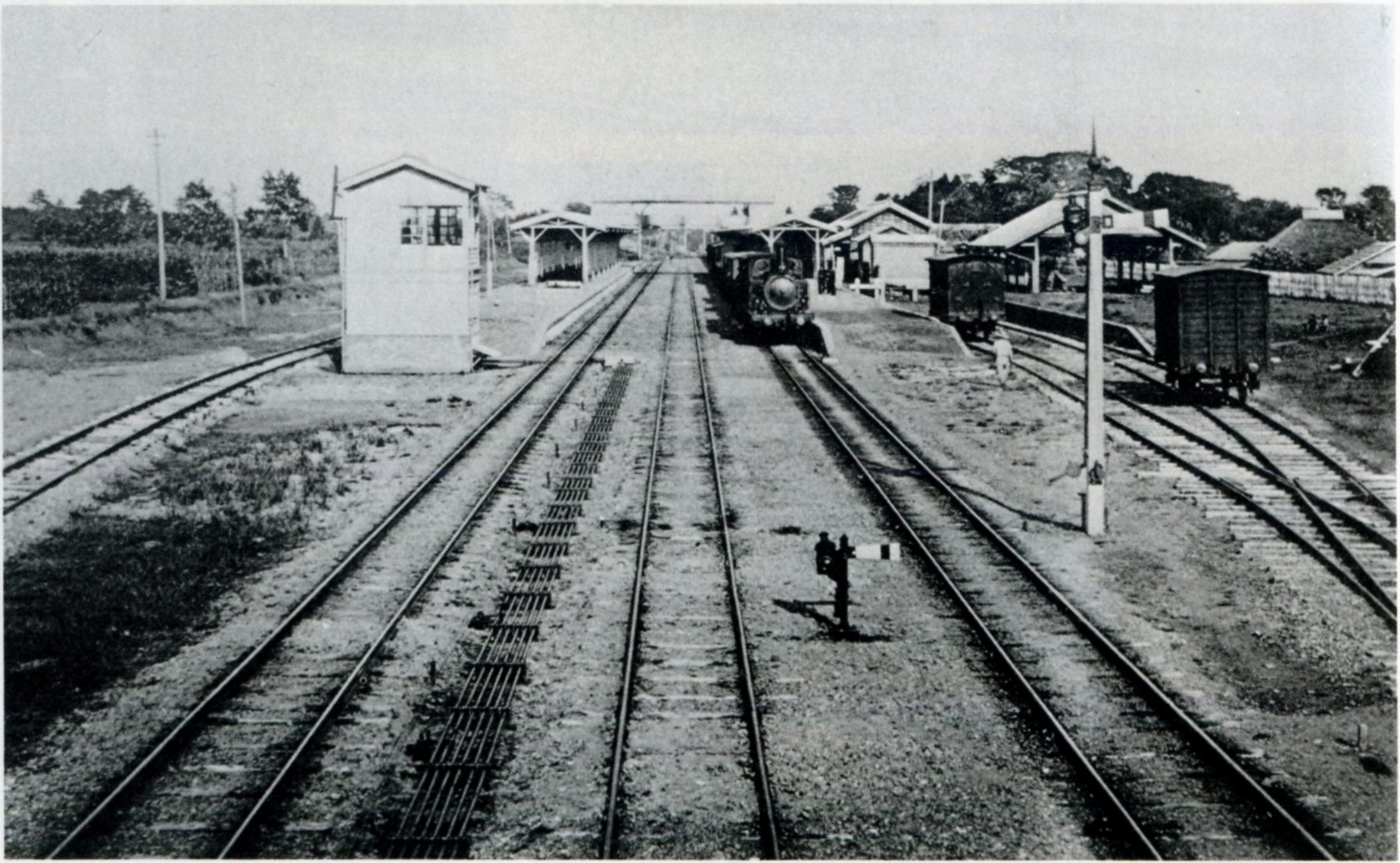
Abiko Station ca. 1905

Abiko Station opened on 25 December 1896. With the privatization of Japanese National Railways (JNR) on 1 April 1987, the station came under the control of JR East.

== Passenger statistics ==
In fiscal 2019, the station was used by an average of 31,590 passengers daily.

== Surrounding area ==
- National Route 356
- Abiko City Hall

== See also ==
- List of railway stations in Japan
