= Narita Station =

Railway station in Narita, Chiba Prefecture, Japan

JO35 Narita Station 成田駅
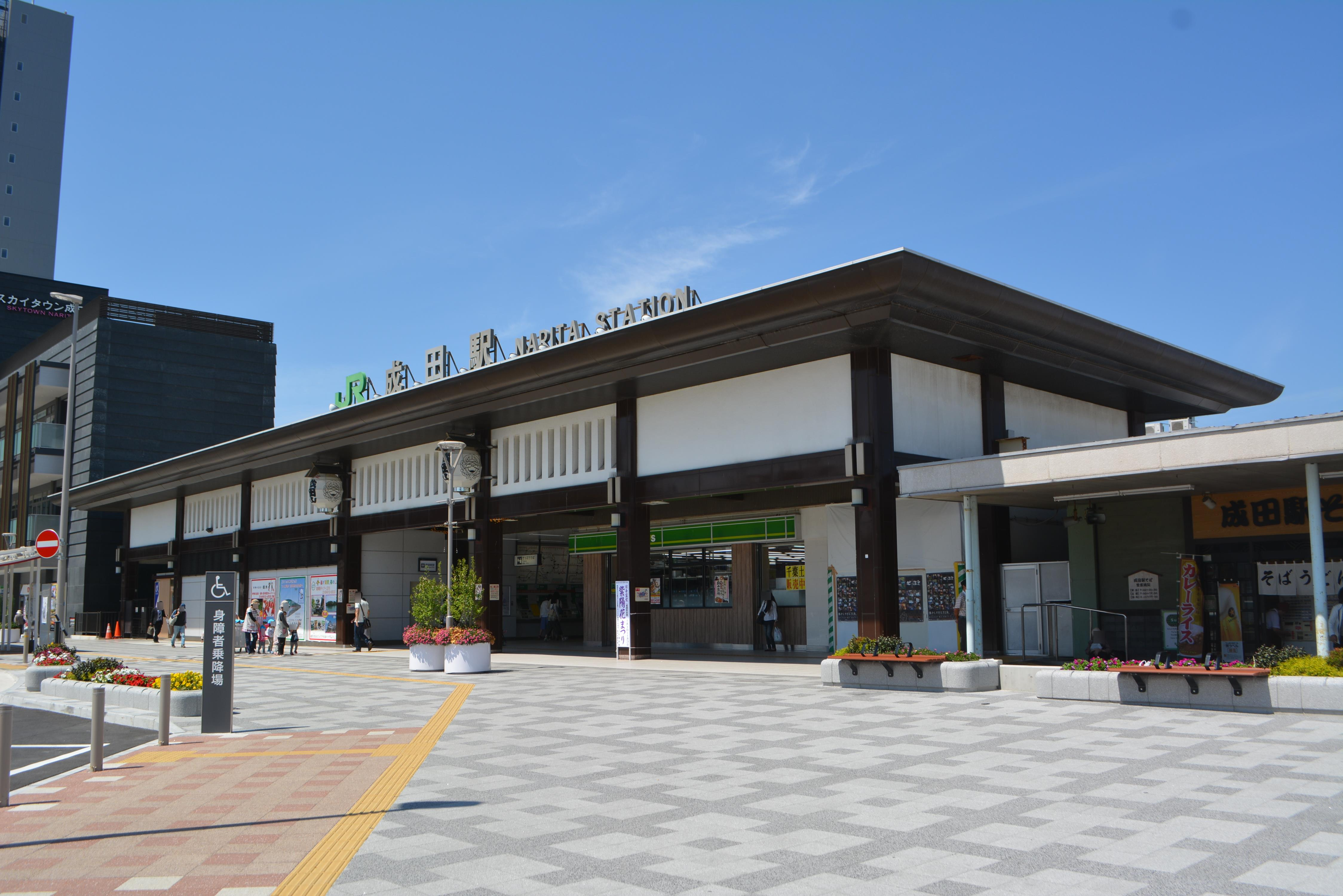
- The station entrance in May 2016

General information
- Location: 839 Hanazakichō, Narita-shi, Chiba-ken; Japan
- Coordinates: 35.7778492°N 140.3140837°E
- Operator: JR East
- Line: ■ Narita Line
- Platforms: 1 side platform + 2 island platforms
- Tracks: 6
- Connections: KS40 Keisei Narita Station

Construction
- Structure type: 13.1 from Sakura

Other information
- Status: Staffed (Midori no Madoguchi)
- Station code: JO35
- Website: Official website

History
- Opened: 19 January 1897

Passengers
- FY2019: 16,103
Services
Preceding station	JR East	Following station
Sakura JO33 (rush periods) towards Shinjuku or Ōfuna	Narita Express (rush periods)	Narita Airport Terminal 2·3 JO36 towards Narita Airport Terminal 1
Shisui JO34 towards Chiba	Narita Line Main Line	Kuzumi towards Chōshi
Shisui JO34 towards Chiba	Narita Line Airport branch Rapid Local	Narita Airport Terminal 2·3 JO36 towards Narita Airport Terminal 1
Terminus	Narita Line Abiko branch	Shimosa-Manzaki towards Abiko
Location
- Location within Chiba Prefecture Location within Japan

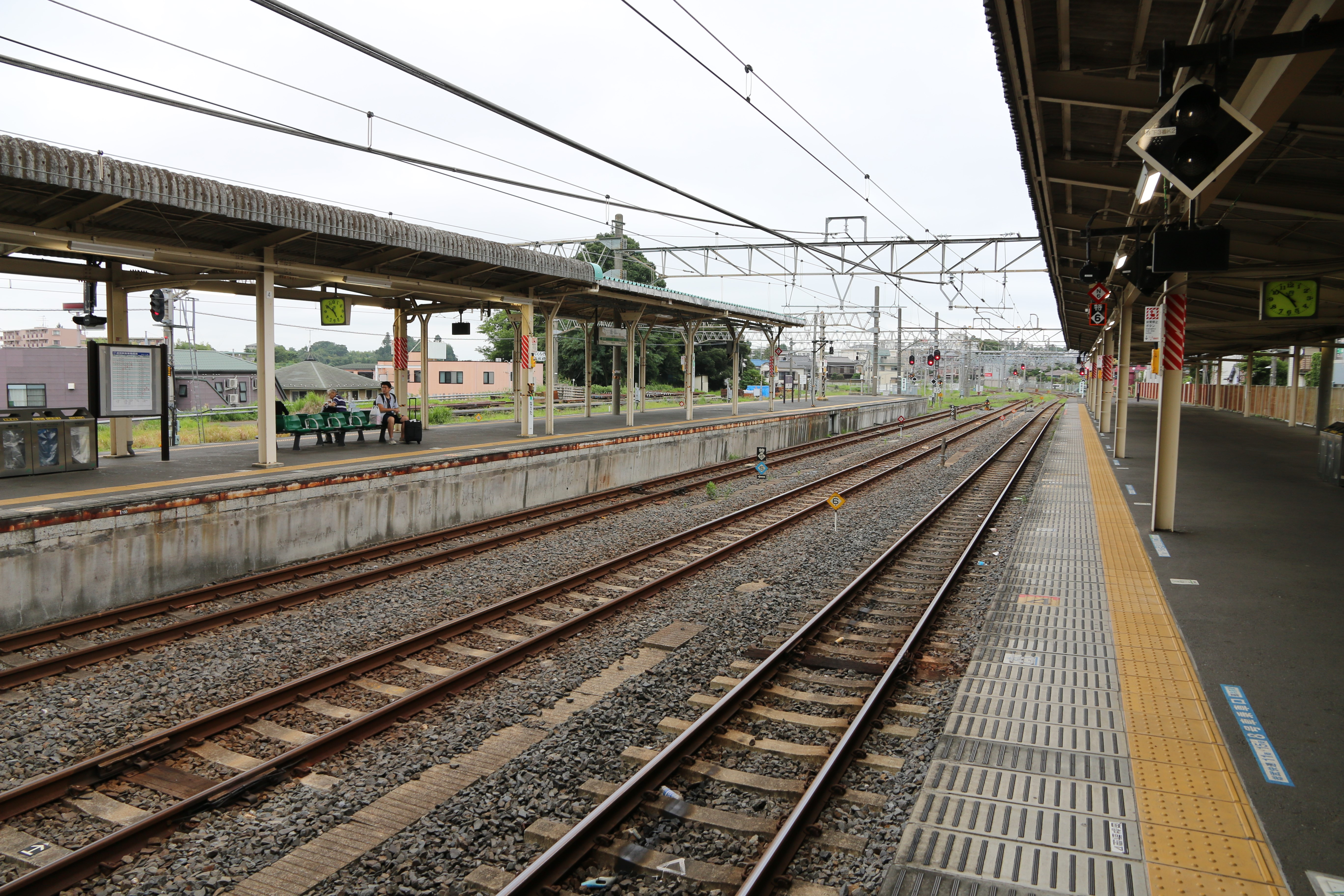
Station platforms, August 2017

Narita Station (成田駅, Narita-eki) is a passenger railway station in the city of Narita, Chiba, operated by the East Japan Railway Company (JR East).

== Lines ==
Narita Station is served by the Narita Line, and is located 13.1 kilometers (8.1 mi) from the terminus of line at Sakura Station and 68.5 kilometers (42.6 mi) from Tokyo Station.

== Station layout ==
Platform layout diagram

Narita Station has a single side platform and two island platforms, connected to the station building though footbridges to a common concourse. Track 4 is not served by a platform, and is used by non-stop Narita Express and Ayame limited express services. The station used to have a Midori no Madoguchi staffed ticket office.

=== Platforms ===
1	■ Narita Line	for Chiba and Tokyo (via Sōbu Line (Rapid))
1	■ Narita Line	some trains for Narita Airport
2	■ Narita Line	for Chiba and Tokyo (via Sōbu Line (Rapid))
2	■ Narita Line	some trains for Chōshi
3	■ Narita Line	for Narita Airport and Kashimajingū
3	■ Narita Line	some trains for Chiba and Tokyo (via Sōbu Line (Rapid))
5	■ Narita Line	for Chōshi, Kashimajingū and Narita Airport
5	■ Narita Line	some trains for Chiba and Tokyo (via Sōbu Line (Rapid))
5	■ Narita Line	some trains for Abiko, Ueno, Tokyo and Shinagawa (via Jōban Line (Rapid) and Ueno–Tokyo Line)
6	■ Narita Line (Abiko Branch Line)	for Abiko, Ueno, Tokyo and Shinagawa (via Jōban Line (Rapid) and Ueno–Tokyo Line)

== History ==
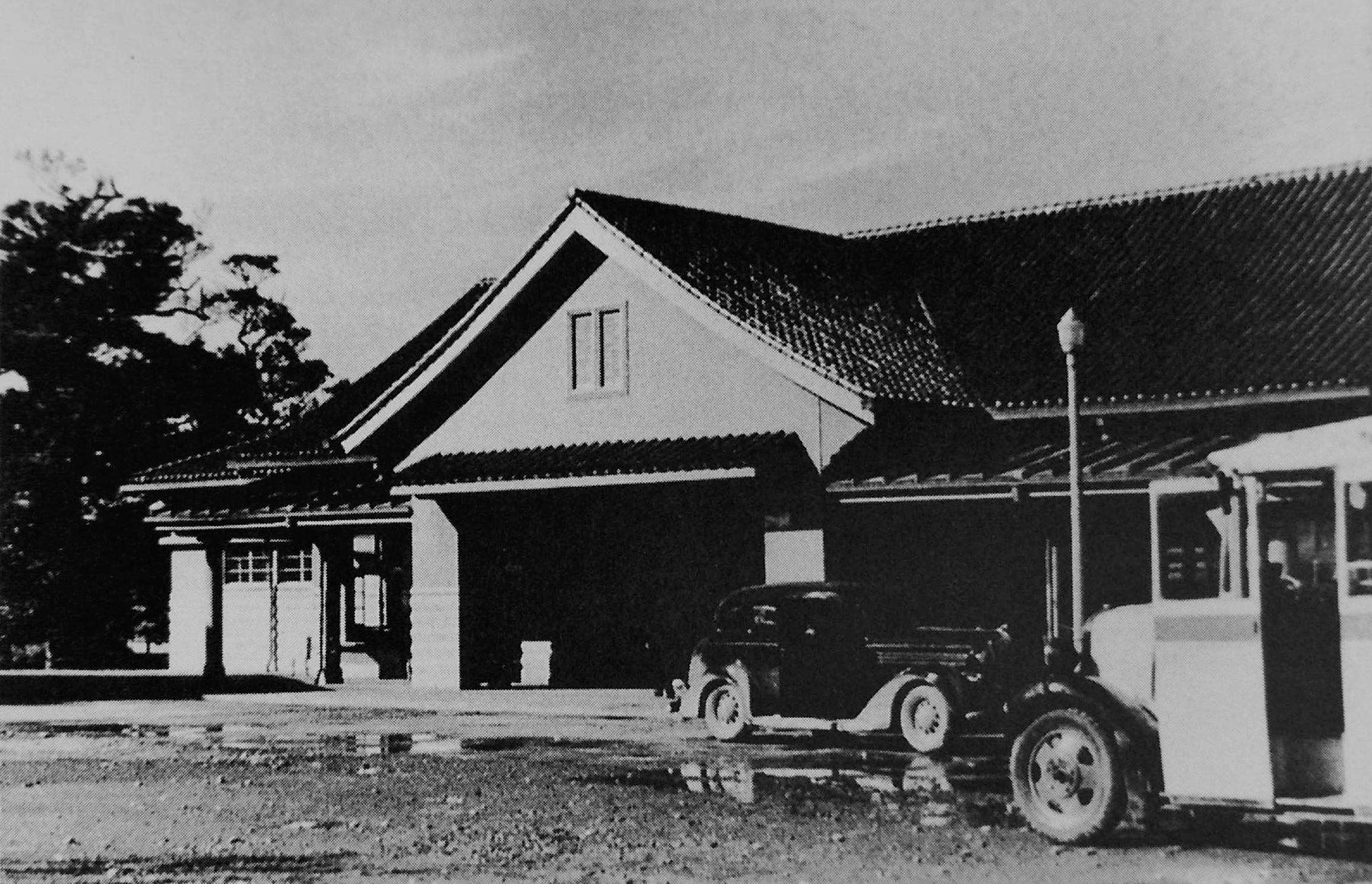
The station forecourt in 1937

Narita Station opened on 19 January 1897 as a terminal station on the Narita Railway Company for both freight and passenger operations. The line was extended to Ajiki in 1902. The Chiba Prefectural Tako Line began operations on 1 July 1911, connecting Narita with Tako, Chiba. The Narita Railway was nationalised on 1 September 1920, becoming part of the Japanese Government Railway (JGR), and on 1 April 1927, the Chiba Prefectural Tako Line was renamed the Narita Railway Company Tako Line. This line stopped operations on 11 January 1944 due to wartime conditions, and was officially abolished in 1946. After World War II, the JGR became the Japan National Railways (JNR). The station building was reconstructed from 1977–1979. The station was absorbed into the JR East network upon the privatization of the Japanese National Railways (JNR) on 1 April 1987. The spur line to Narita Airport was completed on 19 March 1991.

== Passenger statistics ==
In fiscal 2019, the station was used by an average of 16,103 passengers daily (boarding passengers only).

== Surrounding area ==
- Keisei-Narita Station
- Narita City Hall
- Shimofusa Post Office

== See also ==
- List of railway stations in Japan
