= Japan National Route 356 =

Road in Chiba prefecture, Japan

National Route 356
- 国道356号
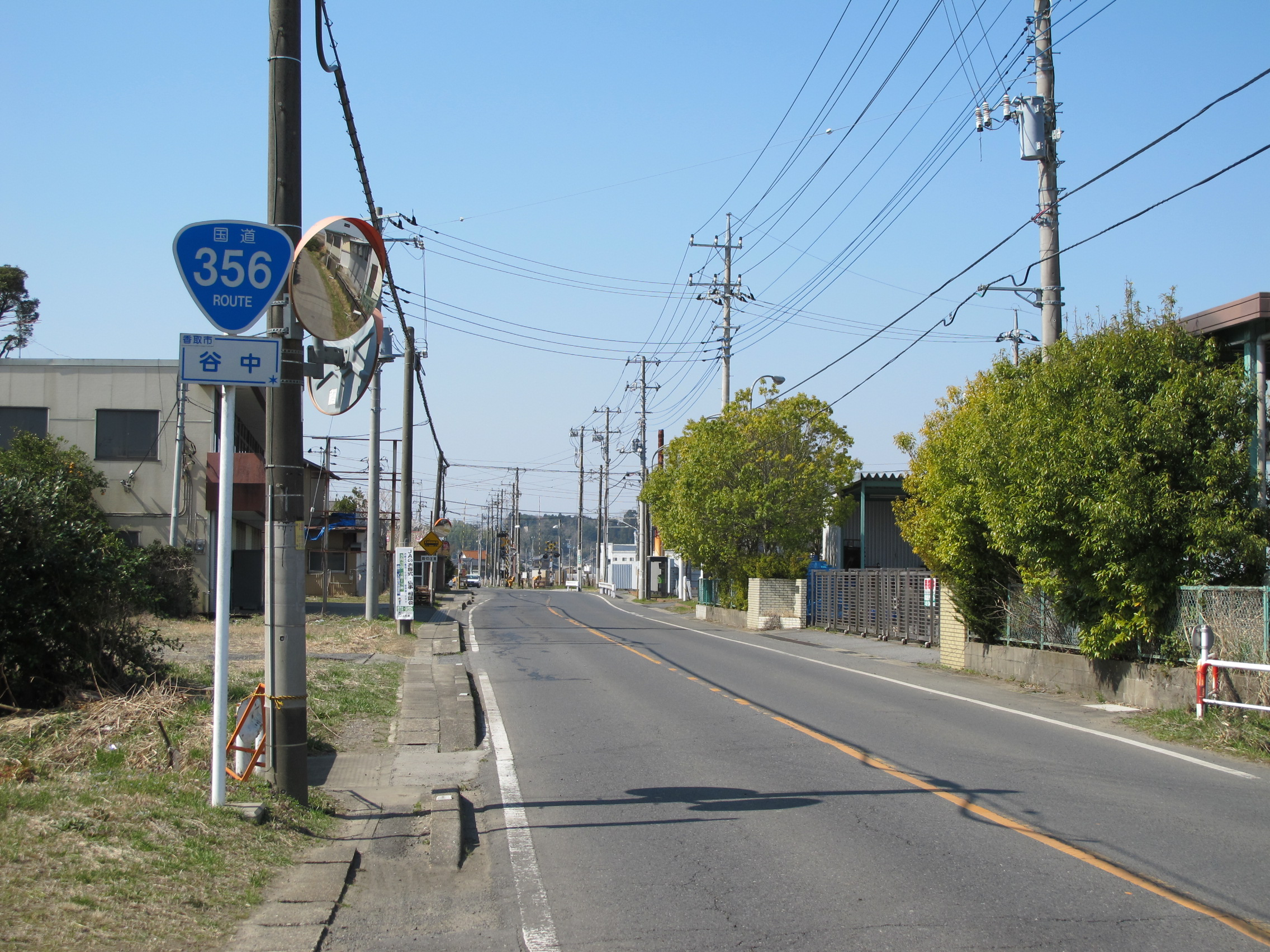

Route information
- Length: 91.7 km (57.0 mi)
- Existed: 1 April 1975–present

Major junctions
- West end: National Route 6 in Abiko, Chiba
- East end: National Route 124 / National Route 126 in Chōshi, Chiba

Location
- Country: Japan

Highway system
- National highways of Japan; Expressways of Japan
← National Route 355	→ National Route 357

National Route 356 is a national highway of Japan connecting Chōshi, Chiba and Abiko, Chiba in Japan, with a total length of 91.7 km (56.98 mi).
