= Byōbugaura =

Coordinates: 35°42′10″N 140°47′17″E

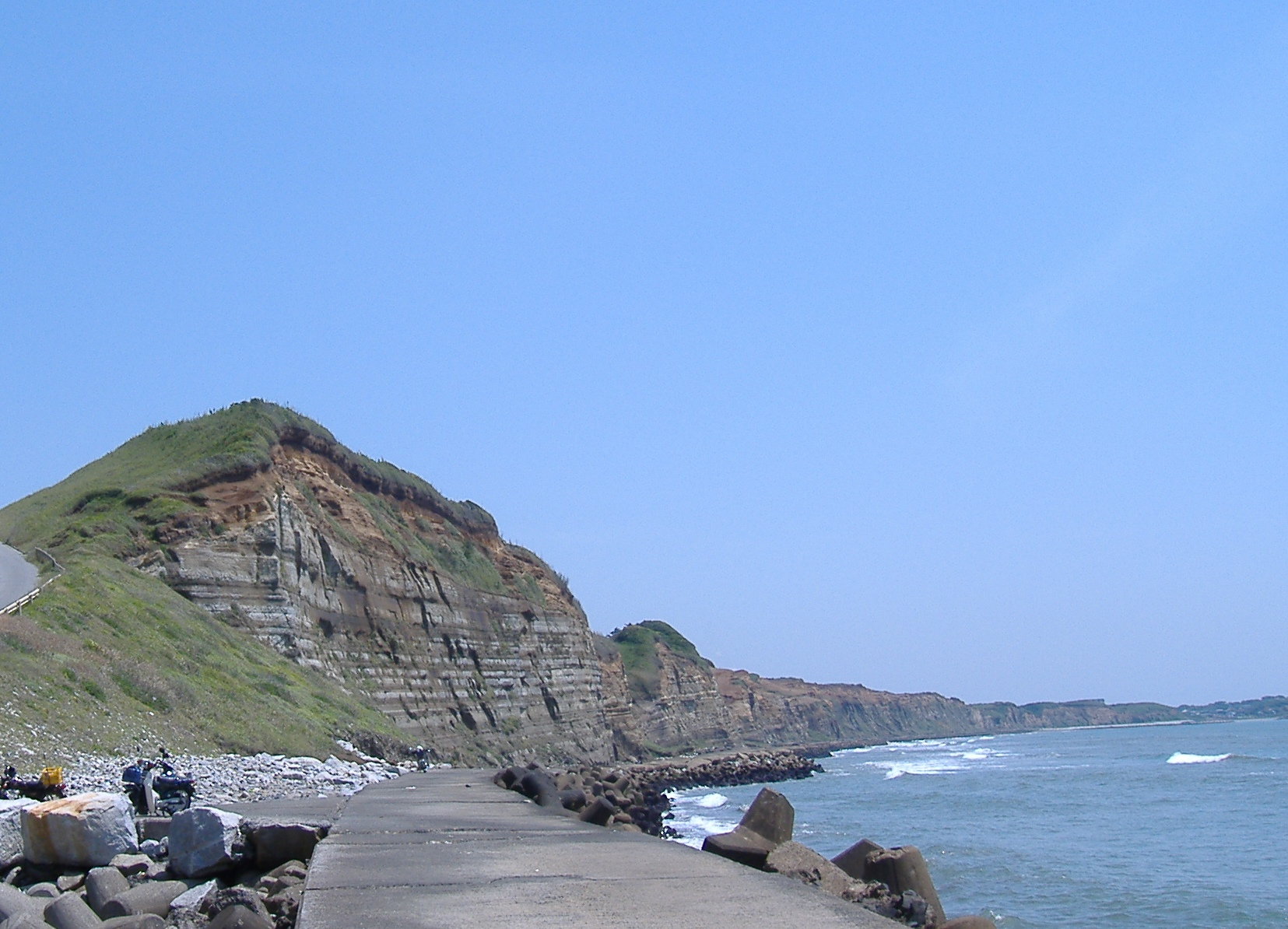
Marine cliffs of Byōbugaura

Byōbugaura (屏風ヶ浦, Byōbugaura) is an inlet on the northeast coast of Chiba Prefecture that ranges from Cape Inubō in Chōshi to Cape Gyōbumi in Asahi. Byōbugaura is an important part of the coastal area in Chiba Prefecture, as it connects the northern point of the Pacific Ocean coast at Chōshi to Kujūkuri Beach, which covers a large portion of the western side of the prefecture. The name of the inlet is formed from the word "byōbu", the Japanese-style folding screen, and "ura", meaning an inlet. Byōbugaura resembles the White Cliffs of Dover on the English Channel. For this reason the inlet is sometimes called Tōyō no Dōbā (東洋のドーバー), or "Dover of the East". Byōbugaura is known for its long history of marine erosion.

== Description ==
Byōbugaura spans approximately 10 m (33 ft), with precipitous cliffs that reach an altitude of 60 m (197 ft). Three strata are clearly visible on the cliffs of the inlet: the reddish Kantō Loam Stratum at the top, the Katori Statum in the middle, the chalky-white Iioka Stratum prominently on the cliff face, and the Naarai Stratum at the base. The Kantō Loam Stratum is red and is composed of material from volcanic eruptions of Mount Fuji and Mount Hakone, and the white portions of the cliff face consist of easily eroded clay.

== Marine erosion ==
Byōbugaura is noted in Japan for its historical and ongoing marine erosion due to the geological character of the inlet and the near-constant violent waves of the Pacific Ocean in the area. About 6 kilometres (3.7 mi) of land has been lost to erosion in the past 700 years. In modern times, in the 63 years between 1888 and 1951 30 metres (98 ft) of land have been lost. Tetrapods have been extensively installed at Byōbugaura to establish breakwaters, and have softened the retreat of land. The area of Byōbugaura on the border of Chōshi features marine caves, but most have also been lost due to marine erosion.

== Sanuki Castle ==
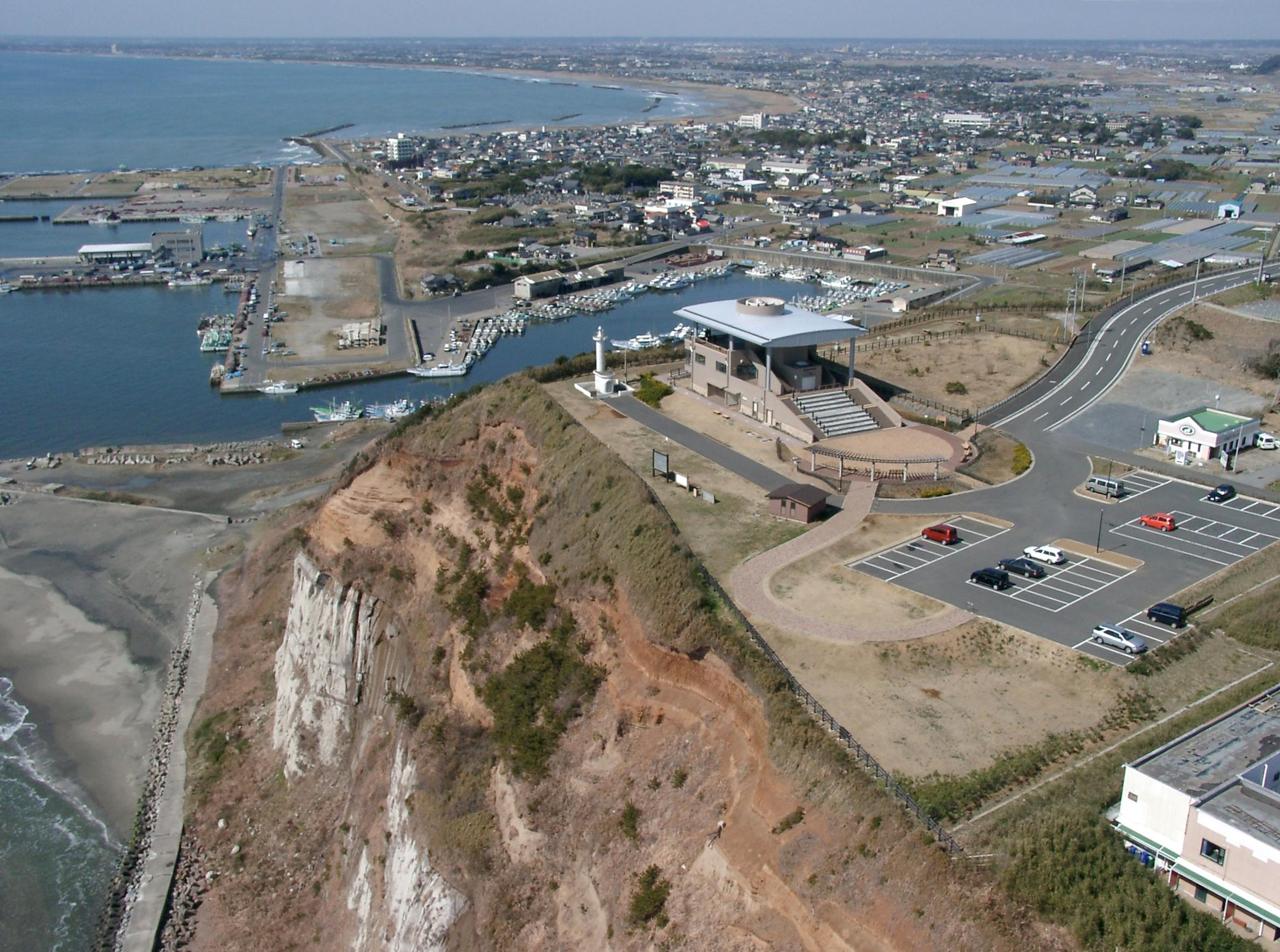
Southern end of Byōbugaura below the Iioka Lighthouse on Cape Gyōbumi

Byōbugaura was used as a defensive position overlooking the Pacific Ocean as early as the Kamakura period (1185–1333). Tsuneharu Kataoka (fl. 12th century), a grandson of the regional leader Taira no Tadatsune, used an area 100 metres (330 ft) in front of the present-day location of Iioka Lighthouse on Cape Gyōbumi to build Sanuki Castle. Kataoka plotted against the first Kamakura shōgun Minamoto no Yoritomo, and Kataoka, his family, and local supporters were defeated and killed at Sanuki Castle by members of the Chiba clan. The remains of the castle have been lost out to sea due to marine erosion.

== Current usage ==
Byōbugaura makes up the southernmost part of Suigō-Tsukuba Quasi-National Park, but because of the danger of violent waves off the inlet there are few recreational facilities built in the area. Byōbugaura, due to its dramatic coastal scenery and location near Tokyo, has been extensively used as a filming location for television dramas, commercials, and film. The precinct of the Tokai Shrine, above the inlet in Chōshi, has an important old-growth forest featuring the tabu species of laurel, castanopsis, and camellia, and is a Designated Natural Area of Chiba Prefecture. The areas above the inlet are also used for agricultural. The headland around Cape Inubō is cultivated for cabbage production.

== Transportation ==
Byōbugaura can be reached by bus from JR East Chōshi Station. The inlet can be viewed at the Chōshi Marina stop.

== See also ==
- Cape Inubō
- Cape Gyōbumi
- Kujūkuri Beach
