= Inubōsaki Lighthouse =

Inubōsaki Lighthouse Inubō Saki 犬吠埼燈台
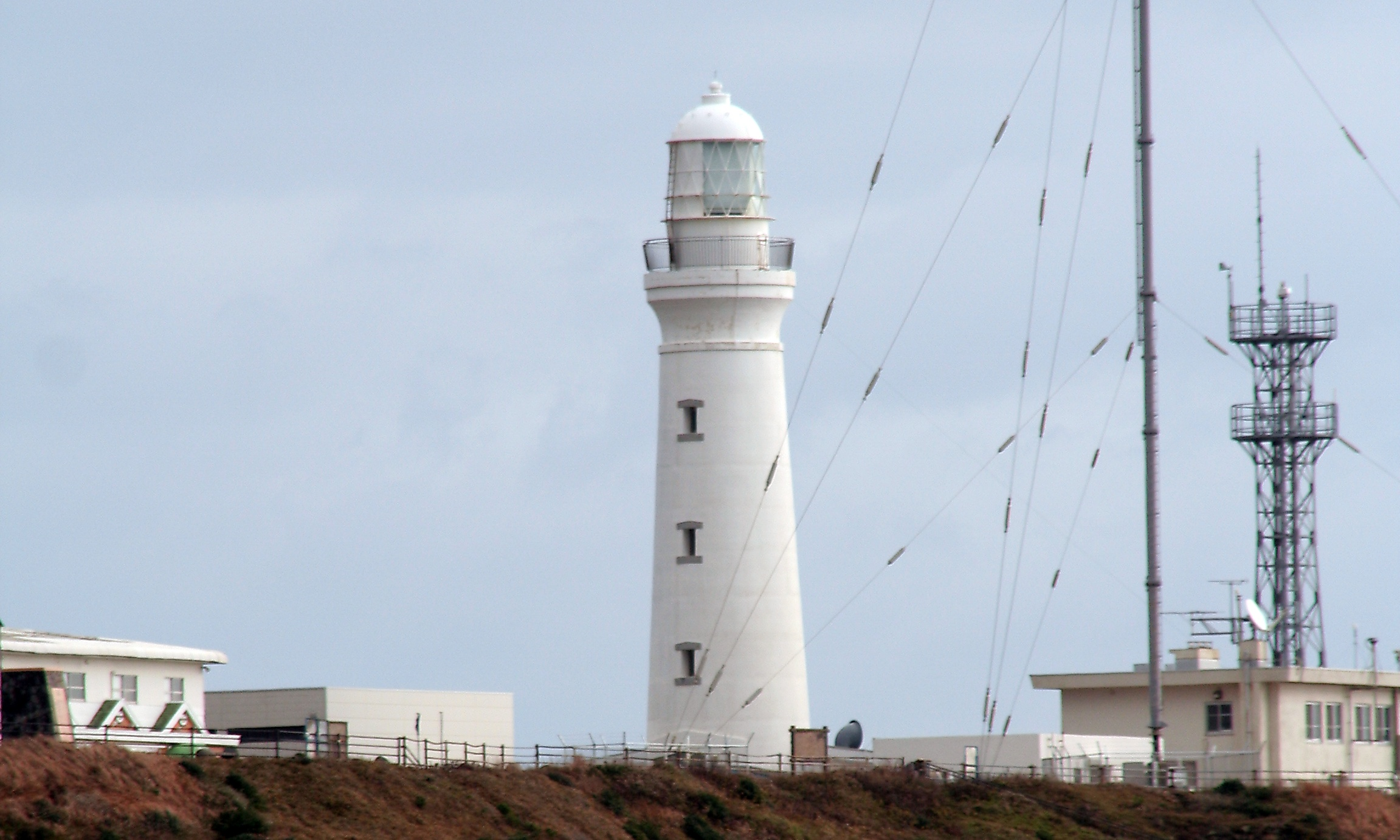
- Inubōsaki Lighthouse
- Location: Cape Inubō; Chōshi, Chiba; Japan
- Coordinates: 35°42′28.3″N 140°52′07.1″E

Tower
- Constructed: November 15, 1874
- Construction: brick tower
- Height: 31.3 metres (103 ft)
- Shape: cylindrical tower with balcony and lantern attached to 1-story keeper's house
- Markings: white tower and lantern
- Heritage: Important Cultural Property,

Light
- First lit: 15 November 1874
- Focal height: 51.8 metres (170 ft)
- Lens: First order Fresnel
- Intensity: 2,000,000 candela
- Range: 19.5 nautical miles (36.1 km; 22.4 mi)
- Characteristic: Fl W 15s
- Japan no.: JCG-1869

Inubōsaki Lighthouse (犬吠埼燈台, Inubōsaki tōdai) is a lighthouse on Cape Inubō, in the city of Chōshi, Chiba Prefecture Japan. It is notable as one of the few lighthouses whose original lens was a first order Fresnel lens, the strongest type of Fresnel lens. It is a Registered Tangible Cultural Property of Japan. The lighthouse is located within the borders of the Suigo-Tsukuba Quasi-National Park.

== History ==
Although not one of eight lighthouses to be built in Meiji period Japan under the provisions of the Anglo-Japanese Treaty of Amity and Commerce of 1858, signed by the Bakumatsu period Tokugawa Shogunate, the need for a lighthouse at Cape Inubō for the safety of vessels on the northeastern approaches to Tokyo was recognized at an early time after Japan was opened to the West. The wreck of the Tokugawa navy warship Mikaho in a typhoon on the rocks of Cape Inubō with the loss of 13 lives on October 6, 1868, further emphasized the need for a lighthouse. The lighthouse was designed and constructed by British engineer Richard Henry Brunton, born 1841 in Kincardineshire, Scotland, who was under contract by the new Meiji government. Brunton constructed another 25 lighthouses from far northern Hokkaidō to southern Kyūshū during his career in Japan.

Work began on the start of 1872. The Inubōsaki Lighthouse was lit on November 15, 1874. The structure consisted of a cylindrical tower made from the first domestically produced red bricks in Japan. Brunton supervised the construction of a brick factory in Tomioka Village in what is now part of Narita City, which produced 193,000 bricks for the project. However, Brunton was uncertain of the mechanical strength of the Japanese bricks, so he constructed the tower using a double thickness for the walls. The tower, at 31.5 meters, is also the second tallest brick lighthouse in Japan, surpassed only by the Shiriyazaki Lighthouse (also built by Brunton) in Higashidōri, Aomori Prefecture. Repairs for historical preservation and improvements in earthquake safety were made in 1977.

The Inubōsaki Lighthouse is currently open to the public, who may visit a small museum at its base, and climb to the top for a panoramic view over the Pacific Ocean. It is registered with the International Association of Lighthouse Authorities as one of the “One Hundred Most Important Lighthouses in the World".The lighthouse is currently maintained by the Japan Coast Guard. Furthermore, in 2020, it was registatered on Important Cultural Property (Japan).

== Gallery ==
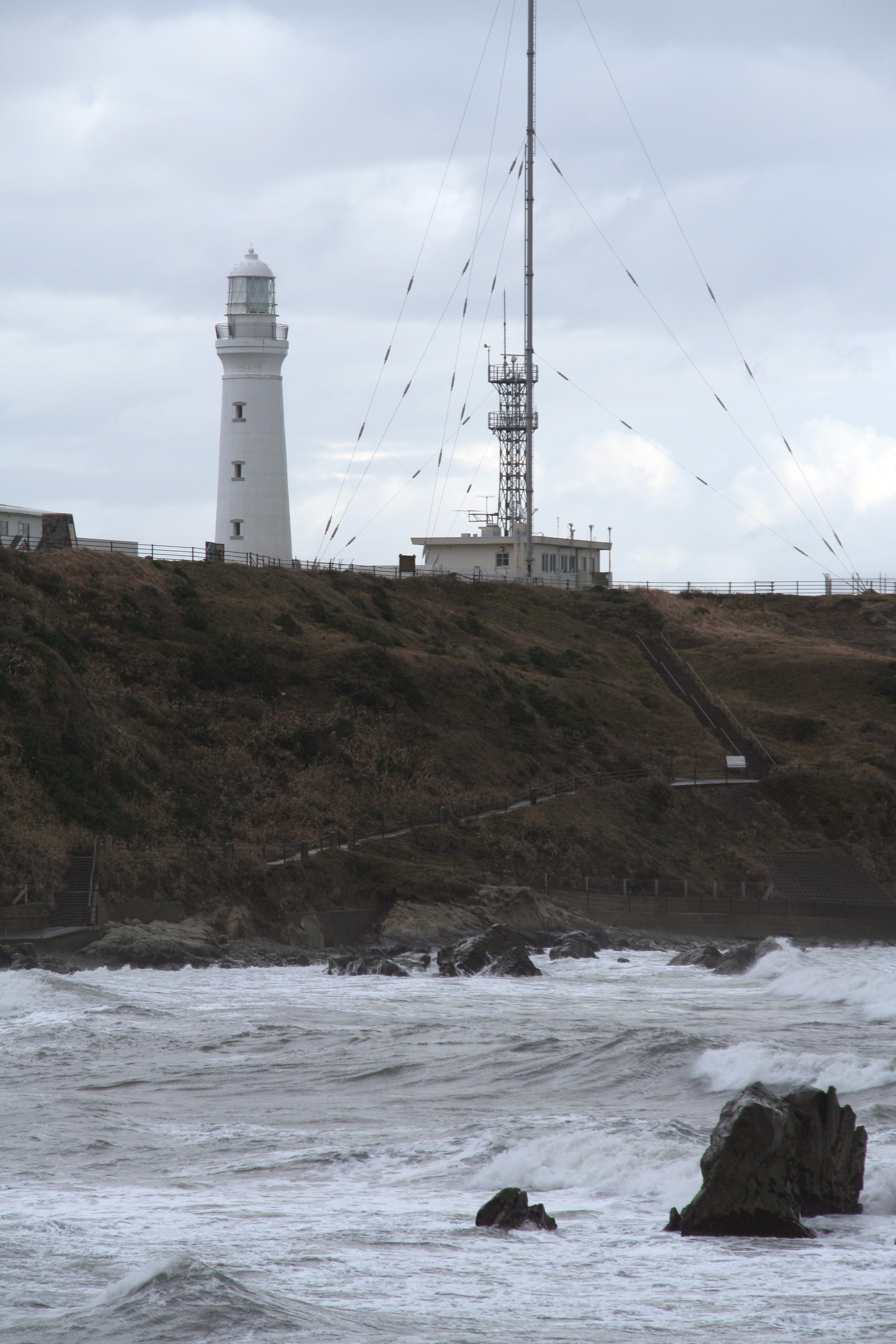
On the ocean

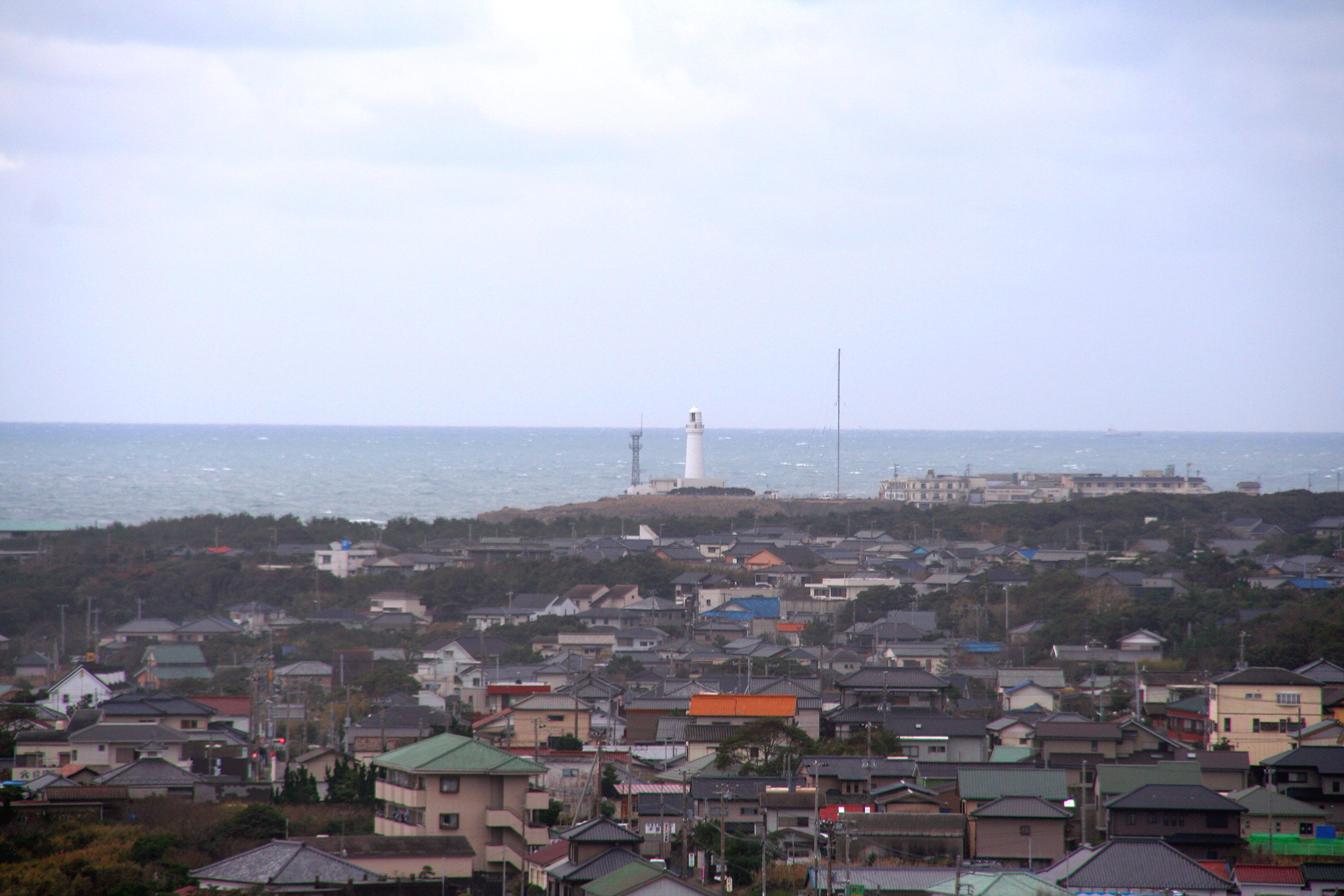
Surrounding town

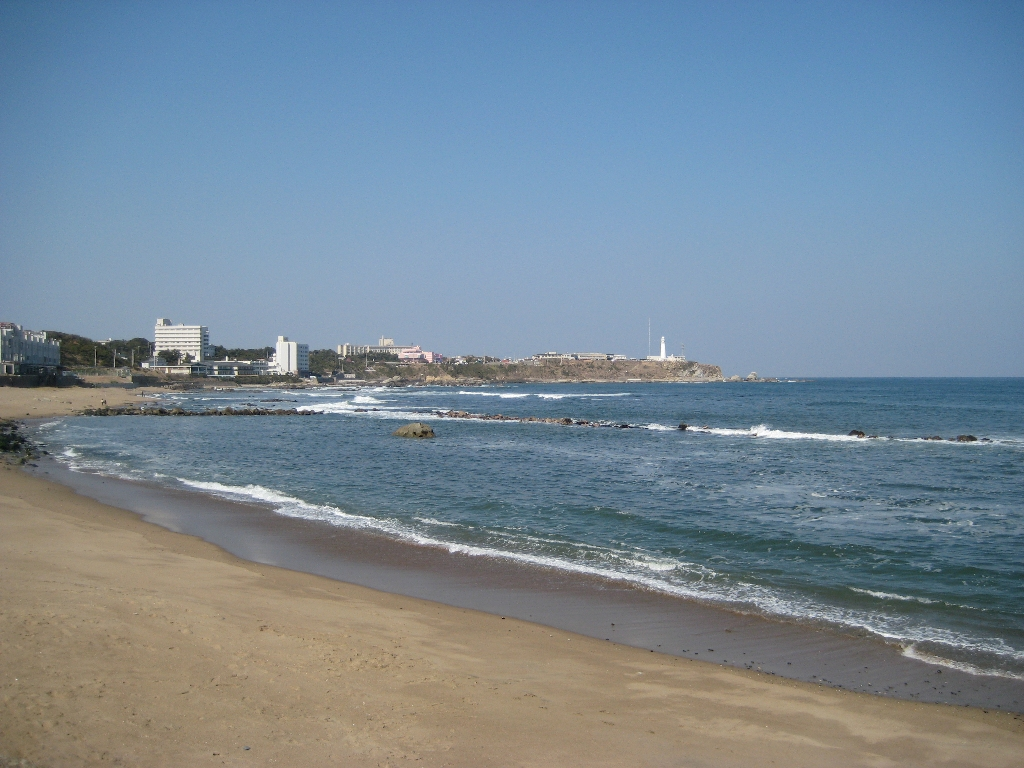
View from the beach

Several views

== See also ==
- List of lighthouses in Japan
- Inuboh Station
