= Mount Kaba (Ibaraki) =

Mountain in Japan

- 加波山
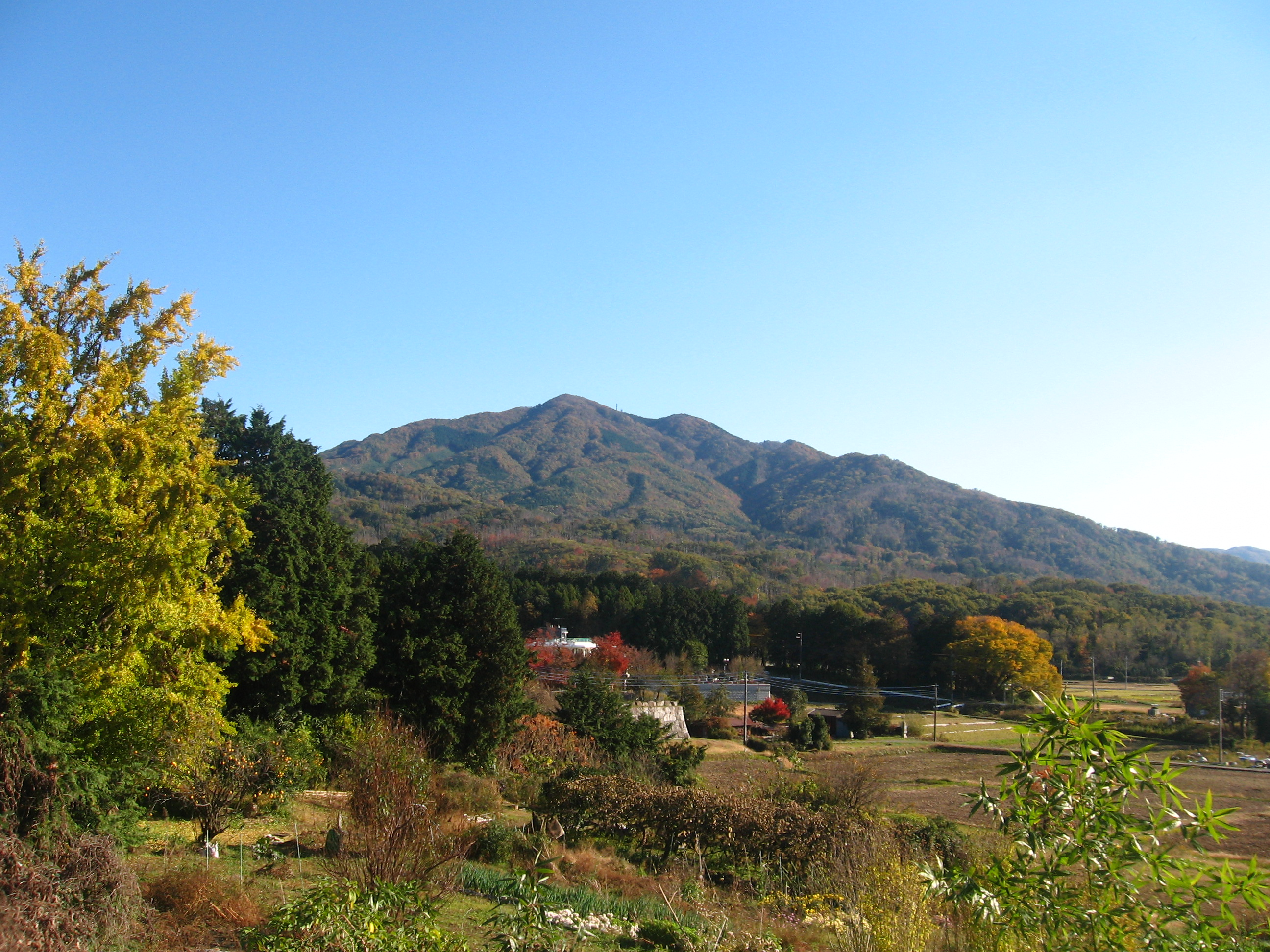
- Mount Kaba

Highest point
- Elevation: 709 m (2,326 ft)

Geography
- Location: Sakuraga & Ishioka, Ibaraki Prefecture, Japan

Geology
- Mountain type: granite

Mount Kaba (加波山, Kaba-san) is a [709 m (2,326 ft)] mountain located within the borders of Suigo-Tsukuba Quasi-National Park, Japan.

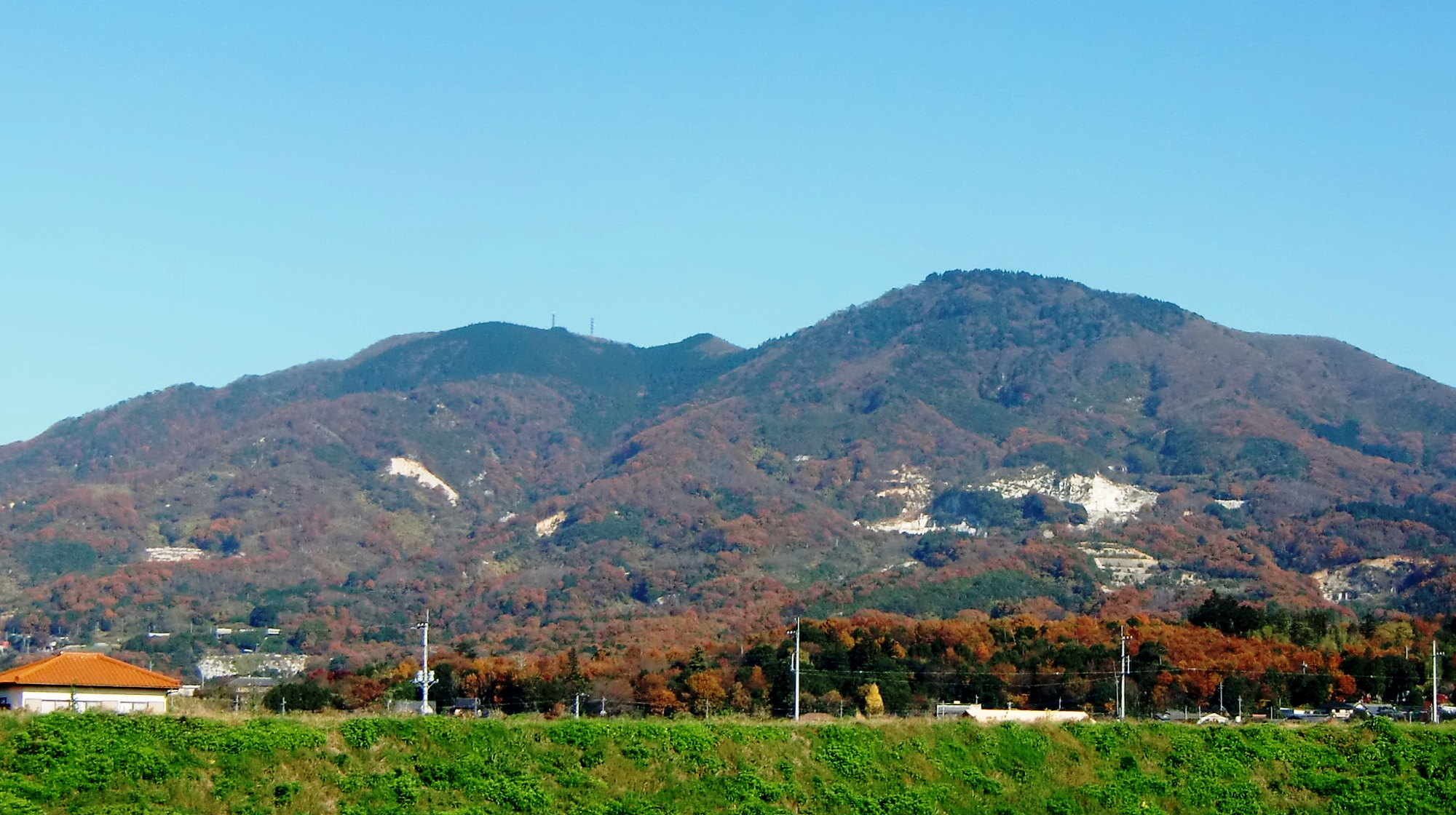
Mt. Enzan (燕山), left & Mt. Kaba (加波山), right. A view from Sakuragawa city.

== Location ==
Mount Kaba is located in the southern part of Ibaraki Prefecture, bordering the cities of Sakuragawa and Ishioka, and north of Mount Tsukuba. The mountain is located in the northwestern part of Suigo-Tsukuba Quasi-National Park and of it.

The mountain is part of the Tsukuba range (筑波山地), which includes Maruyama (丸山) of Sakuragawa, Ontakesan (御嶽山), Amabikiyama (雨引山), Enzan (燕山), Kabasan (加波山), Maruyama (丸山) of Sakuragawa and Ishioka, Ashiozan (足尾山), Kinokayama (きのこ山), Bentensan (弁天山) Tsukubasan (筑波山), Hōkyōsan (宝篋山), among others.

Satellite view: 36°17′50.7″N 140°08′34.3″E

== Attractions ==
The mountain is granite. There are stone quarries, in the center of the western part of Kabasan, Sakuragawa city (old town, Makabe). It is nationally known as a center of stone carvings.

At the summit of the mountain, there is the Haiden of Kaba Shrine; a Shinto shrine.
