= Cape Gyōbumi =

Headland in Asahi, Chiba, Japan

Coordinates: 35°41′32.77″N 140°44′16.02″E

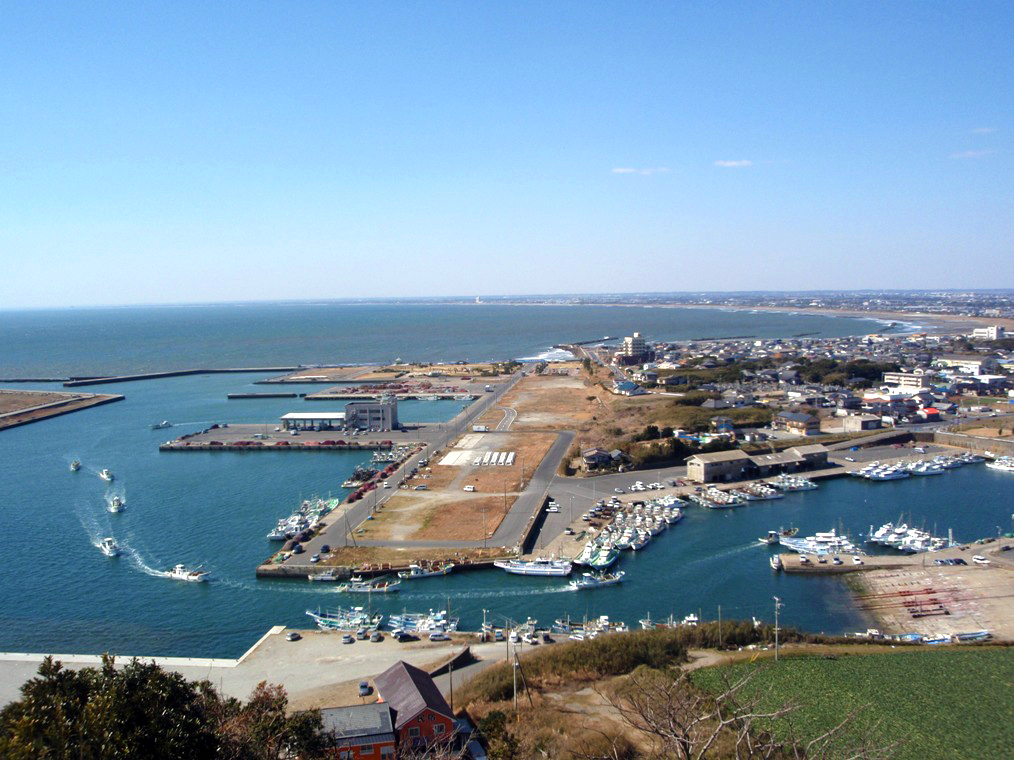
View from Cape Gyōbumi

Cape Gyōbu (刑部岬, Gyōbu-misaki) is a cape on the Pacific Ocean, in the Iioka district of the city of Asahi, Chiba Prefecture, Japan. The cape is located at the very northern point of Kujūkuri Beach on the island of Honshu, and is protected as part of the Suigō-Tsukuba Quasi-National Park.

== Geography ==
Cape Gyōbu is at the northernmost point of Kujūkuri Beach, 66 kilometers from Cape Taitō at its southern end. The cape is located on the southern side of the Chōshi Peninsula at the western end of the Byōbugaura inlet. The cliffs of the cape are primarily composed of sandstone and shale. Marine erosion is severe and continues due to the harshness of waves from the Pacific Ocean off the cape. The primary fishing port of Kujūkuri Beach, Iioka Fishing Port, is located just below the cape. The cape is surrounded by farmland.

== Iioka Lighthouse ==
The Iioka Lighthouse, built in 1956, sits on top of a 40-meter-high (130 ft) cliff on Cape Gyōbu. The white concrete structure stands 9.8 meters high. The lighthouse is visible up to 25 km out to sea. A viewing platform, named "Hikari to Kaze" (meaning "light and wind"), opened in 2001 adjacent to the lighthouse. In winter, weather permitting, Mount Fuji is visible from the cape observatory. The observatory is open year-round.

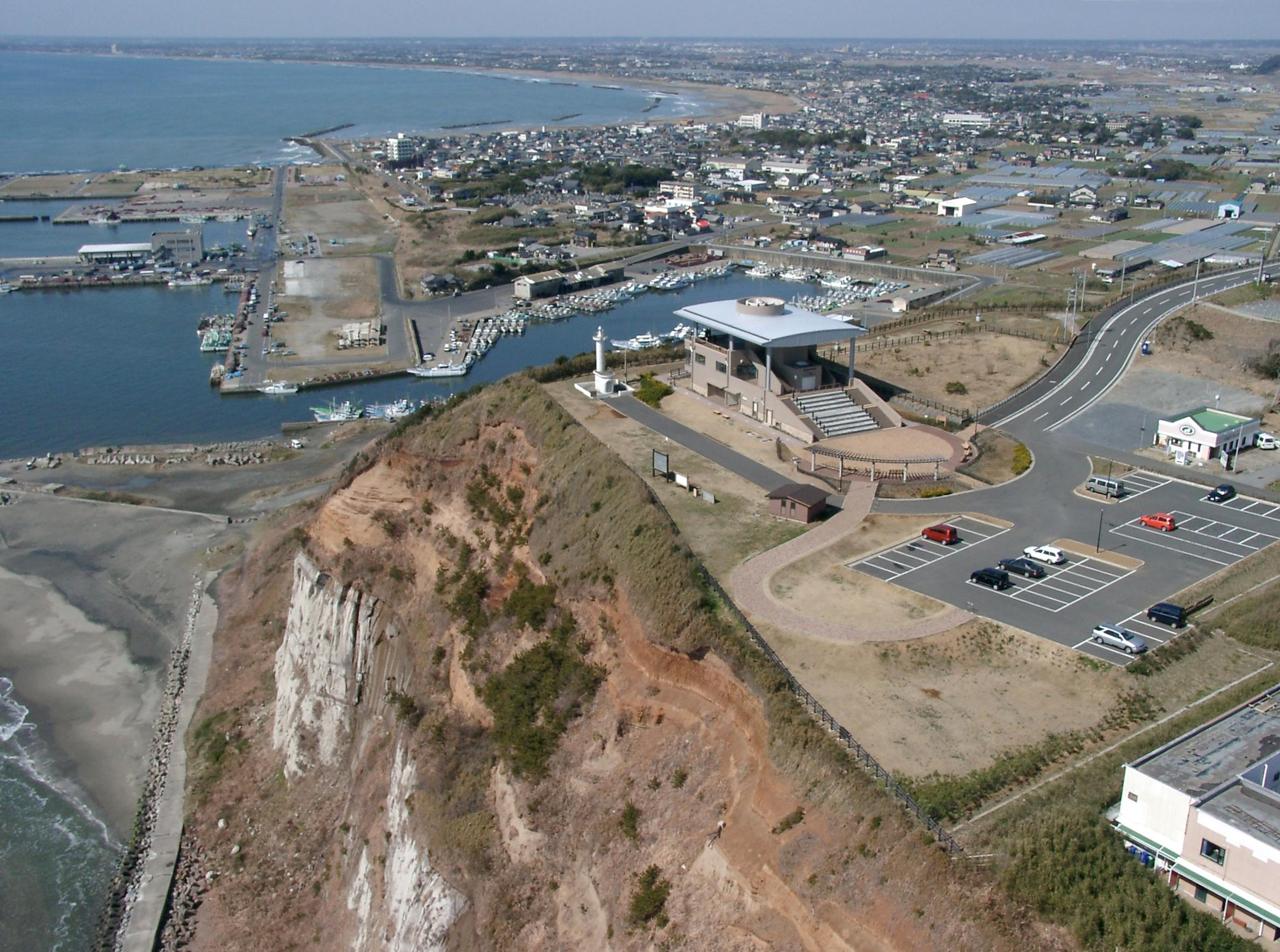
Iioka Lighthouse and "Hikari to Kaze" Observatory

== 2011 Tōhoku earthquake and tsunami ==
The fishing port and buildings at the base of Cape Gyōbu saw major damage as a result of the 2011 Tōhoku earthquake and tsunami. The base of the cape was inundated by a tsunami, and a strong whirlpool developed in the inlet. Numerous ships, vehicles, and structures were damaged around Cape Gyōbu. In all, 7 people died, and 4 people were missing in the Iioka area as a result of the tsunami.

== Cape Gyōbu in Film ==
- Shunji Iwai’s Fireworks, Should We See It from the Side or the Bottom?, 1993
- Takashi Yamazaki's Juvenile, 2000

== Other ==
A stone statue of a character from the manga "Tomorrow's Joe" is located near Cape Gyōbu, an homage to the period when noted manga artist Tetsuya Chiba lived in Iioka.

== Transportation ==
The cape is accessible by bus from the Sōbu Main Line Asahi Station, and is approximately 45 minutes on foot from the station.
