= Suigō-Tsukuba Quasi-National Park =

Quasi-National Park in Kantō, Japan

- 水郷筑波国定公園
- IUCN category V (protected landscape/seascape)
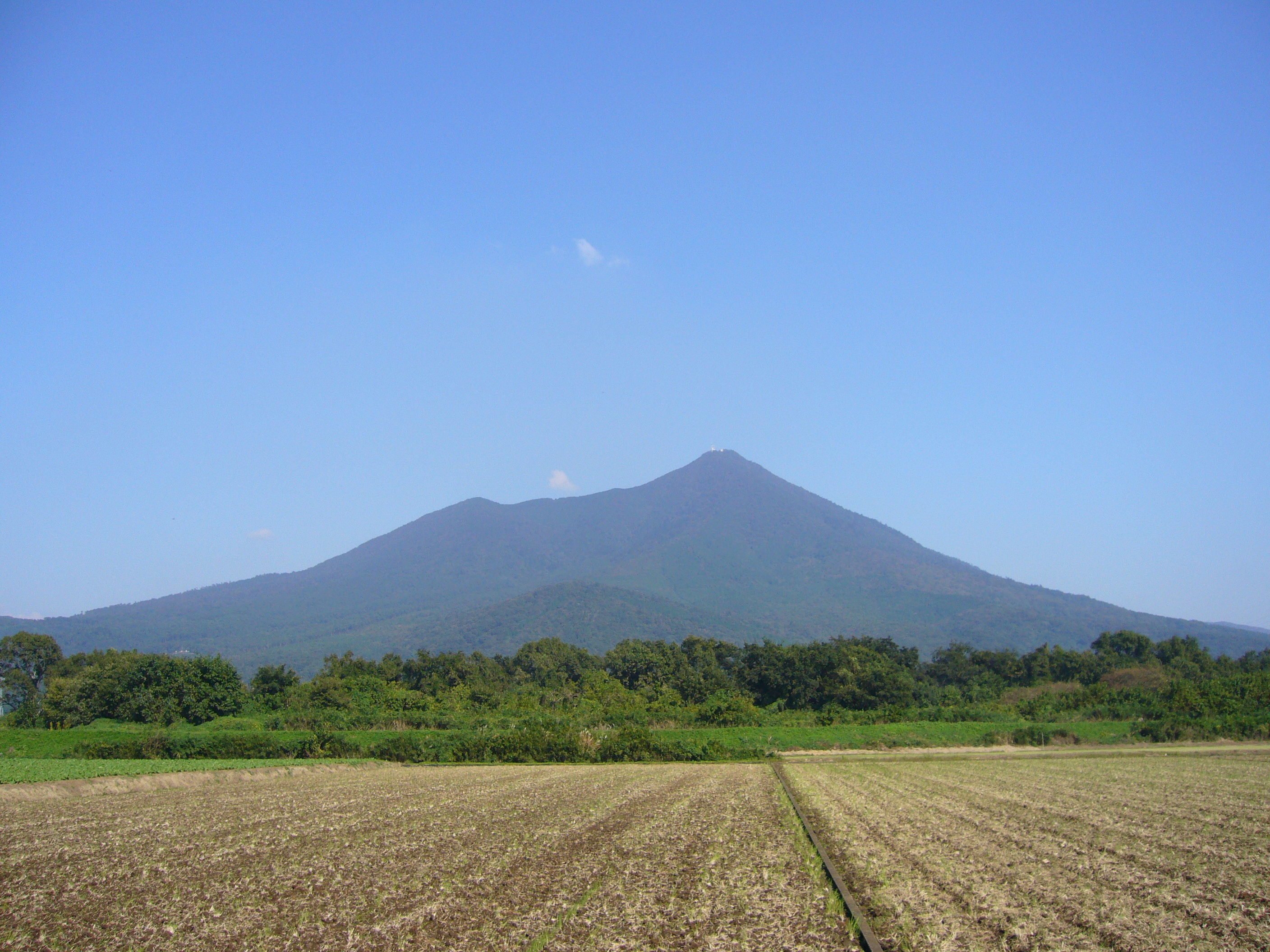
- Mount Tsukuba
- Interactive map of Suigō-Tsukuba Quasi-National Park
- Location: Honshū, Japan
- Coordinates: 35°54′59.70″N 140°31′03.63″E
- Area: 349.56 square kilometres (134.97 mi^{2})
- Established: March 3, 1953
- Governing body: Ibaraki Prefecture and Chiba Prefecture

Suigō-Tsukuba Quasi-National Park (水郷筑波国定公園, Suigō-Tsukuba Kokutei Kōen) is a quasi-national park in the Kantō region of Honshū in Japan. It is rated a protected landscape (category V) according to the IUCN.

== Geography ==
Suigō-Tsukuba Quasi-National Park covers an area in southeast Ibaraki Prefecture and northeast Chiba Prefecture. The park was established on March 3, 1953, to protect natural areas and cultural heritage of Lake Kasumigaura in Ibaraki Prefecture to the north, the Tone River basin on the border of Ibaraki Prefecture and Chiba Prefecture, and the areas around Cape Inubō, Byōbugaura and Cape Gyōbumi in Chiba Prefecture to the south. In 1969 the areas around Mount Tsukuba and Mount Kaba in Ibaraki Prefecture, not adjacent to other areas of the park, were added to Suigō-Tsukuba.

== Administration ==
Like all quasi-national parks in Japan, the park is managed by the local prefectural governments. Suigō-Tsukuba Quasi-National Park, which spans over two prefectures, is jointly administered by Ibaraki and Chiba prefectures.

== Gallery ==
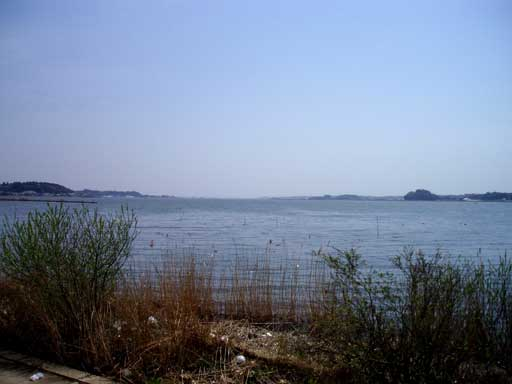
Lake Kasumigaura

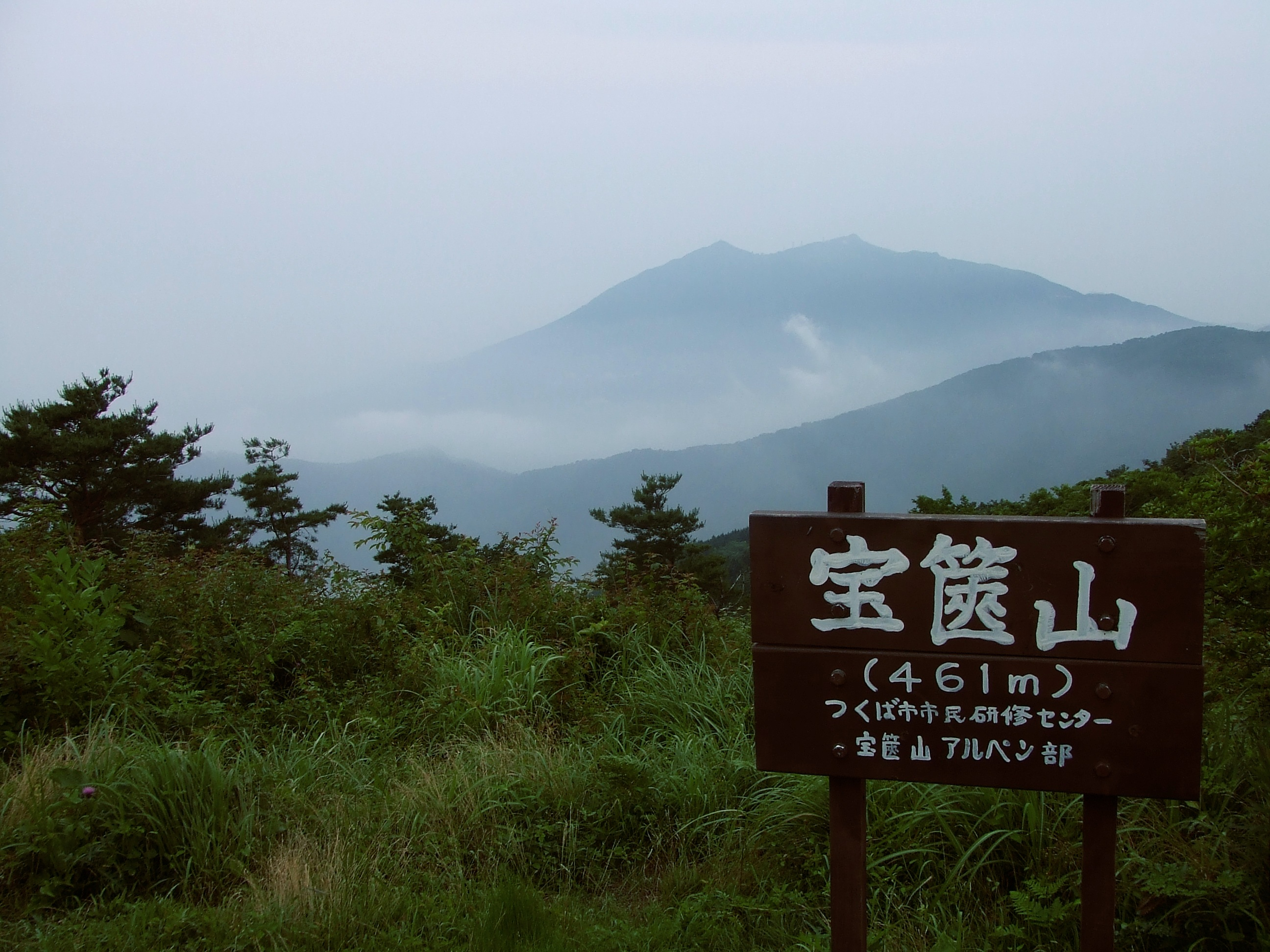
Mount Tsukuba viewed from Mount Hōkyō

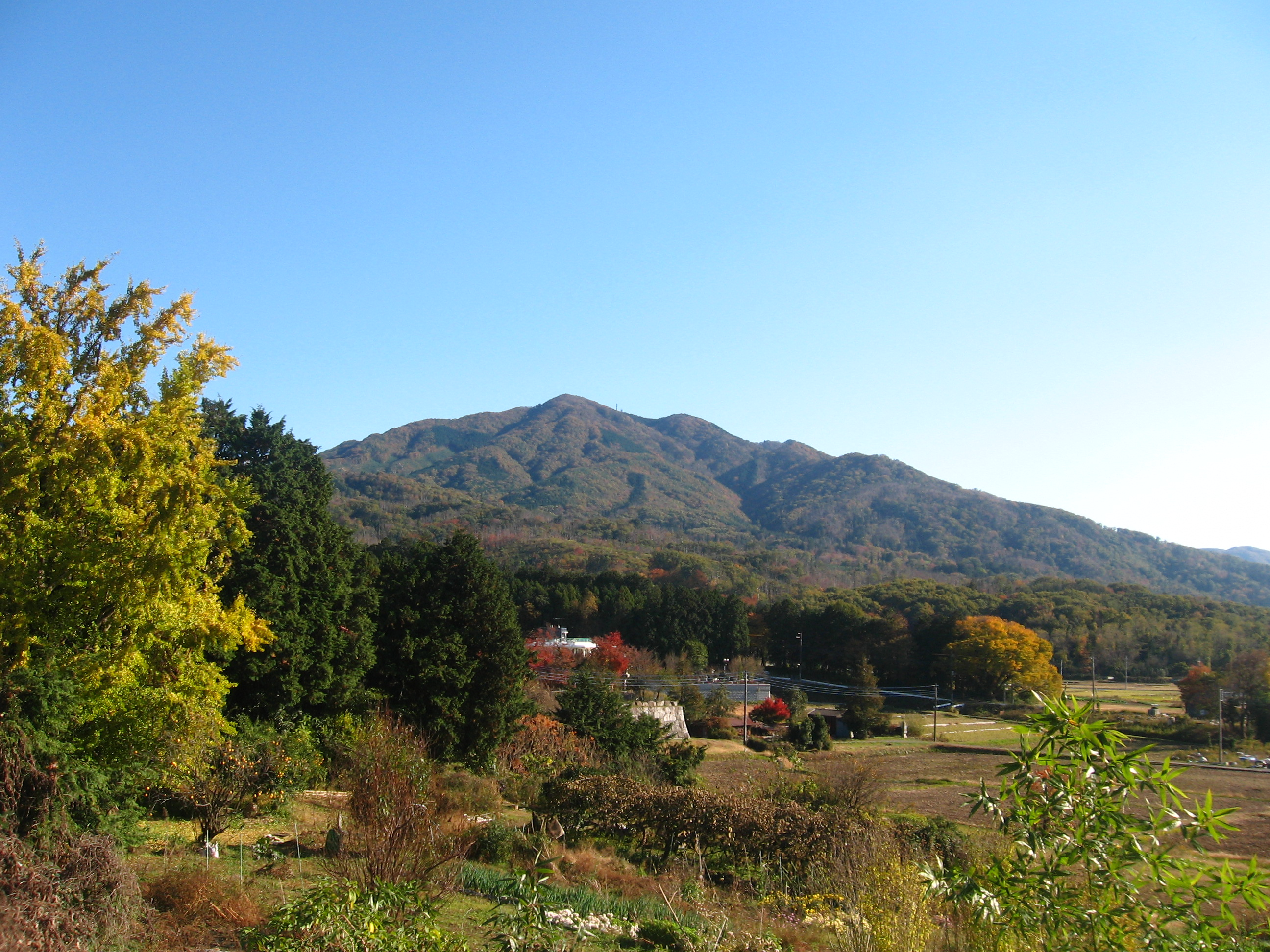
Mount Kaba

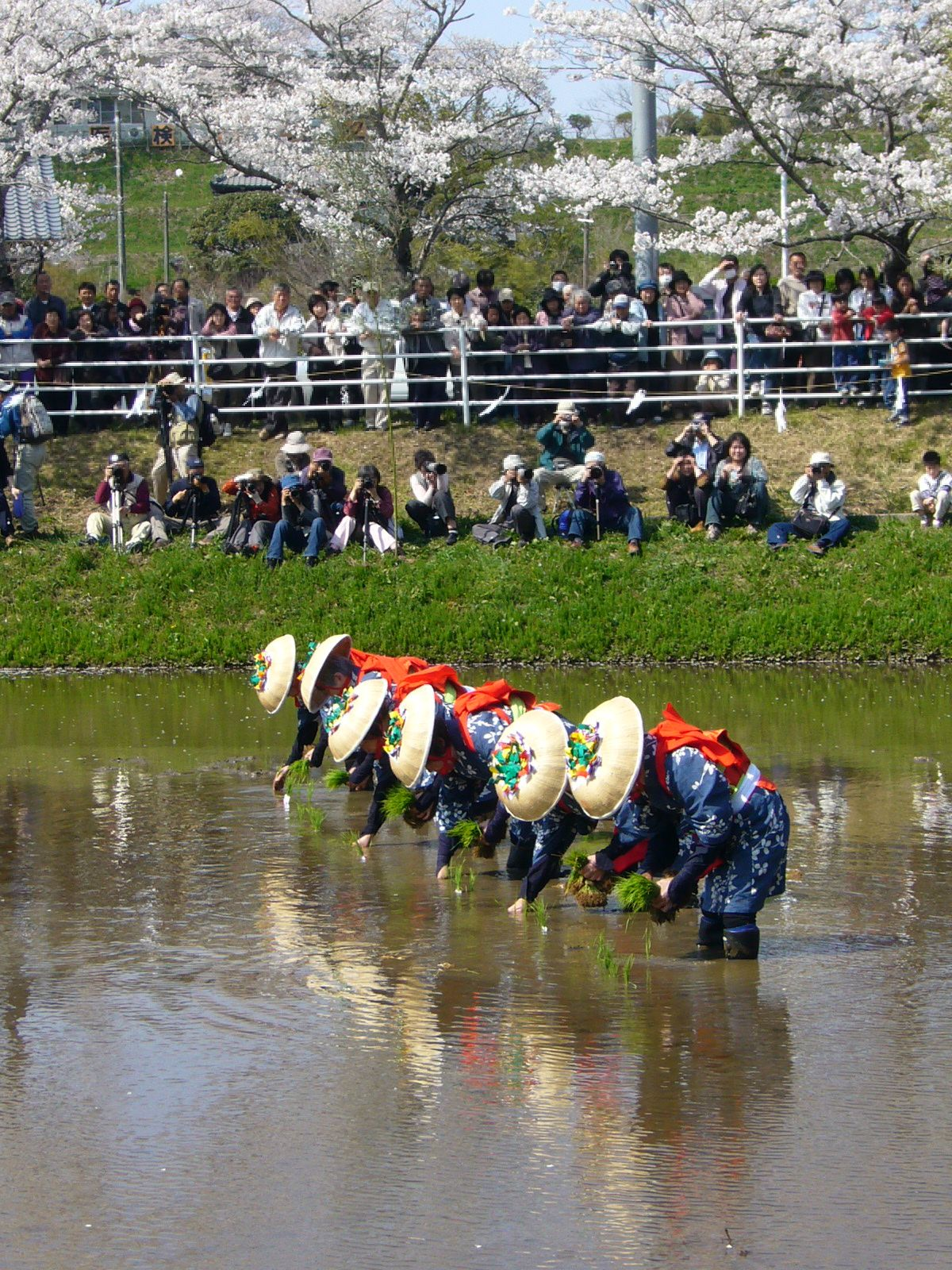
Rice-Transplanting Festival at the Katori Shrine

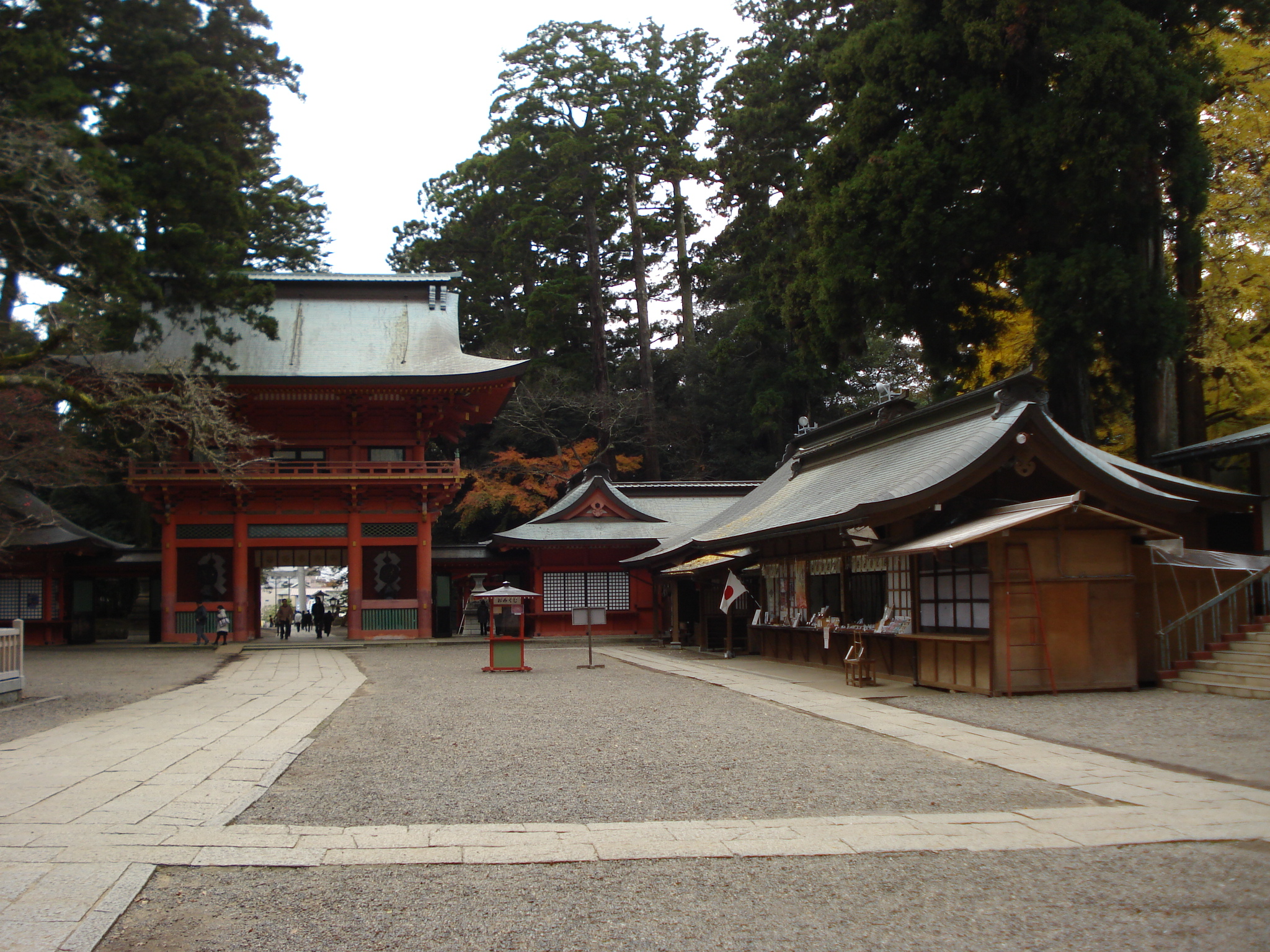
Kashima Shrine

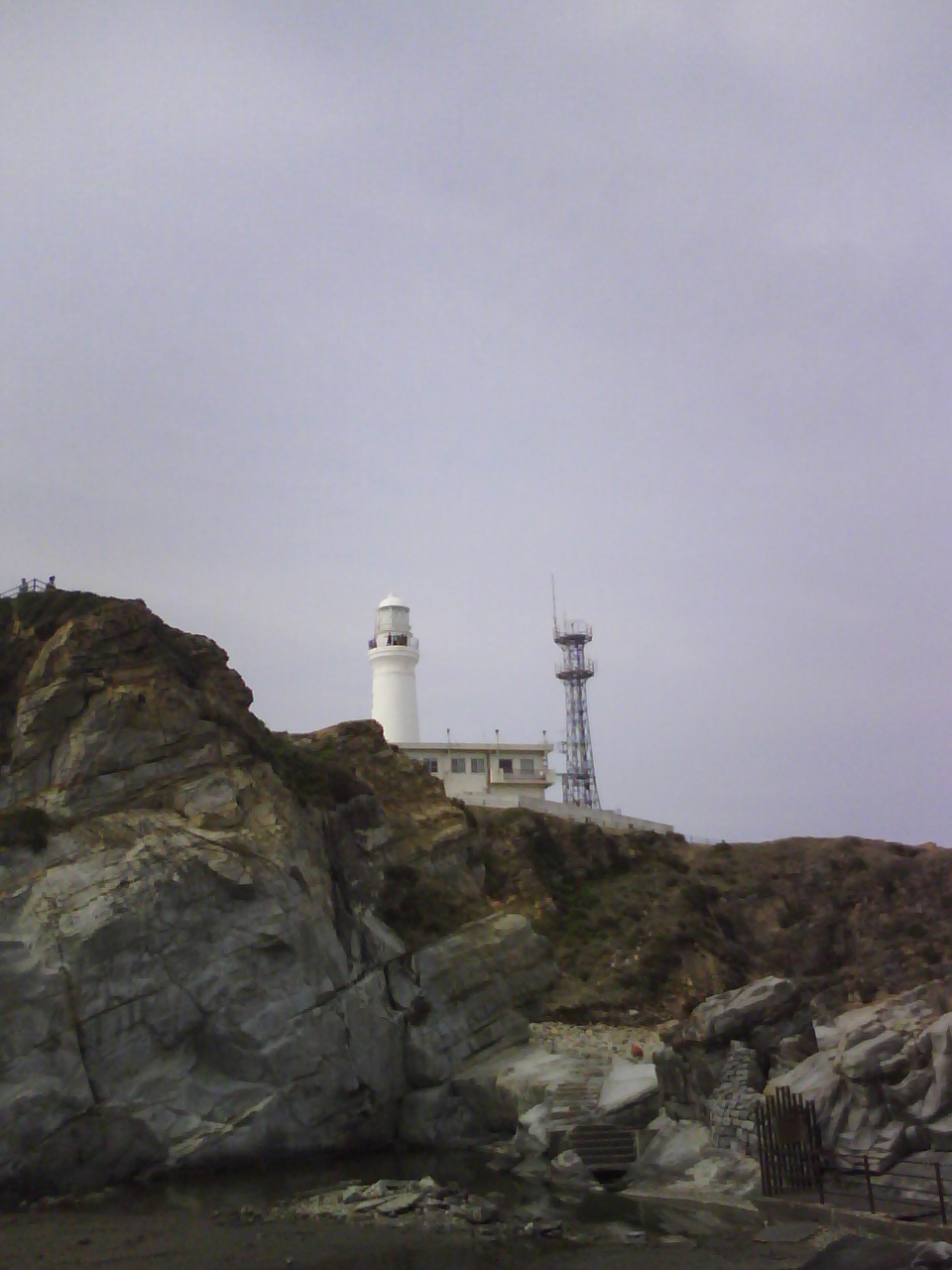
Cape Inubō

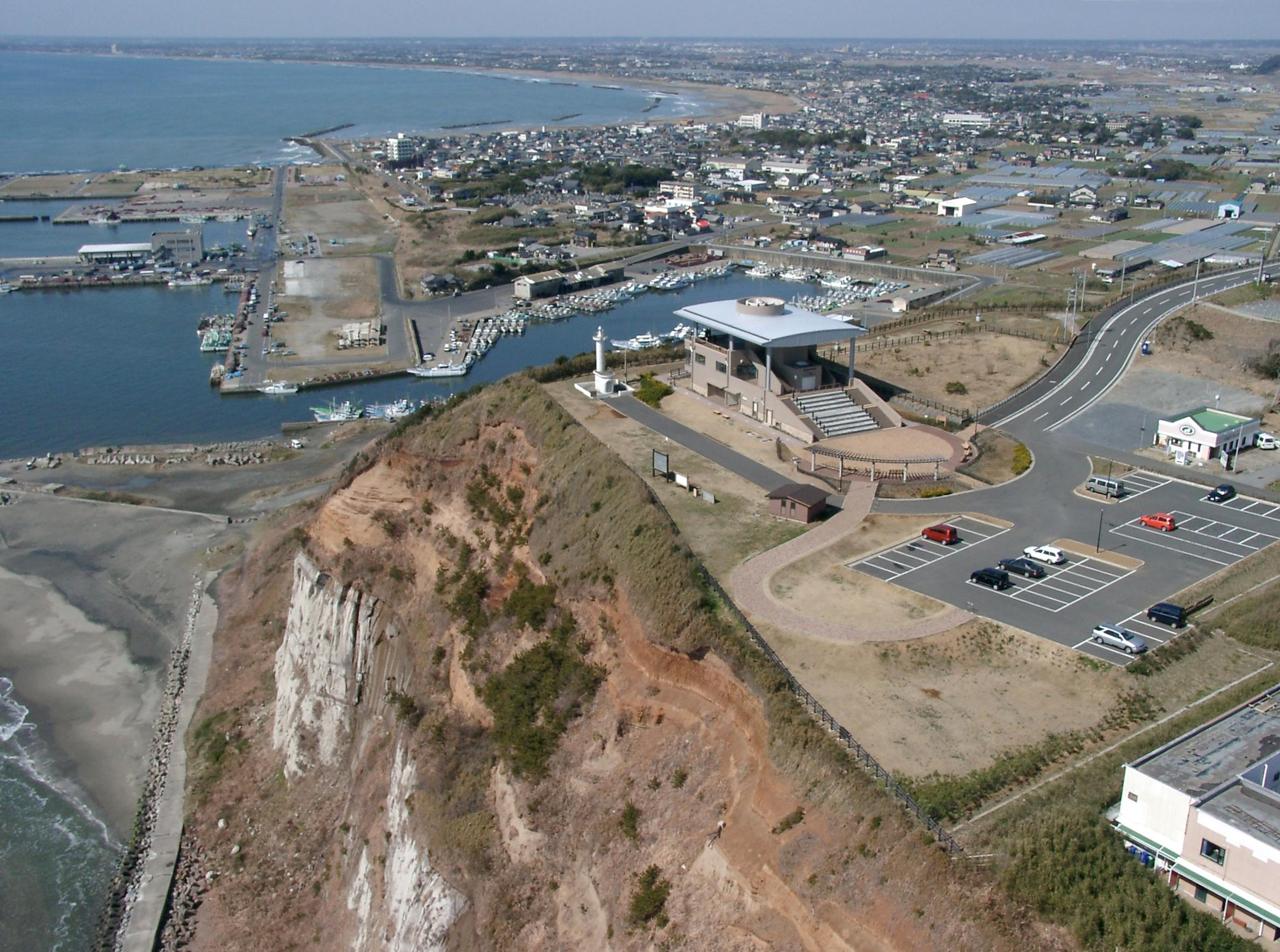
Cape Gyōbumi

== See also ==
- List of national parks of Japan
