= Mount Tsukuba Ropeway =

Japanese aerial lift line in Tsukuba, Ibaraki

Coordinates: 36°13′20″N 140°06′46″E

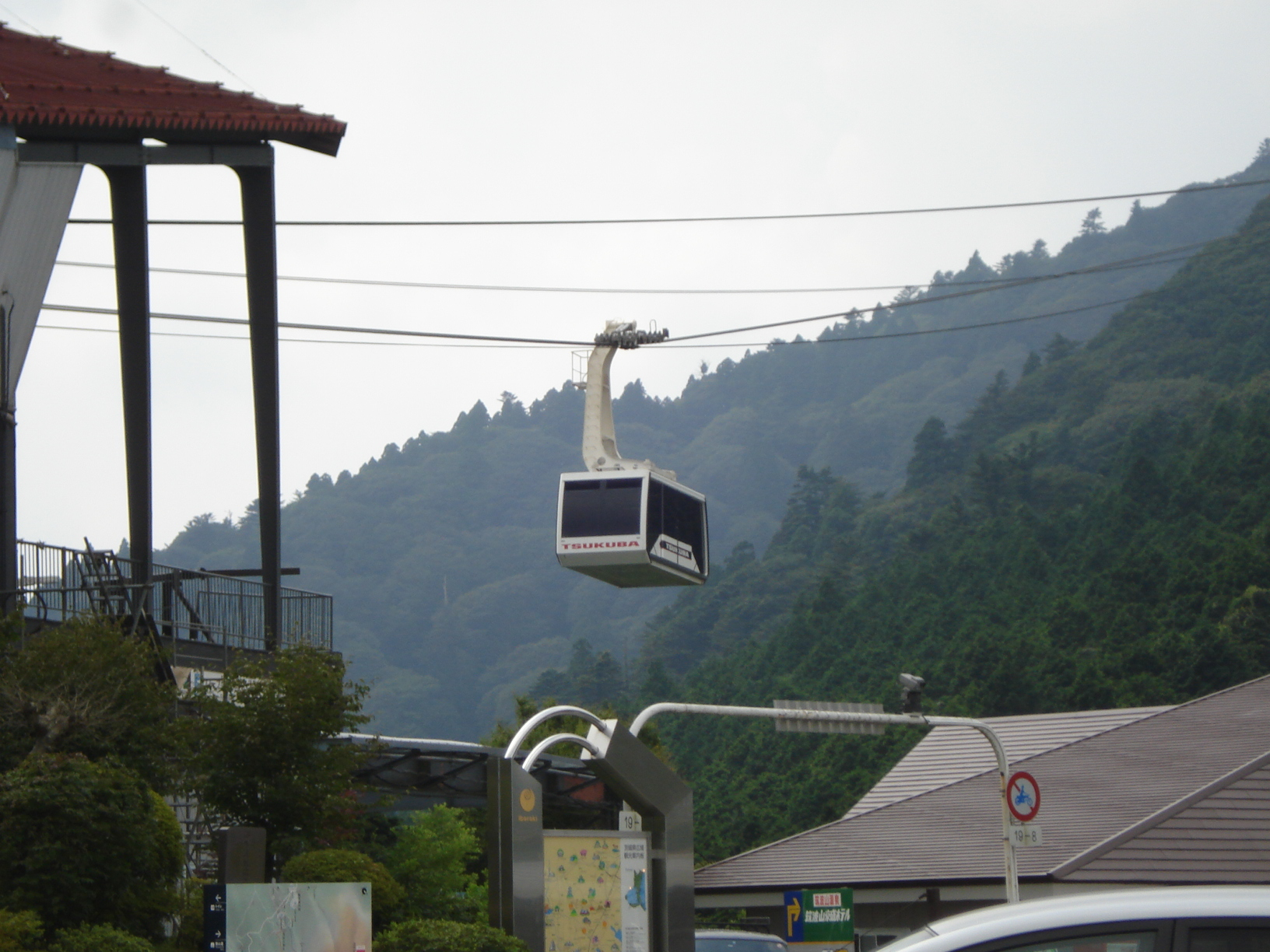
- Interactive map of Mount Tsukuba Ropeway

Overview
- Status: Operational
- Character: Aerial tramway, 2 track cables and 2 haulage ropes
- Location: Mount Tsukuba, Japan
- No. of stations: 2
- Open: 1965

Operation
- Operator: Keisei Electric Railway
- Carrier capacity: 70 Passengers per cabin, 2 cabins
- Trip duration: 6 min

Technical features
- Line length: 1.296 km (0.8 mi)
- Vertical Interval: 298 m (978 ft)

(video) Moving down on Tsukuba Ropeway.

The Mount Tsukuba Ropeway (筑波山ロープウェイ, Tsukubasan Rōpuwei) is a Japanese aerial lift line in Tsukuba, Ibaraki, operated by Tsukuba Kankō Railway (筑波観光鉄道, Tsukuba Kankō Tetsudō; "Tsukuba Sightseeing Railway"). It is the only aerial lift (ropeway) the company operates, while it also operates a funicular line (Mount Tsukuba Cable Car), hotels and restaurants. The company belongs to Keisei Group.

The Swiss-made ropeway, opened in 1965, climbs Mount Tsukuba from Tsutsujigaoka Station to Nyotai-san Station.

== Basic data ==
- Opened: 1965
- Distance: 1.296 kilometres (0.8 mi)
- Vertical interval: 298 m (978 ft)
- Stations: 2
- Speed: 5 m/s (16 ft/s)
- Trip time: 6 minutes

The ropeway tram passes 2 steel towers on the way to the final destination.

== See also ==
- List of aerial lifts in Japan
- Mount Tsukuba Cable Car
