= Mount Tsukuba Cable Car =

Japanese funicular line on Mount Tsukuba, Tsukuba, Ibaraki

Coordinates: 36°13′11″N 140°06′15″E

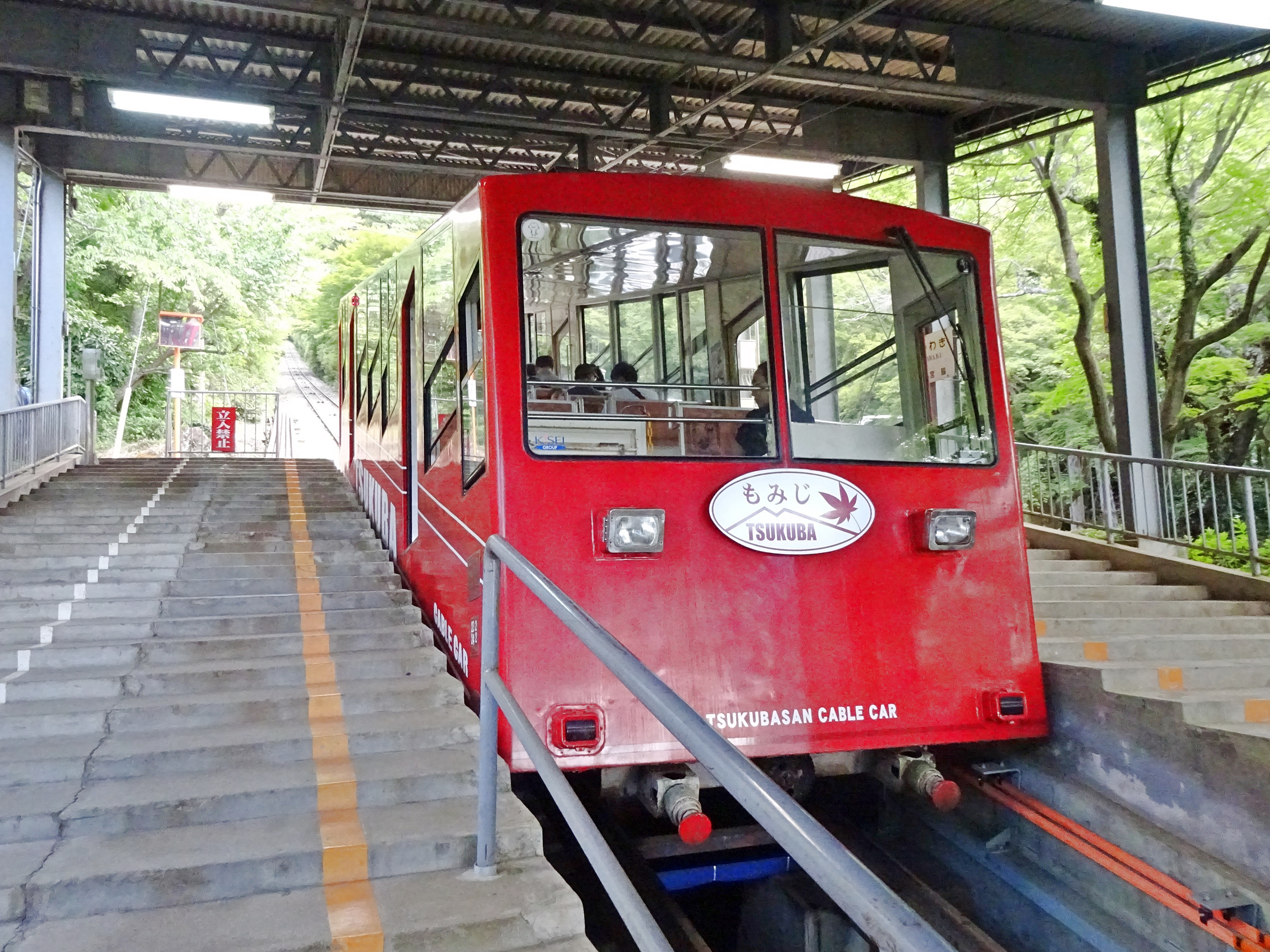
Mt. Tsukuba Cable Car funicular

The Mount Tsukuba Cable Car (筑波山ケーブルカー, Tsukubasan Kēburukā), officially the Mount Tsukuba Cable Railway Line (筑波山鋼索鉄道線, Tsukubasan Kōsaku Tetsudō-sen), is a Japanese funicular line on Mount Tsukuba, Tsukuba, Ibaraki. It is the only funicular line Tsukuba Kankō Railway (筑波観光鉄道, Tsukuba Kankō Tetsudō; "Tsukuba Sightseeing Railway") operates, while it also operates an aerial tramway (Mount Tsukuba Ropeway), hotels and restaurants. The company belongs to Keisei Group.

The line was built in 1925, is the second-oldest cable car line in the Kanto region, and the fifth oldest in Japan.

== Basic data ==
- Built: 1925
- Distance: 1.634 km (1 mi)
- Gauge: 1,067 mm (3 ft 6 in)
- Stations: 2
- Vertical interval: 495 m (1,624 ft)
- Speed: 3.5 m/s (11 ft/s)
- Trip Time: 8 minutes

== See also ==
- List of funicular railways
- List of railway companies in Japan
- List of railway lines in Japan
- Mount Tsukuba Ropeway
