= Cape Inubō =

Cape in Chōshi, Chiba Prefecture, Japan

Coordinates: 35°42′28″N 140°52′10.3″E

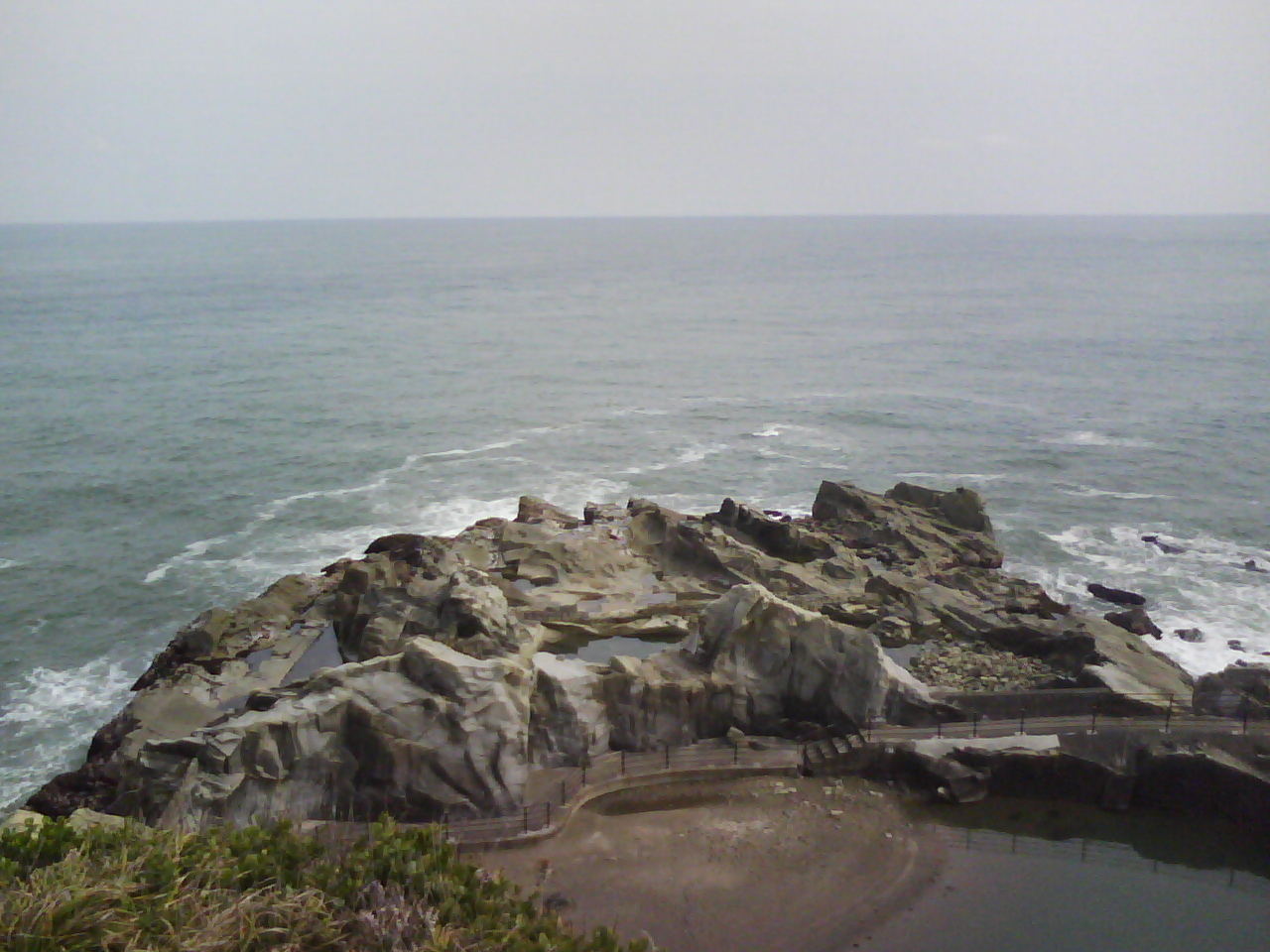
Head of Cape Inubō

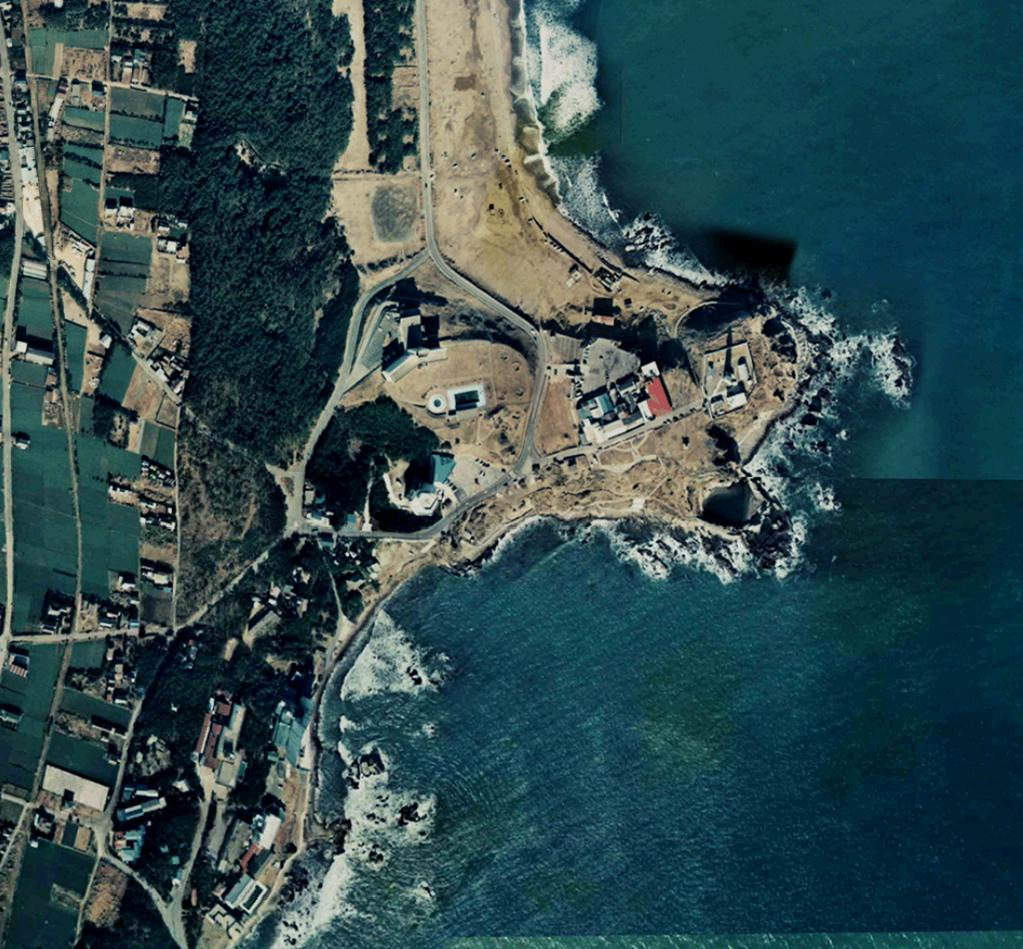
Satellite image of Cape Inubō, 1974

Cape Inubō (犬吠埼, Inubōsaki) is a cape on the Pacific Ocean, in Chōshi, Chiba Prefecture, Japan. The cape is near the midpoint of the Japanese archipelago on the island of Honshū.

== Origin of name ==
The name of the cape is constructed from two Chinese characters, the first (犬) meaning "dog", and the second (吠) meaning "howling". Various traditions exist as to the origin of the name, one being that when Minamoto no Yoshitsune's pet dog Wakamaru was left behind on the peninsula, he howled for seven days and nights. Another explanation is that the region was home to numerous Japanese sea lions, whose barking voice resembles that of a dog. The name may also be of ancient Ainu origin.

== Geography ==
Cape Inubō is technically a small peninsula, but is customarily referred to as a cape. While references exist to the Inubō Peninsula, the name has fallen out of use. An extensive marine cave exists in the reef areas under the lighthouse. The cape forms the easternmost point in Chiba Prefecture, close to the mouth of the Tone River. It is part of Suigo-Tsukuba Quasi-National Park.

== Inubōsaki Lighthouse ==
Cape Inubō is noted for its Inubōsaki Lighthouse, built in 1874. It is notable as one of the few lighthouses whose original lens was a first order Fresnel lens, the strongest type of Fresnel lens. It is a Registered Tangible Cultural Property of Japan.

== In popular culture ==
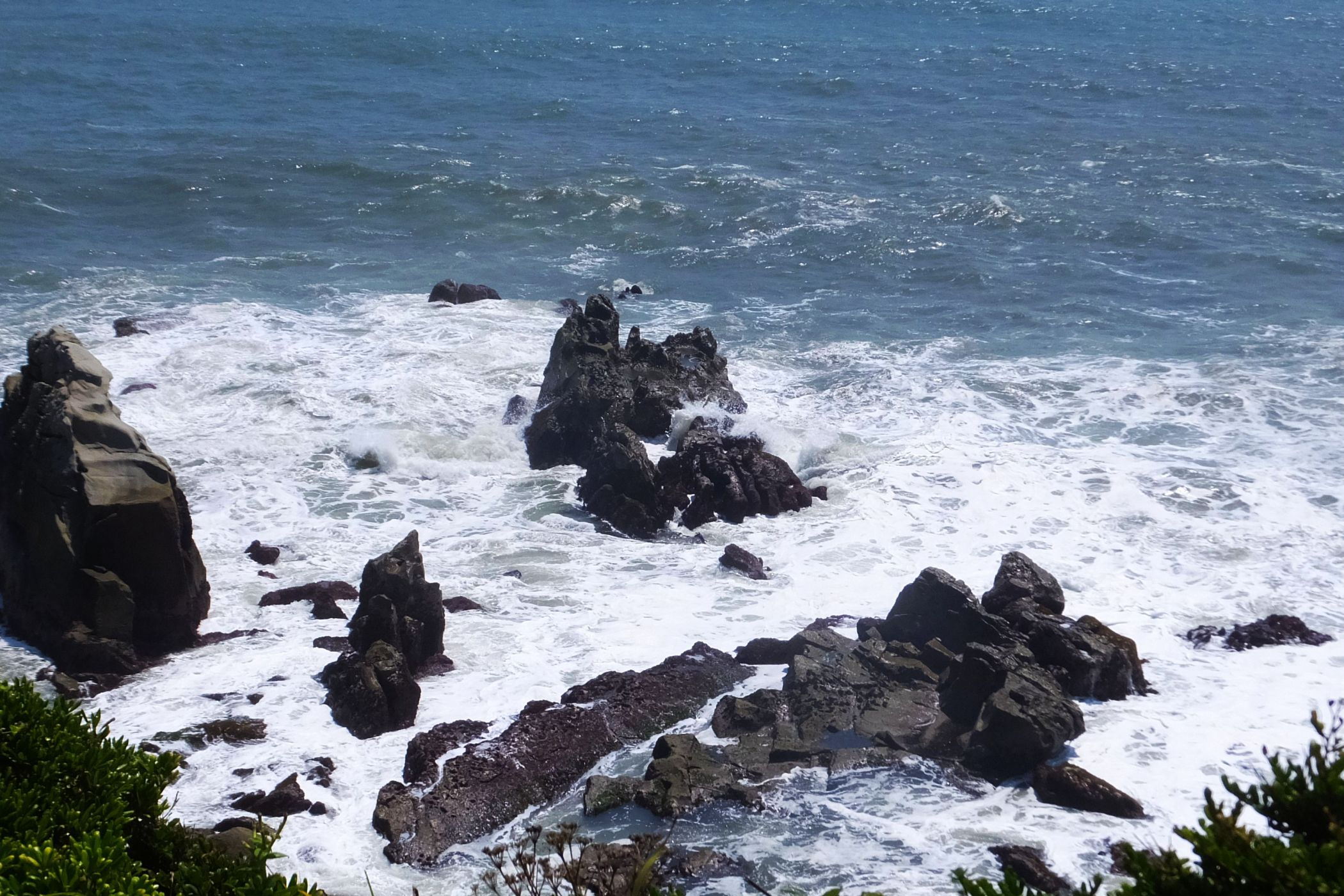
The rocks at Cape Inubo that are seen in the Toei Company's logo

Cape Inubō is mentioned in numerous literary works. Markers related to the poems of Shōwa period author Kyoshi Takahama (1874 – 1959) and Naturalist tanka poet Bokusui Wakayama (1885 – 1928) are on the cape.

Since 1958, the opening logo for Toei Company films features waves crashing over three rocks near Cape Inubō. As a homage to this, the 45th Super Sentai series, Kikai Sentai Zenkaiger, features this particular shot of Cape Inubō in the background whenever Zenkaiser uses the Zenryoku Zenkai Cannon's main attack.

== Transport ==
The cape is 10 minutes by foot from the Inuboh Station of the Chōshi Electric Railway Line, or 20 minutes by bus from the JR East Chōshi Station.

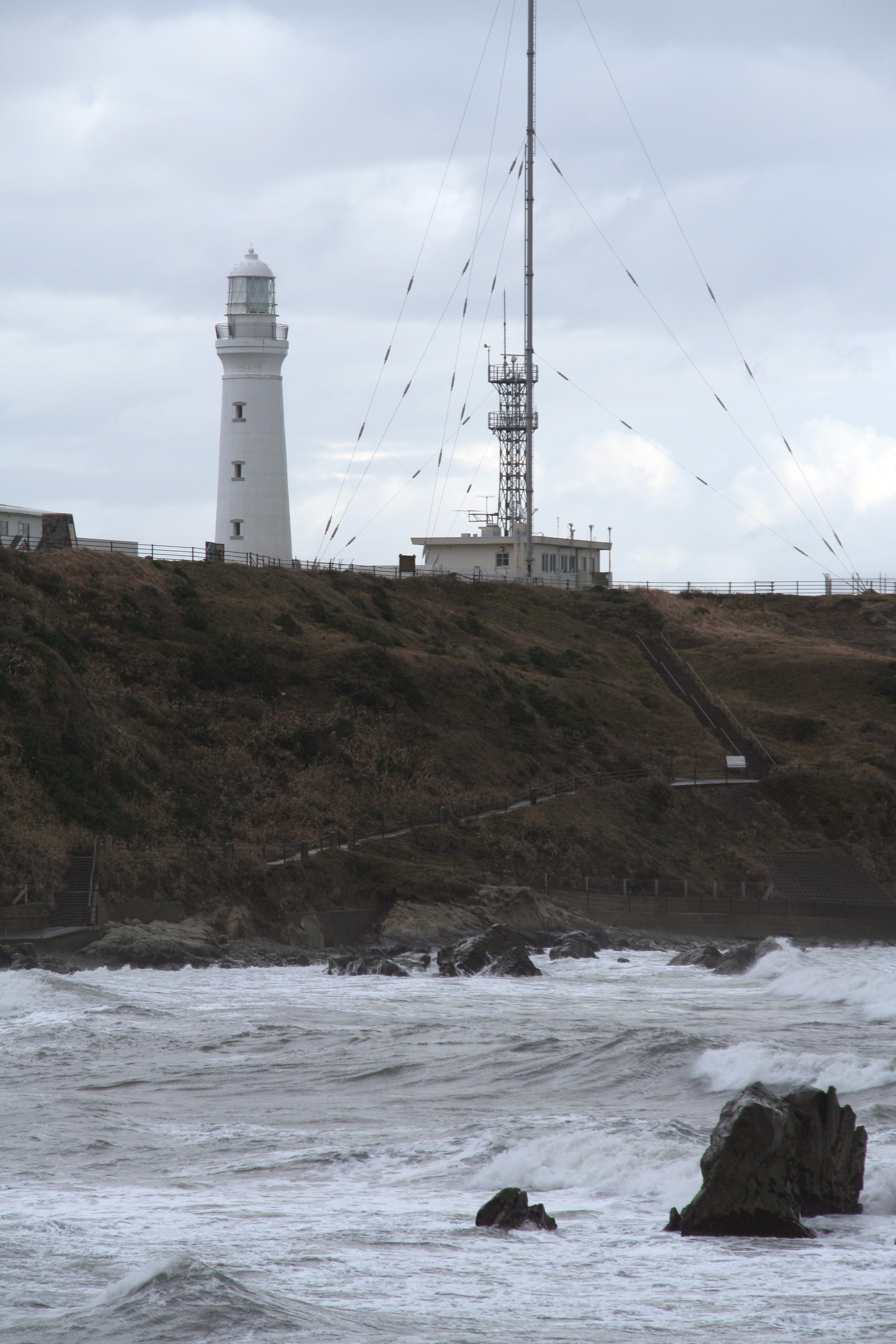
Inubōsaki Lighthouse

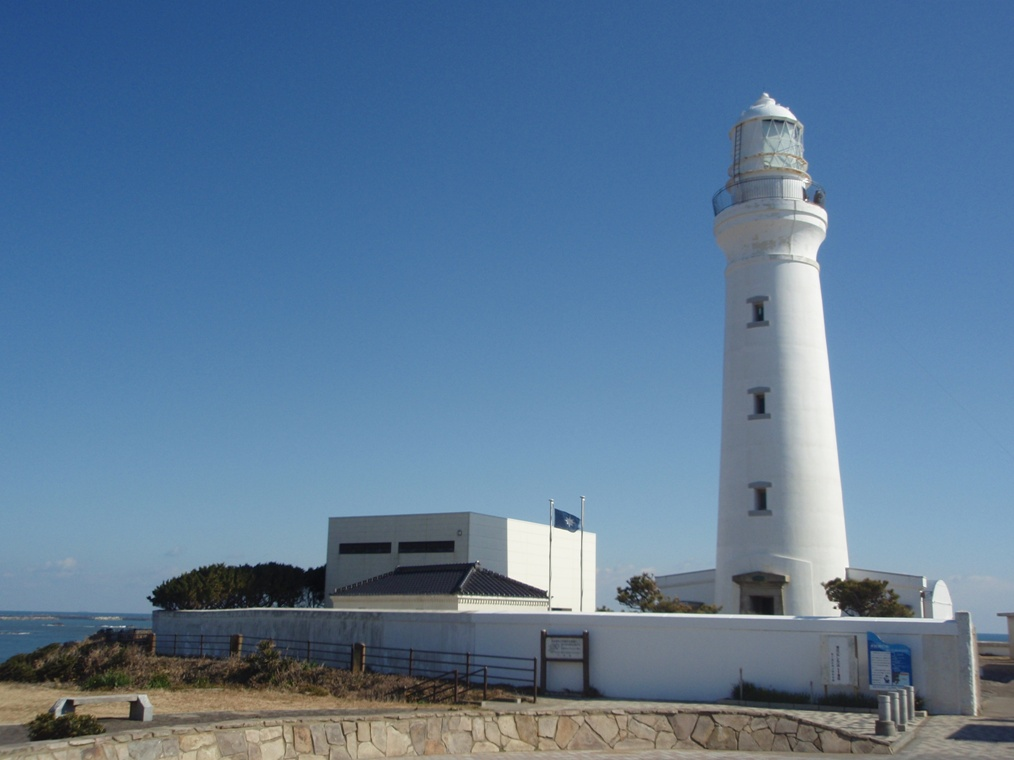
Inubōsaki Lighthouse

== Sources ==
- "Inubōzaki". Encyclopedia of Japan. Tokyo: Netto Adobansusha. 2011. Archived from the original on 2007-08-25.
