= Mount Tsukuba =

Mountain in Tsukuba, Ibaraki Prefecture, Japan

- 筑波山
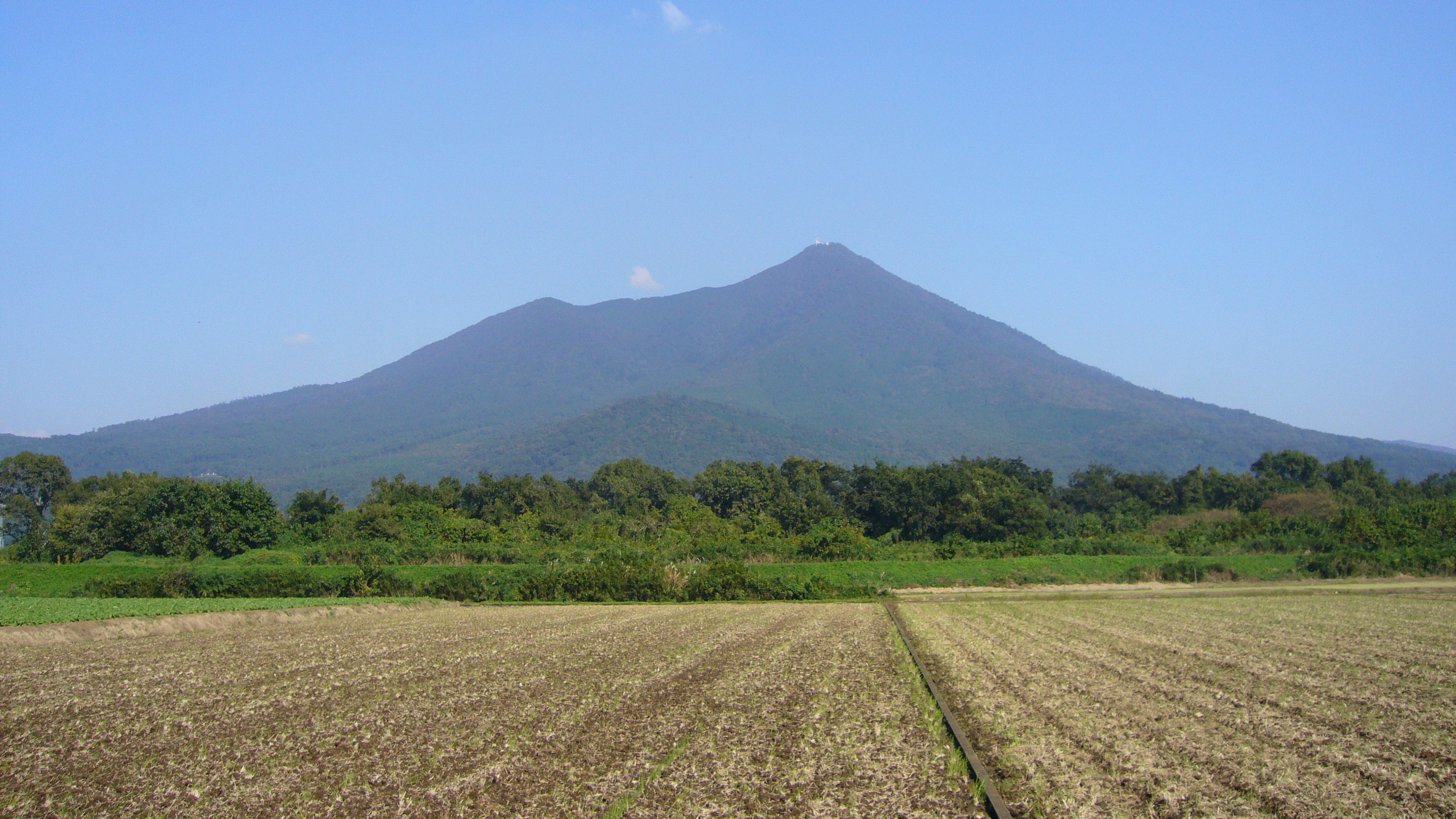
- Seen from the WSW. Taken from Chikusei

Highest point
- Elevation: 877 m (2,877 ft)
- Listing: 100 famous mountains in Japan
- Coordinates: 36°13.31′N 140°06.24′E

Geography
- Location within Japan
- Location: Tsukuba, Ibaraki, Japan
- Parent range: Yamizo Mountains

Geology
- Mountain type(s): granite, gabbro

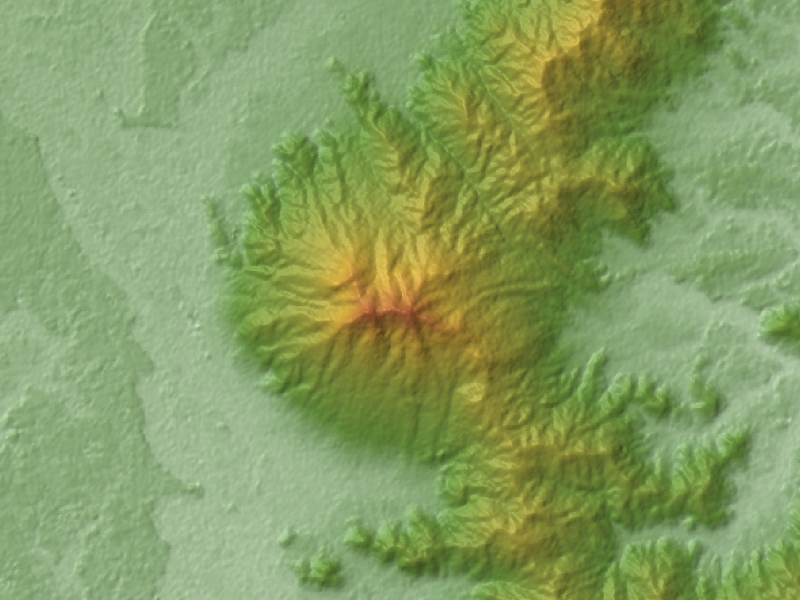
Topographic map

Mount Tsukuba (筑波山, Tsukuba-san) is an 877 m (2,877 ft) mountain located at the northern-end of Tsukuba, Japan. It is one of the most famous mountains in Japan, particularly well known for its double peaks, Nyotai-san (女体山; lit. "female body") 877 m (2,877 ft) and Nantai-san (男体山; lit. "male body") 871 m (2,858 ft). Many people climb the so-called "purple mountain" every year for the panoramic view of the Kantō plain from the summit. On clear days the Tōkyō skyline, Lake Kasumigaura, and even Mount Fuji are visible from the summit. Japanese mountains are mostly volcanic, but Mount Tsukuba is non-volcanic granite and gabbro in origin. Renowned beautiful granites are produced in the northern quarries even today.

Tacrolimus, an immunosuppressive drug used for organ transplants, was first disovered in a soil bacterium named after the mountain, Streptomyces tsukubensis. The name tacrolimus itself is derived from "Tsukuba macrolide immunosuppressant".

== Etymology ==
The Fudoki of Hitachi Province (常陸国風土記, Hitachi no kuni Fudoki), a national geography completed in 721 AD, says Mount Tsukuba was named after a noble called Tsukuha no Mikoto (筑箪命). According to this account, the area around Mount Tsukuba was once called Ki no kuni (紀国). Under the reign of Mimaki no Sumeramikoto (美麻貴天皇) (Emperor Sujin), Tsukuha no Mikoto from the Uneme clan (采女氏) was appointed as its governor. He had a strong desire to leave his name in history, so he renamed the area "Tsukuha", which is now pronounced Tsukuba.

== History ==
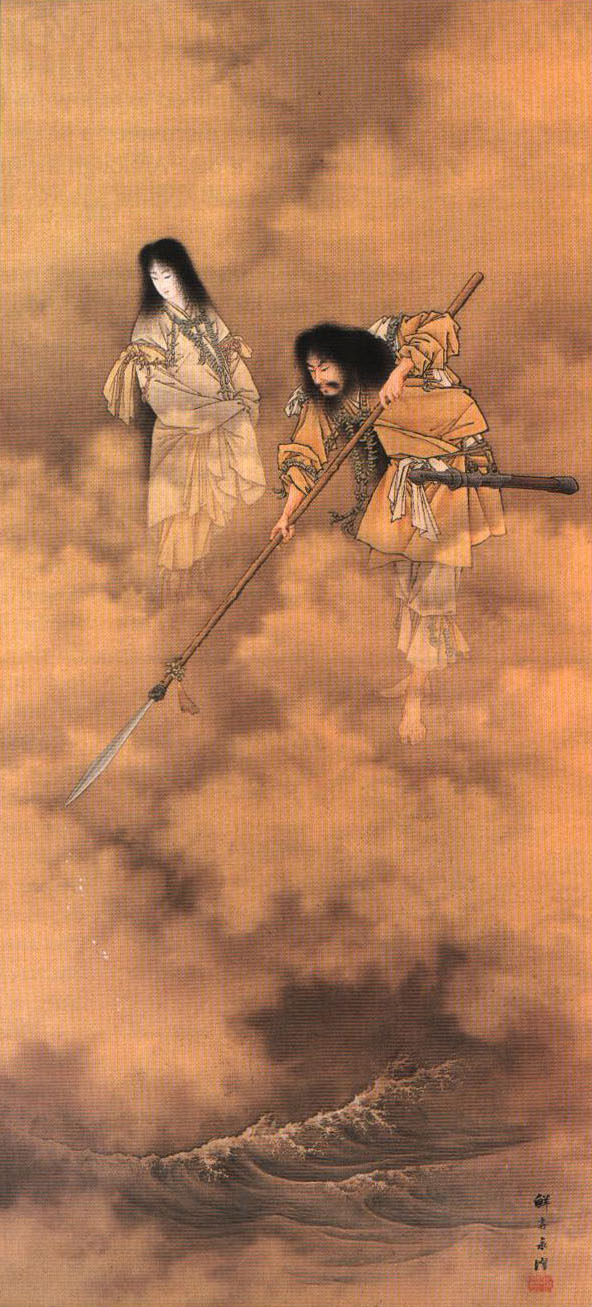
Izanami and Izanagi.

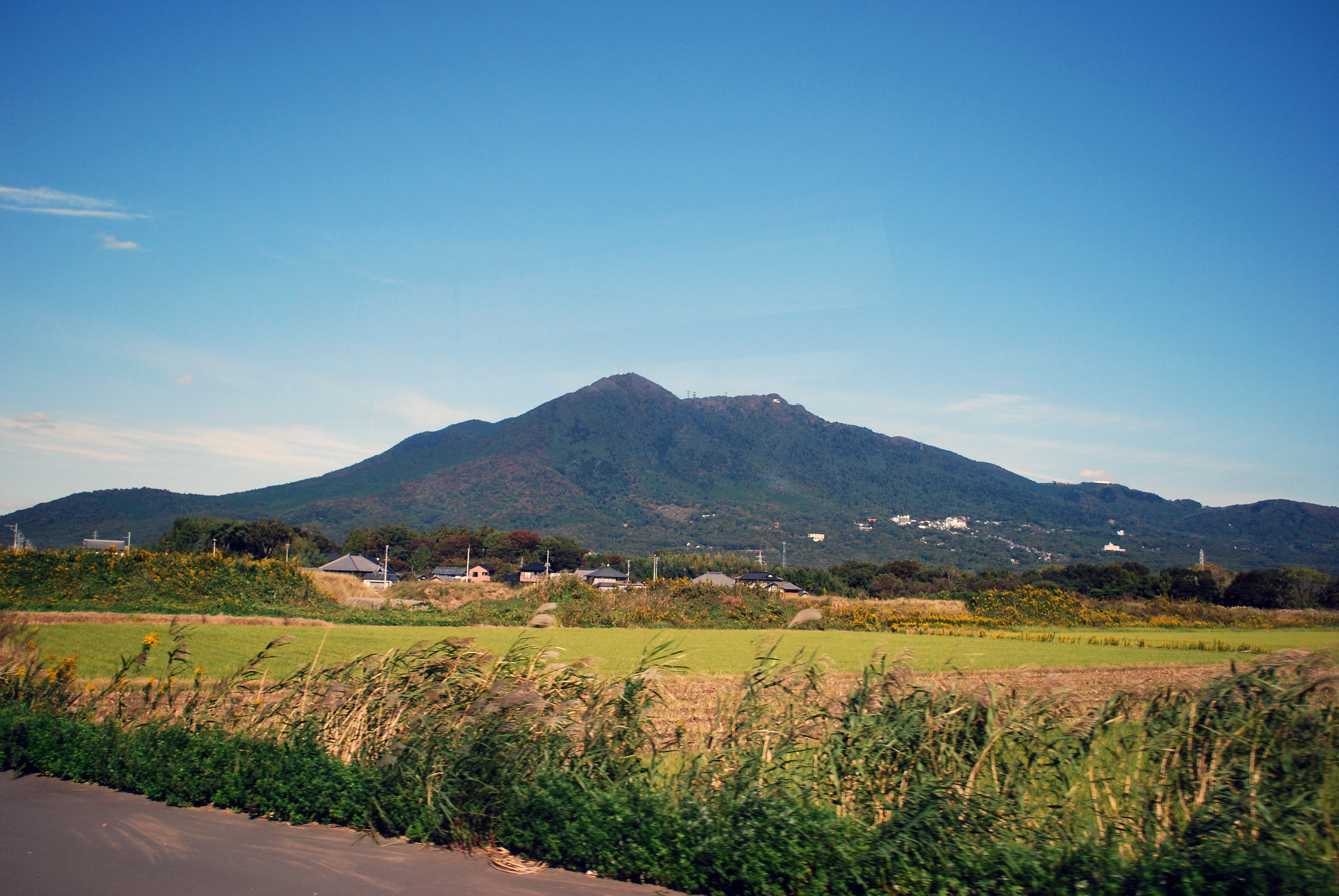
Double peaks are viewed from the southwest.

According to legend, a deity descended from the heavens and asked Mount Fuji and Mount Tsukuba for shelter. Mount Fuji refused, while Mount Tsukuba welcomed the deity and offered food and water. The legend attributes Mount Fuji's comparatively barren landscape and Mount's Tsukuba's vegetation to their differing responses to the deity.

Ancient chronicles say that the sacred progenitors of the Japanese race are enshrined here, the male divinity, Izanagi-no-Mikoto, at Mt. Nantai, and the female divinity, Izanami-no-Mikoto, at Mt. Nyotai. Legends say that the two deities wed and gave birth to other deities, and even to Japan herself.

In antiquity Mt. Nyotai served as location for kagai — harvest festivals associated with fertility — allowing people to participate in the mountains' marriage and promoting marriage between people. A poem by Takahashi no Mushimaro in the anthology Man'yōshū implies that these festivals also permitted adultery:

「鷲住 筑波乃山之 裳羽服津乃 其津乃上尓 率而 未通女壮士之 徃集 加賀布嬥歌尓 他妻尓 吾毛交牟 吾妻尓 他毛言問 此山乎 牛掃神之 従来 不禁行事叙 今日耳者 目串毛勿見 事毛咎莫」

“Washi no sumu / Tsukuha no yama no / Mohakitsu no / sono tsu no ue ni / adomohite / wotome wotoko no / yukitsudohi / kagafu kagahi ni / hitozuma ni / ware mo majiramu / waga tsuma ni / hito mo kototohe / kono yama wo / ushihaku kami no / mukashi yori / isamenu waza zo / kefu nomi ha / megushi mo na miso / koto mo togamu na”

“On the Mountain of Tsukuba / Where the eagles dwell / Near the Wells of Mohakitsu, / Seeking each other, in song of Kagai, / I will seek the wives of other men / And let other men woo my own. / The gods dwelling in these mountains / Have allowed this / Since olden times; / Do not make exception today / And do not reproach the lovers / And blame them not.”

The Imperial Japanese Navy used the "Go" signal — NIITAKAYAMANOBORE 1208 (ニイタカヤマノボレ一二○八 [Kanji: 新高山登れ一二○八]), meaning "Climb Mount Niitaka 1208"—to begin the surprise attack against the USN Pacific Fleet and its base at Pearl Harbor, Hawaii, on 7 December 1941 (8 December [1208] in Japanese calendar). On the other hand, the "No Go" signal used the mountain's name, if needed, would be TSUKUBAYAMAHARE (ツクバヤマハレ [Kanji: 筑波山晴れ]), meaning "Mount Tsukuba is sunny".

== Industry ==
Located at an elevation of approximately 140 meters, Mount Tsukuba is a site for the cultivation of mandarin oranges. Various varieties, including Unshu mikan and Natsumikan, are grown in this region. Notably, the cultivation of a native species called "Tsukuba mikan" or "Fukuremikan" is prevalent. This indigenous mandarin is small-sized, with a diameter ranging from 2 to 3 cm, and is characterized by a thin peel and large seeds.

Considered the sole native species of mandarin oranges in Japan, the Tsukuba mikan belongs to the Rutaceae family and has historical roots, with mentions dating back to the "Hitachi Fudoki."

The successful cultivation of mandarin oranges on Mount Tsukuba is attributed to the presence of a "thermal belt" on the mountain slope. This thermal belt experiences higher temperatures compared to the foothills, especially during the cold winter months. In the elevation range of 170-270 meters on Mount Tsukuba, the thermal belt maintains temperatures 3-4 °C higher than the foothills, creating favorable conditions for mandarin orange cultivation. This phenomenon has allowed for the appearance of tourist-oriented mandarin orchards since the 1980s.

A similar utilization of a thermal belt for agriculture is observed in Shizuoka Prefecture, where tea cultivation takes advantage of comparable conditions.

== Attractions ==
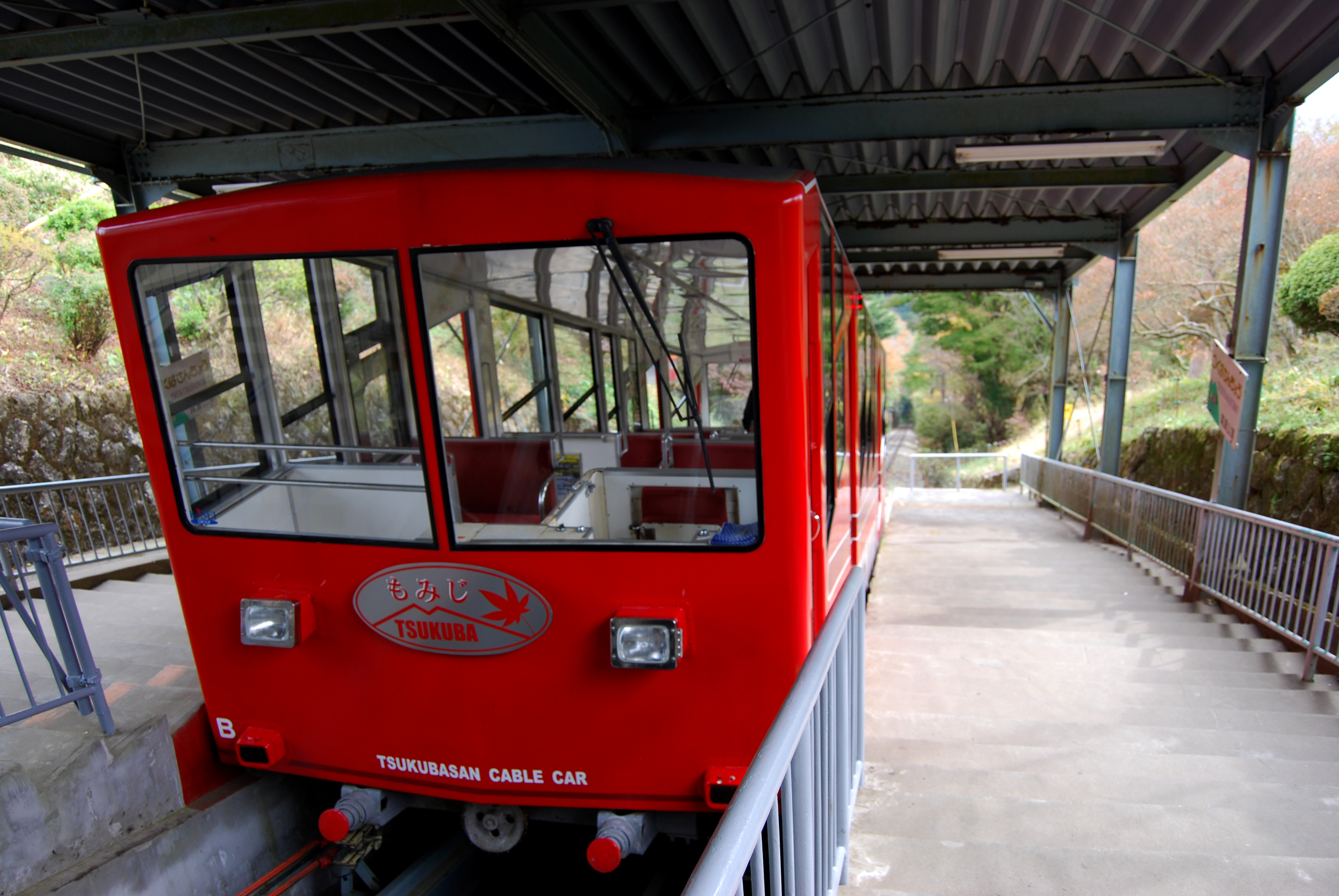
Mount Tsukuba Cable Car, funiculars connect the foothill and the top.

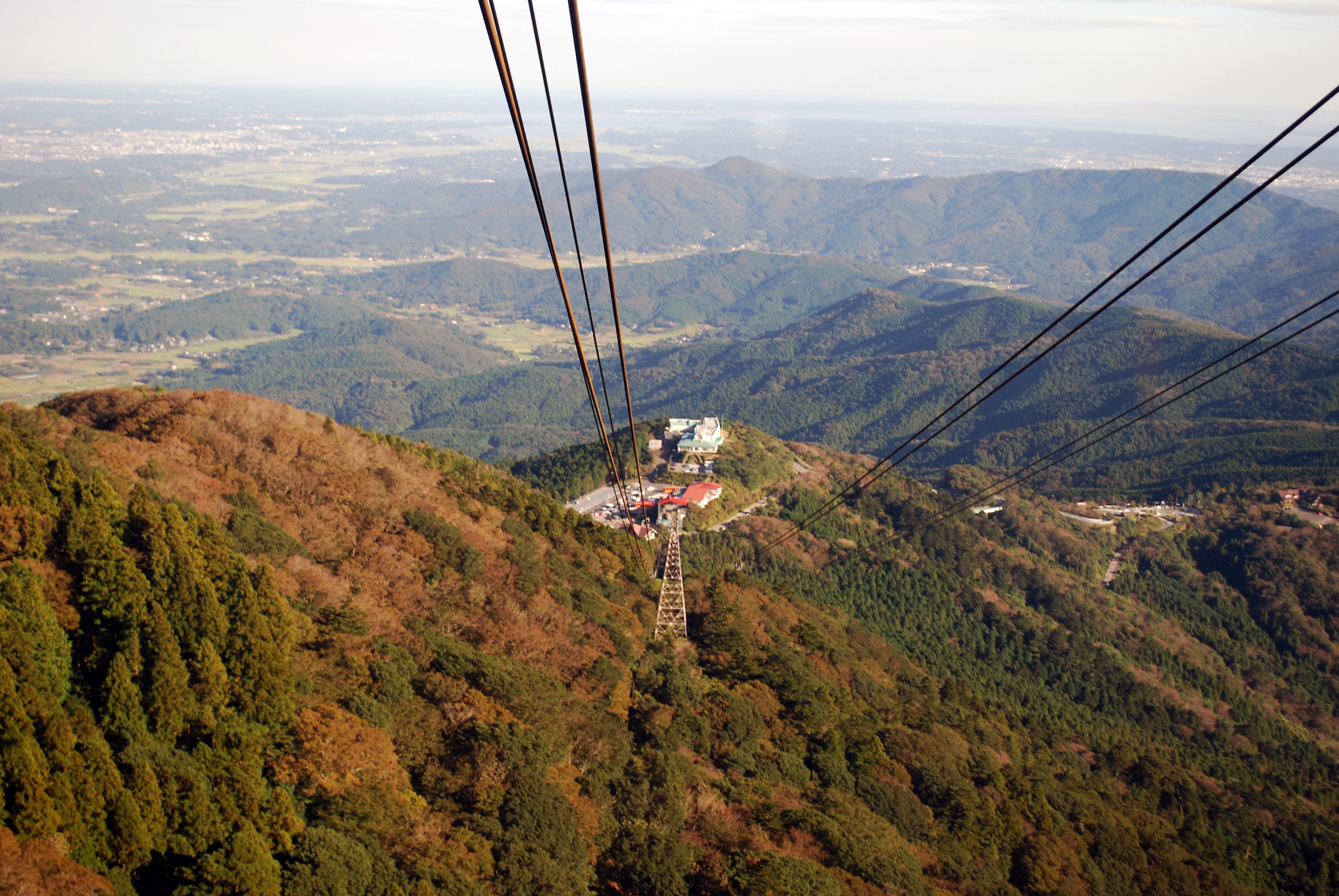
Mount Tsukuba Ropeway.

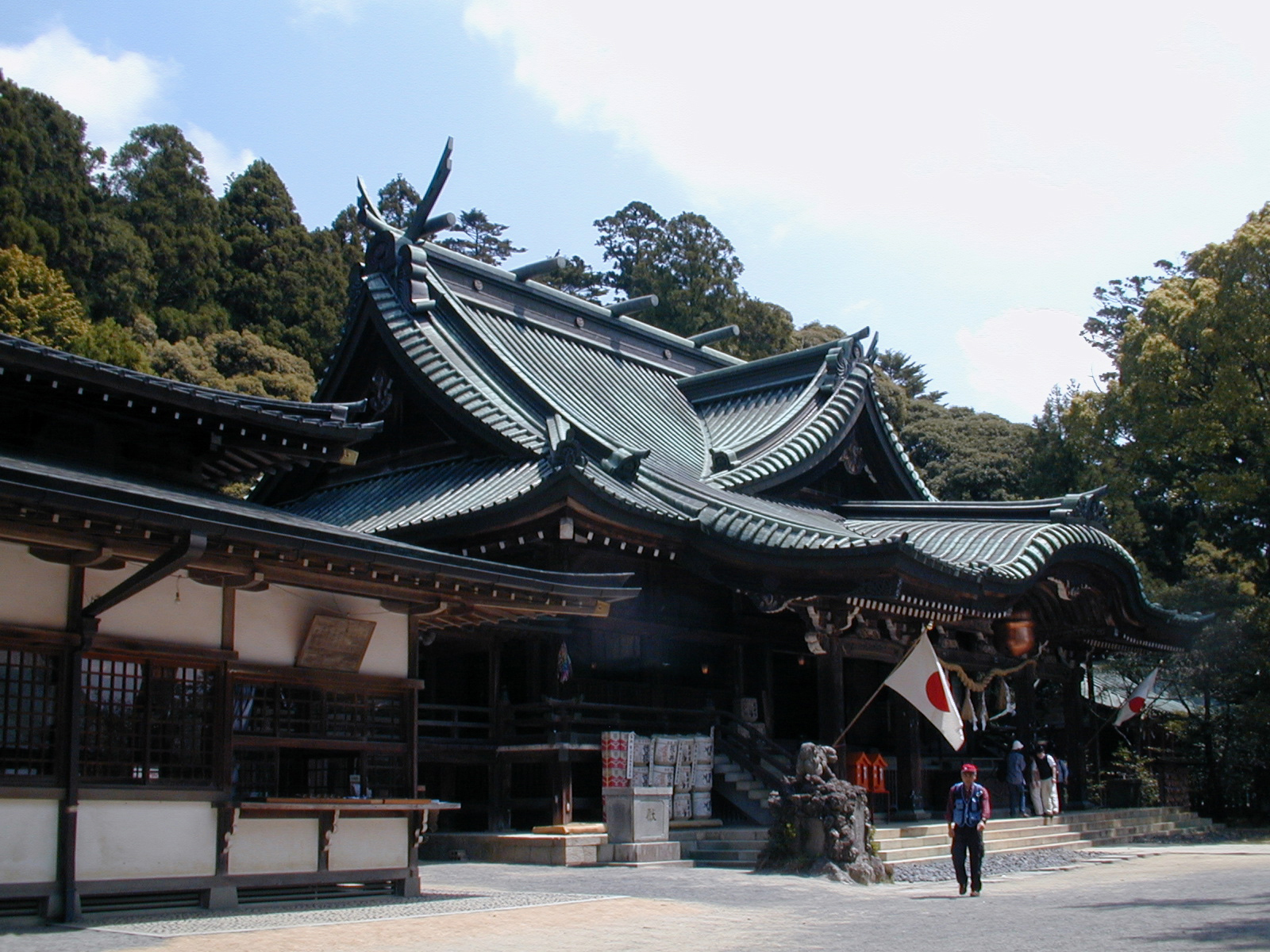
The ancient Shinto shrine at the foot of Mount Tsukuba.

Mt. Tsukuba is famous not only for the legends that have appeared in poetry anthologies since 710 A.D. Today, the mountain and its centuries-old Shinto shrine Tsukubasan Shrine are both a source of blessing for the Japanese people and a must-see attraction to both local and foreign tourists. As the peaks (male and female) make a couple, they are worshipped as kami in the Shinto religion and are believed to bestow marital harmony and conjugal bliss.

At the foot of the southern face lies the main shrine called “Tsukuba-san-jinja” (筑波山神社). This ancient shrine is a popular destination for tourists, festival (matsuri) attendees and the occasional Japanese-style wedding. It is from here where the main hiking trails up the mountain begin. One can choose to go straight up the mountain via the Miyukigahara course (御幸ヶ原コース), which parallels the Swiss-made funicular, to the notch between the peaks. Or one can follow the Shirakumobashi course (白雲橋コース) up to the east ridge, where it joins up with the Otatsuishi course, and then continues on up to Mt. Nyotai.

In addition to the funicular there is also an aerial tramway which follows the east ridge up the mountain, paralleling the Otatsuishi course (おたつ石コース). At the top of the mountain there are many gift shops and food stalls in the area between the two peaks. Here one can purchase ramen, omiyage, beer, and the local cure-all — toad oil (がま油).

At both Mt. Nantai-san and Mt. Nyotai-san are small shrines devoted to their respective gods. The mountain is a popular starting point for parasailing.

== Fauna and flora ==
=== Flora ===
Mount Tsukuba has an abundance of nature which covers the entire mountain. At lower elevations of the mountain are trees such as live oak (赤樫), mountain cherry (山桜), Japanese cedar (杉), Japanese red pine (赤松), and Hinoki cypress (檜). Higher in elevation, one can find species such as beech (ぶな), Japanese mountain maple (山紅葉) and a variety of conifers. Below these giants of the forest, the mountain is also home to hydrangea (紫陽花), rhododendron (つつじ), hosta, bush clover (ヤマハギ), five-leaf akebia (アケビ), fern, gold-banded lily (ヤマユリ), and the dog-tooth violet (片栗), to name a few.

=== Fauna ===
Amongst these exist a myriad of insects, including hairy caterpillars (毛虫), centipedes, giant hornets (スズメバチ), stick insects, praying mantis (カマキリ), cicada (セミ), a number of amphibians and over 70 species of butterfly (蝶). Larger animals such as the Japanese hare, mamushi pit viper (蝮), sika deer (鹿), Japanese boar (猪), raccoon dog (狸), Japanese badger (穴熊) and the Japanese red fox (狐) can be occasionally spotted. In addition, over 700 bird species are known to Mt. Tsukuba, these include the Japanese robin (駒鳥), Japanese pheasant, Japanese white-eye (目白), Japanese grosbeak, cinnamon sparrow (すずめ), Japanese quail, and the Japanese green woodpecker.
