= Suzumenomiya Station =

Railway station in Utsunomiya, Tochigi Prefecture, Japan

Suzumenomiya Station 雀宮駅
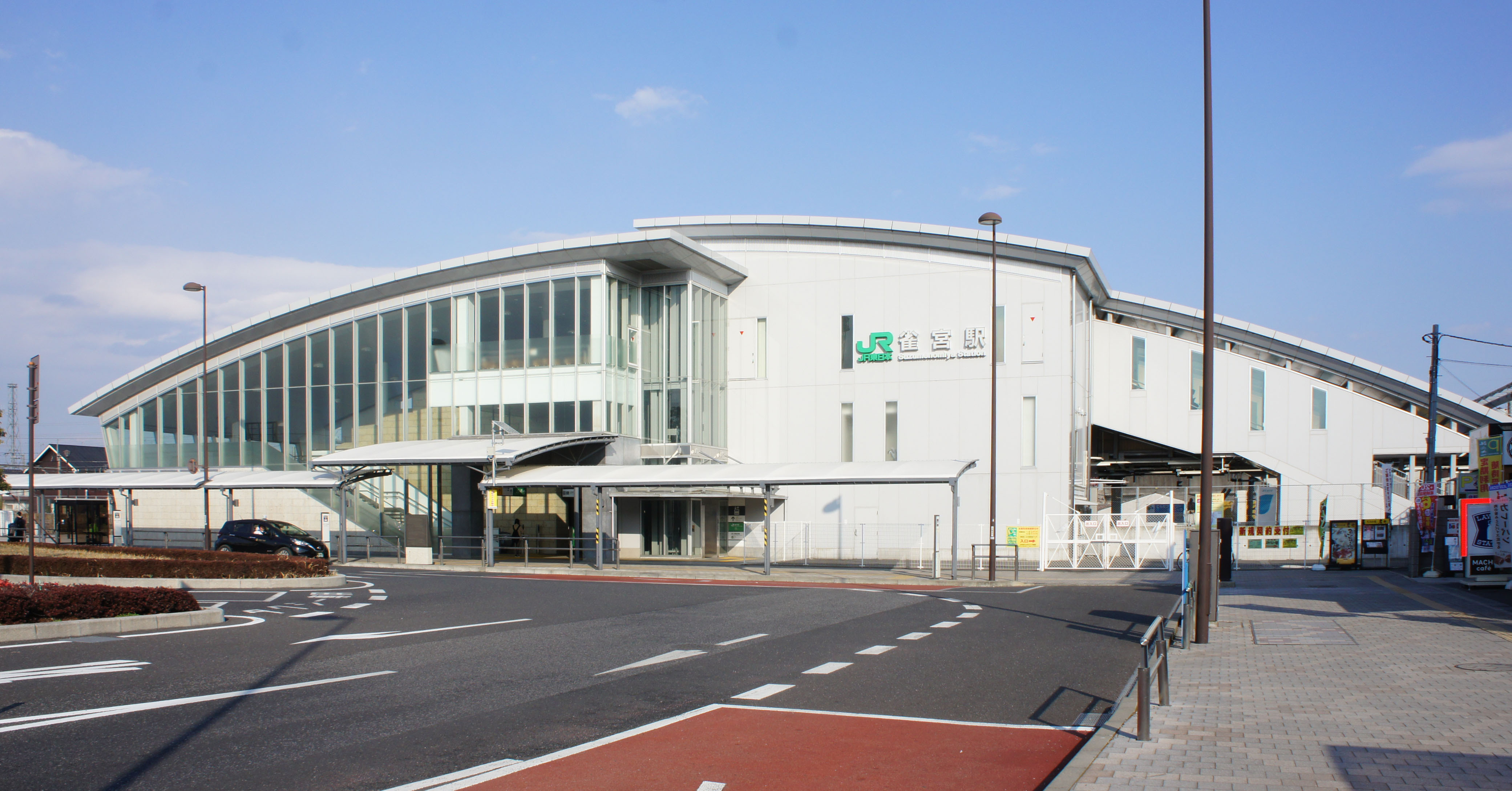
- Suzumenomiya Station, March 2019

General information
- Location: 1-19 Suzumenomiya, Utsunomiya-shi, Tochigi-ken 321-0121; Japan
- Coordinates: 36.4937°N 139.8767°E
- Operator: JR East
- Lines: ■ Utsunomiya Line; ■ Shōnan-Shinjuku Line
- Distance: 101.8 km from Tokyo
- Platforms: 1 side + 1 island platform
- Tracks: 4

Other information
- Status: Staffed ( Midori no Madoguchi )
- Website: www.jreast.co.jp/estation/station/info.aspx?StationCd=900

History
- Opened: 16 July 1895

Passengers
- FY2019: 4663

Services
Preceding station	JR East	Following station
Ishibashi towards Tokyo	Utsunomiya Line Local	Utsunomiya towards Kuroiso
Ishibashi One-way operation	Utsunomiya Line Rapid Rabbit	Utsunomiya Terminus
Ishibashi towards Zushi	Shōnan–Shinjuku Line Rapid Local	Utsunomiya Terminus
Location
- Location within Tochigi Prefecture Location within Japan

Suzumenomiya Station (雀宮駅, Suzumenomiya-eki) is a railway station in the city of Utsunomiya, Tochigi, Japan, operated by the East Japan Railway Company (JR East).

== Lines ==
Suzumenomiya Station is served by the Utsunomiya Line (Tohoku Main Line), and is 101.8 km from the starting point of the line at Tokyo. Through services to and from the Tokaido Line and Yokosuka Line are also provided via the Shonan-Shinjuku Line and Ueno-Tokyo Line.

== Station layout ==
This station has an elevated station building, located above one side platform and one island platform serving three tracks. However, platform 2 is not in use. The station has a Midori no Madoguchi staffed ticket office.

=== Platforms ===
1	■ Utsunomiya Line	for Utsunomiya, Nasushiobara, Kuroiso
2	■ Utsunomiya Line (Ueno-Tokyo Line)	for Ōmiya, Ueno, Tokyo, Yokohama, Atami, Numazu and Ito (via Tokaido Line and Ito Line)
2	■ Shōnan–Shinjuku Line	for Ōmiya, Shinjuku, Yokohama, Ōfuna and Zushi (via Yokosuka Line)

== History ==
Suzumenomiya Station opened on 16 July 1895. With the privatization of JNR on 1 April 1987, the station came under the control of JR East. The current station building was completed in March 2011.

== Passenger statistics ==
In fiscal 2019, the station was used by an average of 4663 passengers daily (boarding passengers only).

== Surrounding area ==
- JGSDF Camp Utsunomiya
- Suzumenomiya Jinja
- National Route 4
- JGSDF Camp Kita-Utsunomiya

== See also ==
- List of railway stations in Japan
