= Ujiie Station =

Railway station in Sakura, Tochigi Prefecture, Japan

Ujiie Station 氏家駅
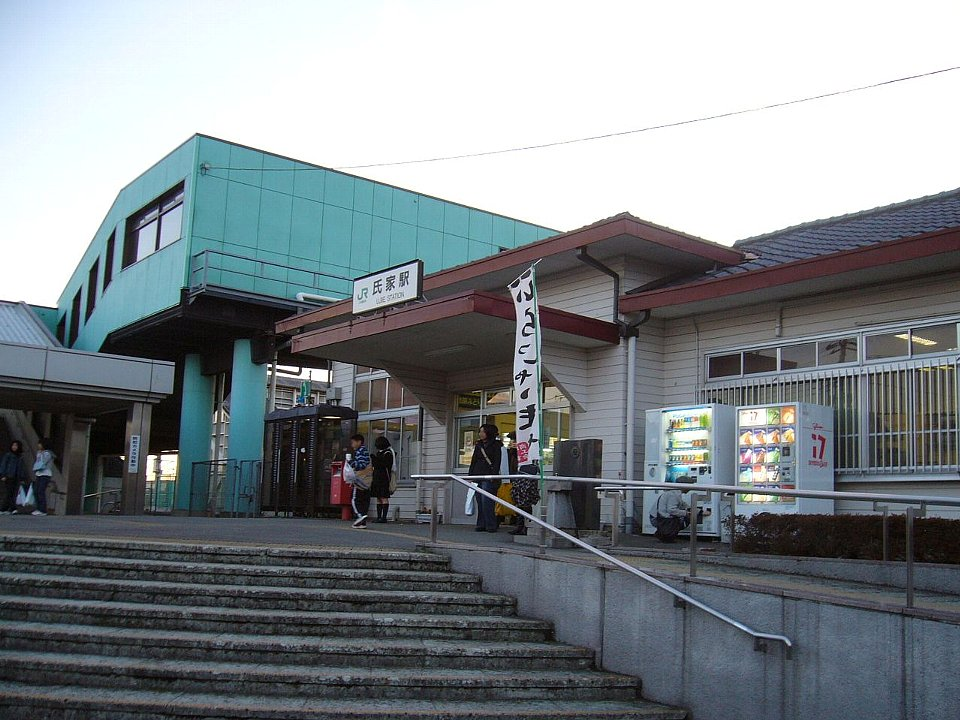
- Ujiie Station, December 2006

General information
- Location: 2344 Ujiie, Sakura City, Tochigi Prefecture 329-1311; Japan
- Coordinates: 36.6812°N 139.9618°E
- Operator: JR East
- Lines: Tōhoku Main Line; ( Utsunomiya Line)
- Distance: 127.1 km (79.0 mi) from Tokyo
- Platforms: 1 side + 1 island platform
- Tracks: 3
- Connections: Bus stop

Construction
- Structure type: At grade

Other information
- Status: Staffed (Midori no Madoguchi )
- Website: Official website

History
- Opened: 25 February 1897; 129 years ago

Passengers
- FY2019: 3,222 daily

Services
| Preceding station | JR East | Following station |
|---|---|---|
| Hōshakuji towards Tokyo | Utsunomiya Line Local | Kamasusaka towards Kuroiso |
Location
- Location within Tochigi Prefecture Location within Kanto Area Location within Japan

Ujiie Station (氏家駅, Ujiie-eki) is a railway station in the city of Sakura, Tochigi, Japan, operated by the East Japan Railway Company (JR East).

== Lines ==
Ujiie Station is served by the Utsunomiya Line (Tohoku Main Line), and lies 127.1 km from the starting point of the line at Tokyo.

== Station layout ==
This station has one island platform and one side platform connected to the station building by a footbridge. The station has a Midori no Madoguchi staffed ticket office.

=== Platforms ===
| 1 | ■ Utsunomiya Line (Ueno-Tokyo Line) | for Utsunomiya, Ōmiya, Ueno, Tokyo, Yokohama, Atami (via Tokaido Line) |
| 2 | ■ Utsunomiya Line | for Yaita, Nasushiobara, and Kuroiso |

== History ==
Ujiie Station opened on 25 February 1897. With the privatization of JNR on 1 April 1987, the station came under the control of JR East.

== Passenger statistics ==
In the 2019 fiscal year, the station was used by an average of 3,222 passengers daily (boarding passengers only).

== Surrounding area ==
- National Route 4
- National Route 293
- Kinugawa River
- Ujie Post Office

== See also ==
- List of railway stations in Japan
