= Jichi Medical University Station =

Railway station in Shimotsuke, Tochigi Prefecture, Japan

Jichi Medical University Station 自治医大駅
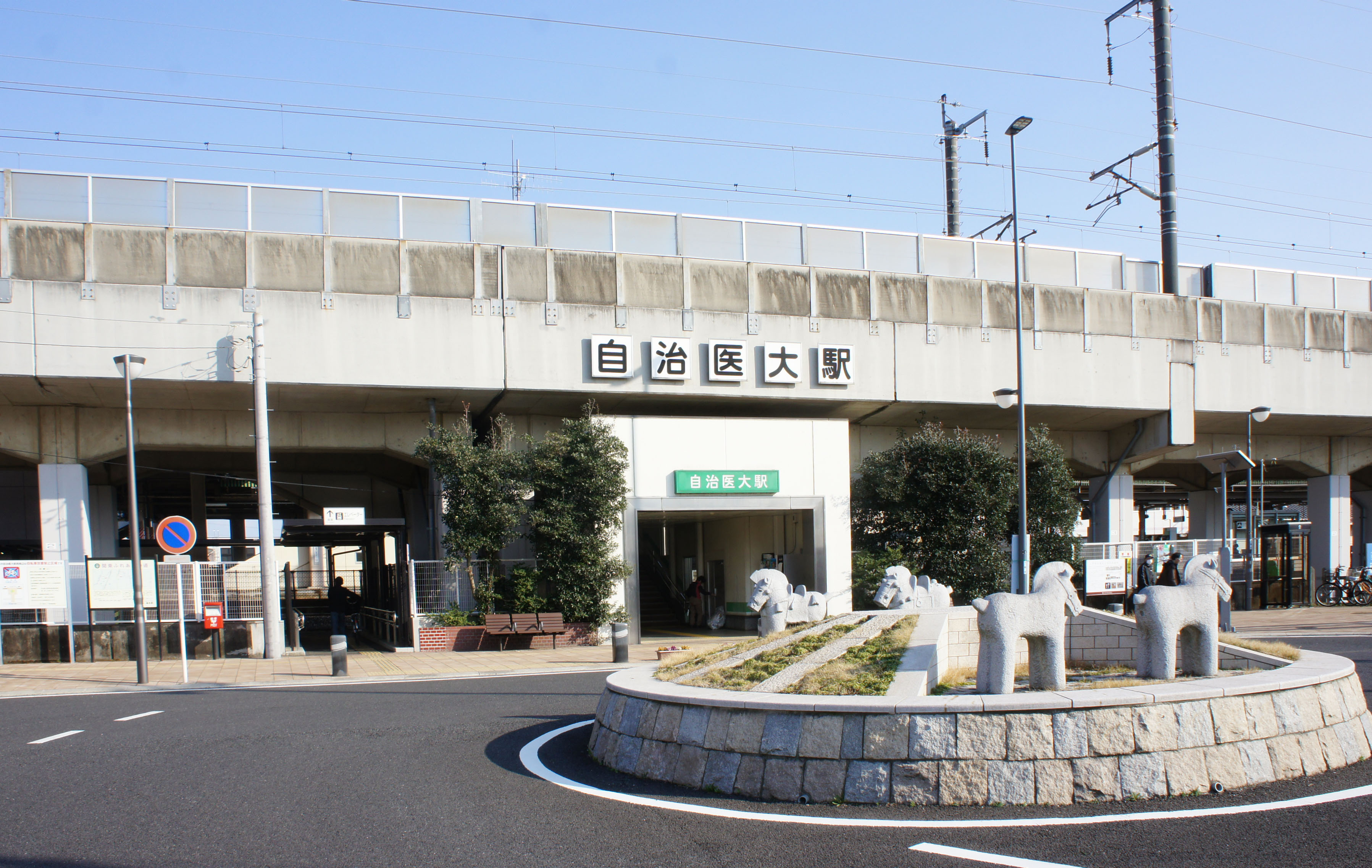
- Jichi Medical University Station West entrance, March 2019

General information
- Location: 3-13-3 Idaimae, Shimotsuke-shi, Tochigi-ken 329-0403; Japan
- Coordinates: 36.3956°N 139.8546°E
- Operator: JR East
- Lines: ■ Utsunomiya Line; ■ Shōnan-Shinjuku Line
- Distance: 90.7 km from Tokyo
- Platforms: 1 island platform
- Tracks: 2

Other information
- Status: Staffed
- Website: www.jreast.co.jp/estation/station/info.aspx?StationCd=784

History
- Opened: 27 April 1983

Passengers
- FY2019: 3520

Services
Preceding station	JR East	Following station
Koganei towards Tokyo	Utsunomiya Line Local	Ishibashi towards Kuroiso
Koganei One-way operation	Utsunomiya Line Rapid Rabbit	Ishibashi towards Utsunomiya
Koganei towards Zushi	Shōnan–Shinjuku Line Rapid Local	Ishibashi towards Utsunomiya
Location
- Location within Tochigi Prefecture Location within Japan

Jichi Medical University Station (自治医大駅, Jichi-idai eki) is a railway station in the city of Shimotsuke, Tochigi, Japan, operated by the East Japan Railway Company (JR East). It is named for Jichi Medical University.

== Lines ==
Jichi Medical University Station is served by the Utsunomiya Line (Tohoku Main Line), and is 90.7 km from the starting point of the line at Tokyo. Through services to and from the Tokaido Line and Yokosuka Line are also provided via the Shonan-Shinjuku Line and Ueno-Tokyo Line.

== Station layout ==
This station has an elevated station building, located above one island platform serving two tracks. The station is staffed.

=== Platforms ===
1	■ Utsunomiya Line (Ueno-Tokyo Line)	for Ōmiya, Ueno, Tokyo, Yokohama, Atami, Numazu and Ito (via Tokaido Line and Ito Line)
1	■ Shōnan–Shinjuku Line	for Ōmiya, Shinjuku, Yokohama, Ōfuna and Zushi (via Yokosuka Line)
2	■ Utsunomiya Line	for Utsunomiya, Nasushiobara, Kuroiso

== History ==
Jichi Medical University Station opened on 27 April 1983. With the privatization of JNR on 1 April 1987, the station came under the control of JR East.

== Passenger statistics ==
In fiscal 2019, the station was used by an average of 3520 passengers daily (boarding passengers only).

== Surrounding area ==
- Jichi Medical University
- National Route 4
