= Koganei Station =

Railway station in Shimotsuke, Tochigi Prefecture, Japan

Koganei Station 小金井駅
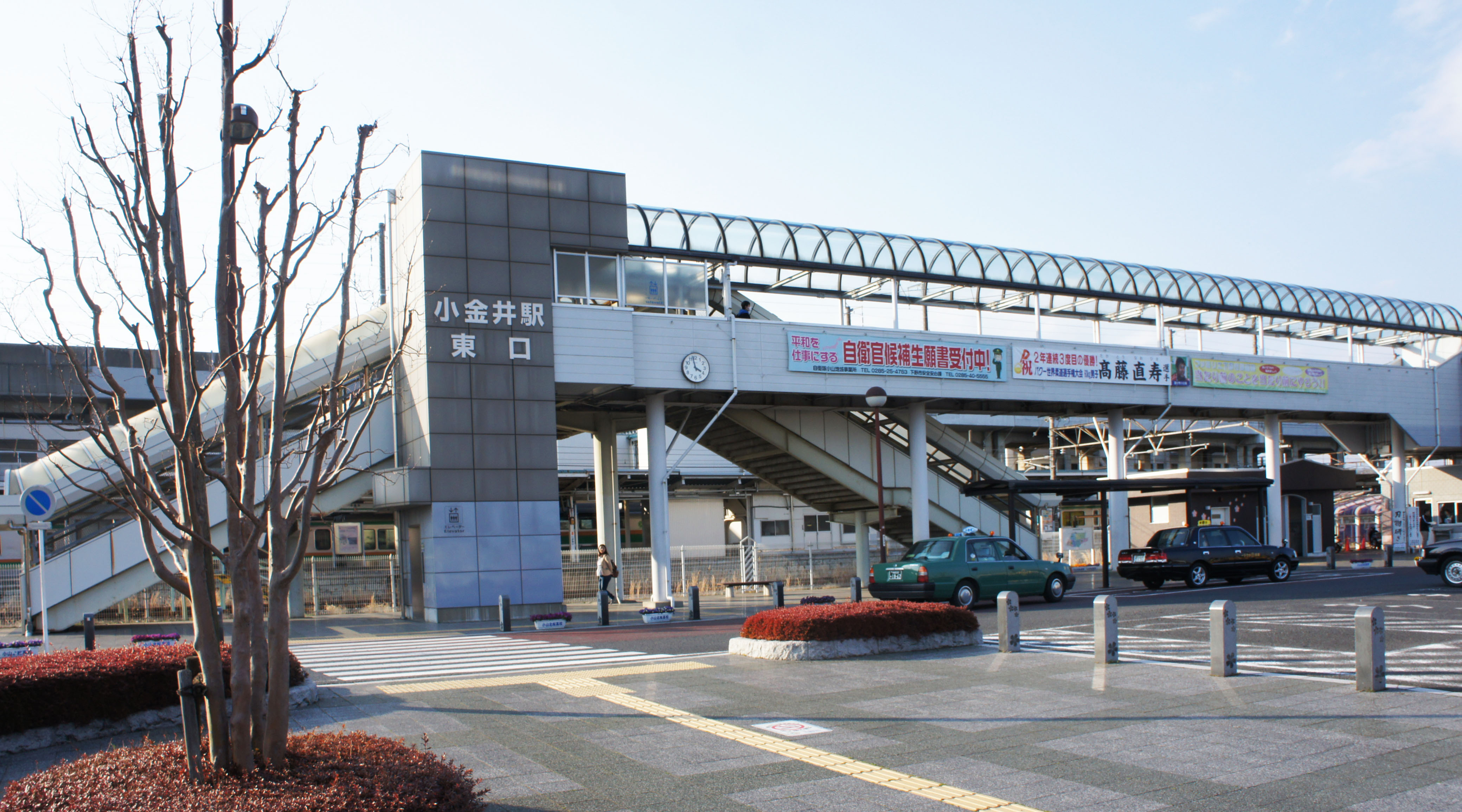
- East entrance, February 2019

General information
- Location: Koganei, Shimotsuke-shi, Tochigi-ken 329-0414; Japan
- Coordinates: 36.3743°N 139.8421°E
- Operator: JR East
- Lines: ■ Utsunomiya Line; ■ Shōnan-Shinjuku Line
- Distance: 88.1 km from Tokyo
- Platforms: 2 island platforms
- Tracks: 4

Other information
- Status: Staffed
- Website: www.jreast.co.jp/estation/station/info.aspx?StationCd=677

History
- Opened: 25 March 1893

Passengers
- FY2022: 3351

Services
Preceding station	JR East	Following station
Oyama towards Tokyo	Utsunomiya Line Local	Jichi Medical University towards Kuroiso
Oyama One-way operation	Utsunomiya Line Rapid Rabbit	Jichi Medical University towards Utsunomiya
Oyama towards Zushi	Shōnan–Shinjuku Line Rapid Local	Jichi Medical University towards Utsunomiya
Location
- Location within Tochigi Prefecture Location within Japan

Koganei Station (小金井駅, Koganei-eki) is a railway station in the city of Shimotsuke, Tochigi, Japan, operated by the East Japan Railway Company (JR East).

== Lines ==
Koganei Station is served by the Utsunomiya Line (Tohoku Main Line), and is 88.1 km from the starting point of the line at Tokyo. Through services to and from the Tokaido Line and Yokosuka Line are also provided via the Shonan-Shinjuku Line and Ueno-Tokyo Line.

== Station layout ==
This station has an elevated station building, located above two island platforms serving four tracks. The station has a Reserved seat ticket vending machine.

=== Platforms ===
1,2	■ Utsunomiya Line	for Utsunomiya, Nasushiobara, Kuroiso
3,4	■ Utsunomiya Line (Ueno-Tokyo Line)	for Ōmiya, Ueno, Tokyo, Yokohama, Atami, Numazu and Ito (via Tokaido Line and Ito Line)
3,4	■ Shōnan–Shinjuku Line	for Ōmiya, Shinjuku, Yokohama, Ōfuna and Zushi (via Yokosuka Line)

== History ==
Koganei Station opened on 25 March 1893. During World War II, Koganei Station was strafed by American fighter aircraft on 28 July 1945, killing some 30 civilians on a Tohoku Main Line train stopped at the station. A monument describing the event exists at the west exit of the station. With the privatization of JNR on 1 April 1987, the station came under the control of JR East.

== Passenger statistics ==
In fiscal 2019, the station was used by an average of 4136 passengers daily (boarding passengers only). The passenger figures for previous years are as shown below.

Fiscal year	Daily average
2000	4,039
2005	3,947
2010	3,988
2015	3,962

== Surrounding area ==
- Former Kokubunji town hall
- Shimotsuke Koganei Post Office
