= Kataoka Station =

Railway station in Yaita, Tochigi Prefecture, Japan

Kataoka Station 片岡駅
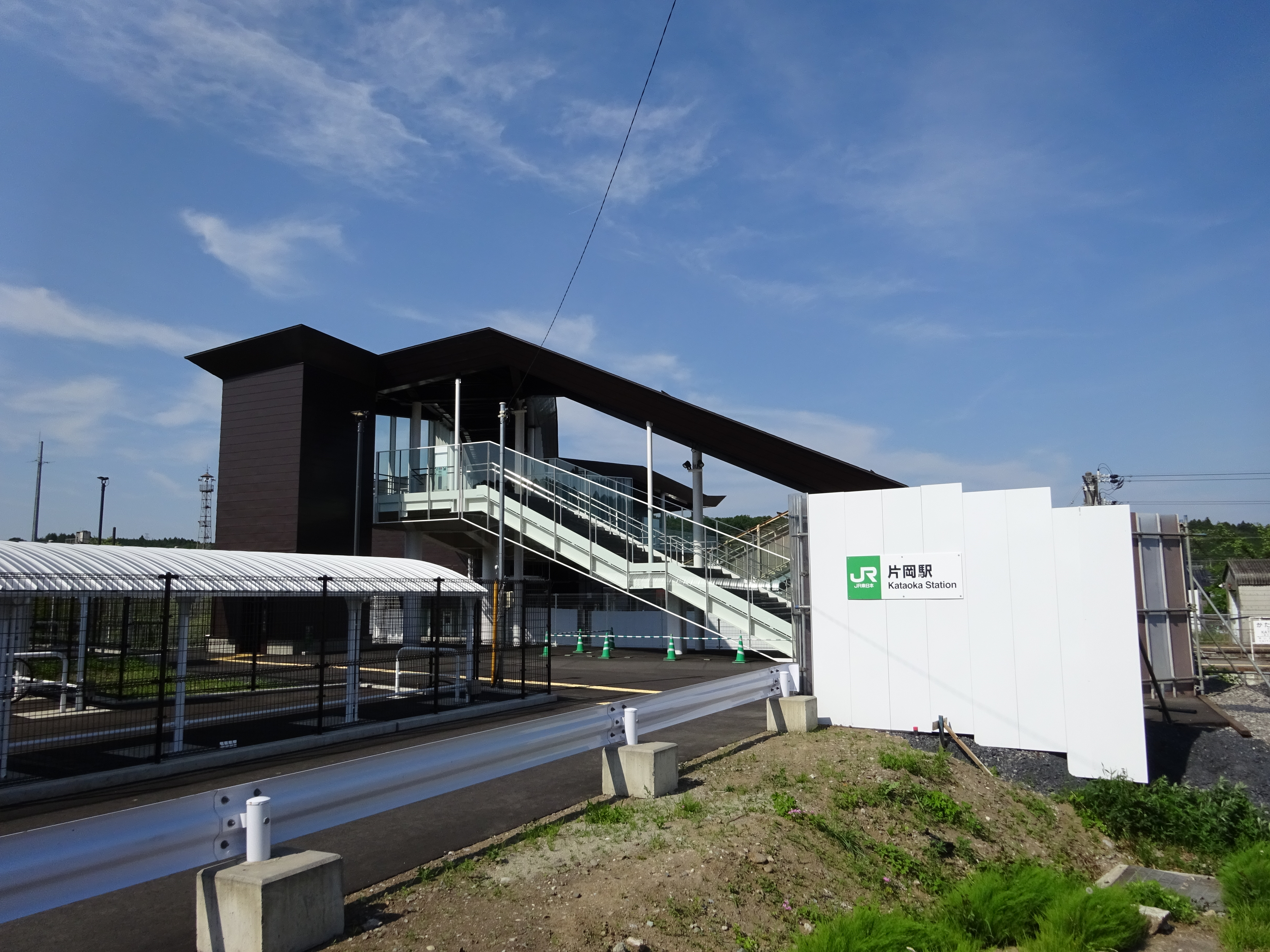
- Kataoka Station west entrance, May 2015

General information
- Location: Kataoka, Yaita-shi, Tochigi-ken 329-1571; Japan
- Coordinates: 36.7547°N 139.9455°E
- Operator: JR East
- Line: Tōhoku Main Line
- Distance: 135.5 km from Tokyo
- Platforms: 1 side + 1 island platform
- Connections: Bus stop

Other information
- Status: Staffed
- Website: Official website

History
- Opened: 5 June 1897

Passengers
- FY2019: 730 daily

Services
Preceding station	JR East	Following station
Kamasusaka towards Tokyo	Utsunomiya Line Local	Yaita towards Kuroiso
Location
- Location within Tochigi Prefecture Location within Japan

Kataoka Station (片岡駅, Kataoka-eki) is a railway station in the city of Yaita, Tochigi, Japan, operated by the East Japan Railway Company (JR East).

== Lines ==
Kataoka Station is served by the Utsunomiya Line (Tohoku Main Line), and lies 135.5 km from the starting point of the line at Tokyo.

== Station layout ==
This station has an elevated station building with one island platform and one side platform underneath; however, platform 2 is not in use. The station is staffed.

=== Platforms ===
1	■ Utsunomiya Line (Ueno-Tokyo Line)	for Utsunomiya, Ōmiya, Ueno, Tokyo, Yokohama, Atami (via Tokaido Line)
3	■ Utsunomiya Line	for Yaita, Nasushiobara, and Kuroiso

== History ==
Kataoka Station opened on 5 June 1897. With the privatization of JNR on 1 April 1987, the station came under the control of JR East.

== Passenger statistics ==
In fiscal 2019, the station was used by an average of 730 passengers daily (boarding passengers only).

== Surrounding area ==
- Kataoka Post Office
- National Route 4

== See also ==
- List of railway stations in Japan
