= Kamasusaka Station =

Railway station in Sakura, Tochigi Prefecture, Japan

Kamasusaka Station 蒲須坂駅
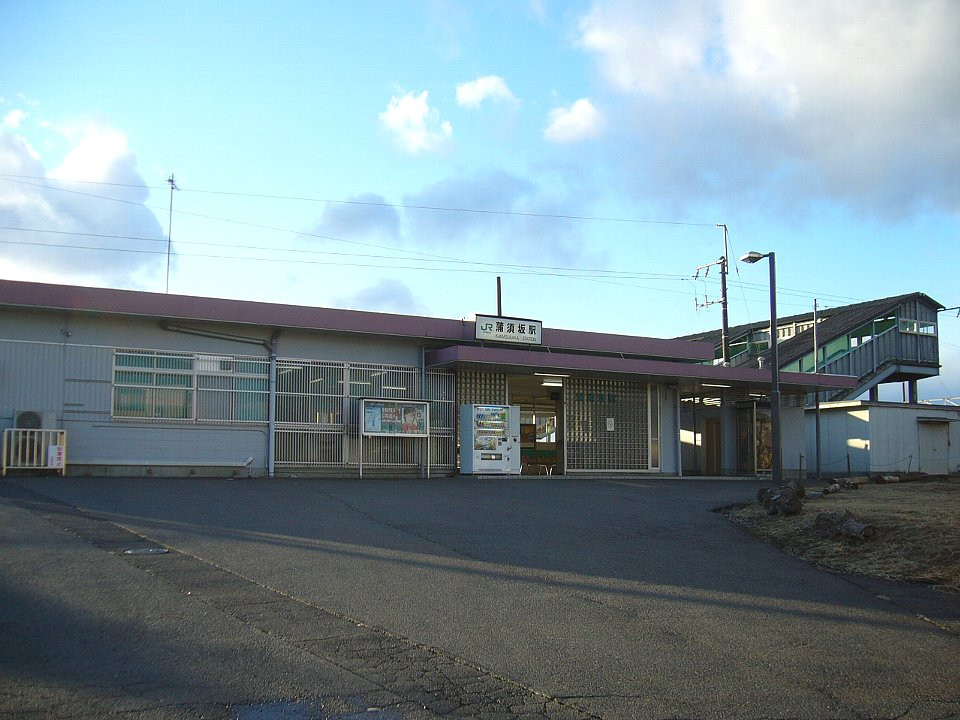
- Kamasusaka Station, December 2006

General information
- Location: 698 Kamasusaka, Sakura-shi, Tochigi-ken 329-1332; Japan
- Coordinates: 36.7208°N 139.9505°E
- Operator: JR East
- Line: Tōhoku Main Line
- Distance: 131.6 km from Tokyo
- Platforms: 1 side + 1 island platform

Other information
- Status: Unstaffed
- Website: Official website

History
- Opened: 11 February 1923

Passengers
- FY2014: 364 daily

Services
Preceding station	JR East	Following station
Ujiie towards Tokyo	Utsunomiya Line Local	Kataoka towards Kuroiso
Location
- Location within Tochigi Prefecture Location within Japan

Kamasusaka Station (蒲須坂駅, Kamasusaka-eki) is a railway station in the city of Sakura, Tochigi, Japan, operated by the East Japan Railway Company (JR East).

== Lines ==
Kamasusaka Station is served by the Utsunomiya Line (Tohoku Main Line), and lies 131.6 km from the starting point of the line at Tokyo.

== Station layout ==
This station has two island platforms connected to the station building by a footbridge; however, only one side of each platform is in use. The station is unattended.

=== Platforms ===
1	■ Utsunomiya Line (Ueno-Tokyo Line)	for Utsunomiya, Ōmiya, Ueno, Tokyo, Yokohama, Atami (via Tokaido Line)
2	■ Utsunomiya Line	for Yaita, Nasushiobara, and Kuroiso

== History ==
Kamasusaka Station opened on 11 February 1923. With the privatization of JNR on 1 April 1987, the station came under the control of JR East.

== See also ==
- List of railway stations in Japan
