= Nozaki Station (Tochigi) =

Railway station in Ōtawara, Tochigi Prefecture, Japan

Nozaki Station 野崎駅
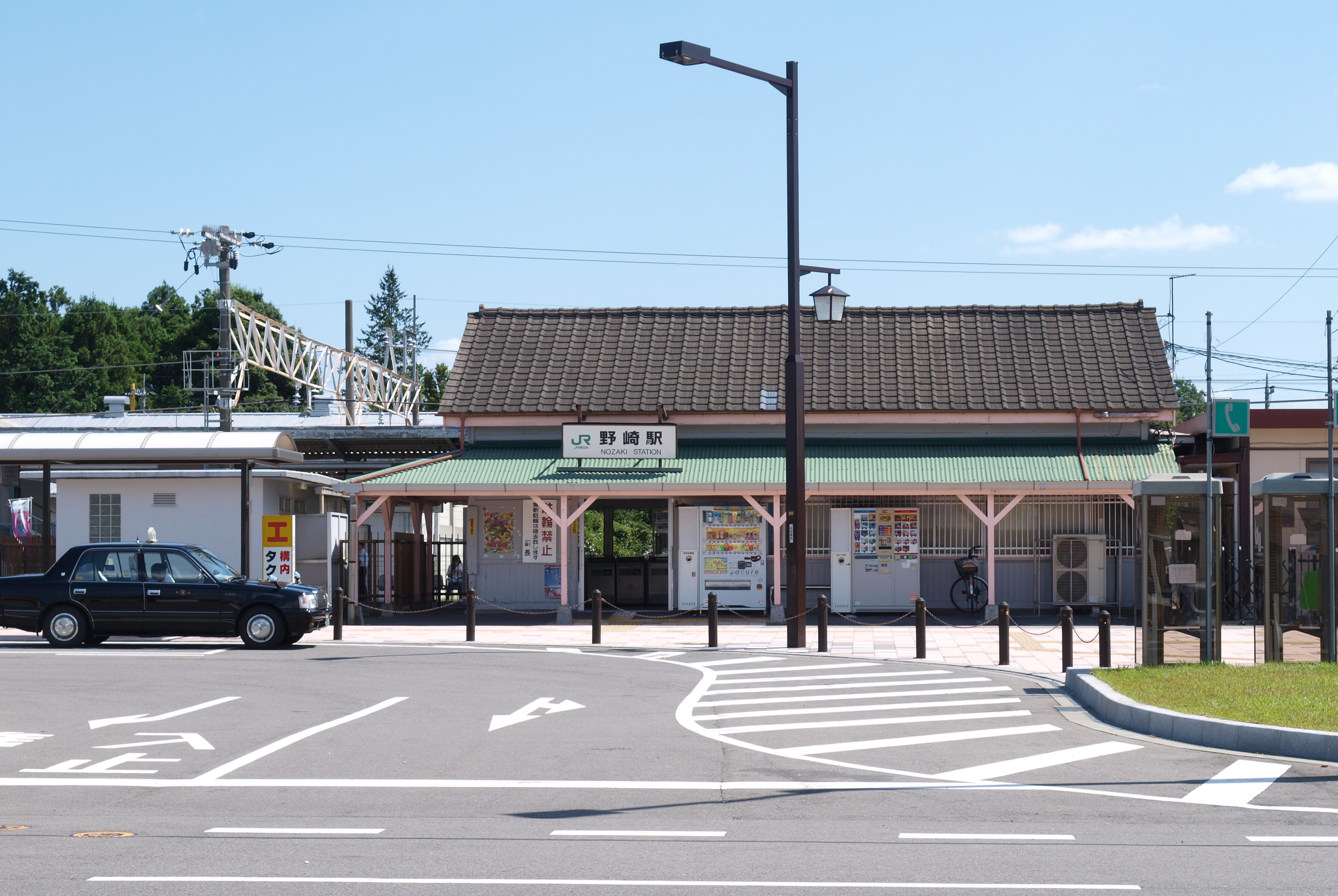
- Nozaki Station, September 2010

General information
- Location: Usuba, Ōtawara-shi, Tochigi-ken 324-0035; Japan
- Coordinates: 36.8439°N 139.9580°E
- Operator: JR East
- Line: Tōhoku Main Line
- Distance: 146.6 km from Tokyo
- Platforms: 1 side + 1 island platform
- Connections: Bus stop

Other information
- Status: Staffed
- Website: Official website

History
- Opened: 25 February 1897

Passengers
- FY2019: 1306 daily

Services
| Preceding station | JR East | Following station |
|---|---|---|
| Yaita towards Tokyo | Utsunomiya Line Local | Nishi-Nasuno towards Kuroiso |
Location
- Location within Tochigi Prefecture Location within Japan

Nozaki Station (野崎駅, Nozaki-eki) is a railway station in the city of Ōtawara, Tochigi, Japan, operated by the East Japan Railway Company (JR East).

== Lines ==
Nozaki Station is served by the Utsunomiya Line (Tohoku Main Line), and lies 146.6 km from the starting point of the line at Tokyo.

== Station layout ==
This station has one island platform and one side platform connected to the station building by a footbridge; however, platform 2 is not in use. The station is staffed.

=== Platforms ===
| 1 | ■ Utsunomiya Line | for Nasushiobara and Kuroiso |
| 3 | ■ Utsunomiya Line (Ueno-Tokyo Line) | for Utsunomiya, Ōmiya, Ueno, Tokyo, Yokohama, Atami (via Tokaido Line) |

== History ==
Nozaki Station opened on 25 February 1897. With the privatization of JNR on 1 April 1987, the station came under the control of JR East.

== Passenger statistics ==
In fiscal 2019, the station was used by an average of 1306 passengers daily (boarding passengers only).

== Surrounding area ==
- National Route 4
- National Route 461

== See also ==
- List of railway stations in Japan
