= Ishibashi Station (Tochigi) =

Railway station in Shimotsuke, Tochigi Prefecture, Japan

Ishibashi Station 石橋駅
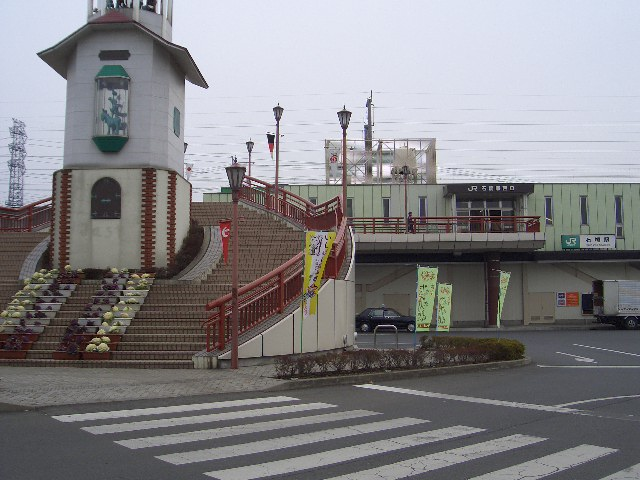
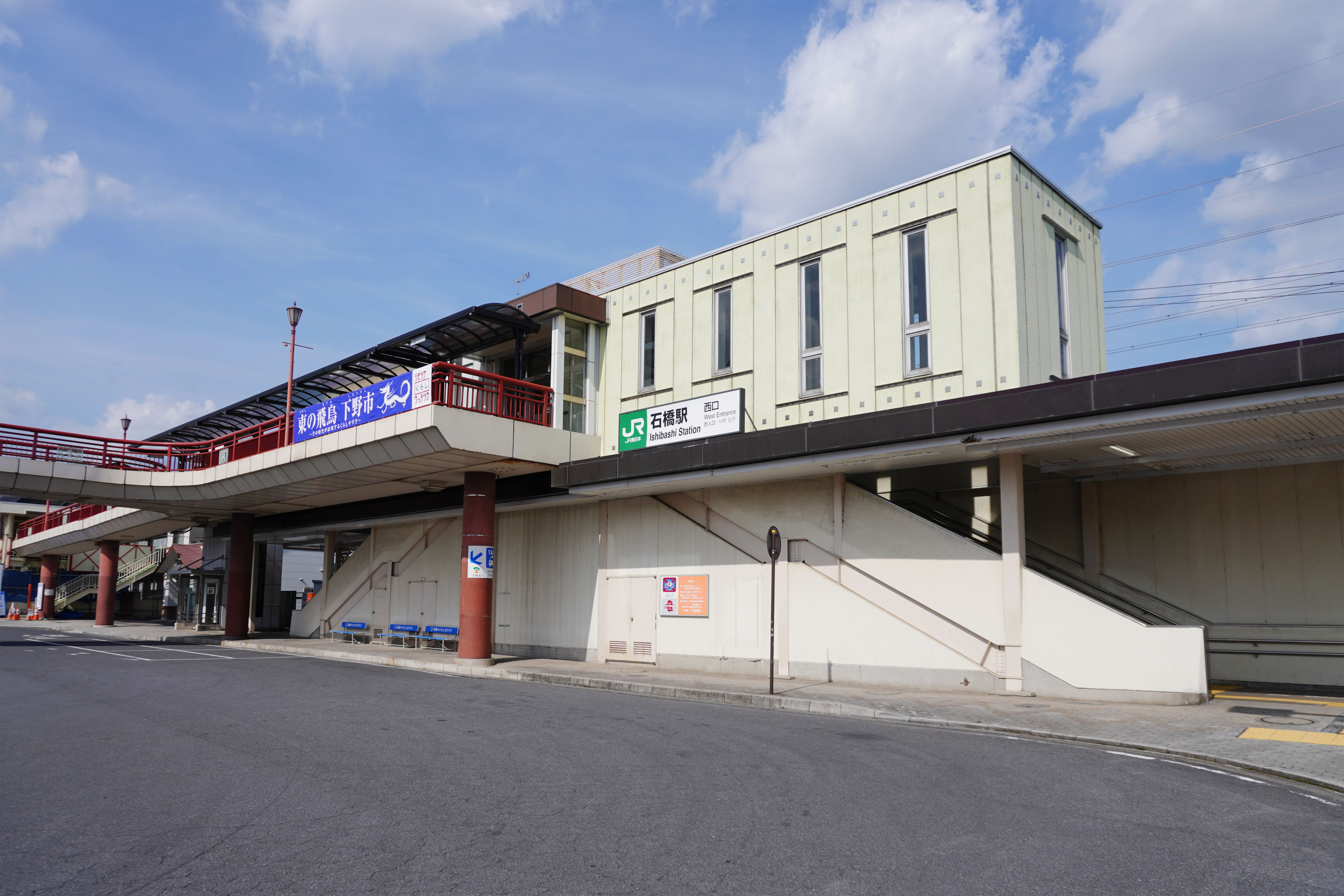
- ←January 2005 June 8, 2024→

General information
- Location: 240 Ishibashi, Shimotsuke-shi, Tochigi-ken 329-0511; Japan
- Coordinates: 36°26′11″N 139°52′00″E
- Operator: JR East
- Lines: ■ Utsunomiya Line; ■ Shōnan-Shinjuku Line
- Distance: 95.4 km from Tokyo
- Platforms: 2 side platforms
- Tracks: 2

Other information
- Status: Staffed
- Website: www.jreast.co.jp/estation/station/info.aspx?StationCd=120

History
- Opened: 16 July 1895

Passengers
- FY2019: 4860

Services
Preceding station	JR East	Following station
Jichi Medical University towards Tokyo	Utsunomiya Line Local	Suzumenomiya towards Kuroiso
Jichi Medical University One-way operation	Utsunomiya Line Rapid Rabbit	Suzumenomiya towards Utsunomiya
Jichi Medical University towards Zushi	Shōnan–Shinjuku Line Rapid Local	Suzumenomiya towards Utsunomiya
Location
- Location within Tochigi Prefecture Location within Japan

Ishibashi Station (石橋駅, Ishibashi-eki) is a railway station in the city of Shimotsuke, Tochigi, Japan, operated by the East Japan Railway Company (JR East).

== Lines ==
Ishibashi Station is served by the Utsunomiya Line (Tohoku Main Line), and is 95.4 km from the starting point of the line at Tokyo. Through services to and from the Tokaido Line and Yokosuka Line are also provided via the Shonan-Shinjuku Line and Ueno-Tokyo Line.

== Station layout ==
This station has an elevated station building, located above two opposed side platforms serving two tracks. The station is staffed.

=== Platforms ===
1	■ Utsunomiya Line	for Utsunomiya, Nasushiobara, Kuroiso
2	■ Utsunomiya Line (Ueno-Tokyo Line)	for Ōmiya, Ueno, Tokyo, Yokohama, Atami, Numazu and Ito (via Tokaido Line and Ito Line)
2	■ Shōnan–Shinjuku Line	for Ōmiya, Shinjuku, Yokohama, Ōfuna and Zushi (via Yokosuka Line)

== History ==
Ishibashi Station opened on 16 July 1895. With the privatization of JNR on 1 April 1987, the station came under the control of JR East.

== Passenger statistics ==
In fiscal 2019, the station was used by an average of 4860 passengers daily (boarding passengers only).

== Surrounding area ==
- former Ishibashi town hall
- Ishibashi Post Office
- National Route 4
- National Route 352
