= Nogi =

Nogi or NOGI may refer to:

== Places ==
- Nogi, Tochigi, a town in Tochigi Prefecture
  - Nogi Station (Tochigi), a railway station in Nogi
- Nogi District, Shimane
  - Nogi Station (Shimane), a railway station in Shimane Prefecture
- Nogi Shrine (Tokyo)

== Other uses ==
- NOGI Awards, presented to divers by the U.S. Academy of Underwater Arts and Sciences
- North Osea Gründer Industries, a fictional company in the Ace Combat series.

== People with the surname ==
- Nogi Maresuke (1849–1912), a Japanese general

== See also ==
- NogiBingo! a Japanese television variety show
- European Nogi Brazilian Jiu Jitsu Championship
