= Shimotsuke =

Shimotsuke may refer to:

- Shimotsuke Province
- Shimotsuke, Tochigi
