= Koga Station (Ibaraki) =

Railway station in Koga, Ibaraki Prefecture, Japan

Koga Station 古河駅
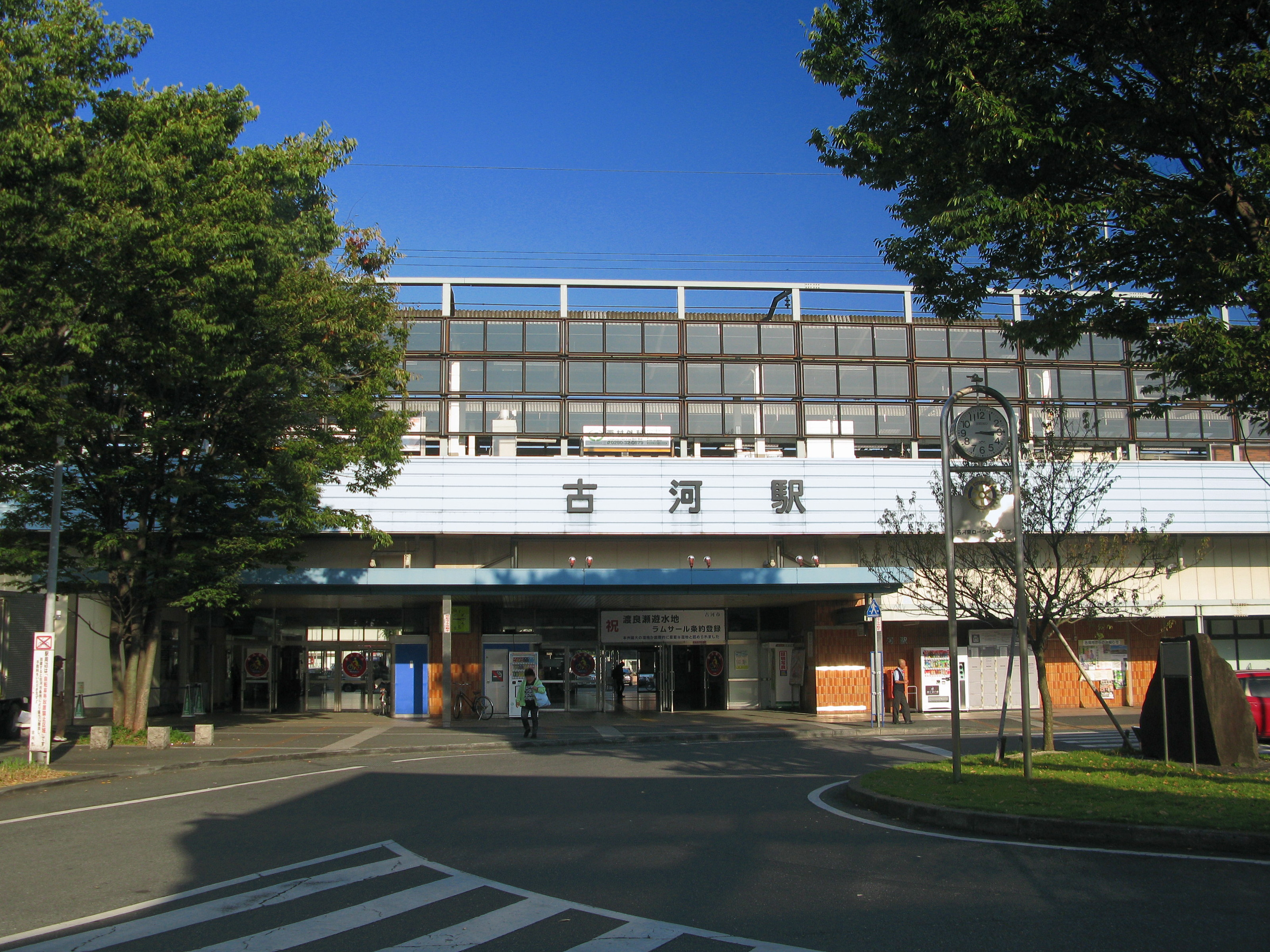
- Koga Station, October 2012

General information
- Location: 1-1-15 Honcho, Koga-shi, Ibaraki-ken 306-0023; Japan
- Coordinates: 36.1944°N 139.7099°E
- Operator: JR East
- Line: Tōhoku Main Line
- Distance: 64.7 km from Tokyo
- Platforms: 2 island platforms

Other information
- Status: Staffed (Midori no Madoguchi )
- Website: Official website

History
- Opened: 16 July 1885

Passengers
- FY2019: 13,050

Services
Preceding station	JR East	Following station
Kuki One-way operation	Utsunomiya Line Rapid Rabbit	Oyama towards Utsunomiya
Kurihashi towards Tokyo	Utsunomiya Line Local	Nogi towards Kuroiso
Kuki towards Zushi	Shōnan–Shinjuku Line Rapid	Oyama towards Utsunomiya
Kurihashi towards Zushi	Shōnan–Shinjuku Line Local	Nogi towards Utsunomiya
Location
- Location within Ibaraki Prefecture Location within Japan

Koga Station (古河駅, Koga-eki) is a passenger railway station in the city of Koga, Ibaraki, Japan, operated by the East Japan Railway Company (JR East).

== Lines ==
Koga Station is served by the Tōhoku Main Line (Utsunomiya Line) and is located 64.7 kilometers from the starting point of the line in Tokyo. It is the only station on the line in the Ibaraki Prefecture.

== Station layout ==
The station consists of two elevated island platforms with the station building underneath, and it has a Midori no Madoguchi staffed ticket office.

=== Platforms ===
1,2	■ Utsunomiya Line	for Oyama, Utsunomiya, Kuroiso
3,4	■ Utsunomiya Line (Ueno-Tokyo Line)	for Ōmiya, Ueno, Tokyo, Yokohama, Atami, Numazu and Ito (via Tokaido Line and Ito Line)
3,4	■ Shōnan–Shinjuku Line	for Ōmiya, Shinjuku, Yokohama, Ōfuna and Zushi (via Yokosuka Line)

== History ==
Koga Station opened on 16 July 1885. The station was rebuilt with elevated tracks in 1984. On 1 April 1987, the station came under the control of JR East with the privatization of Japanese National Railways (JNR).

== Passenger statistics ==
In fiscal 2019, the station was used by an average of 13,050 passengers daily (boarding passengers only).

== Surrounding area ==
- Koga City Hall
- Koga Post Office
- Koga History Museum
- JGSDF Camp Koga

== See also ==
- List of railway stations in Japan
