= Mamada Station =

Railway station in Oyama, Tochigi Prefecture, Japan

Mamada Station/ 間々田駅
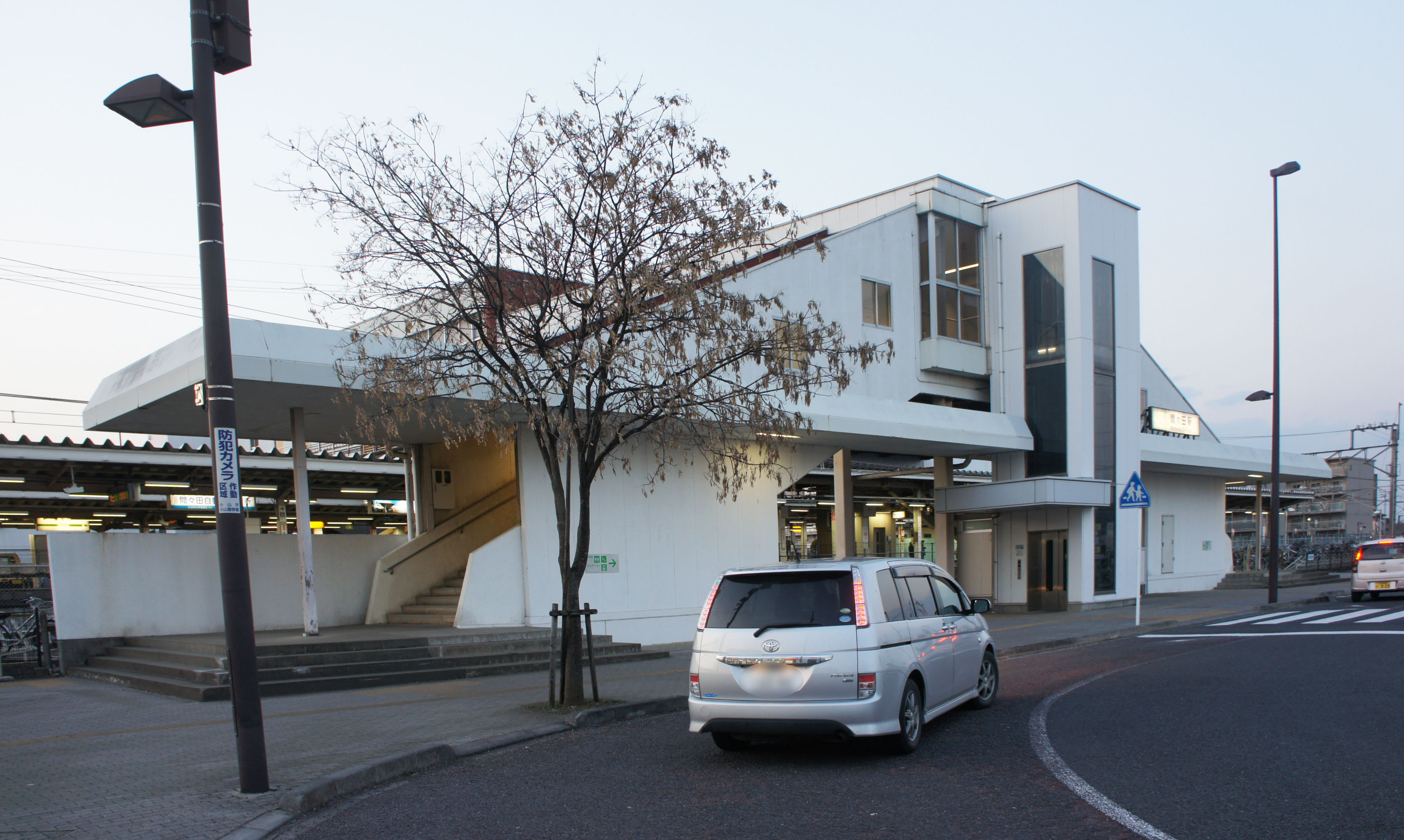
- Mamada Station east exit in March 2019

General information
- Location: 3 Otome, Oyama-shi, Tochigi-ken 329-0214; Japan
- Coordinates: 36.2580°N 139.7610°E
- Operator: JR East
- Line: Tōhoku Main Line
- Distance: 73.3 km from Tokyo
- Platforms: 2 side platforms
- Tracks: 2

Other information
- Status: Staffed
- Website: Official website

History
- Opened: 1 April 1894

Passengers
- FY2019: 4,225

Services
Preceding station	JR East	Following station
Nogi towards Tokyo	Utsunomiya Line Local	Oyama towards Kuroiso
Nogi towards Zushi	Shōnan–Shinjuku Line Local	Oyama towards Utsunomiya
Location
- Location within Tochigi Prefecture Location within Japan

Mamada Station (間々田駅, Mamada-eki) is a railway station in the city of Oyama, Tochigi, Japan, operated by the East Japan Railway Company (JR East).

== Lines ==
Mamada Station is served by the Tōhoku Main Line (Utsunomiya Line), and is located 73.3 kilometers from the starting point of the line at Tokyo.

== Station layout ==
The station consists of two opposed side platforms, with an elevated station building. The station is staffed.

=== Platforms ===
1	■ Utsunomiya Line	for Oyama, Utsunomiya, Kuroiso
3	■ Utsunomiya Line (Ueno-Tokyo Line)	for Ōmiya, Ueno, Tokyo, Yokohama, Atami, Numazu and Ito (via Tokaido Line and Ito Line)
3	■ Shōnan–Shinjuku Line	for Ōmiya, Shinjuku, Yokohama, Ōfuna and Zushi (via Yokosuka Line)

== History ==
Mamada Station opened on 1 April 1894. The current station building was completed in February 1979. On 1 April 1987 the station came under the control of JR East with the privatization of Japanese National Railways (JNR).

In fiscal 2019, the station was used by an average of 4225 passengers daily (boarding passengers only). The passenger figures for previous years are as shown below.

== Surrounding area ==
- National Route 4
- Oyama Otome Post Office
- Oyama City Museum

== See also ==
- List of railway stations in Japan
