= Nishi-Nasuno Station =

Railway station in Nasushiobara, Tochigi Prefecture, Japan

Nishi-Nasuno Station 西那須野駅
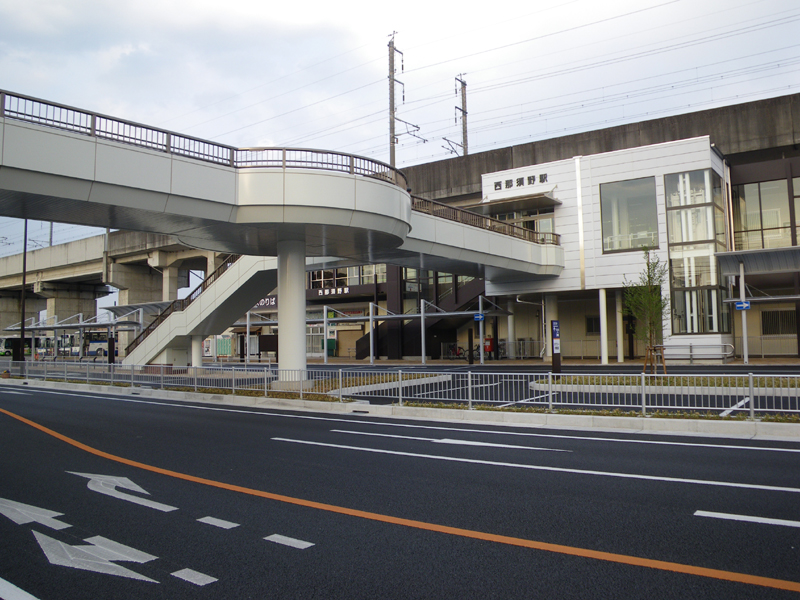
- Nishi-Nasuno Station, May 2010

General information
- Location: 1 Nagatachō, Nasushiobara-shi, Tochigi-ken 329-2727; Japan
- Coordinates: 36°53′3″N 139°59′11″E
- Operator: JR East
- Line: Tōhoku Main Line
- Distance: 151.8 km from Tokyo
- Platforms: 1 side + 1 island platform
- Connections: Bus stop

Other information
- Status: Staffed
- Website: Official website

History
- Opened: 1 October 1886.

Passengers
- FY2019: 3740 daily

Services
Preceding station	JR East	Following station
Nozaki towards Tokyo	Utsunomiya Line Local	Nasushiobara towards Kuroiso
Location
- Location within Tochigi Prefecture Location within Japan

Nishi-Nasuno Station (西那須野駅, Nishi-Nasuno-eki) is a railway station in the city of Nasushiobara, Tochigi, Japan, operated by the East Japan Railway Company (JR East).

== Lines ==
Nishi-Nasuno Station is served by the Utsunomiya Line (Tohoku Main Line), and lies 151.8 kilometers from the starting point of the line at Tokyo.

== Station layout ==
This station has an elevated station building with one island platform and one side platform underneath; however, platform 2 is not in use. The station is staffed.

=== Platforms ===
1	■ Utsunomiya Line	for Nasushiobara and Kuroiso
3	■ Utsunomiya Line (Ueno-Tokyo Line)	for Utsunomiya, Ōmiya, Ueno, Tokyo, Yokohama, Atami (via Tokaido Line)

== History ==
Nishi-Nasuno Station opened on 1 October 1886. With the privatization of JNR on 1 April 1987, the station came under the control of JR East.

== Passenger statistics ==
In fiscal 2019, the station was used by an average of 3740 passengers daily (boarding passengers only).

== Buses ==
Bus stop	No	Via	Destination	Company	Note
West Gate	Shiobara Line	AgriPal Shiobara・Yūnohara	Shiobara Onsen Bus Terminal	Nasushiobara Community Bus	Passengers who have Japan Rail Pass are able to ride on the bus route at free.
West Gate	Shiobara Line		Nasu-Shiobara Station	Nasushiobara Community Bus	Passengers who have Japan Rail Pass are able to ride on the bus route at free.
West Gate	Yū Bus Nishi-Nasuno Circular Line	International University of Health and Welfare Hospital	Nishi-Nasuno Station East Gate	Nasushiobara Community Bus	Passengers are able to pursue the 1 diary ticket at 400 yen. What is more, the 1 diary ticket for being able to use Otawara Municipal Bus and Nasushiobara Community Bus is sold at 700 yen.
West Gate	Yū Bus Nishi-Nasuno Circular Line	Nogi Shrine	Nishi-Nasuno Station East Gate	Nasushiobara Community Bus	Passengers are able to pursue the 1 diary ticket at 400 yen. What is more, the 1 diary ticket for being able to use Otawara Municipal Bus and Nasushiobara Community Bus is sold at 700 yen.
West Gate	Yū Bus Nishi-Nasuno・Kuroiso Line		Nasu-Shiobara Station	Nasushiobara Community Bus	Passengers are able to pursue the 1 diary ticket at 400 yen. What is more, the 1 diary ticket for being able to use Otawara Municipal Bus and Nasushiobara Community Bus is sold at 700 yen.
West Gate	Yū Bus Nishi-Nasuno・Kuroiso Line		Kuroiso Station	Nasushiobara Community Bus	Passengers are able to pursue the 1 diary ticket at 400 yen. What is more, the 1 diary ticket for being able to use Otawara Municipal Bus and Nasushiobara Community Bus is sold at 700 yen.

Bus stop	No	Via	Destination	Company	Note
East Gate	Ōtawara・Batō Line	Nakagawa Village Hall	Batō Shako	Kantō Bus	
East Gate	Odawara・Batō Line		Ōtawara Office	Kantō Bus	
East Gate	Kuroha Line	International University of Health and Welfare	Gohō no yu	Kantō Bus	
East Gate	Kuroha Line	International University of Health and Welfare	Kuroha Office	Kantō Bus	
East Gate	Kuroha Line	International University of Health and Welfare	Nasu Japanese Red Cross Society Hospital	Kantō Bus	
East Gate	Ōtawara Municipal Bus	Tōbū Department Store・Nasu Japanese Red Cross Society Hospital	Ōdawa Municipal Government	Ōtawara Municipal Bus	

== Surrounding area ==
- Nishi-Nasuno Post Office
- Former Nishi-Nasuno Town Hall
- National Route 4
- National Route 400
- International University of Health and Welfare

== See also ==
- List of railway stations in Japan
