= Higashi-Washinomiya Station =

Railway station in Kuki, Saitama Prefecture, Japan

Higashi-Washinomiya Station 東鷲宮駅
- Higashi-Washinomiya Station west exit, January 2026

General information
- Location: 326 Nishiowa, Kuki-shi, Saitama-ken 340-0206; Japan
- Coordinates: 36°5′22.0236″N 139°40′45.26″E
- Operator: JR East; JR Freight
- Line: Tōhoku Main Line
- Distance: 51.6 km from Tokyo.
- Platforms: 2 side platforms

Other information
- Status: Staffed
- Website: www.jreast.co.jp/estation/station/info.aspx?StationCd=1310

History
- Opened: 15 April 1981

Passengers
- FY2019: 9,750

Services
Preceding station	JR East	Following station
Kuki towards Tokyo	Utsunomiya Line Local	Kurihashi towards Kuroiso
Kuki towards Zushi	Shōnan–Shinjuku Line Local	Kurihashi towards Utsunomiya
Location
- Location within Saitama Prefecture Location within Japan

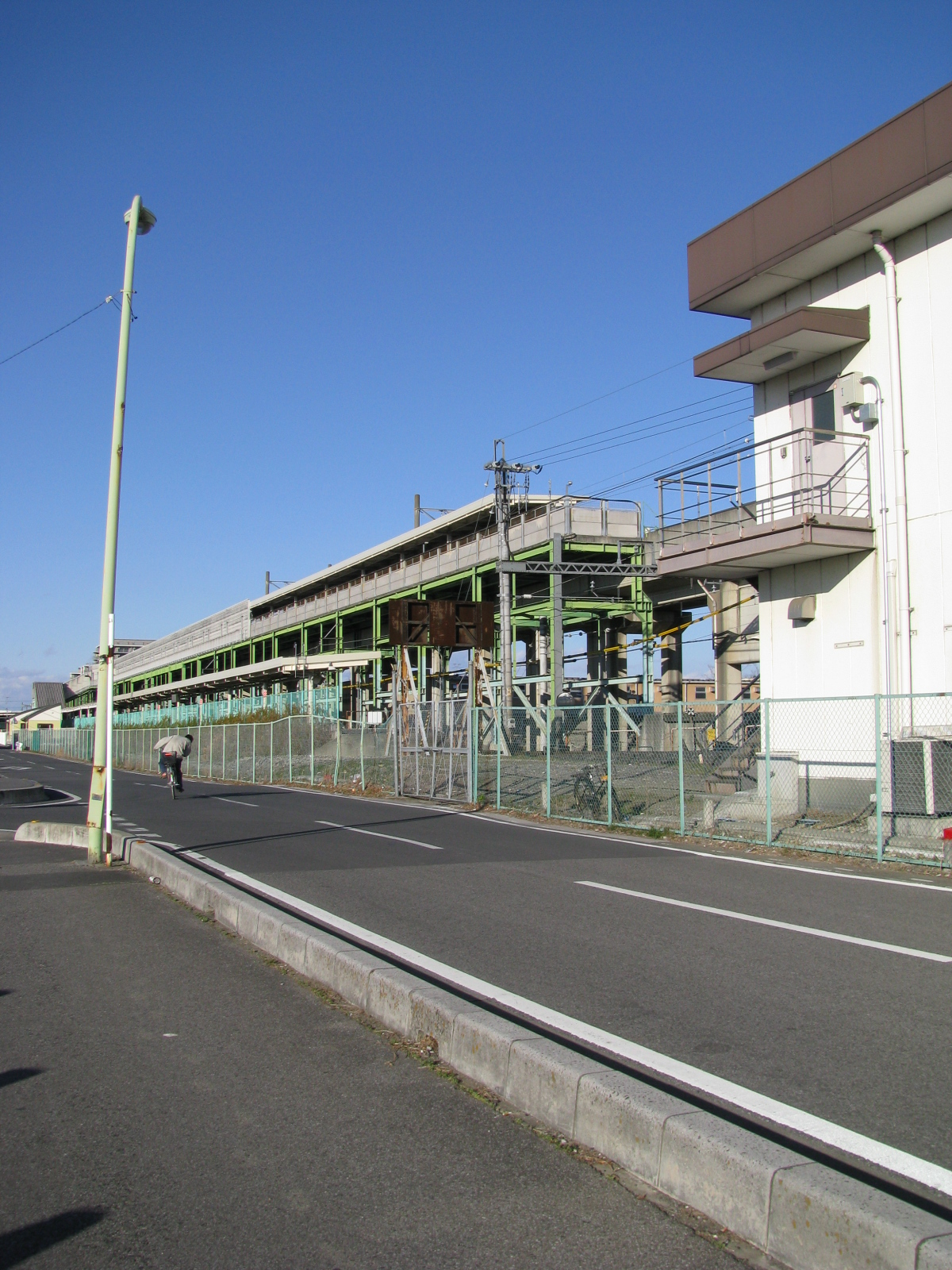
Staggered platforms of Higashi-Washinomiya Station

Higashi-Washinomiya Station (東鷲宮駅, Higashi-Washinomiya-eki) is a passenger railway station located in the city of Kuki, Saitama, Japan, operated by East Japan Railway Company (JR East). It is also a freight depot for the Japan Freight Railway Company (JR Freight)

== Lines ==
Higashi-Washinomiya Station is served by the Tōhoku Main Line (Utsunomiya Line) and the Shōnan-Shinjuku Line, and lies 51.6 kilometers from the starting point of the line at Tokyo.

== Station layout ==
This station has two opposed side platforms, however, with an unusual layout in that the platforms are not on the same level. Utsunomiya-bound trains stop at a ground level side-platform serving one track. Ōmiya-bound trains stop at an elevated side-platform serving one track. The station is staffed.

=== Platforms ===
1	■ Utsunomiya Line	for Oyama, Utsunomiya, Kuroiso
2	■ Utsunomiya Line (Ueno-Tokyo Line)	for Ōmiya, Ueno, Tokyo, Yokohama, Atami, Numazu and Ito (via Tōkaidō Line and Itō Line)
2	■ Shōnan–Shinjuku Line	for Ōmiya, Shinjuku, Yokohama, Ōfuna and Zushi (via Yokosuka Line)

== History ==
Higashi-Washinomiya Station opened on 15 April 1981 as a freight station, and opened for passenger service from 23 June 1982. With the privatization of JNR on 1 April 1987, the station came under the control of JR East.

== Passenger statistics ==
In fiscal 2019, the station was used by an average of 9,750 passengers daily (boarding passengers only).

== Surrounding area ==
- Higashi-Washinomiya Hyaku-Kannon Onsen

== See also ==
- List of railway stations in Japan
