= Kurihashi Station =

Railway station in Kuki, Saitama Prefecture, Japan

TN04 Kurihashi Station 栗橋駅
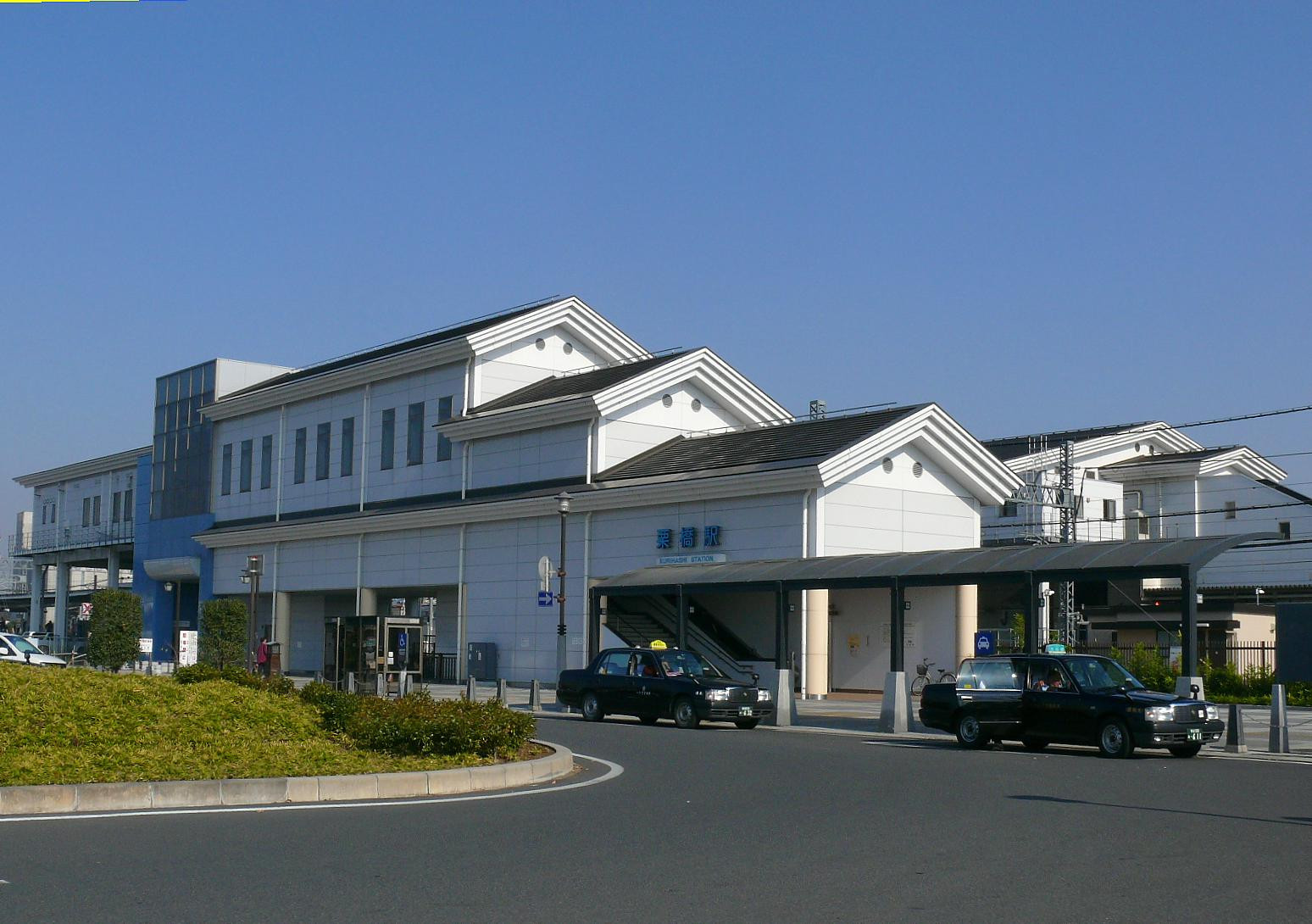
- The west side of Kurihashi Station in December 2007

General information
- Location: 1-1-1 Kurihashi, Kuki-shi, Saitama-ken 349-1101 (JR East); 1202-2 Izaka, Kuki-shi, Saitama-ken (Tobu); Japan
- Coordinates: 36°8′12.4584″N 139°41′39.15″E
- Operator: JR East; Tōbu Railway
- Lines: Tōhoku Main Line; Tōbu Nikkō Line
- Distance: 57.3 km from Tokyo (JR East); 13.9 km from Tōbu-Dōbutsu-Kōen (Tobu)
- Platforms: 1 side + 1 island platform (JR East); 1 island platform (Tobu)

Other information
- Station code: TN-04 (Tobu)

History
- Opened: 16 July 1885; 1 April 1929 (Tobu)

Passengers
- FY2019: 12,297 daily (JR East); 11,628 daily (Tobu)

Services
Preceding station	JR East	Following station
Higashi-Washinomiya towards Tokyo	Utsunomiya Line Local	Koga towards Kuroiso
Higashi-Washinomiya towards Zushi	Shōnan–Shinjuku Line Local	Koga towards Utsunomiya
Preceding station	Tobu Railway	Following station
Minami-Kurihashi TN03 Terminus	Nikkō Line Express	Itakura Tōyōdai-mae TN07 towards Tōbu–Nikkō
Minami-Kurihashi TN03 towards Tōbu-Dōbutsu-Kōen	Nikkō Line Local	Shin-Koga TN05 towards Tōbu–Nikkō
Location
- Location within Saitama Prefecture Location within Japan

Kurihashi Station (栗橋駅, Kurihashi-eki) is a passenger railway station located in the city of Kuki, Saitama, Japan, operated jointly by East Japan Railway Company (JR East) and the private railway operator Tobu Railway.

== Lines ==
Kurihashi Station is served by the Tōbu Nikkō Line, and is 13.9 km from the starting point of the Nikko Line at Tōbu-Dōbutsu-Kōen. It is also a station on the JR East Tōhoku Main Line (Utsunomiya Line) and is 57.3 km from the starting point of that line at Tokyo Station. There is a track linking the Tōbu and JR lines, used by the through-running Nikkō and Kinugawa services. The linking track has a pair of small platforms for crew changes, but no passenger facilities.

== Station layout ==
=== JR East station ===
The JR East station consists of one island platform and one side platform serving three tracks, connected to the station building by a footbridge. The station has a "Midori no Madoguchi" staffed ticket office.

1	■ Utsunomiya Line (Ueno-Tokyo Line)	for Ōmiya, Ueno, Tokyo, Yokohama, Atami, Numazu and Itō (via Tōkaidō Line and Itō Line)
1	■ Shōnan–Shinjuku Line	for Ōmiya, Shinjuku, Yokohama, Ōfuna and Zushi (via Yokosuka Line)
3	■ Utsunomiya Line	for Oyama, Utsunomiya, Kuroiso

=== Tōbu Railway station ===
The Tōbu Railway station consists of one island platform serving two tracks, with an elevated station building located above the platform.

=== Platforms ===
1	■ Tōbu Nikkō Line	for Minami-Kurihashi , Kita-Senju, and Asakusa
2	■ Tōbu Nikkō Line	for Shin-Tochigi, and Tōbu Nikkō

== History ==
The JR East Tōhoku Line (Utsunomiya Line) station opened on 16 July 1885. The Tōbu station opened on 1 April 1929.

From 17 March 2012, station numbering was introduced on all Tōbu lines, with Kurihashi Station becoming "TN-04".

== Passenger statistics ==
In fiscal 2019, the JR East station was used by an average of 12,427 passengers daily (boarding passengers only). In fiscal 2019, the Tobu portion of the station was used by an average of 11,628 passengers daily (boarding passengers only).

== Surrounding area ==
- Kurihashi Post Office

== See also ==
- List of railway stations in Japan
