= Jichi Medical University =

Coordinates: 36°23′59.1″N 139°51′37.9″E

- 自治医科大学
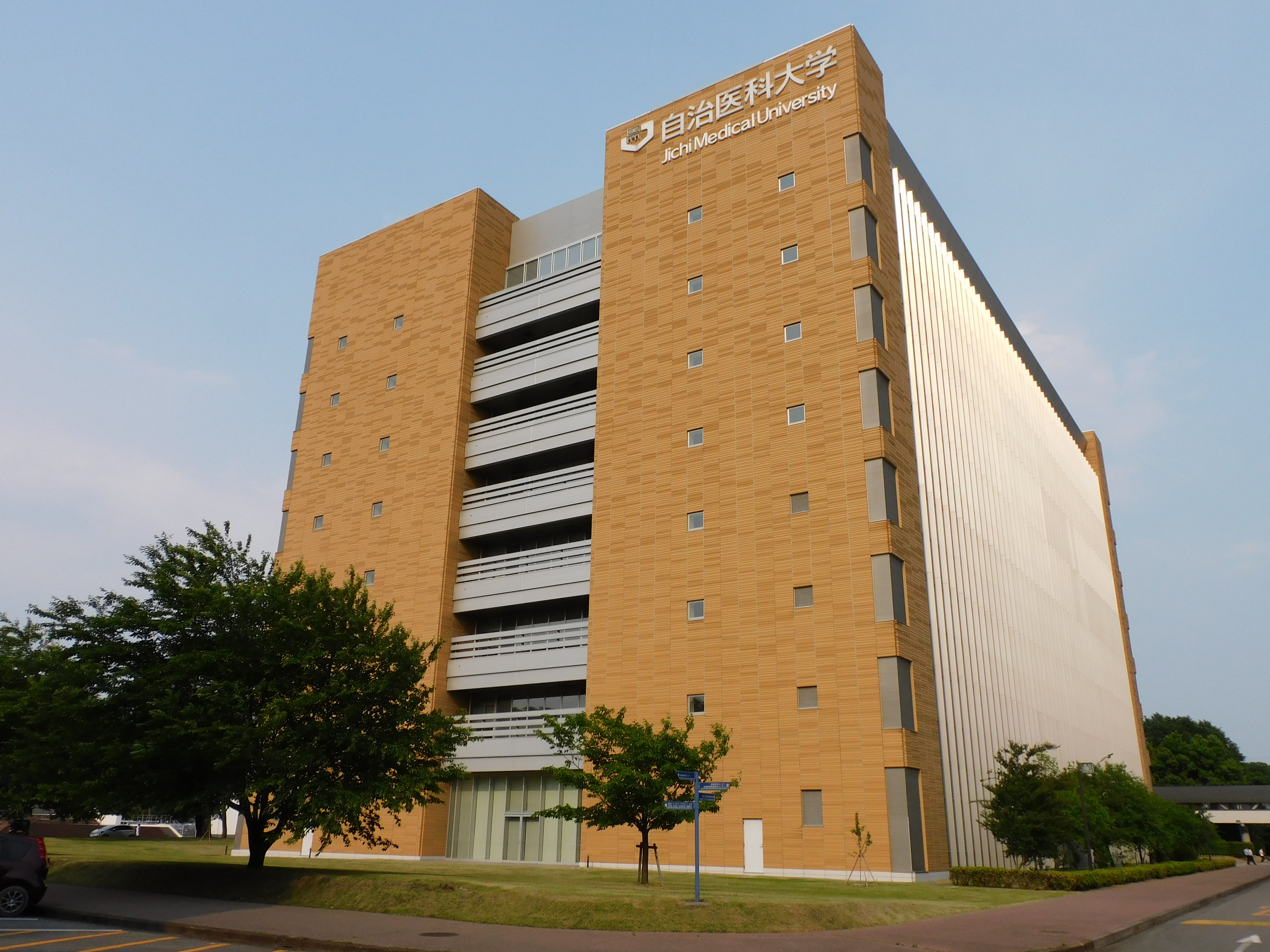
- Jichi Medical University Education & Research Center
- Established: 1972
- Location: Shimotsuke, Tochigi, Japan
- Website: https://www.jichi.ac.jp/english/index.html

Jichi Medical University (自治医科大学, Jichi ika daigaku) is a private university in Shimotsuke, Tochigi, Japan, established in 1972. In 2008 the Gates Foundation awarded $100,000 to Hiroyuki Matsuoka, a medical researcher at the university, to do research on flying syringes. It is served by Jichi Medical University Station.

== Scholarship loan system and litigation ==
Jichi Medical University was founded in 1972 by Japan's 47 prefectures to train physicians for rural and underserved areas. Under its scholarship loan system, students receive loans covering tuition and related expenses during their studies. In return, graduates are required to work for nine years—one and a half times the six-year loan period—at public hospitals and other institutions designated by their home prefecture. If a graduate completes this service, repayment of the loan is waived; if a graduate leaves the designated service early, the loan must be repaid in a lump sum together with damages set at 10 percent per year.

In March 2025, a graduate of the university filed a lawsuit against the university and Aichi Prefecture in the Tokyo District Court, seeking a declaration that his repayment obligation does not exist and claiming state redress. The plaintiff, physician Hajime Nakamura, had received loans of ¥26.6 million; after he left his designated post, the university demanded lump-sum repayment of ¥37.66 million, including ¥11.06 million in damages. The plaintiff argues that the system violates Article 22(1) of the Constitution of Japan (freedom of residence and movement), because the university and the prefecture unilaterally designate the hospital at which a graduate must work; Articles 14 and 16 of the Labour Standards Act, which limit the duration of employment contracts and prohibit contractual penalties for non-performance; and Articles 9 and 10 of the Consumer Contract Act, because damages of 10 percent per year exceed the statutory interest rate and the average loss the university could suffer. The university responded that the loan system, under which repayment is waived in exchange for a fixed period of service in regional medicine in the graduate's home prefecture, is "reasonable and important for securing regional medical care" and complies with the relevant laws, and that it would contest the claim. The case has attracted attention in South Korea, where it has been covered in depth by the medical newspaper MEDIGATE News—including an interview with the plaintiff—as a reference point in the debate over South Korea's new regional physician system.

A related case concerning a similar prefectural scholarship scheme has already produced a final judgment. In January 2026, the Kofu District Court held the penalty clause in Yamanashi Prefecture's regional quota programme—under which doctors who left the programme early owed a penalty of up to ¥8.424 million in addition to repaying their loans—void under the Consumer Contract Act, in a consumer-organisation lawsuit brought by the Consumers Organization of Japan. The prefecture withdrew its appeal in July 2026, making the judgment final, and subsequently abolished the penalty clause.
