= Utsunomiya Line =

Railway line in Japan

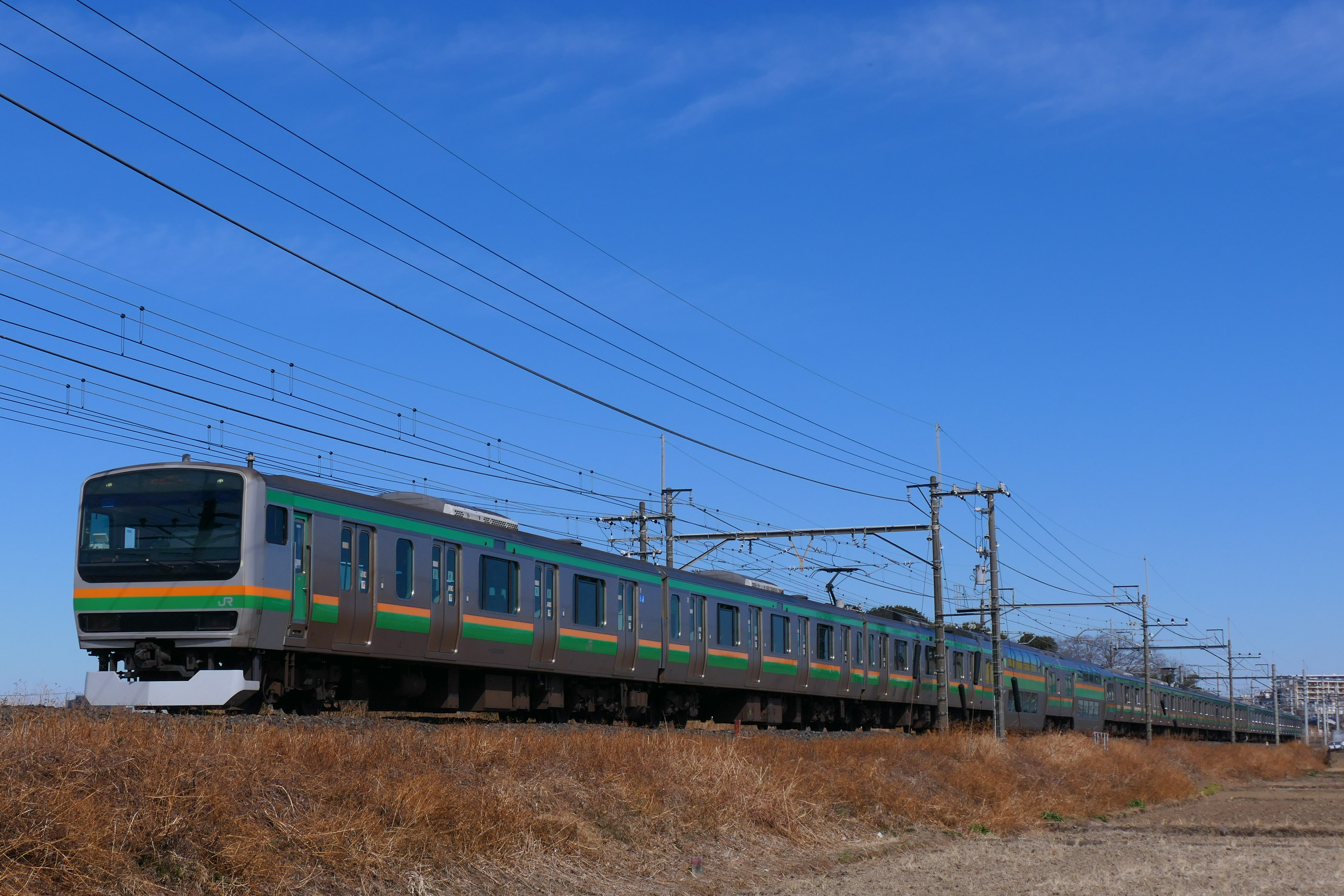
- E231-1000 series EMU between Higashi-Ōmiya and Hasuda

Overview
- Locale: Tokyo; Saitama, Tochigi, Ibaraki prefectures
- Termini: Tokyo; Kuroiso
- Stations: 34

Service
- Type: Heavy rail
- Operator(s): JR East
- Depot(s): Oyama

History
- Opened: 28 July 1883; 142 years ago

Technical
- Line length: 163.5 km (101.6 mi)
- Number of tracks: 2
- Track gauge: 1,067 mm (3 ft 6 in)
- Electrification: Overhead line, 1,500 V DC
- Operating speed: 120 km/h (75 mph)
- Train protection system: ATS-P

The Utsunomiya Line (Japanese: 宇都宮線, Hepburn: Utsunomiya-sen) is the service name used by East Japan Railway Company (JR East) for the 163.5-kilometer (101.6 mi) section of the Tōhoku Main Line between Tokyo Station in Tokyo and Kuroiso Station in Nasushiobara, Tochigi, Japan. In regular service, the remaining northern section of the Tōhoku Main Line is referred to as the Tōhoku Line. Separate service names are used because the line is electrified at 1,500 V DC south of Kuroiso and 20 kV 50 Hz AC north of the station, meaning there are no regularly scheduled passenger services operating through Kuroiso Station.

== Services ==
Services on the Utsunomiya Line are typically divided into three categories: services to or from Ueno, Shōnan–Shinjuku Line services, and Ueno–Tokyo Line services. Between Ueno and Ōmiya, trains share the track with the Takasaki Line, both of which serve as de facto express services compared to the parallel Keihin–Tōhoku Line.

- Northbound services mostly terminate at Utsunomiya or Koganei, with some at Koga.
- Southbound trains mostly travel through to either the Shōnan–Shinjuku Line to Zushi on the Yokosuka Line, or the Ueno–Tokyo Line to either Shinagawa, Ōfuna, Odawara, Hiratsuka, Kozu, Odawara, Atami, or Itō on the Tōkaidō Line, with a few trains terminating at Ueno.

The fastest service on the line, the rapid Rabbit, makes the run between Ueno and Utsunomiya in 1 hour and 26 minutes.

Service on the line is generally divided at Utsunomiya, though the number of through trains had been increasing steadily over the years. South of Utsunomiya, 10- and 15-car E231-1000/E233-3000 series four-door suburban commuter EMUs with Green cars attached service the line, while to the north service was provided chiefly by 4-car 205-600 series four-door EMUs. Starting 12 March 2022, all services north of Utsunomiya until Kuroiso use E131-600/-680 series EMUs, and through services using suburban 10/15-car trains ceased to operate.

=== Limited express ===
Limited express services use the line, including:

- Nikkō / Spacia Nikkō / Kinugawa / Spacia Kinugawa (from Ikebukuro/Shinjuku to Kurihashi and on to the Tōbu Nikkō Line)

=== Local/rapid services ===
==== Rapid Rabbit ====
Since March 2015, Rapid Rabbit services now run from Kōzu on the Tōkaidō Line, through the Ueno–Tokyo Line, to Utsunomiya. This service stops at every station on the Tōkaidō Line, and skips some stations on the Utsunomiya Line. Rabbit trains were first operated by the Japanese National Railways as an hourly/half-hourly rapid service. From October 2004, Rabbit services ran only twice during the morning; on weekends, they replaced the weekday commuter rapid service. From March 2021, the commuter rapid service was consolidated into the rapid Rabbit service, which now operate two trains one-way from the Tōkaidō Line (one from Odawara and one from Kōzu) to Utsunomiya in the morning, and between three and five trains each way between Ueno and Utsunomiya in the evening. From the start of March 2024 timetable revision, all southbound Rabbit services to Ueno were discontinued, resulting in these services fully becoming one-way operation. Following this, evening northbound services were reduced to two trains from Ueno to Utsunomiya.

Southbound rapid services are exclusively ran on the Shōnan–Shinjuku Line, terminating at Zushi.

==== Local ====
- Northbound local trains terminate at either Koga, Koganei, or Utsunomiya. The first train leaves Ueno during the 5 o'clock hour in the morning, and the last train leaves Tokyo during the 11 o'clock hour.
- During the morning peak (7/8 o'clock hour), Ueno-bound trains run at intervals of 4–6 minutes. Most trains continue south to the Tōkaidō Line through the Ueno–Tokyo Line, while some trains terminate at Ueno.

=== Shōnan–Shinjuku Line services ===
Within the Utsunomiya Line, Shōnan–Shinjuku Line rapid and local trains are each operated once per hour. They do not stop at Saitama-Shintoshin Station since it has no platforms available. They operate between Zushi on the Yokosuka Line and Utsunomiya.

==== Rapid ====
Rapid trains operate once hourly, making limited stops. The travel time between Shinjuku and Utsunomiya is about 1 hour and 35 minutes.

==== Local ====
Local trains operate once hourly (twice hourly during the morning), stopping at all stations. The travel time between Shinjuku and Ōmiya is about 32 minutes.

=== Utsunomiya – Kuroiso services ===
Between Utsunomiya and Kuroiso, local trains stop at every station. Trains operate approximately two times per hour, traveling between Utsunomiya and Kuroiso in approximately 50 minutes. All trains use E131-600/-680 series EMUs.

=== Past services ===
==== Commuter rapid ====
Commuter rapid services for Utsunomiya made fewer stops than the Rabbit rapid services. They were operated only on weekday evenings, between Ueno and Utsunomiya. Trains departed Ueno between 18:00 and 22:00, and Utsunomiya between 16:00 and 21:00, with approximately one round-trip per hour. All trains were E231/E233 series 10- or 15-car EMUs. This service ended on 12 March 2021.

==== Rapid Acty ====
From March 2015, with the Ueno–Tokyo Line opening, Tōkaidō Line Rapid Acty services ran up along the Utsunomiya Line. Services stopped at every station on the Utsunomiya Line, and skipped some stations on the Tōkaidō Line. Since 13 March 2021, Acty services stopped running through to the Utsunomiya Line.

==== Limited Express ====
- Ohayō Tochigi・Hometown Tochigi
- Hokutosei, Cassiopeia (once or twice daily night trains)

==== Home Liner Koga ====
Two trains bound for Koga depart Ueno every weekday evening. Passengers can board only at Ueno; all other stations are for disembarking only. Stops include: Ueno, Urawa, Ōmiya, Higashi-Ōmiya, Hasuda, Kuki, and Koga. Service is provided by 7-car 185 series and 9-car 489 series EMUs.

== Station list ==
- Local trains, excluding Shōnan–Shinjuku Line through trains, stop at all stations within the Utsunomiya Line (except Nippori)
- For limited express services, please see their respective articles.

Legends:

- ● : All trains stop
- ｜: All trains pass (↓: Indicates the direction of Rapid Rabbit trains passing)
- ▼: Rapid Rabbit trains stop (Northbound only)
- ■: Shōnan–Shinjuku Line trains stop, but use dedicated platforms on the Tōhoku Freight Line
- ∥ : Shōnan–Shinjuku Line trains do not travel within this section

| Station | Japanese | Distance (km) | | | Local | Rapid Rabbit | Shōnan–Shinjuku Line | | Transfers | Location | |
| Station | Japanese | Between stations | From Tokyo | | Local | Rapid Rabbit | Shōnan–Shinjuku Line | | Transfers | Location | |
| Station | Japanese | Between stations | via Oku | via Ōji | Local | Rapid Rabbit | Local | Rapid | Transfers | Location | |
| Through services from/to: | | | | | Ueno–Tokyo Line for Tōkaidō Line and Itō Line | | Shōnan–Shinjuku Line (for Yokosuka Line) | | | | |
|---|---|---|---|---|---|---|---|---|---|---|---|
| Tokyo | 東京 | - | 0.0 | | ● | ▼ | ∥ | ∥ | Tōhoku Shinkansen; Hokkaido Shinkansen; Yamagata Shinkansen; Akita Shinkansen; Joetsu Shinkansen; Hokuriku Shinkansen; Tōkaidō Main Line (through service); Yamanote Line; Keihin–Tōhoku Line; Yokosuka Line, Sōbu Line (Rapid); Keiyō Line; Chūō Line (Rapid); Tokaido Shinkansen; Tokyo Metro Marunouchi Line | Chiyoda | Tokyo |
| Ueno | 上野 | 3.6 | 3.6 | | ● | ▼ | ∥ | ∥ | Tōhoku Shinkansen; Hokkaido Shinkansen; Yamagata Shinkansen; Akita Shinkansen; Joetsu Shinkansen; Hokuriku Shinkansen; Jōban Line; Keihin–Tōhoku Line; Takasaki Line; Yamanote Line; Tokyo Metro Ginza Line (G-16); Tokyo Metro Hibiya Line (H-18); Keisei Main Line (at Keisei Ueno Station) | Taitō | Tokyo |
| Nippori | 日暮里 | 2.2 | 5.8 | | ｜ | ↓ | ∥ | ∥ | | Arakawa | Tokyo |
| Oku; JU03 | 尾久 | 2.6 | 8.4 | - | ● | ↓ | ∥ | ∥ | | Kita | Tokyo |
| Akabane | 赤羽 | 5.0 | 13.4 | 13.2 | ● | ▼ | ■ | ■ | Shōnan–Shinjuku Line (Through services to Zushi); Keihin–Tōhoku Line; Saikyō Line | Kita | Tokyo |
| Urawa | 浦和 | 11.0 | 24.4 | 24.2 | ● | ▼ | ■ | ■ | Keihin–Tōhoku Line | Urawa-ku, Saitama | Saitama |
| Saitama-Shintoshin; JU06 | さいたま新都心 | 4.5 | 28.9 | 28.7 | ● | ↓ | ｜ | ｜ | Keihin–Tōhoku Line | Ōmiya-ku, Saitama | Saitama |
| Ōmiya | 大宮 | 1.6 | 30.5 | 30.3 | ● | ▼ | ● | ● | Tōhoku Shinkansen; Hokkaido Shinkansen; Yamagata Shinkansen; Akita Shinkansen; Joetsu Shinkansen; Hokuriku Shinkansen; Takasaki Line; Shōnan–Shinjuku Line; Keihin–Tōhoku Line; Saikyō Line; ■ Kawagoe Line; Tobu Urban Park Line; ■ New Shuttle | Ōmiya-ku, Saitama | Saitama |
| End of suburban section | | | | | | | | | | Ōmiya-ku, Saitama | Saitama |
| Toro | 土呂 | 3.0 | 33.5 | 33.3 | ● | ↓ | ● | ｜ | | Kita-ku, Saitama | Saitama |
| Higashi-Ōmiya | 東大宮 | 2.1 | 35.6 | 35.4 | ● | ▼ | ● | ● | | Minuma-ku, Saitama | Saitama |
| Hasuda | 蓮田 | 3.8 | 39.4 | 39.2 | ● | ▼ | ● | ● | | Hasuda | Saitama |
| Shiraoka | 白岡 | 4.3 | 43.7 | 43.5 | ● | ↓ | ● | ｜ | | Shiraoka | Saitama |
| Shin-Shiraoka | 新白岡 | 2.4 | 46.1 | 45.9 | ● | ↓ | ● | ｜ | | Shiraoka | Saitama |
| Kuki | 久喜 | 3.0 | 49.1 | 48.9 | ● | ▼ | ● | ● | Tōbu Isesaki Line | Kuki | Saitama |
| Higashi-Washinomiya | 東鷲宮 | 2.7 | 51.8 | 51.6 | ● | ↓ | ● | ｜ | | Kuki | Saitama |
| Kurihashi | 栗橋 | 5.6 | 57.4 | 57.2 | ● | ↓ | ● | ｜ | Tōbu Nikkō Line | Kuki | Saitama |
| Koga | 古河 | 7.5 | 64.9 | 64.7 | ● | ▼ | ● | ● | | Koga | Ibaraki |
| Nogi | 野木 | 4.7 | 69.6 | 69.4 | ● | ↓ | ● | ｜ | | Nogi, Shimotsuga District | Tochigi |
| Mamada | 間々田 | 3.9 | 73.5 | 73.3 | ● | ↓ | ● | ｜ | | Oyama | Tochigi |
| Oyama | 小山 | 7.3 | 80.8 | 80.6 | ● | ▼ | ● | ● | Tōhoku Shinkansen; Hokkaido Shinkansen; Yamagata Shinkansen; Akita Shinkansen; ■ Mito Line; ■ Ryōmō Line | Oyama | Tochigi |
| Koganei | 小金井 | 7.5 | 88.3 | 88.1 | ● | ▼ | ● | ● | | Shimotsuke | Tochigi |
| Jichi Medical University | 自治医大 | 2.6 | 90.9 | 90.7 | ● | ▼ | ● | ● | | Shimotsuke | Tochigi |
| Ishibashi | 石橋 | 4.7 | 95.6 | 95.4 | ● | ▼ | ● | ● | | Shimotsuke | Tochigi |
| Utsunomiya Freight Terminal | 宇都宮貨物ターミナル | 1.2 | 96.8 | 96.6 | ｜ | ↓ | ｜ | ｜ | | Kaminokawa, Kawachi District | Tochigi |
| Suzumenomiya | 雀宮 | 5.2 | 102.0 | 101.8 | ● | ▼ | ● | ● | | Utsunomiya | Tochigi |
| Utsunomiya | 宇都宮 | 7.7 | 109.7 | 109.5 | ● | ▼ | ● | ● | Tōhoku Shinkansen; Hokkaido Shinkansen; Yamagata Shinkansen; Akita Shinkansen; ■ Nikkō Line | Utsunomiya | Tochigi |
| Okamoto | 岡本 | 6.2 | 115.9 | 115.7 | ● | | | | | Utsunomiya | Tochigi |
| Hōshakuji | 宝積寺 | 5.5 | 121.4 | 121.2 | ● | | | | ■ Karasuyama Line (Note: Some Karasuyama Line trains run through to Utsunomiya.) | Takanezawa, Shioya District | Tochigi |
| Ujiie | 氏家 | 5.9 | 127.3 | 127.1 | ● | | | | | Sakura | Tochigi |
| Kamasusaka | 蒲須坂 | 4.5 | 131.8 | 131.6 | ● | | | | | Sakura | Tochigi |
| Kataoka | 片岡 | 3.9 | 135.7 | 135.5 | ● | | | | | Yaita | Tochigi |
| Yaita | 矢板 | 6.3 | 142.0 | 141.8 | ● | | | | | Yaita | Tochigi |
| Nozaki | 野崎 | 4.8 | 146.8 | 146.6 | ● | | | | | Ōtawara | Tochigi |
| Nishi-Nasuno | 西那須野 | 5.2 | 152.0 | 151.8 | ● | | | | | Nasushiobara | Tochigi |
| Nasushiobara | 那須塩原 | 6.0 | 158.0 | 157.8 | ● | | | | Tōhoku Shinkansen; Hokkaido Shinkansen; Yamagata Shinkansen; Akita Shinkansen | Nasushiobara | Tochigi |
| Kuroiso | 黒磯 | 5.5 | 163.5 | 163.3 | ● | | | | ■ Tōhoku Main Line (for Shirakawa and Kōriyama) | Nasushiobara | Tochigi |

== Rolling stock ==
=== Tokyo—Ueno—Utsunomiya ===
- E231-1000 series EMUs
- E233-3000 series EMUs

=== Oyama—Utsunomiya—Kuroiso ===
- E131-600/-680 series 3-car EMUs (since 12 March 2022)

=== Utsunomiya—Hōshakuji (Karasuyama Line through service) ===
- EV-E301 series BEMUs

=== Former rolling stock ===
==== Koganei—Utsunomiya—Kuroiso ====
- 205-600 series EMUs (until 11 March 2022)

From March 2013, a fleet of eight refurbished 4-car 205-600 series EMUs was phased in on Utsunomiya Line services between Utsunomiya and Kuroiso, replacing 211 series sets. These operated until 11 March 2022 when they were replaced by new build 3-car E131-600/-680 series EMUs.

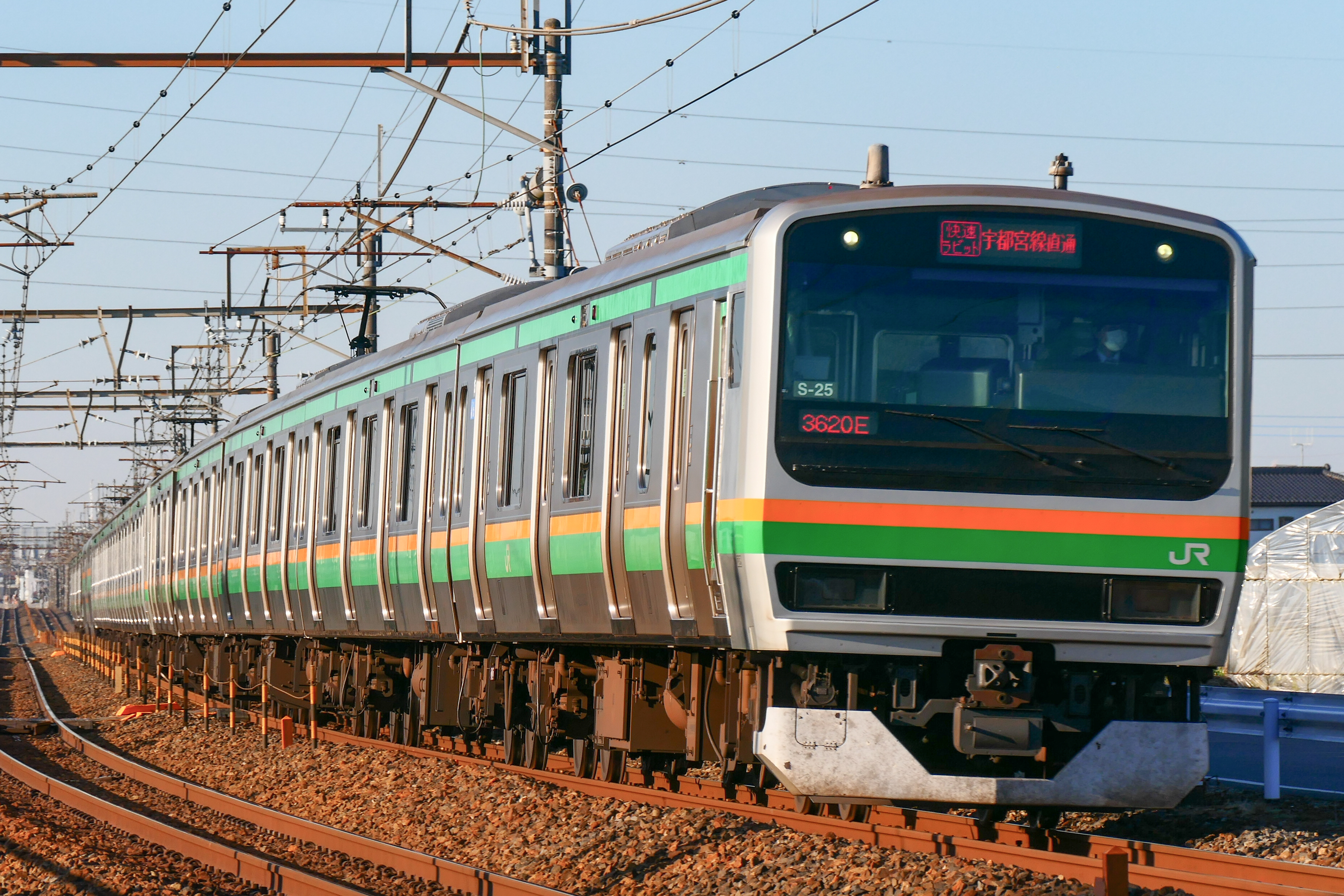
An E231-1000 series EMU

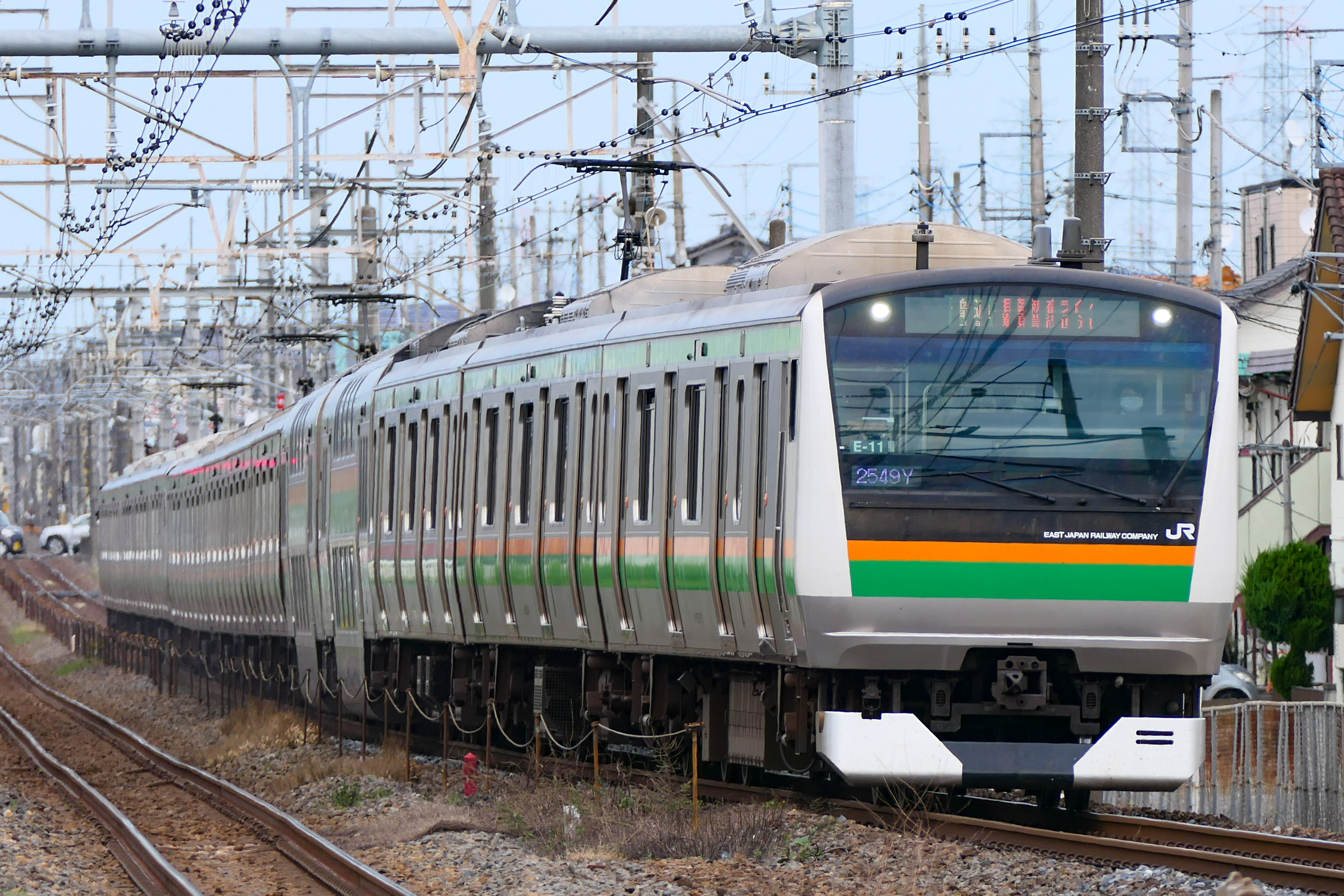
An E233-3000 series EMU

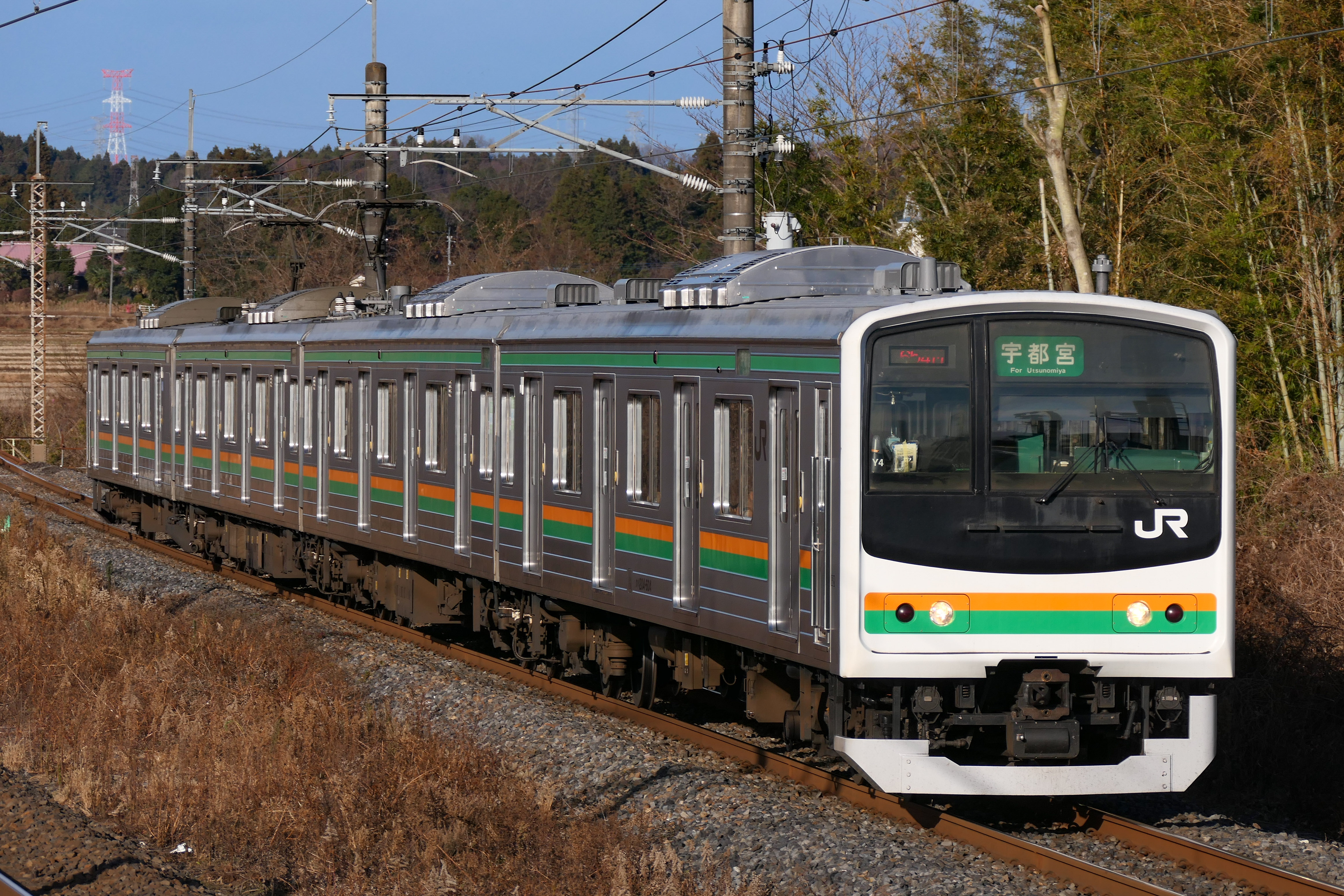
A 205-600 series EMU

== See also ==
- Tōhoku Main Line
- Takasaki Line
- Shōnan–Shinjuku Line
- Ueno–Tokyo Line
