= Nogi Station (Tochigi) =

Railway station in Nogi, Tochigi Prefecture, Japan

Nogi Station 野木駅
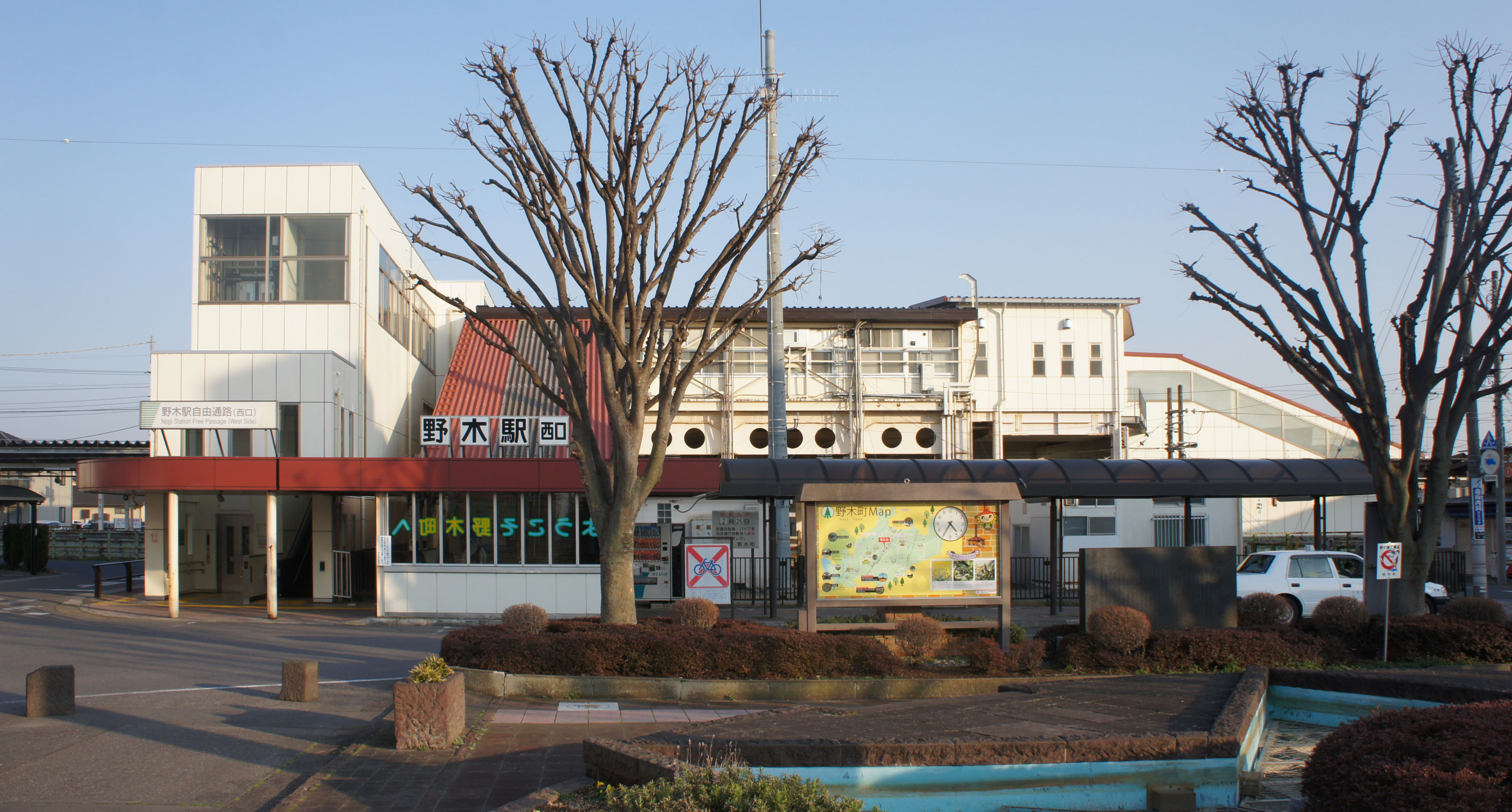
- Nogi Station west exit in March 2019

General information
- Location: Marubayashi, Nogi-machi, Shimotsuga-gun, Tochigi-ken 329-0111; Japan
- Coordinates: 36.2301°N 139.7347°E
- Operator: JR East
- Line: Tōhoku Main Line
- Distance: 69.4 km from Tokyo
- Platforms: 1 island platform
- Tracks: 2

Other information
- Status: Staffed
- Website: www.jreast.co.jp/estation/station/info.aspx?StationCd=1200

History
- Opened: 16 February 1963

Passengers
- FY2019: 4,619

Services
Preceding station	JR East	Following station
Koga towards Tokyo	Utsunomiya Line Local	Mamada towards Kuroiso
Koga towards Zushi	Shōnan–Shinjuku Line Local	Mamada towards Utsunomiya
Location
- Location within Tochigi Prefecture Location within Japan

Nogi Station (野木駅, Nogi-eki) is a railway station in the town of Nogi, Tochigi, Japan, operated by the East Japan Railway Company (JR East).

== Lines ==
Nogi Station is served by the Tōhoku Main Line (Utsunomiya Line), and is located 69.4 kilometers from the starting point of the line at Tokyo

== Station layout ==
The station consists of a single island platform, with an elevated station building. The station is staffed.

=== Platforms ===
1	■ Utsunomiya Line	for Oyama, Utsunomiya, Kuroiso
2	■ Utsunomiya Line (Ueno-Tokyo Line)	for Ōmiya, Ueno, Tokyo, Yokohama, Atami, Numazu and Ito (via Tokaido Line and Ito Line)
2	■ Shōnan–Shinjuku Line	for Ōmiya, Shinjuku, Yokohama, Ōfuna and Zushi (via Yokosuka Line)

== History ==
Nogi Station opened on 16 February 1963. On 1 April 1987 the station came under the control of JR East with the privatization of Japanese National Railways (JNR).

== Passenger statistics ==
In fiscal 2019, the station was used by an average of 4619 passengers daily (boarding passengers only).

== Surrounding area ==
- Nogi Town Hall
- Nogi Post Office

== See also ==
- List of railway stations in Japan
