= Shimotsuke, Tochigi =

Shimotsuke 下野市
- City
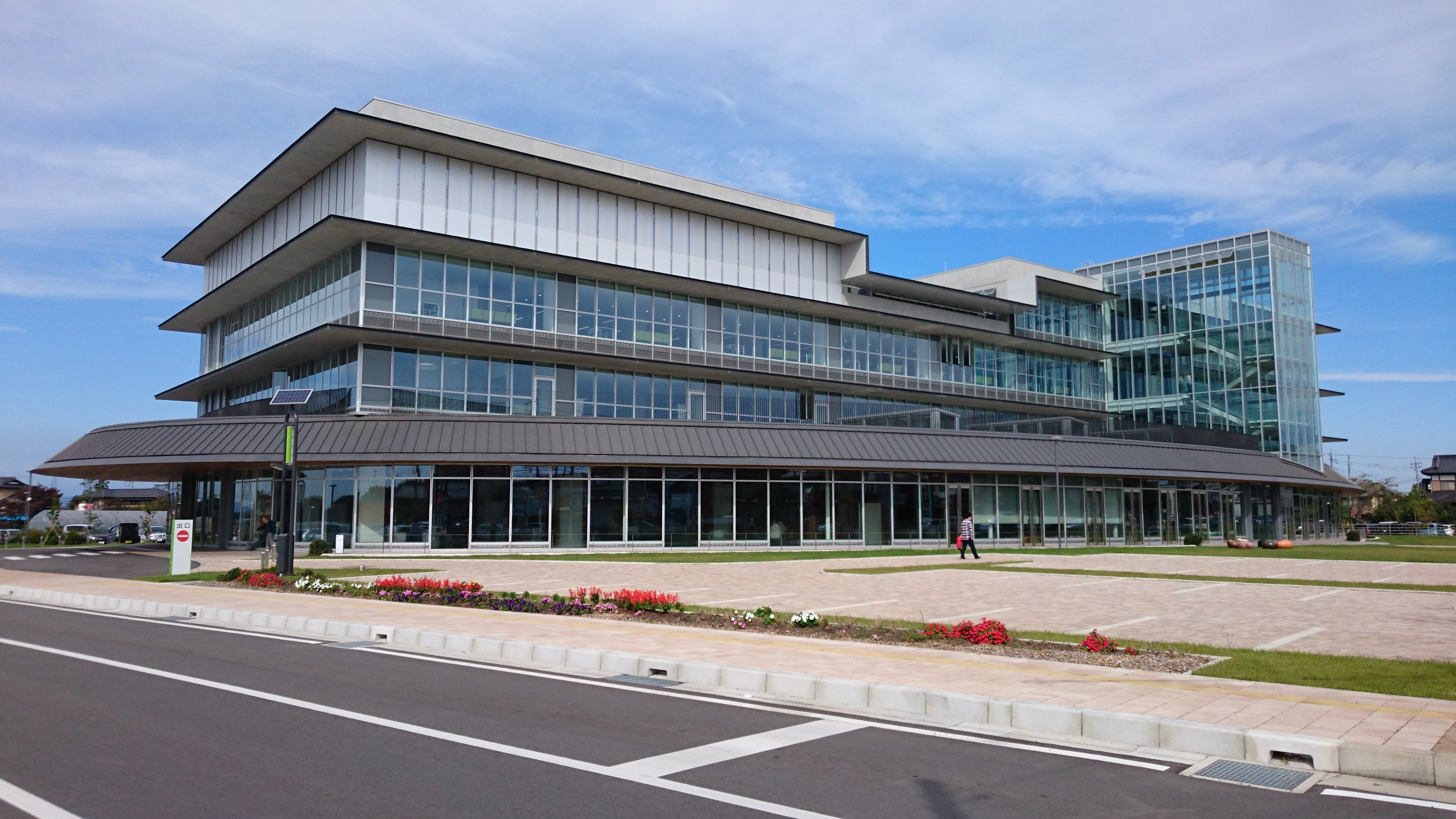
- Shimotsuke City Hall

- Flag Seal

- Location of Shimotsuke in Tochigi Prefecture

- Coordinates: 36°23′13.9″N 139°50′31.4″E
- Country: Japan
- Region: Kantō
- Prefecture: Tochigi

Government
  - Mayor: Toshio Hirose <広瀬寿雄> (from August 2006)

Area
  - Total: 74.59 km^{2} (28.80 sq mi)

Population (August 2020)
  - Total: 60,274
  - Density: 808.1/km^{2} (2,093/sq mi)
- Time zone: UTC+9 (Japan Standard Time)
- Tree: Zelkova serrata
- Flower: Calabash
- Bird: Japanese bush warbler
- Phone number: 0285-40-5551
- Address: 1127 Koganei, Shimotsuke-shi, Tochigi-ken 329-0492
- Website: Official website

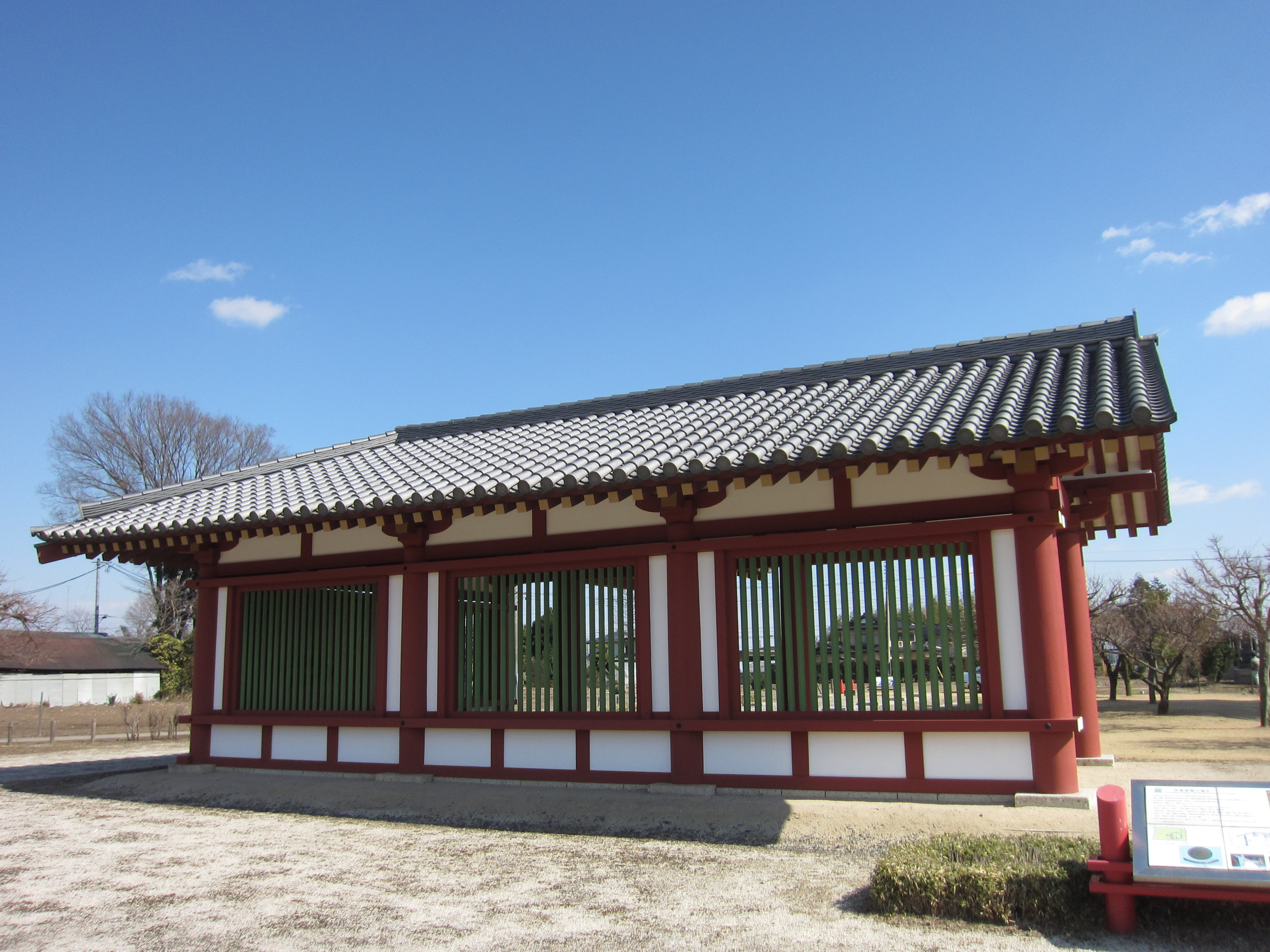
Reconstructed portion of Shimotsuke Kokubun-ji

Shimotsuke (下野市, Shimotsuke-shi; Japanese pronunciation: [ɕì.mó̞.t͡sɨ̥.kè̞, -ké̞.ɕì]) is a city located in Tochigi Prefecture, Japan. As of 1 August 2020, the city had an estimated population of 60,274 in 24,654 households, and a population density of 810 persons per km^{2}. The total area of the city is 74.59 square kilometres (28.80 sq mi).

== Geography ==
Shimotsuke is located in southern Tochigi Prefecture.

== Surrounding municipalities ==
Tochigi Prefecture

- Kaminokawa
- Mibu
- Mooka
- Oyama
- Tochigi
- Utsunomiya

== Climate ==
Shimotsuke has a humid subtropical climate (Köppen Cfa) characterized by warm summers and cold winters with heavy snowfall. The average annual temperature in Shimotsuke is 13.9 °C. The average annual rainfall is 1373 mm with September as the wettest month. The temperatures are highest on average in August, at around 26.2 °C, and lowest in January, at around 2.4 °C.

== Demographics ==
Per Japanese census data, the population of Shimotsuke has recently plateaued after a long period of growth.

Historical population
Year	Pop.	±%
1920	20,526	—
1930	23,069	+12.4%
1940	24,691	+7.0%
1950	33,491	+35.6%
1960	32,401	−3.3%
1970	36,471	+12.6%
1980	43,641	+19.7%
1990	46,673	+6.9%
2000	57,447	+23.1%
2010	59,464	+3.5%
2020	59,507	+0.1%

== History ==
The city of Shimotsuke was established on January 10, 2006, from the merger of the towns of Minamikawachi (from Kawachi District), and the towns of Kokubunji and Ishibashi (both from Shimotsuga District).

== Government ==
Shimotsuke has a mayor-council form of government with a directly elected mayor and a unicameral city legislature council of 18 members. Shimotsuke contributes one member to the Tochigi Prefectural Assembly. In terms of national politics, the city is divided between the Tochigi 1st district and the Tochigi 4th district of the lower house of the Diet of Japan.

== Economy ==
Agriculture and light manufacturing are mainstays of the local economy, with production of Kanpyō, turmeric and spinach being prominent local crops. The city is increasingly a bedroom community for neighboring Utsunomiya.

== Education ==
- Jichi Medical University
- Shimotsuke also has twelve public primary schools and two public middle schools operated by the town government. The town has one public high school operated by the Tochigi Prefectural Board of Education. The prefecture also operates one special education school for the handicapped.

== Transportation ==
=== Railway ===
JR East – Tōhoku Main Line (Utsunomiya Line)

- Koganei - Jichiidai - Ishibashi

=== Highway ===
- National Route 4
- National Route 352

== Local attractions ==
- Kabutozuka Kofun, National Historic Site
- Koganei Ichirizuka, National Historic Site
- Shimotsuke Kokubun-ji ruins, National Historic Site
- Shimotsuke Kokubunni-ji ruins, National Historic Site
- Shimotsuke Yakushi-ji temple and grave of Dōkyō, National Historic Site

== International relations ==
- Dietzhölztal, Hesse, Germany, friendship city

== Noted people from Shimotsuke ==
- Arisa Komiya, actress and voice actress
- Eiji Ochiai, professional baseball player
- Hanan, professional wrestler
- Hina, professional wrestler
- Rina, professional wrestler
