= Nasushiobara Station =

Railway station in Nasushiobara, Tochigi Prefecture, Japan

Nasushiobara Station 那須塩原駅
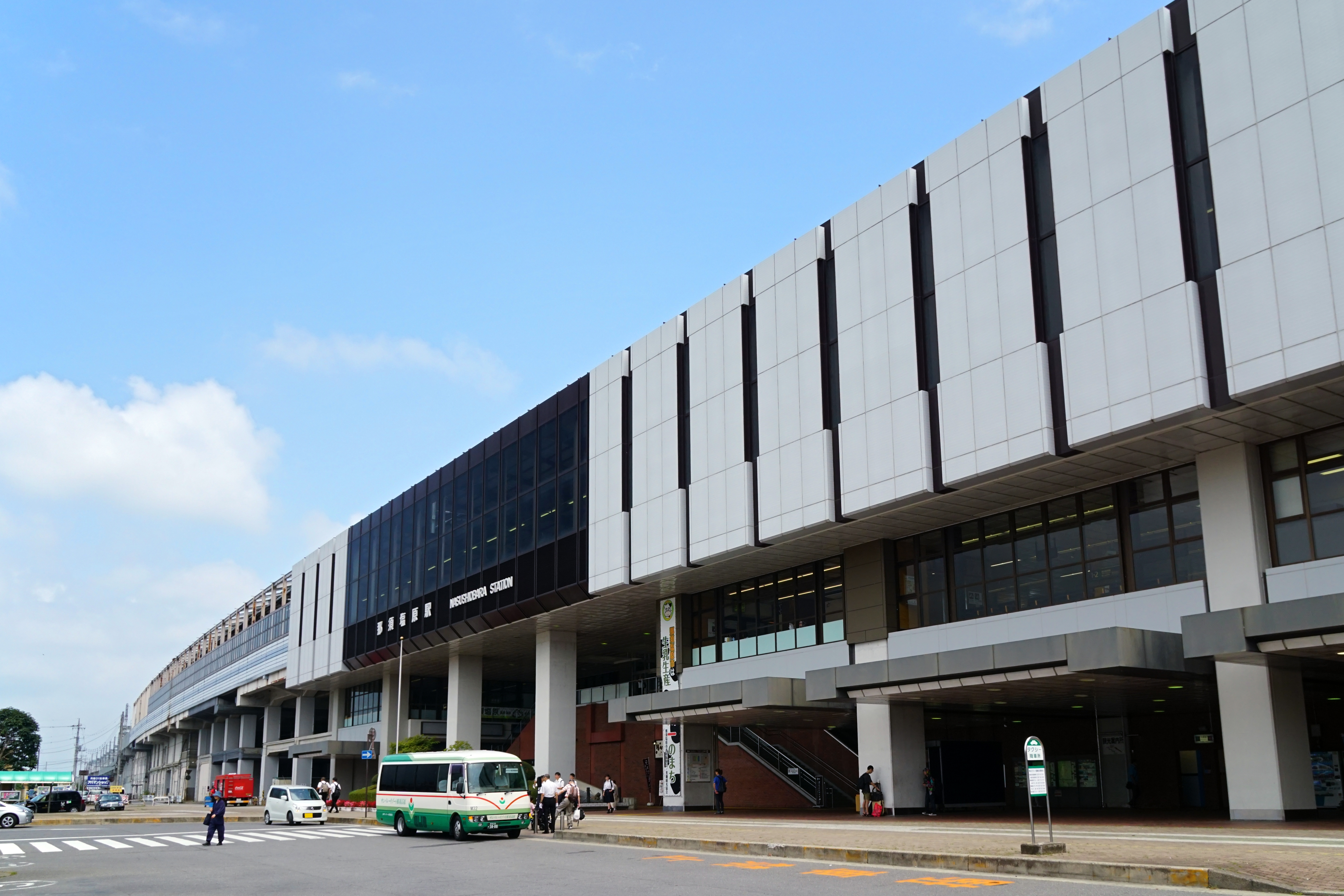
- Nasushiobara Station in July 2018

Japanese name
- Shinjitai: 那須塩原駅
- Kyūjitai: 那須鹽原驛
- Hiragana: なすしおばら

General information
- Location: 555 Ōharama, Nasushiobara City, Tochigi Prefecture; Japan
- Coordinates: 36.931678°N 140.020666°E
- Operator: JR East
- Lines: Tōhoku Shinkansen; Tōhoku Main Line
- Distance: 157.8 km (98.1 mi) from Tokyo
- Platforms: 2 side + 2 island platforms
- Connections: Bus stop

Other information
- Status: Staffed ("Midori no Madoguchi")
- Website: Official website

History
- Opened: 24 November 1898; 127 years ago
- Former names: Higashi-Nasuno (until 1982)

Passengers
- FY2020: 5,291 daily

Services
Preceding station	JR East	Following station
Utsunomiya towards Tokyo	Tōhoku Shinkansen Yamabiko	Shin-Shirakawa towards Morioka
Utsunomiya towards Tokyo	Tōhoku Shinkansen Nasuno	Shin-Shirakawa towards Kōriyama
Nishi-Nasuno towards Tokyo	Utsunomiya Line Local	Kuroiso Terminus
Location
- Location within Tochigi Prefecture Location within Japan

Nasushiobara Station (那須塩原駅, Nasushiobara-eki) is a railway station in the city of Nasushiobara, Tochigi, Japan, operated by the East Japan Railway Company (JR East).

== Lines ==
Nasushiobara Station is served by both the Utsunomiya Line (Tohoku Main Line) and the high-speed Tohoku Shinkansen, and lies 157.8 kilometers from the starting point of both lines at Tokyo.

== Station layout ==
This station has two elevated side platforms with the station building underneath for Tohoku Shinkansen services, and two ground-level island platforms serving three tracks for Utsunomiya Line services. The station has a Midori no Madoguchi staffed ticket office.

=== Platforms ===
1,2	■ Tohoku Shinkansen	for Kōriyama and Fukushima
5	■ Tohoku Shinkansen	for Utsunomiya, Ōmiya, and Tokyo
7	■ Utsunomiya Line	for Kuroiso
8	■ Utsunomiya Line (Ueno-Tokyo Line)	for Kuroiso for Utsunomiya, Ōmiya, Ueno, Tokyo, Yokohama, Atami (via Tokaido Line)
9	■ Utsunomiya Line (Ueno-Tokyo Line)	for Utsunomiya, Ōmiya, Ueno, Tokyo, Yokohama, Atami (via Tokaido Line)

== History ==
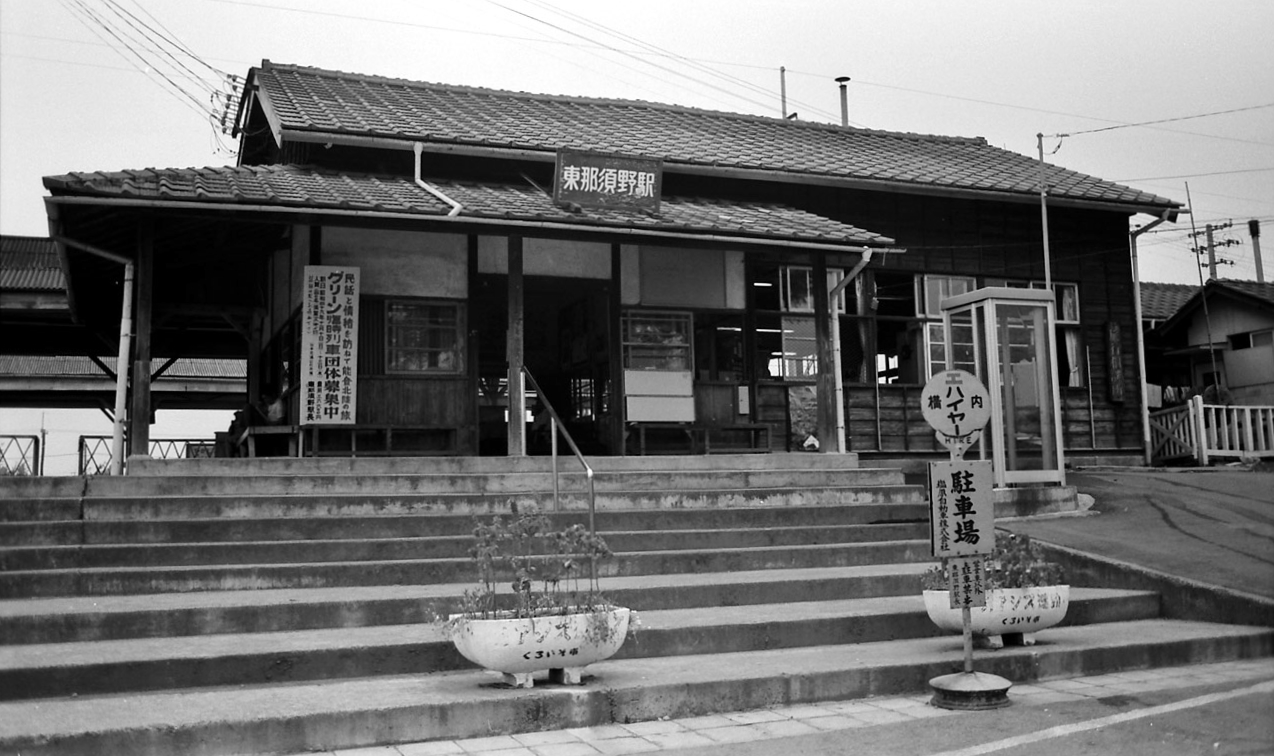
Higashi-Nasuno Station in the 1970s

The station opened on November 24, 1898, originally named Higashi-Nasuno Station (東那須野駅). From October 12, 1909, the station became part of the Tohoku Main Line.

On June 23, 1982, the Tohoku Shinkansen opened, and the station was renamed Nasushiobara (albeit with a different romanization).

== Passenger statistics ==
In fiscal 2019, the station was used by an average of 5291 passengers daily (boarding passengers only). The Tohoku Shinkansen portion of the station was used by an average of 3371 passengers daily (boarding passengers only).

== Surrounding area ==
=== Highway ===
- National Route 4
- Nasushiobara Post Office
- Nasushiobara Park

== See also ==
- List of railway stations in Japan
