= Kuroiso Station =

Railway station in Nasushiobara, Tochigi Prefecture, Japan

Kuroiso Station 黒磯駅
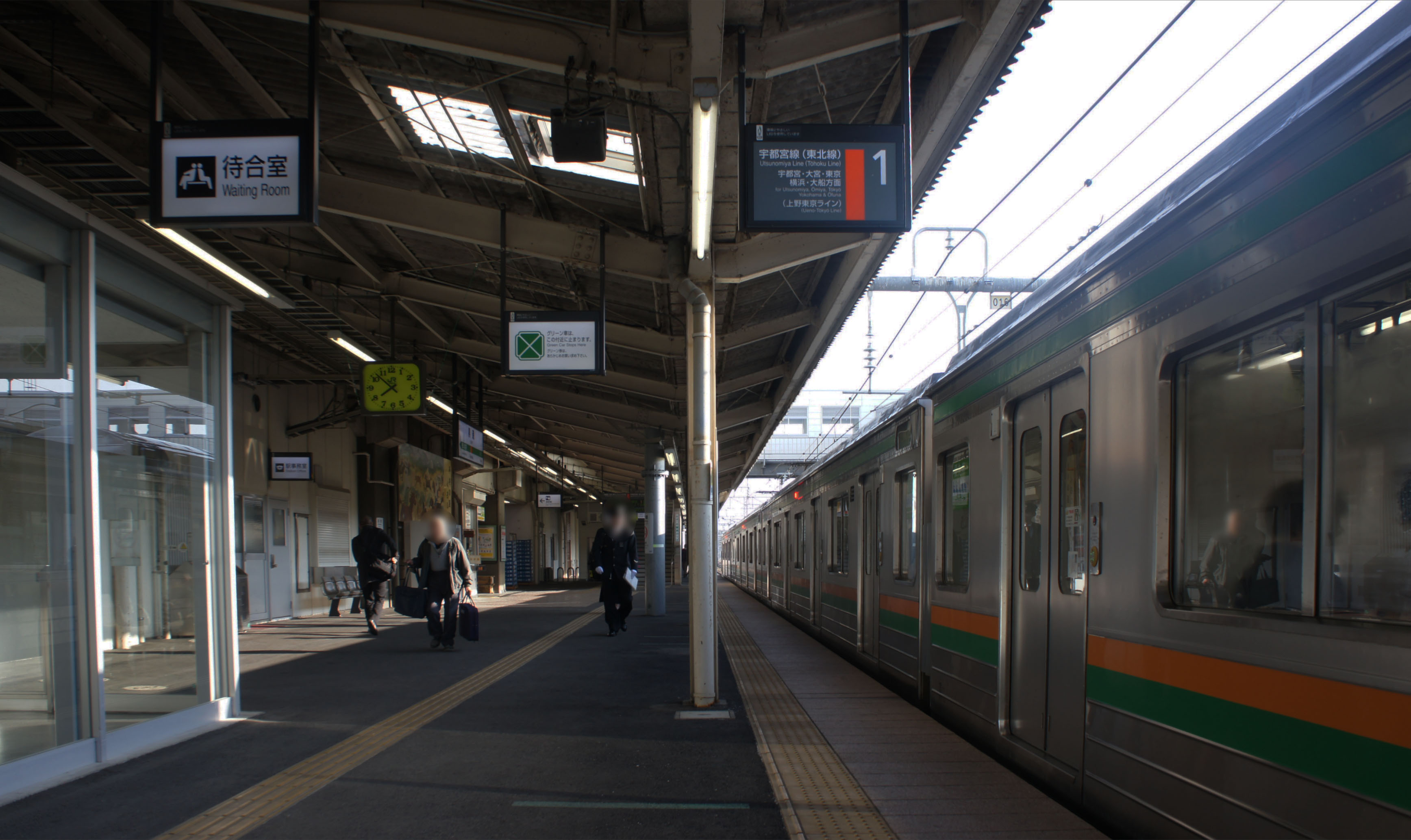
- Platform 1 of JR Tohoku-Main-Line Kuroiso Station

General information
- Location: 1 Honchō, Nasushiobara-shi, Tochigi-ken 325-0056; Japan
- Coordinates: 36°58′11.98″N 140°3′34.24″E
- Operator: JR East
- Line: Tōhoku Main Line
- Distance: 163.3 km from Tokyo
- Platforms: 2 island +1 side platforms
- Connections: Bus stop

Other information
- Status: Staffed (Midori no Madoguchi)
- Website: Official website

History
- Opened: December 1, 1886

Passengers
- FY2019: 2316 daily

Services
Preceding station	JR East	Following station
Terminus	Tōhoku Main Line Local	Takaku towards Morioka
Nasushiobara towards Tokyo	Utsunomiya Line Local	Terminus
Location
- Location within Tochigi Prefecture Location within Japan

Kuroiso Station (黒磯駅, Kuroiso-eki) is a railway station in the city of Nasushiobara, Tochigi, Japan, operated by the East Japan Railway Company (JR East).

== Lines ==
Kuroiso Station serves as the terminal station for two subsections of the JR East Tōhoku Main Line, connecting the Utsunomiya Line (for Utsunomiya, Ōmiya, and Ueno to the south) and the Southern Tōhoku Main Line (for Fukushima, Sendai, and Morioka to the north). It is 163.3 km from the line's starting point of Tokyo.

== Station layout ==
The station has one side platform and two island platforms serving five tracks. The platforms are connected to the station building by a footbridge. The station has a Midori no Madoguchi staffed ticket office.

=== Platforms ===
1-3	■ Utsunomiya Line	for Utsunomiya, Oyama
4-5	■ Tohoku Main Line	for Shin-Shirakawa

== History ==
Kuroiso Station opened on December 1, 1886, operated by Nippon Railway. The station came under the control of JGR after Nippon Railway was nationalized on November 1, 1906. JGR was reorganized into JNR on June 1, 1949, and inherited the station. The portion of the Utsunomiya Line from Hōshakuji to Kuroiso was electrified at 1.5 kV DC on May 22, 1959, and the section from Kuroiso to Shiroishi was electrified at 20 kV 50 Hz AC on July 1, 1959. With the privatization of JNR on April 1, 1987, the station came under the control of JR East.

The dead section between the AC and DC powered sections of the Tohoku Main Line was once located within the station. Trains hauled by electric locomotives switched to AC or DC-powered locomotives when continuing northbound or southbound respectively, and electric multiple units dropped their pantographs when changing sections. In 2008, a maintenance worker was killed by electric shock. In 2013, JR East changed the overhead lines in the station to be entirely DC-powered. The power system was then renovated, and on 1 January 2018, the dead section was relocated near a bridge north of the station.

== Passenger statistics ==
In fiscal 2019, the station was used by an average of 2316 passengers daily (boarding passengers only).

== Surrounding area ==
The station, located in the former city of Kuroiso, sits in front of a street lined with several local cafes and businesses. Having a bus terminal, it also serves as a gateway to the neighboring town of Nasu, known in Japan for its mountain hot springs and as the location of the Nasu Imperial Villa.

== See also ==
- List of railway stations in Japan
