= Kinomiya Station =

Railway station in Atami, Shizuoka Prefecture, Japan

JT22 Kinomiya Station 来宮駅
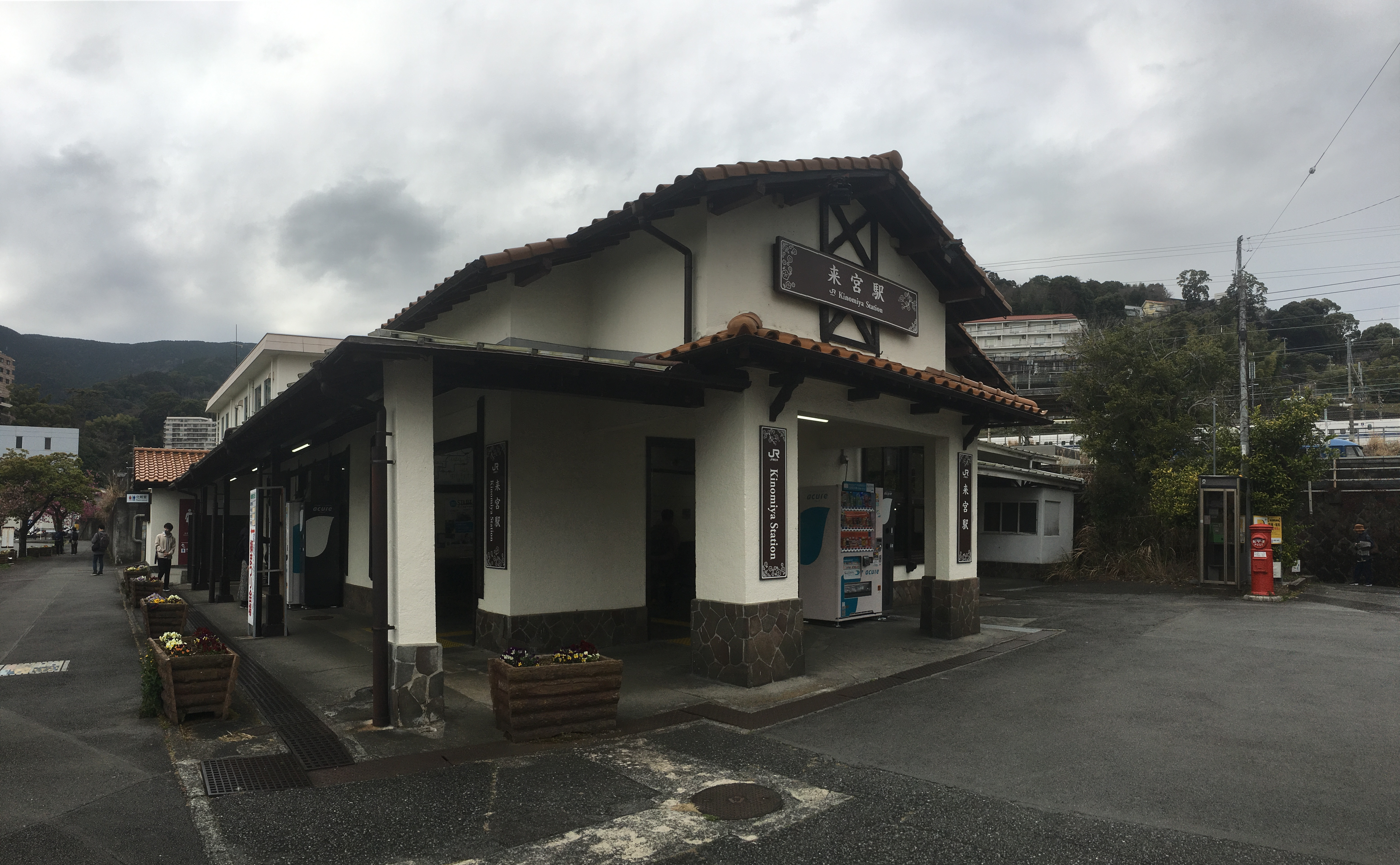
- Kinomiya Station building in March 2021

General information
- Location: 7-18 Fukumichi-chō, Atami City, Shizuoka Prefecture; Japan
- Coordinates: 35°5′55.12″N 139°3′57.16″E
- Operator: JR East
- Line: Itō Line
- Distance: 1.2 km (0.75 mi) from Atami
- Platforms: 1 island platform
- Tracks: 2

Construction
- Structure type: At grade

Other information
- Status: Unstaffed
- Station code: JT22
- Website: Official website

History
- Opened: 30 March 1935; 91 years ago

Passengers
- FY2013: 1,133 daily

Services
| Preceding station | JR East | Following station |
|---|---|---|
| Izu-Taga JT23 towards Itō | Itō Line | Atami JT21 Terminus |
Location
- Location within Shizuoka Prefecture Location within Central Japan Location within Japan

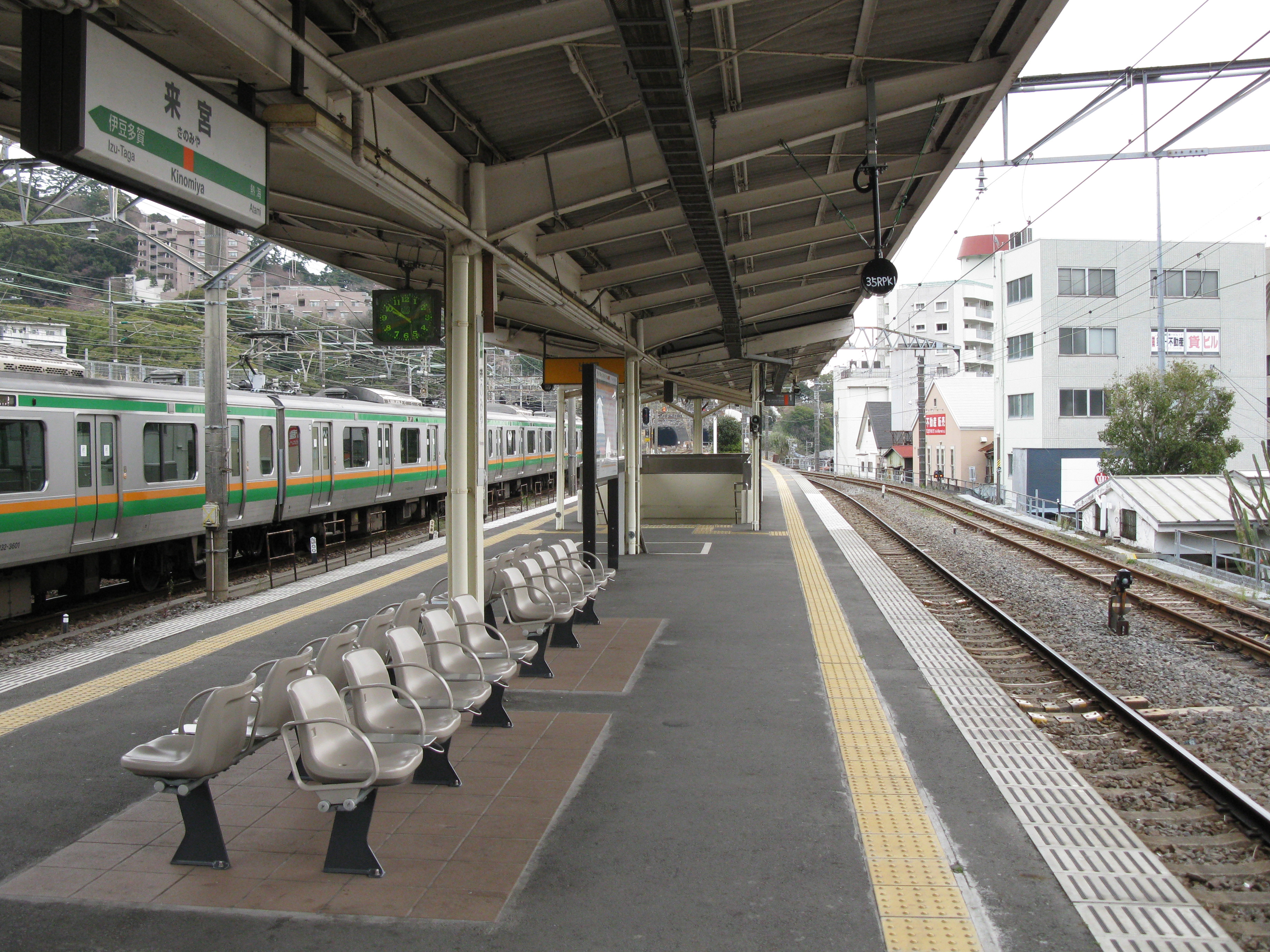
Platform

Kinomiya Station (来宮駅, Kinomiya-eki) is a railway station on the Itō Line of the East Japan Railway Company, located in the central part of the city of Atami, Shizuoka Prefecture, Japan. The Tōkaidō Main Line runs parallel to the Itō Line through Kinomiya Station, but only Itō Line has a station at this location. The 0-km indicator of the Itō Line is located at this station, although the Itō Line “officially” starts at Atami.

== Lines ==
Kinomiya Station is served by the Itō Line and is located 1.2 kilometers from the northern terminus of the line at Atami Station and 105.8 kilometers from Tokyo Station.

== Layout ==
Kinomiya Station has one island platform connected to the station building by an underground passage. The station is unattended.

=== Platforms ===
| 1 | Itō Line | for Itō, Izu-Kōgen, Izukyū Shimoda |
| 2 | Itō Line (Tōkaidō Line・Ueno-Tokyo Line) | for Atami, Yokohama, Tokyo, Utsunomiya (via Utsunomiya Line), Kagohara (via Takasaki Line) |

== History ==
The area around the Kinomiya Station is landfill, from the previous rubble formed by the digging of the Tanna Tunnel. Kinomiya Station opened on March 30, 1935, when the section of the Itō Line linking Atami with Ajiro was completed.

On April 1, 1987, along with division and privatization of the Japan National Railway, East Japan Railway Company started operating this station. The CTC center of the Itō Line used to be located at Kinomiya, but along with its renewal to one that includes the controller of tracks at Atami Station in autumn of 2006, it moved to Atami.

== Passenger statistics ==
In fiscal 2013, the station was used by an average of 1133 passengers daily (boarding passengers only).

== Surrounding area ==
- Atami Police Office
- Atami Post Office

== See also ==
- List of railway stations in Japan
