= Itō Line =

Railway line in Shizuoka prefecture, Japan

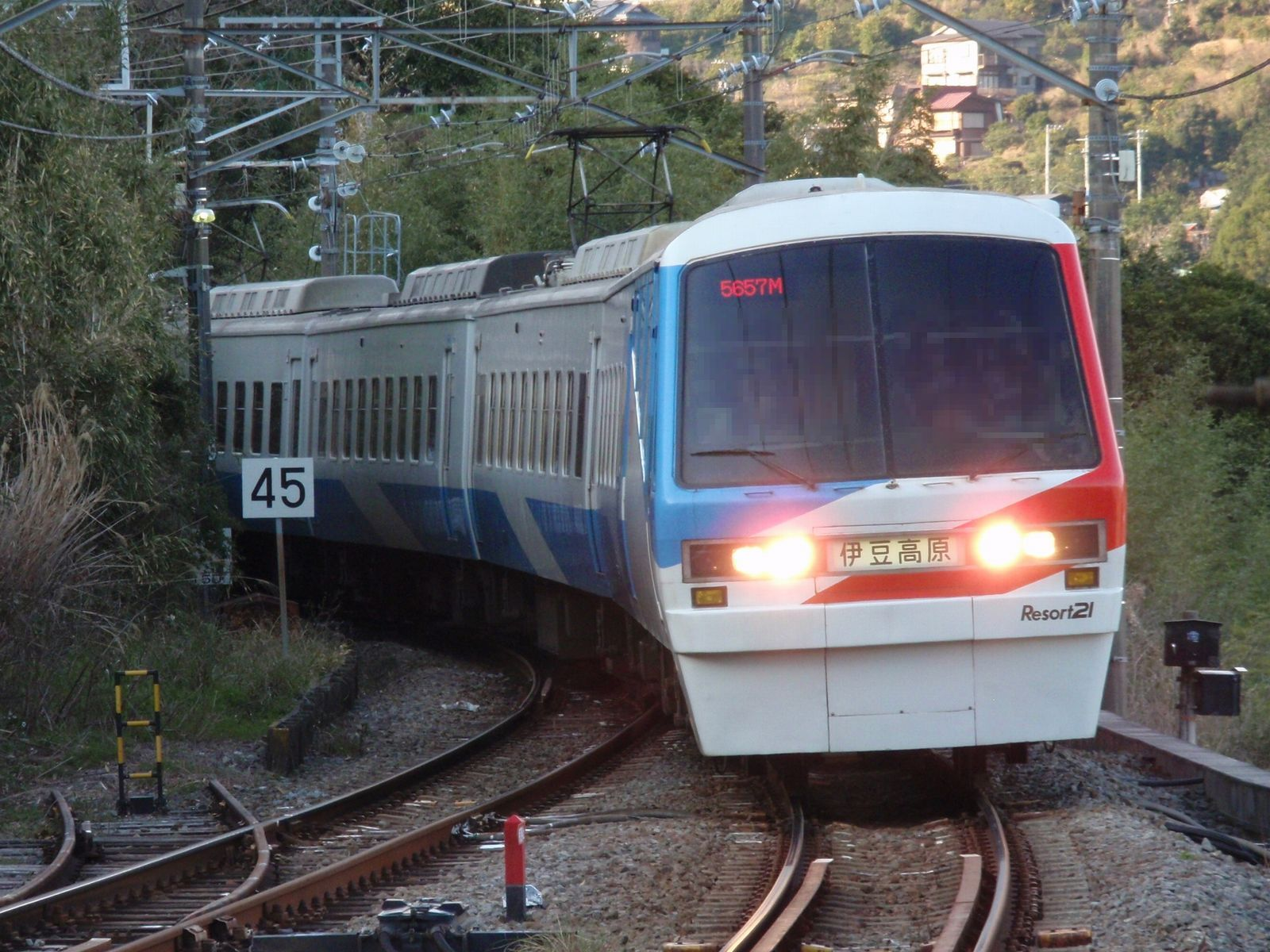
- Izu Kyuko Railway 2100 series "Resort21" train at Izu-Taga Station, March 2010

Overview
- Locale: Shizuoka Prefecture
- Termini: Atami; Itō
- Stations: 6

Service
- Type: Heavy rail
- Operator: JR East

History
- Opened: 30 March 1935; 91 years ago
- Last extension: 15 December 1938; 87 years ago

Technical
- Line length: 16.9 km (10.5 mi)
- Track gauge: 1,067 mm (3 ft 6 in)
- Minimum radius: 240 m (790 ft)
- Electrification: 1,500 V DC (Overhead line)
- Operating speed: 95 km/h (59 mph)
- Train protection system: ATS-P
- Maximum incline: 2.5%
Route map

The Itō Line (Japanese: 伊東線, Hepburn: Itō-sen) is a railway line owned by the East Japan Railway Company (JR East) which connects Atami and Itō Stations, along the east coast of Izu Peninsula in Shizuoka Prefecture, Japan. From Itō, the line continues south to Shimoda under the privately owned and operated Izu Kyūkō Line.

== Station list ==
Station No.	Name	Japanese	Distance from Atami (km)	Transfers	Location	
(Through service for Tokyo, Kagohara, Utsunomiya via Tōkaidō Line, Ueno-Tokyo Line, Utsunomiya Line and Takasaki Line)
JT21	Atami	熱海	0	Tokaido Shinkansen; Tōkaidō Main Line; Tōkaidō Line (through service)	Atami	Shizuoka
JT22	Kinomiya	来宮	1.2		Atami	Shizuoka
JT23	Izu-Taga	伊豆多賀	6.0		Atami	Shizuoka
JT24	Ajiro	網代	8.7		Atami	Shizuoka
JT25	Usami	宇佐美	13.0		Itō	Shizuoka
JT26	Itō	伊東	16.9	Izu Kyūkō Line (through service)	Itō	Shizuoka
	(Through service for Izukyū Shimoda via Izu Kyūkō Line)					

== Rolling stock ==
- Local trains
  - E231 series 10-car EMUs (Ito・Tokaido・Ueno-Tokyo Lines)
  - E233 series 10-car EMUs (Ito・Tokaido・Ueno-Tokyo Lines)
  - Izukyu 2100 series 7-car EMUs (Ito・Izukyu Lines)
  - Izukyu 8000 series 3-car or 6-car coupled EMUs (Ito・Izukyu Lines)
- Limited express
  - 185 series 7-car or 10-car EMUs (Odoriko)
  - E257-2000 series (Odoriko)
  - E261 series Saphir Odoriko
  - Izukyu 2100 series 7-car or 8-car EMUs (Resort Odoriko)
- Sightseeing trains
  - 651-1000 series 4-car EMUs (Izu Craile)
    - A rebuilt four-car 651 series resort train set named Izu Craile(Japanese: 伊豆クレイル) entered service on the Ito Line in the summer of 2016. The name is a portmanteau formed from "Cresciuto" (Italian for "mature"), "train", and the suffix "-ile". Car 1 had window-facing counter seats on the seaward side, car 2 had a bar counter and lounge, car 3 had semi-open compartments, and car 4 had conventional unidirectional 2+2-abreast seating. The service ran until June 28, 2020, as JR East decided that with the introduction of Saphir Odoriko services, the Izu Craile service would be surplus to requirements.

== Train service ==
Most of the local trains are only run between Atami Station and Izukyū Shimoda station via Izu Kyūkō Line.

A few local trains with Green Cars departing from Itō Station enter the Tokaido Main Line, with most of them entering the Ueno-Tokyo Line, and the farthest terminals are Utsunomiya Station or Kagohara Station. As such, Itō Station is the most southern terminal of the Ueno-Tokyo Line.

== History ==
Initial plans called for the Japanese National Railways (JNR) to build a spur line linking Atami on the Tokaido Main Line with Shimoda. However, funding was limited in the 1930s due to a combination of a tight fiscal policy under Prime Minister Osachi Hamaguchi during the Great Depression, and a number of technical issues. The projected route of the Itō line along the mountainous east coast of the Izu Peninsula required numerous tunnels and bridges. Workers digging a tunnel near Usami encountered problems with underground hot springs, similar to that experienced in the construction of the Tanna Tunnel, which had recently been completed years later than originally projected and far over budget.

On March 30, 1935, the initial 8.7 km section of the Itō Line linking Atami with Ajiro was opened. The second (8.3 km) section from Ajiro to Itō was opened on December 15, 1938. Both sections were electrified at 1,500 V DC when opened. Further work was delayed, and then canceled due to the outbreak of World War II.

CTC signalling was commissioned in 1958, and the Atami to Kinomiya section was duplicated in 1968. The entire line was originally designed to be built as double track, and earthworks were undertaken on this basis, including tunneling, but to date only the first 1.2 km of the line has been duplicated.

Construction south of Itō resumed in 1961, when the private-sector Tokyu Corporation acquired the rights to complete the line to Shimoda and established the Izukyu Corporation to manage construction and operations of this section.
