= Usami Station =

Railway station in Itō, Shizuoka Prefecture, Japan

JT25 Usami Station 宇佐美駅
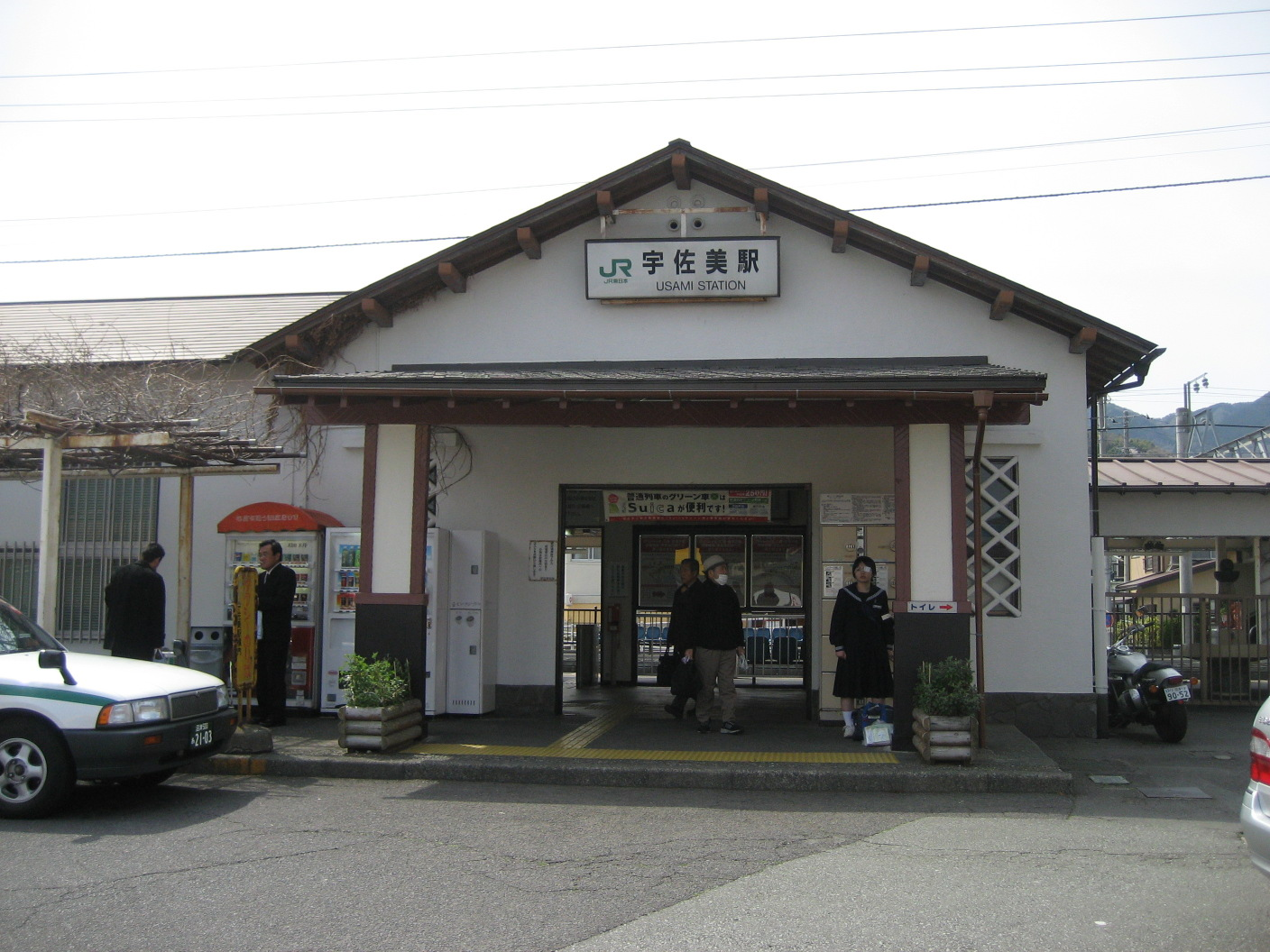
- Usami Station in March 2008

General information
- Location: Usami, Itō-shi, Shizuoka-ken; Japan
- Coordinates: 35.005931°N 139.079864°E
- Operator: JR East
- Line: Itō Line
- Distance: 13.0 kilometers from Atami
- Platforms: 2 side platforms

Other information
- Status: Unstaffed
- Website: Official website

History
- Opened: December 15, 1938

Passengers
- FY2013: 1254 daily

Services
| Preceding station | JR East | Following station |
|---|---|---|
| Itō JT26 Terminus | Itō Line | Ajiro JT24 towards Atami |
Location
- Location within Shizuoka Prefecture Location within Japan

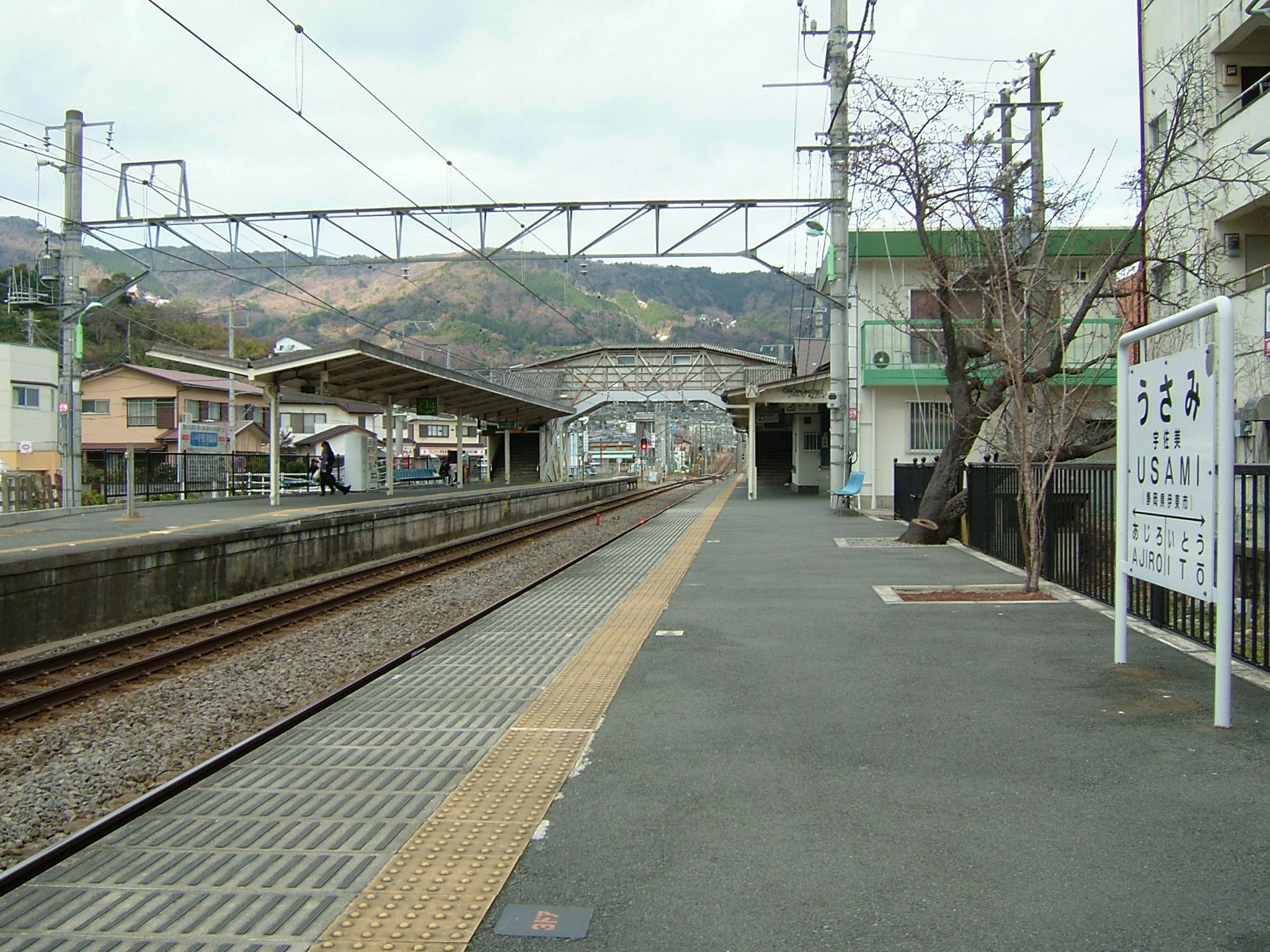
Platforms

Usami Station (宇佐美駅, Usami-eki) is a railway station in the northern part of the city of Itō, Shizuoka Prefecture, Japan, operated by East Japan Railway Company (JR East).

== Lines ==
Usami Station is served by the Itō Line, and is located 13.0 kilometers from the starting point of the line at Atami Station and 117.6 kilometers from Tokyo Station.

== Station layout ==
Usami Station has two opposed ground level side platforms connected by a footbridge. The station building has automated ticket machines and Suica automated turnstiles, and is unattended.

=== Platforms ===
| 1 | Itō Line | for Itō, Izu-Kōgen, Izukyū Shimoda |
| 2 | Itō Line (Tōkaidō Line・Ueno-Tokyo Line) | for Atami, Yokohama, Tokyo, Utsunomiya (via Utsunomiya Line), Kagohara (via Takasaki Line) |

== History ==
Usami Station opened on December 15, 1938, when the section of the Itō Line linking Ajiro with Itō was completed. Freight services were discontinued on November 1, 1958. On April 1, 1987, along with division and privatization of the Japan National Railway, East Japan Railway Company started operating this station.

== Passenger statistics ==
In fiscal 2013, the station was used by an average of 1254 passengers daily (boarding passengers only).

== Surrounding area ==
- Usami Onsen

== See also ==
- List of railway stations in Japan
