= Izu-Taga Station =

Railway station in Atami, Shizuoka Prefecture, Japan

JT23 Izu-Taga Station 伊豆多賀駅
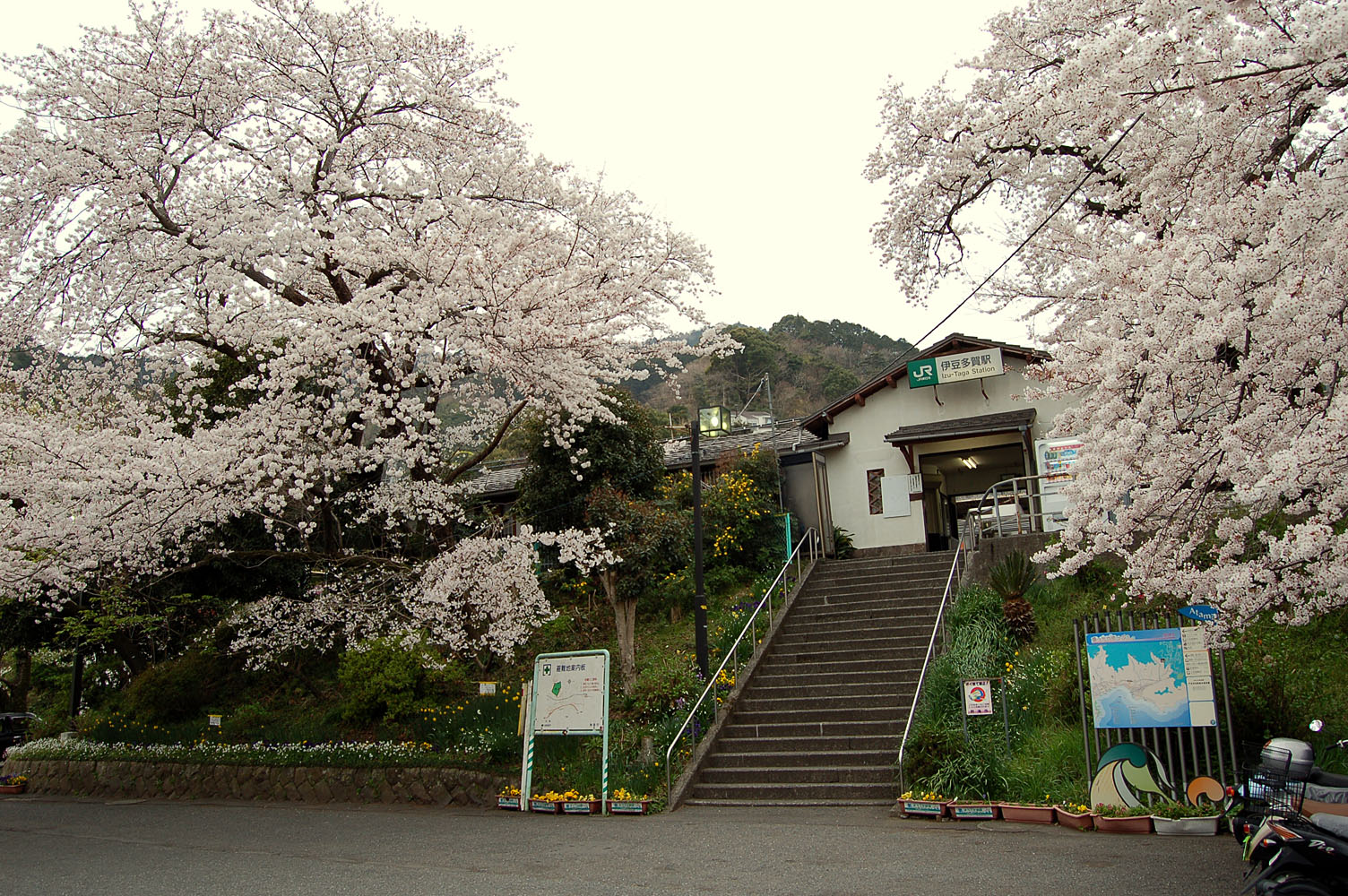
- Izu-Taga Station in 2008

General information
- Location: 1627 Kami-Taga, Atami-shi, Shizuoka-ken; Japan
- Coordinates: 35°3′32″N 139°4′1″E
- Operator: JR East
- Line: ■ Itō Line
- Distance: 6.0 kilometers from Atami
- Platforms: 2 side platforms

Other information
- Status: Unstaffed
- Website: Official website

History
- Opened: March 30, 1935

Passengers
- FY2013: 615 daily

Services
Preceding station	JR East	Following station
Ajiro JT24 towards Itō	Itō Line	Kinomiya JT22 towards Atami
Location
- Location within Shizuoka Prefecture Location within Japan

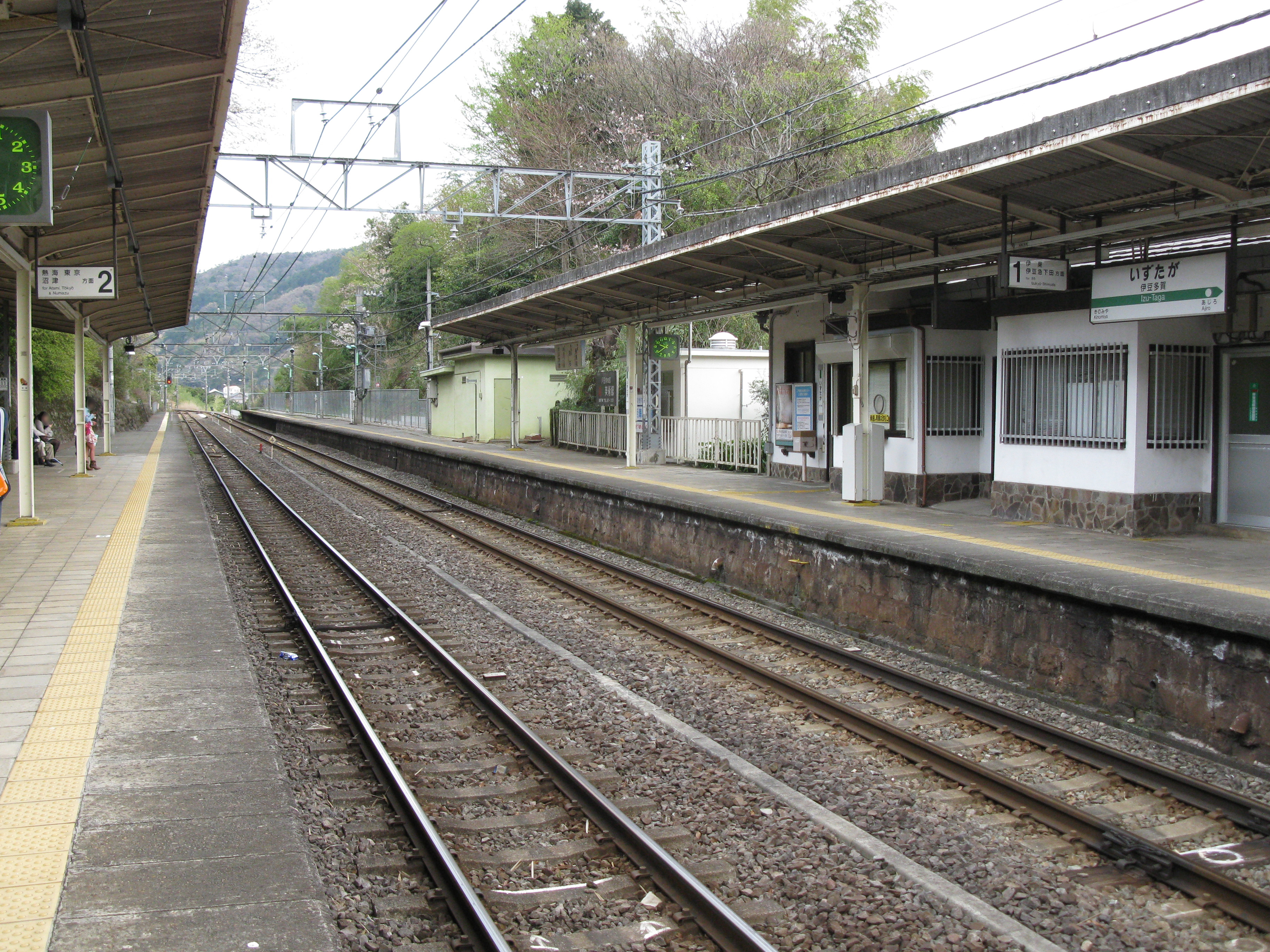
Platforms

Izu-Taga Station (伊豆多賀駅, Izu-Taga-eki) is a railway station on the Itō Line of the East Japan Railway Company, located in the southern part of the city of Atami, Shizuoka Prefecture, Japan.

== Lines ==
Izu-Taga Station is served by the Itō Line and is located 6.0 kilometers from the northern terminus of the line at Atami Station and 110.6 kilometers from Tokyo Station.

== Layout ==
Izu-Taga Station has two opposing side platforms, one of which is connected directly to the station building and the other connected via an underpass. The station is unattended.

=== Platforms ===
1	Itō Line	for Itō, Izu-Kōgen, Izukyū Shimoda
2	Itō Line (Tōkaidō Line・Ueno-Tokyo Line)	for Atami, Yokohama, Tokyo, Utsunomiya (via Utsunomiya Line), Kagohara (via Takasaki Line)

== History ==
Izu-Taga Station opened on March 30, 1935, when the section of the Itō Line linking Atami with Ajiro was completed. Freight services were discontinued on November 1, 1958. On April 1, 1987, along with division and privatization of the Japan National Railway, East Japan Railway Company started operating this station.

== Passenger statistics ==
In fiscal 2013, the station was used by an average of 615 passengers daily (boarding passengers only).

== Surrounding area ==
- Atami High School
- Izu-Taga onsen

== See also ==
- List of railway stations in Japan
