= E261 series =

Japanese train type

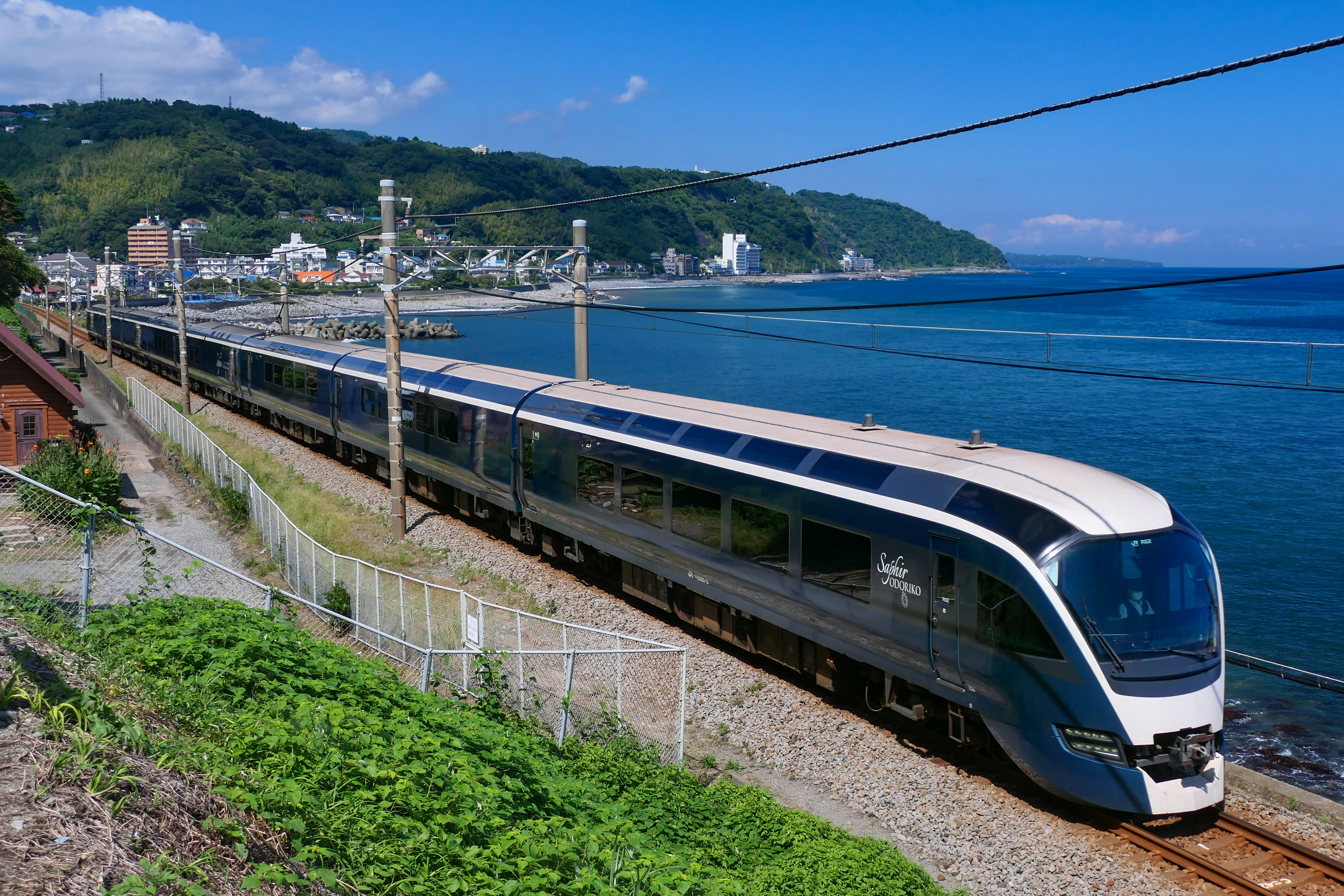
- E261 series running on the Izu Kyūkō Line, September 2021
- Manufacturers: Kawasaki Heavy Industries, Hitachi
- Designer: Ken Okuyama Design
- Built at: Hyogo (Kawasaki); Kudamatsu (Hitachi)
- Family name: Saphir Odoriko
- Replaced: 251 series
- Constructed: 2019
- Entered service: March 14, 2020
- Number built: 16 vehicles (2 sets)
- Formation: 8 cars per trainset
- Fleet numbers: RS1 – RS2
- Capacity: 164 seated
- Operator: JR East

Specifications
- Car body construction: Aluminum
- Car length: 21.4 m (70 ft 3 in) (end cars); 20.5 m (67 ft 3 in) (intermediate cars)
- Maximum speed: 120 km/h (75 mph)
- Traction system: SiC-MOSFET–VVVF (Hitachi)
- Traction motors: 4 × Hitachi 140 kW (190 hp) MT79 3-phase AC induction motor
- Electric systems: 1,500 V DC overhead lines
- Current collection: Pantograph
- Track gauge: 1,067 mm (3 ft 6 in)

The E261 series (Japanese: E261系, Hepburn: E261-kei) is an electric multiple unit (EMU) train type operated by East Japan Railway Company (JR East) in Japan on Saphir Odoriko limited express services between Tokyo and Izukyū-Shimoda. It was designed to replace the older 251 series trains that were used on Super View Odoriko limited express services from April 28, 1990, until March 13, 2020.

== History ==
The trains are designed by Ken Okuyama Design, with exterior painted with sapphire blue to match with the blue sky of the Izu Peninsula. Two eight car sets were manufactured, by Kawasaki Heavy Industries' Hyogo factory (cars 1 to 3) and Hitachi's Kasado factory (cars 4 to 8).

Set RS1 operated a trial run on November 21, 2019, and the trains entered service on March 14, 2020, the day after the 251 series Super View Odoriko sets were retired.

== Technical specifications ==
The car bodies are made of aluminum, and the trains use three phase motors and VVVF inverters. Each car has one door per side; cars 3, 5, and 7 are fitted with pantographs, with the one on car 5 being for emergency use.

== Formation ==
The trains are formed as eight-car sets, with five motored and three trailer cars. Car 1 faces towards Izukyū-Shimoda and car 8 towards Tokyo.

	← Izukyū-Shimoda, Atami Tokyo, Shinjuku →							
Car No.	1	2	3	4	5	6	7	8
Designation	KuRo E260-0 (Tsc')	MoRo E260-100 (M2s1)	MoRo E261-100 (M1s1)	SaShi E261-0 (TD)	MoRo E261-0 (M1s)	MoRo E260-0 (M2s)	MoRo E261-200 (Ms)	KuRo E261-0 (Tsc)
Weight (t)	38.6	37.6	39.1	39.2	40.2	39.2	40.5	38.6
Capacity	20	20	20	(16)	14	36	30	24

- Cars 3 and 7 are each fitted with one single-arm pantograph, and car 5 is fitted with two.

== Interior ==
=== Premium Green Car (Car 1) ===
Car 1 is designated as a "premium green car" with a 1+1 private seating layout. The fully power-reclining seats, made of leather and equipped with leg rest and luggage space under each seat, can be swiveled towards the window side for the view of Izu's seaside.

=== Green car private compartments (Cars 2 and 3) ===
Cars 2 to 3 are designated as "green cars" with private compartment seating for groups of 4 to 6 people and are priced higher than the "premium green car". Seats are arranged in transverse seating for the 4 person compartments and individual seatings for the 6 person compartments. All private compartments have the electrical power outlets.

=== Cafeteria (Car 4) ===
Car 4 is designated as the cafeteria, with an open-style kitchen, counter seats, and table seats.

=== Green car (Cars 5 to 8) ===
Cars 5 to 8 are designated as regular "green cars"; passenger accommodation consists of 2+1 seating throughout. Each seat is equipped with power outlets and can be reclined. Two single seats on car 5 are equipped with belts for wheelchairs.

=== Features ===
All cars, except cars 2 to 4, have a luggage area at the end sections and overhead, and restrooms are available in cars 2, 3, and 7, with multi-accessible toilet located at car 5. All seats except private compartments are equipped with personal reading lights, and all cars feature Wi-Fi connection.

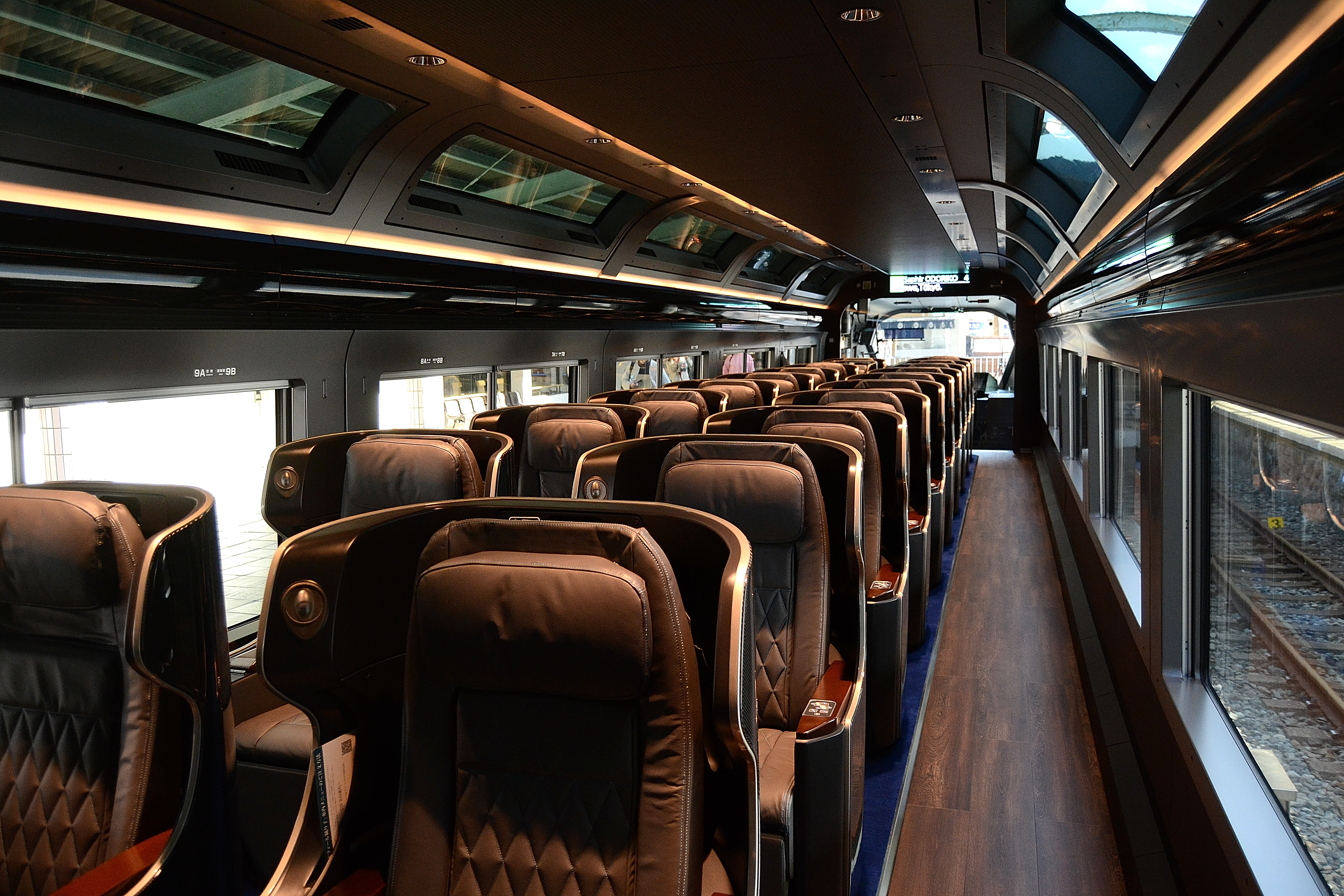
Premium green car

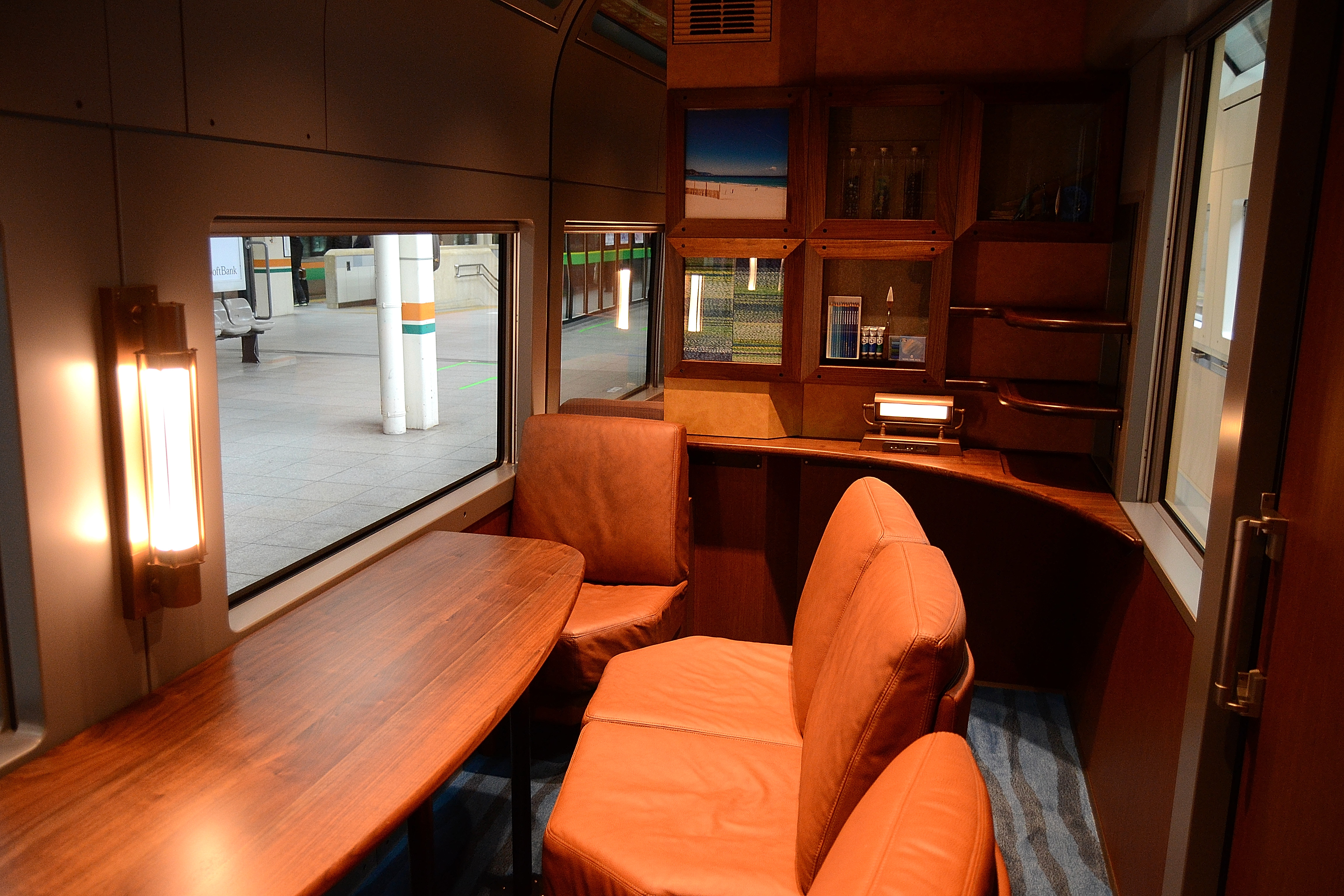
Green car compartments

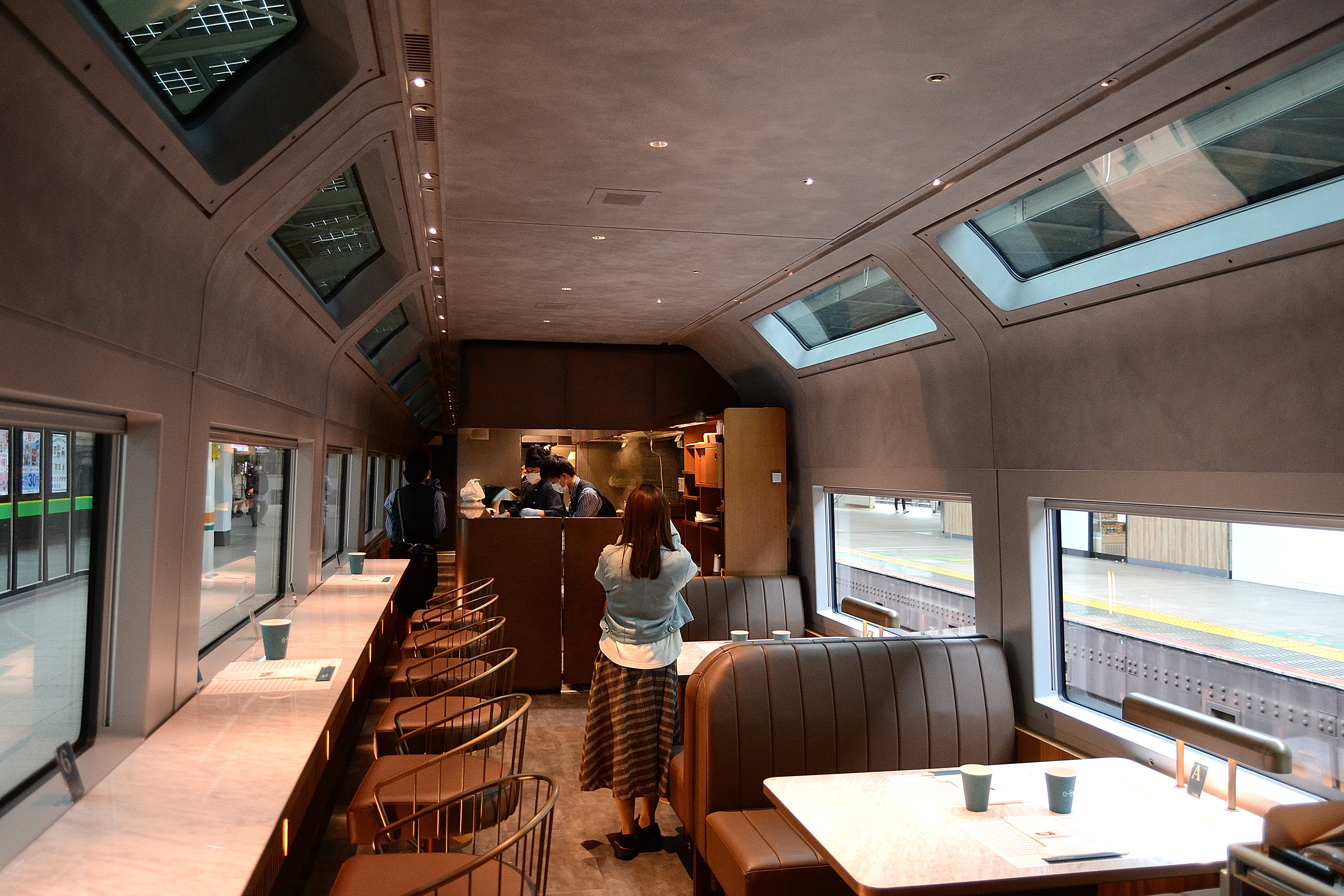
Cafeteria

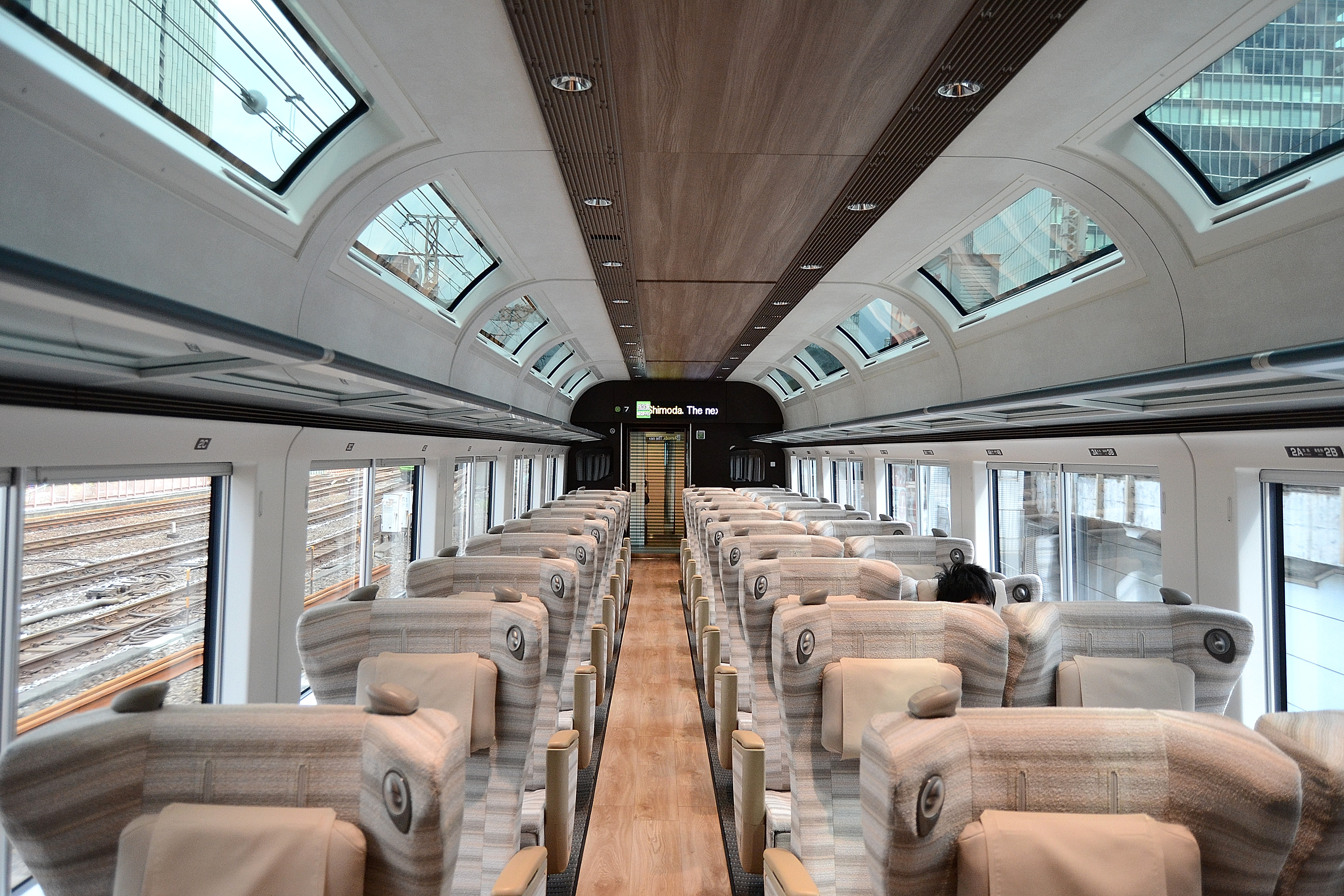
Green car

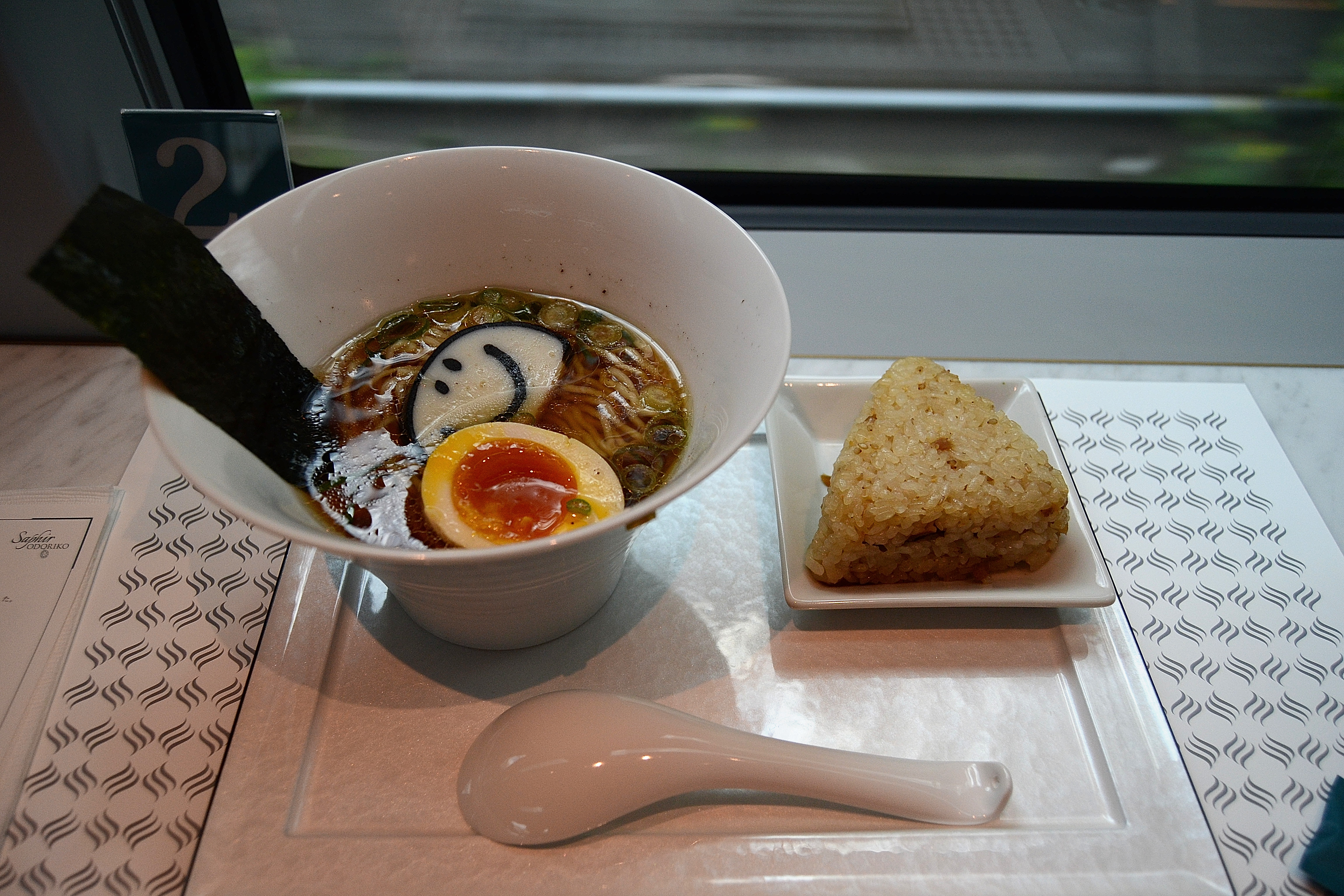
Ramen noodles and onigiri served in the cafeteria

== See also ==
- 251 series, the limited express EMU type used on Super View Odoriko services prior to the introduction of the E261 series
- Odoriko, the regular express service beside the limited express service
