= 251 series =

Japanese train type

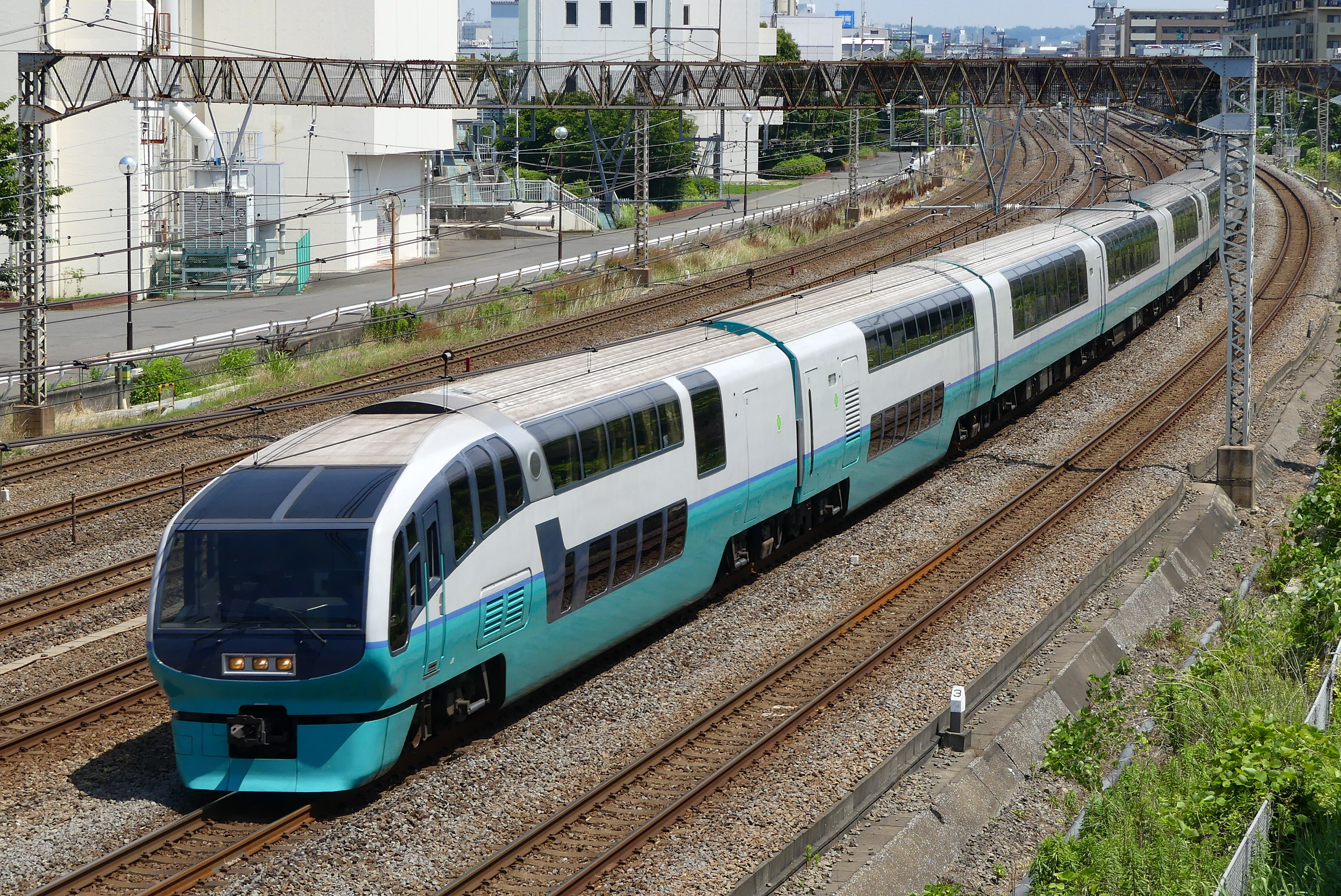
- A 251 series train on a Tōkaidō Main Line Super View Odoriko service in June 2017
- In service: April 1990–March 2020
- Manufacturers: Kawasaki Heavy Industries and Kinki Sharyo
- Entered service: 28 April 1990
- Refurbished: 2002–2004
- Scrapped: 2020
- Number built: 40 vehicles (4 sets)
- Number in service: None
- Number preserved: None
- Number scrapped: 40 vehicles (4 sets)
- Successor: E261 series
- Formation: 10 cars per trainset
- Fleet numbers: RE1–4
- Operator: JR East
- Depot: Ōmiya
- Line served: Tokaido Main Line

Specifications
- Car body construction: Steel
- Car length: 20,000 mm (65 ft 7 in)
- Width: 2,950 mm (9 ft 8 in)
- Height: 4,070 mm (13 ft 4 in)
- Doors: Plug doors: 1 per side
- Maximum speed: 120 km/h (75 mph)
- Traction system: Resistor control + field system superimposed field excitation control
- Electric systems: 1,500 V DC overhead catenary
- Current collection: PS27 scissors type pantograph
- Safety systems: ATS-SN, ATS-P
- Track gauge: 1,067 mm (3 ft 6 in)

The 251 series (Japanese: 251系) was a DC electric multiple unit (EMU) train type operated by East Japan Railway Company (JR East) on Tokaido Main Line Super View Odoriko limited express services in Japan between April 1990 and March 2020.

== Operations ==
The 251 series sets were primarily used on Super View Odoriko limited express services from Tokyo, Ikebukuro, and Shinjuku to Izukyu Shimoda.

Since the 13 March 2004 timetable revision, 251 series sets were also used on the weekday morning Ohayō Liner Shinjuku 26 and weekday evening Home Liner Odawara 23 services.

== Formation ==
The four sets, numbered RE1 to RE4 and based at Ōmiya Depot in Tokyo, were formed as follows, with car 1 at the Izukyū-Shimoda end, and car 10 at the Tokyo and Shinjuku end.

Car No.	1	2	3	4	5	6	7	8	9	10
Designation	Tscd'	Tsd	M'	M1	M'1	M	M'	M	T	Tcd
Numbering	KuRo 250	SaRo 251	MoHa 250	MoHa 251-100	MoHa 250-100	MoHa 251	MoHa 250	MoHa 251	SaHa 251	KuHa 251

Cars 4, 6, and 8 were each fitted with one PS27 scissors type pantograph.

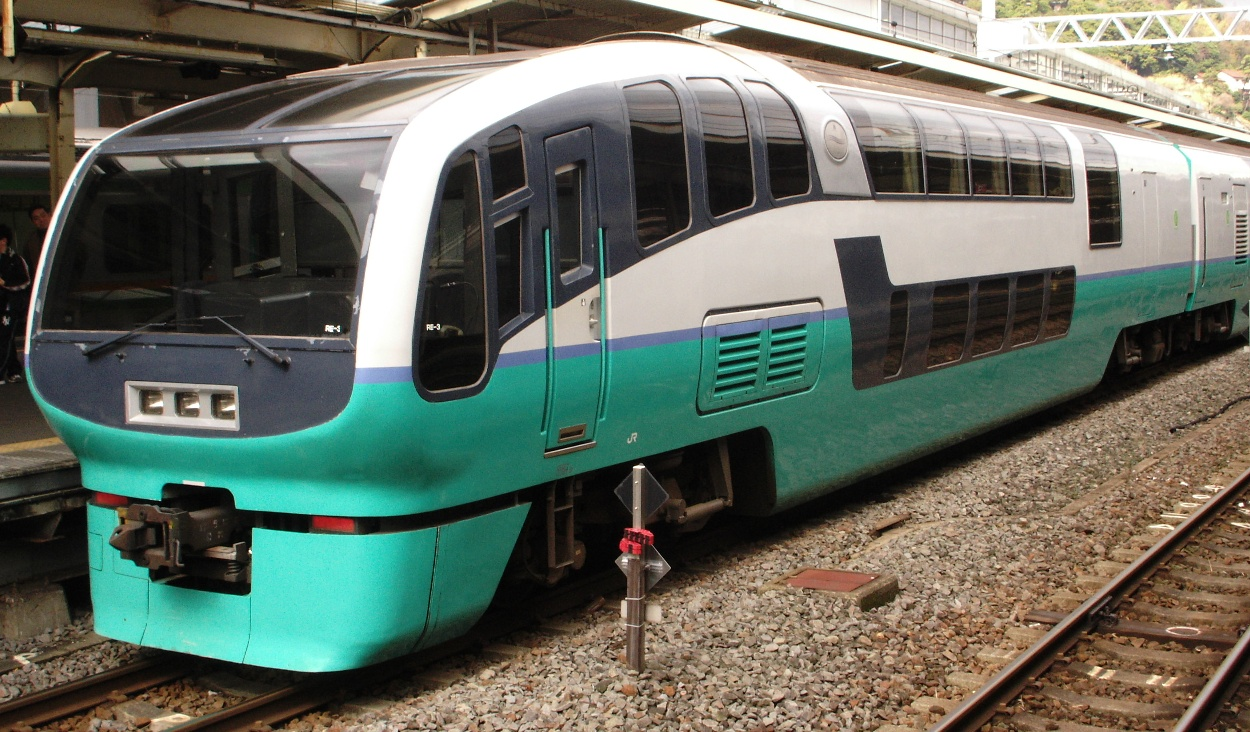
KuRo 250 (car 1)

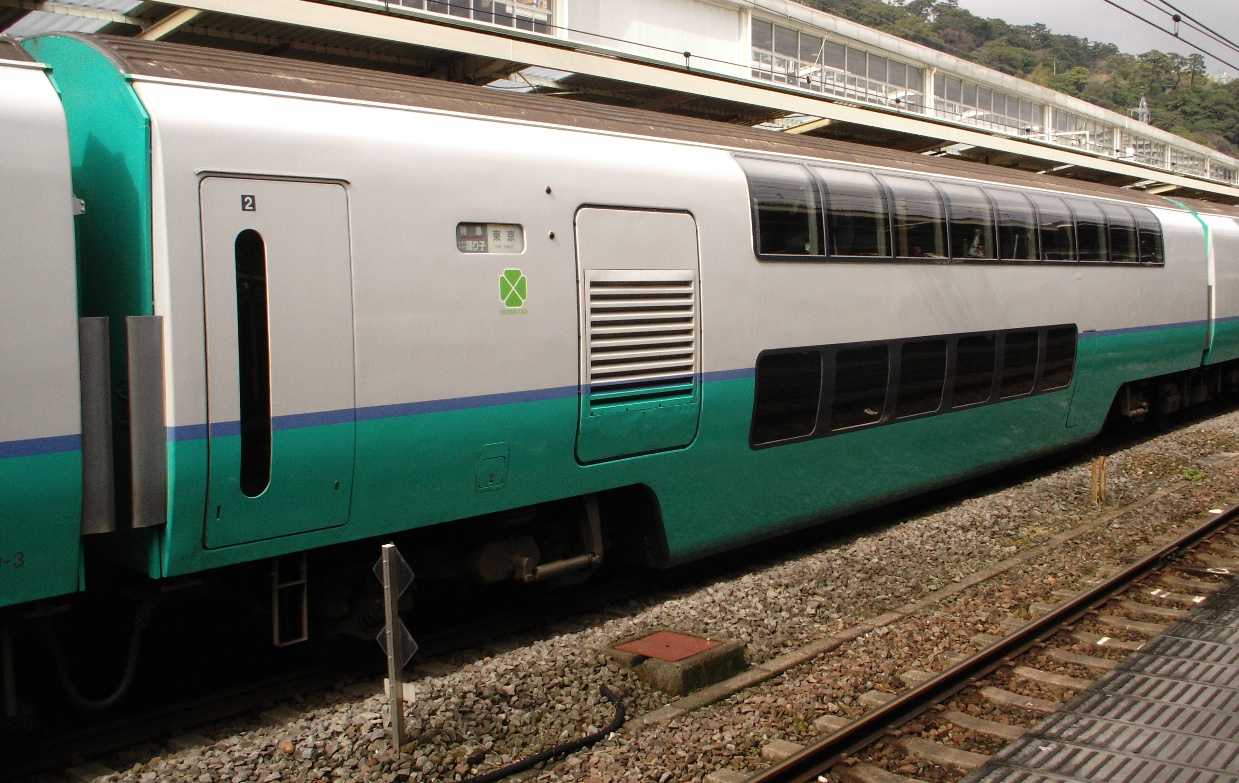
SaRo 251 (car 2)

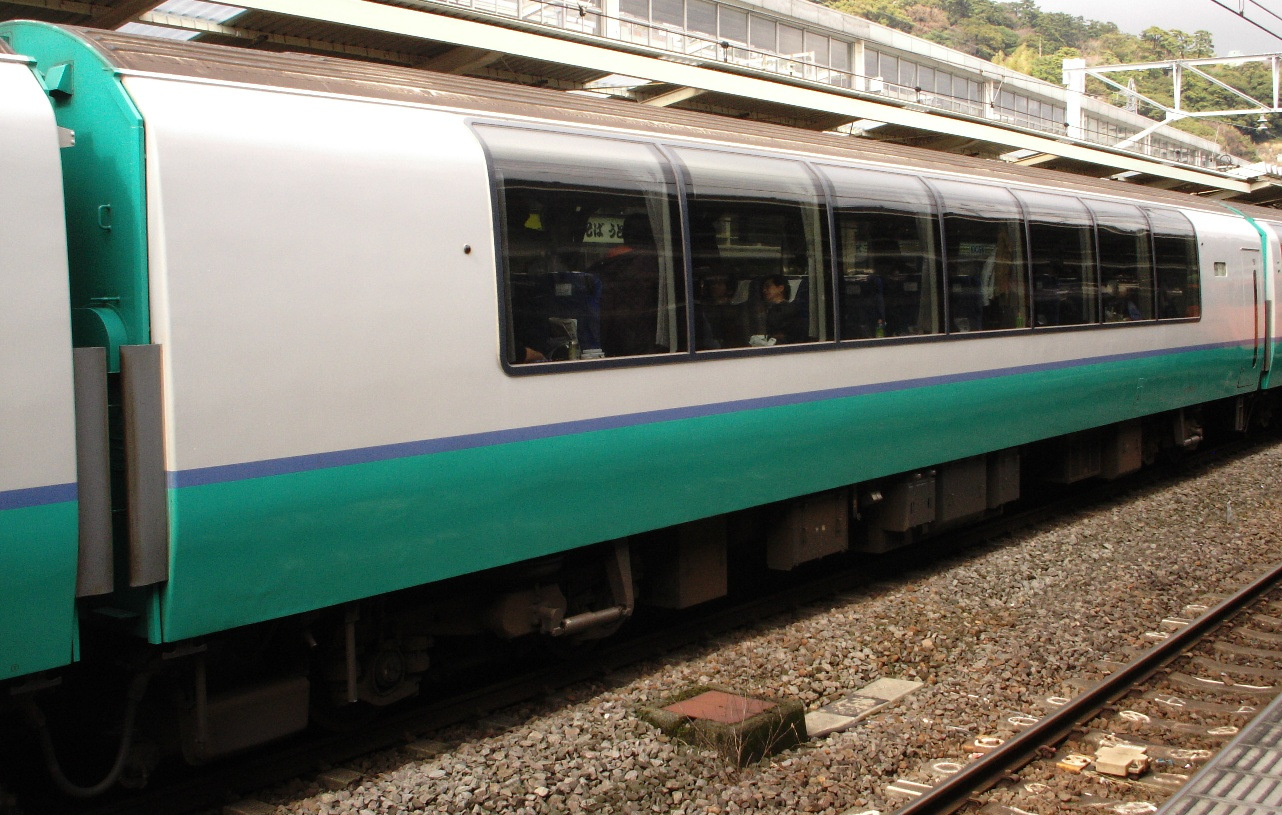
MoHa 250 (car 3)

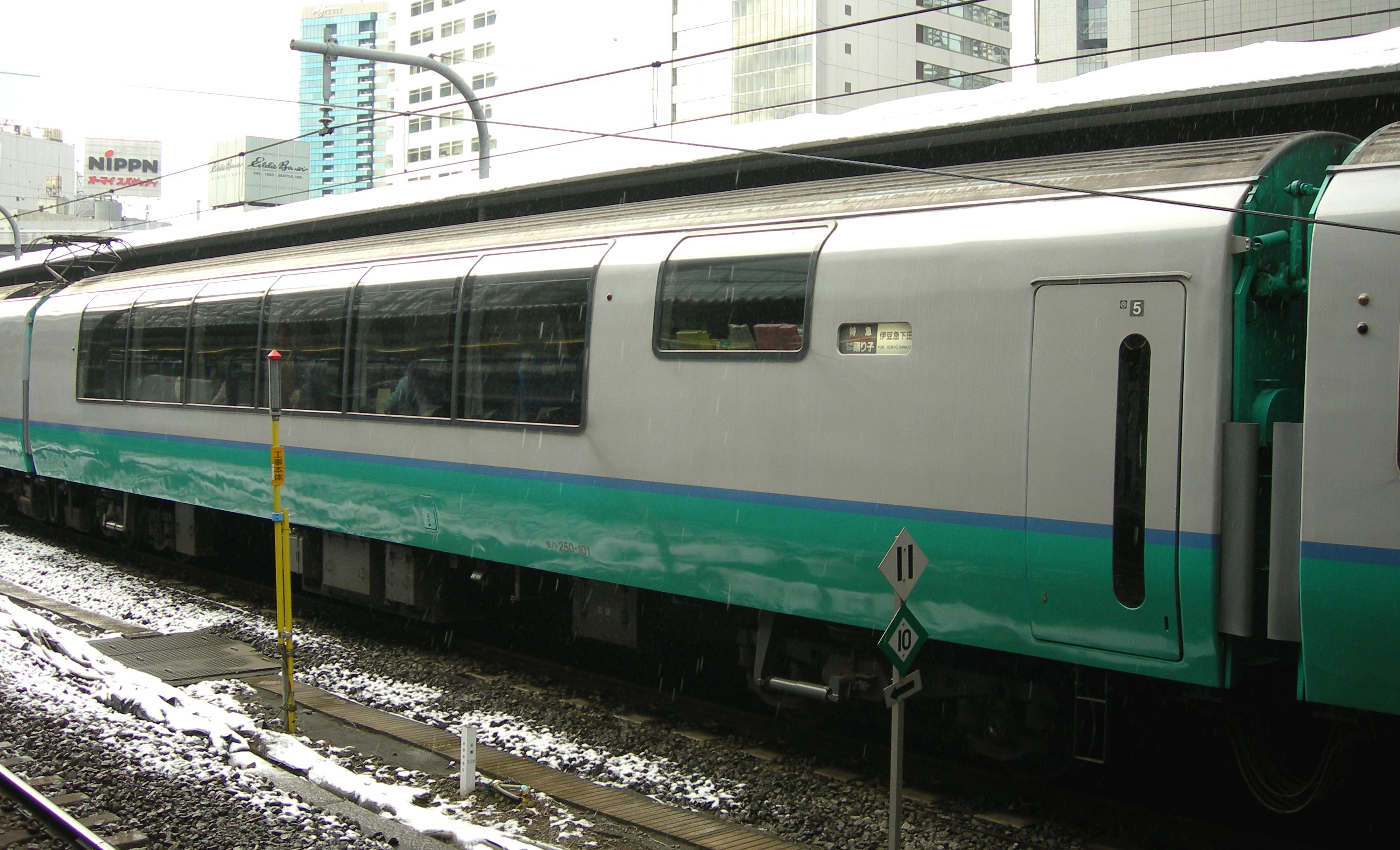
MoHa 250-100 (car 5)

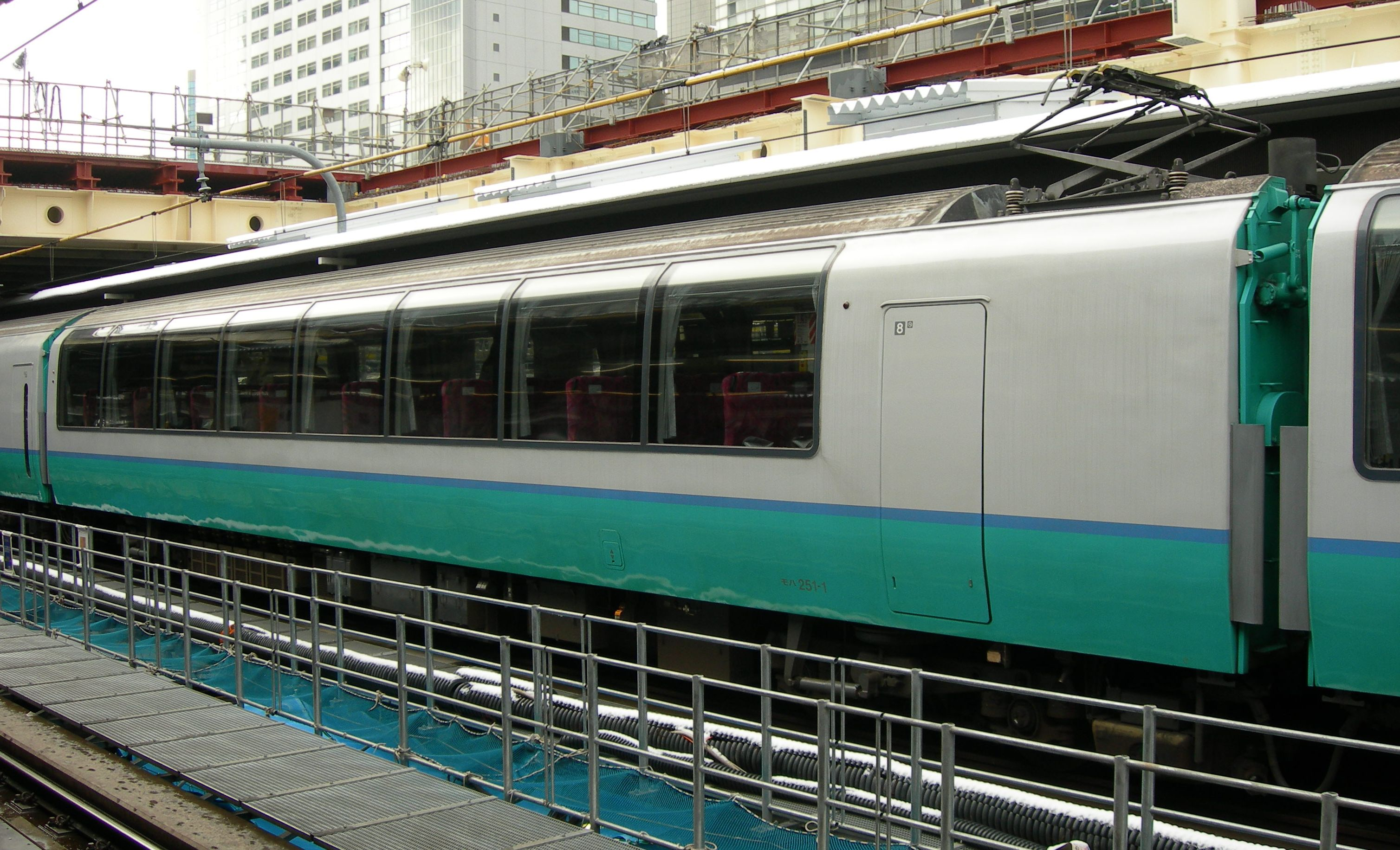
MoHa 251 (car 8)

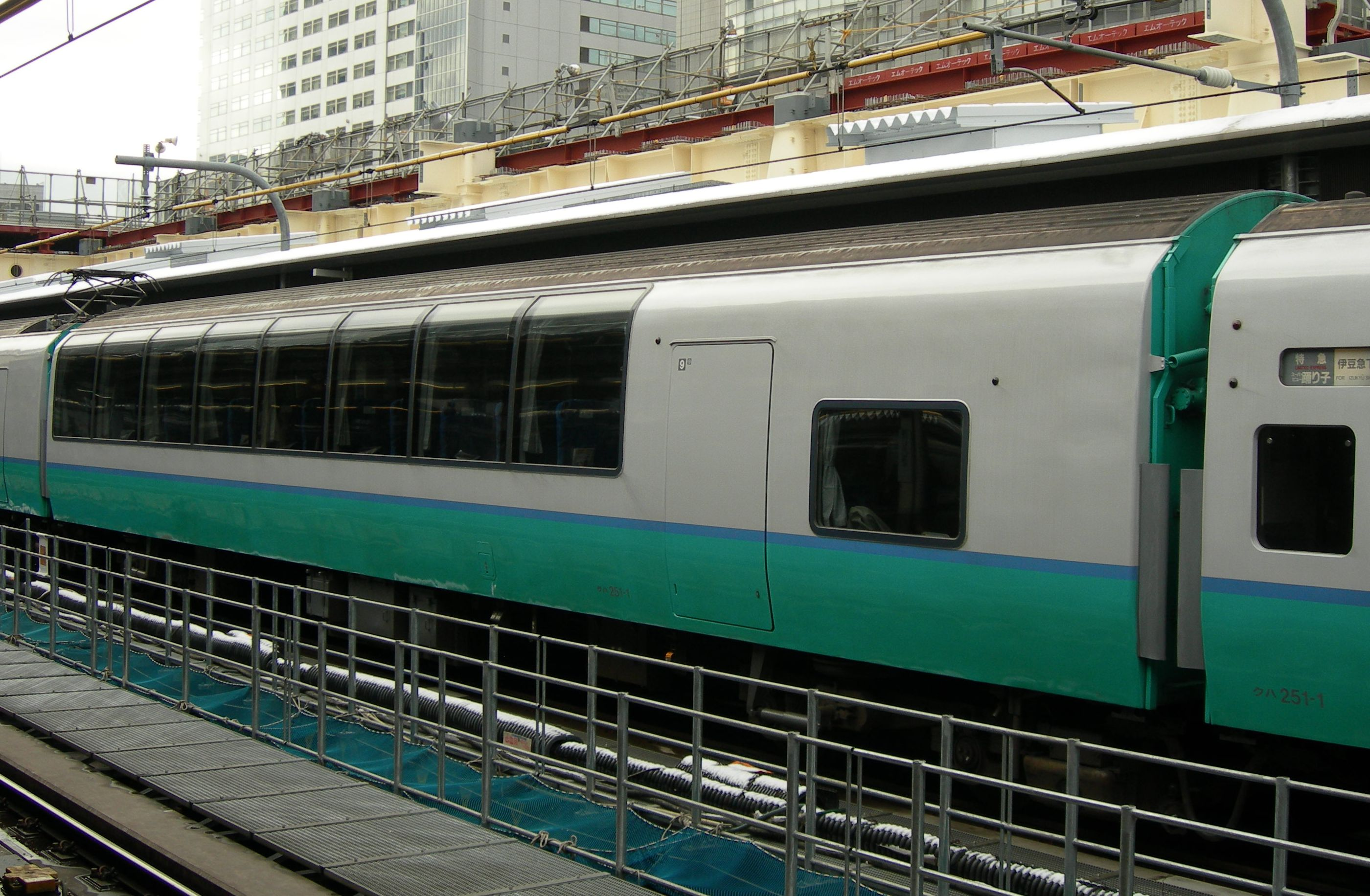
SaHa 251 (car 9)

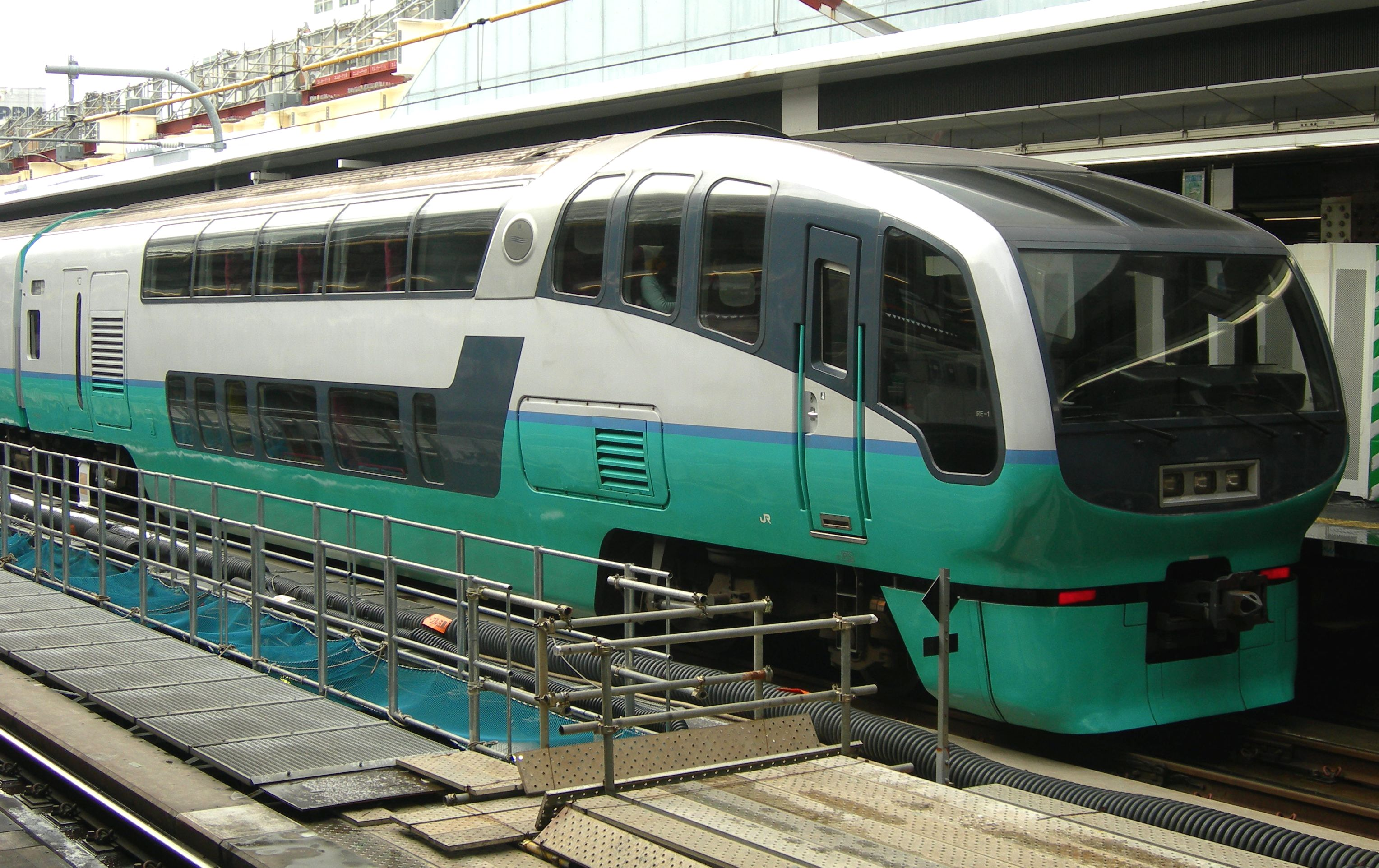
KuHa 251 (car 10)
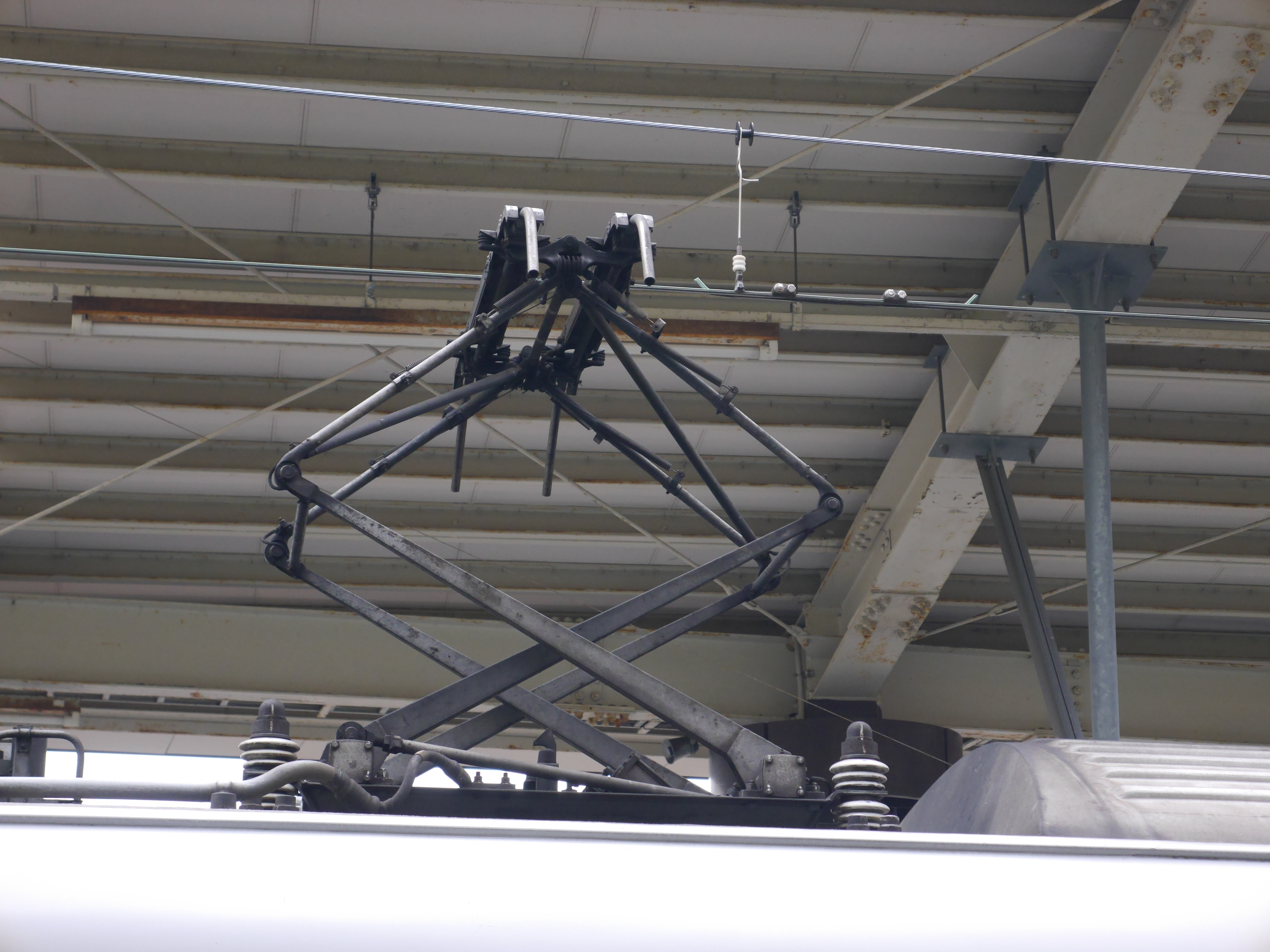
A PS27 pantograph on a 251 series set in August 2016

== Interior ==
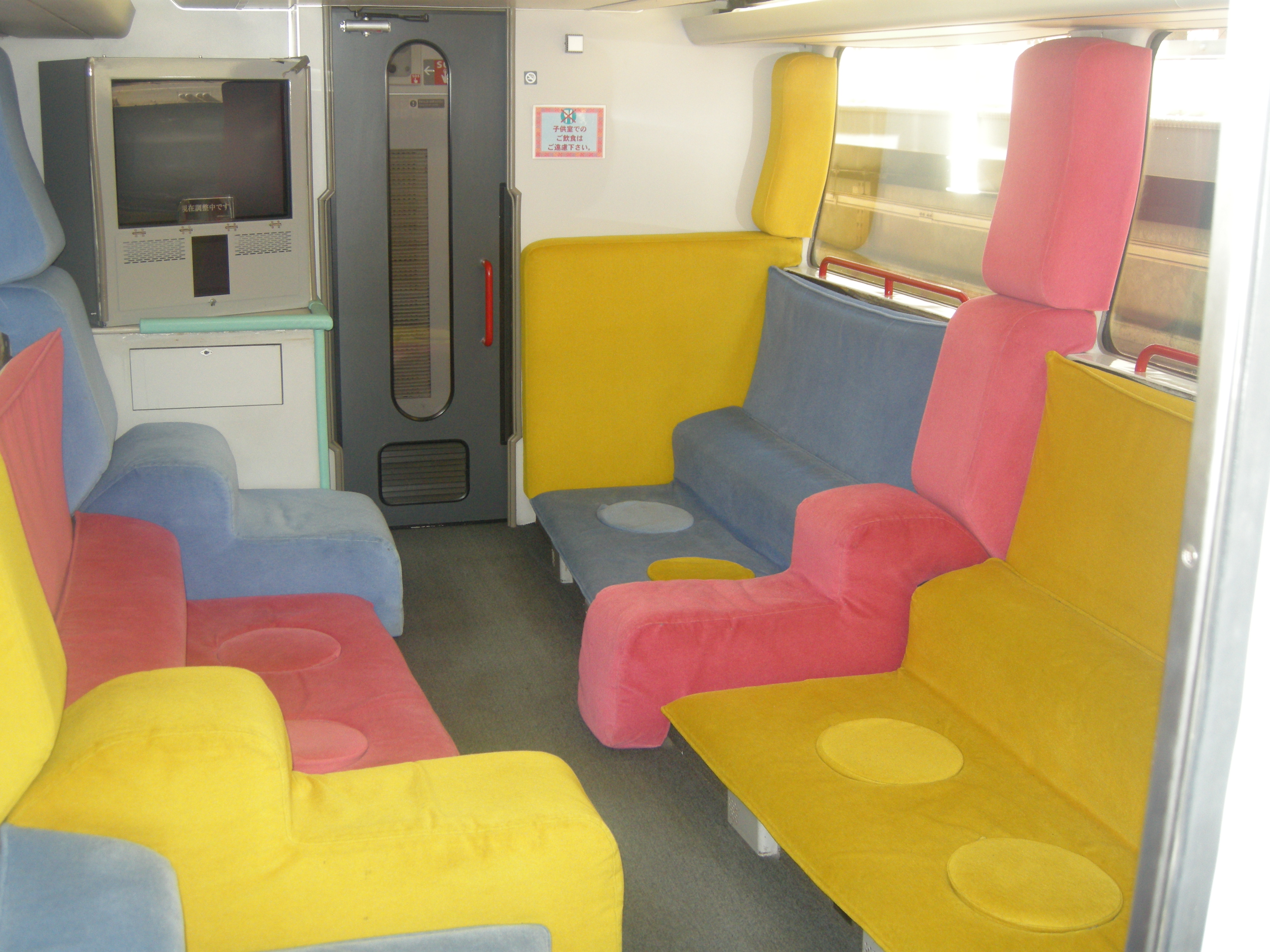
Children's play area on the lower deck of a KuHa 251 car

== History ==
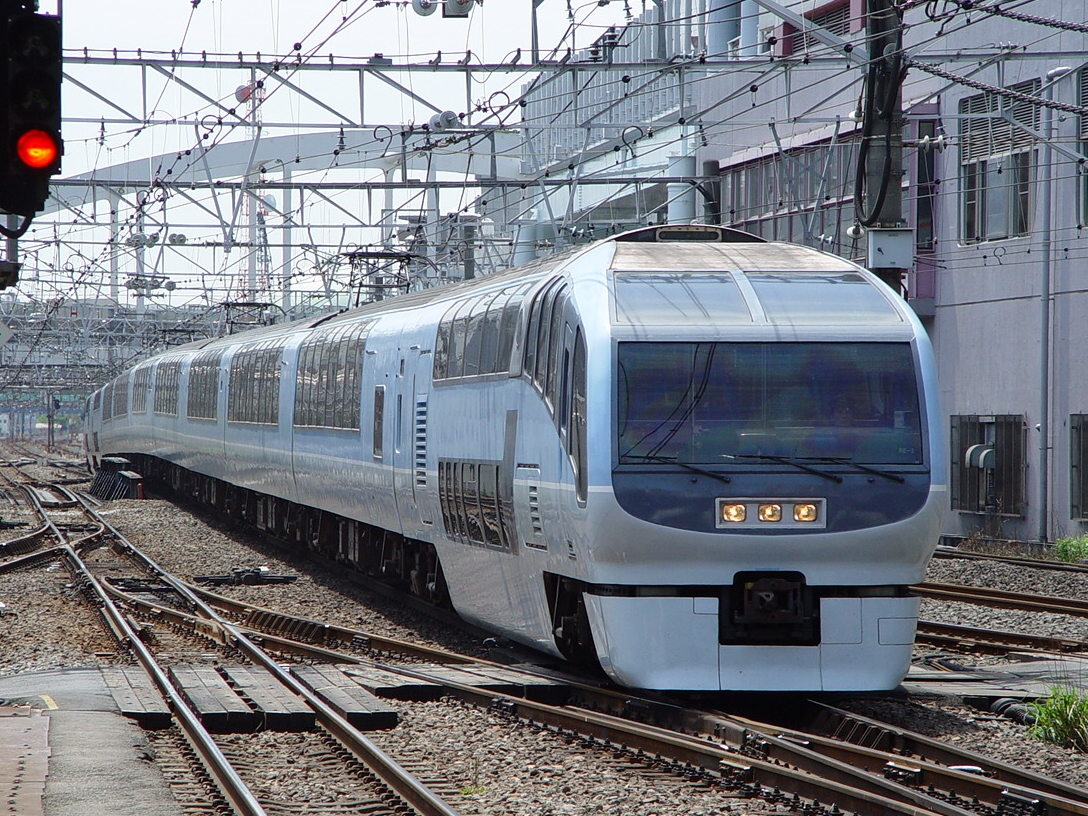
Set RE2 in original livery in April 2003

Built by Kawasaki Heavy Industries and Kinki Sharyo, the first two sets were introduced from 28 April 1990. These were followed by two more sets in 1992.

The 251 series was awarded the 1991 Laurel Prize, presented annually by the Japan Railfan Club. A formal presentation ceremony was held at Shinagawa Station in Tokyo on 1 March 1992.

The fleet underwent a programme of refurbishment between December 2002 and March 2004, which included the addition of new seating, and repainting the sets into a new colour scheme.

== Withdrawal ==
From the start of the revised timetable on 14 March 2020, the 251 series sets were replaced by new E261 series sets on services between Tokyo and Izukyu-Shimoda, with the Super View Odoriko brand being replaced by new ultra-deluxe Saphir Odoriko services. The last 251 series Super View Odoriko limited express run took place on 13 March 2020. After their withdrawal, the trains were transferred to Nagano General Rolling Stock Center for scrapping. No 251 series cars have been preserved.
