= Shin-Tanna Tunnel =

Railway tunnel in Honshu, Japan

Shin-Tanna Railway Tunnel
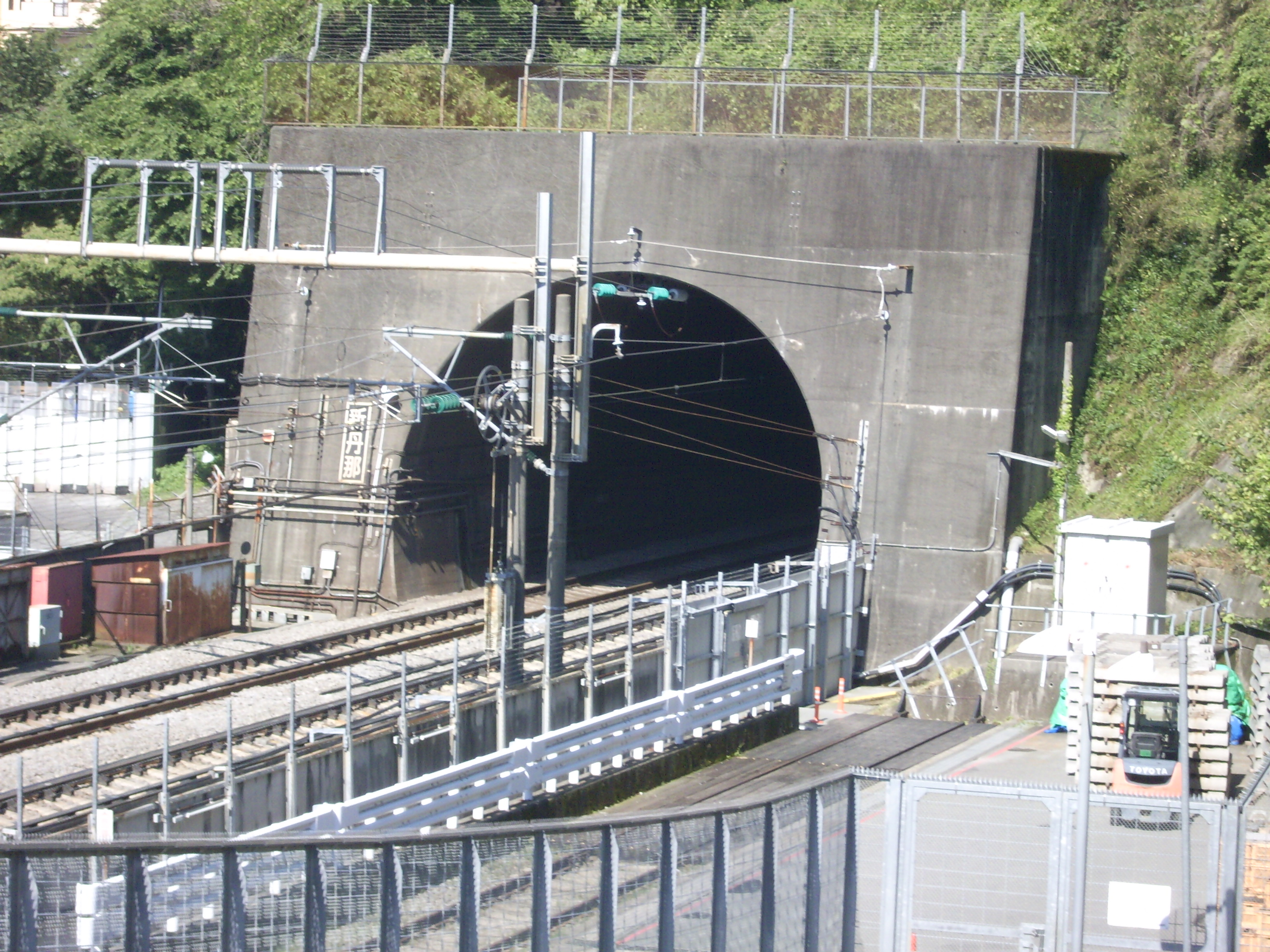
- 新丹那トンネル / Shin-Tanna Tunnel
- Interactive map of Shin-Tanna Railway Tunnel

Overview
- Line: Tōkaidō Shinkansen
- Location: between Kannami town and Atami town
- Coordinates: 35°6′26.7186″N 138°59′28.0026″E
- Status: active

Operation
- Opened: 1964; 62 years ago
- Operator: Central Japan Railway Company
- Traffic: Railway
- Character: Passenger and Freight

Technical
- Line length: 7,959 m (26,112 ft)
- No. of tracks: 2

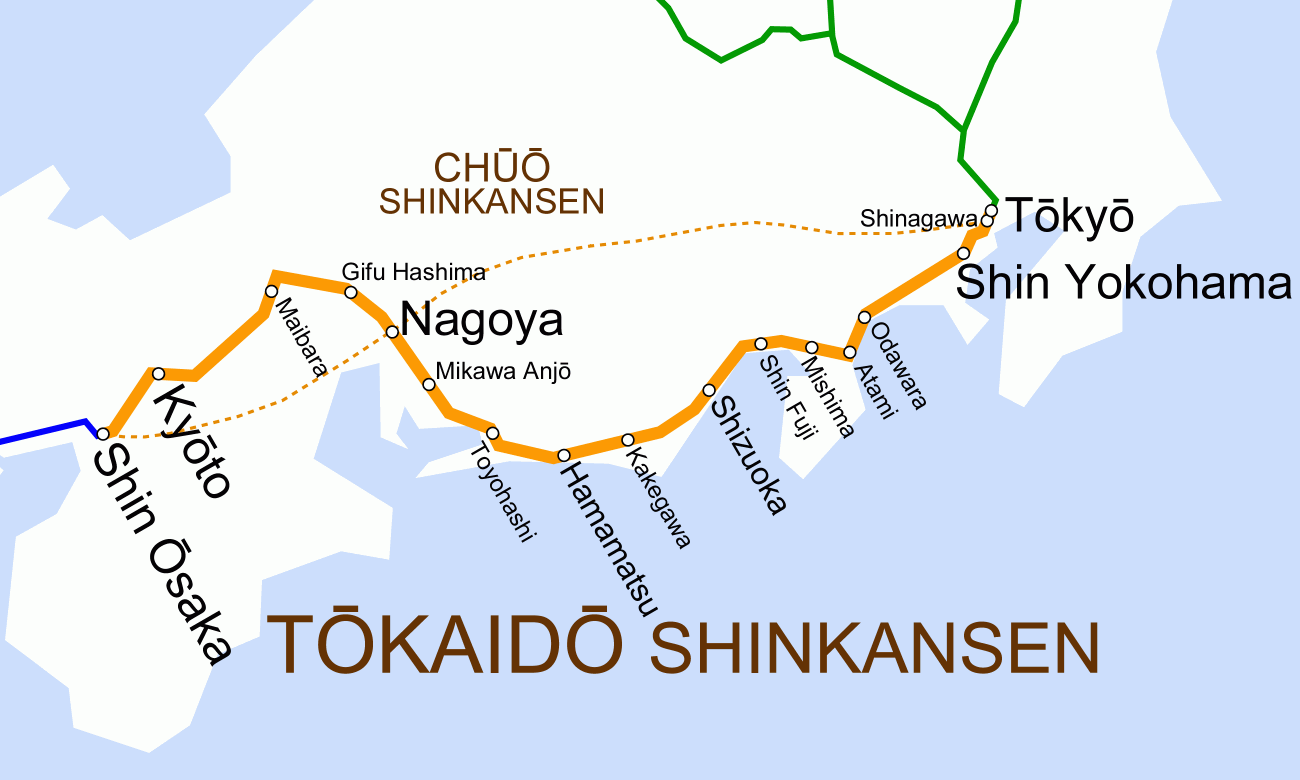
Map of Tokaido Shinkansen line.

Shin-Tanna Tunnel (新丹那トンネル, Shin-Tanna tonneru) is a tunnel on the Tōkaidō Shinkansen that runs from Kannami town and Atami town in Shizuoka city, Shizuoka Prefecture with total length of 7.959 km (4.945 mi). It was built and completed in 1964 located parallel to the old Tanna Tunnel.

== See also ==
- List of tunnels in Japan
- Seikan Tunnel undersea tunnel between Honshu-Hokkaido islands
- Kanmon Railway Tunnel undersea tunnel between Honshu-Kyushu islands
- Sakhalin–Hokkaido Tunnel
- Bohai Strait tunnel
