= Ajiro Station =

Railway station in Atami, Shizuoka Prefecture, Japan

JT24 Ajiro Station 網代駅
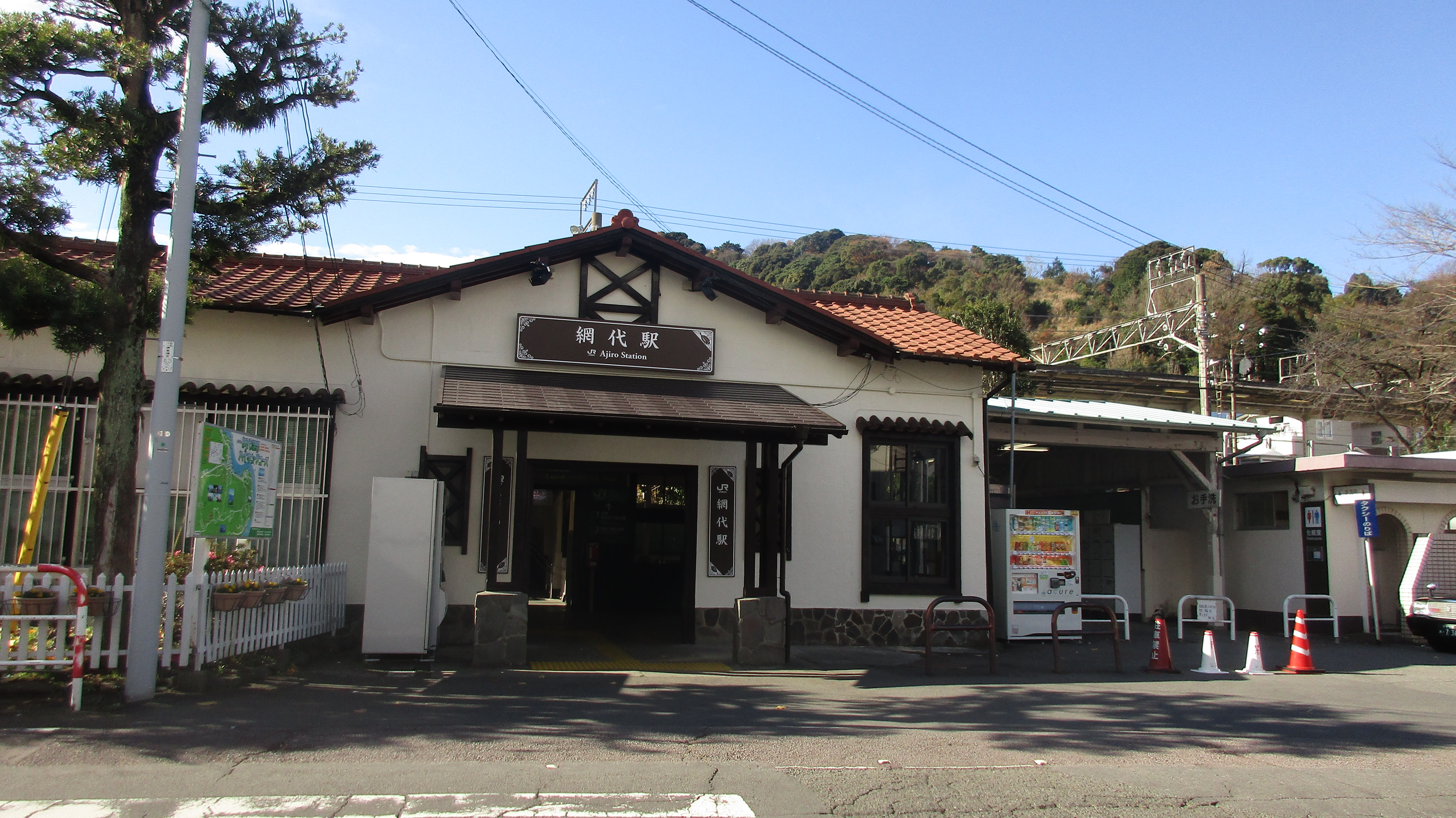
- Ajiro Station in December 2016

General information
- Location: 171-4 Shimo-Taga, Atami-shi, Shizuoka-ken; Japan
- Coordinates: 35°2′37.1″N 139°4′52.34″E
- Operator: JR East
- Line: ■ Itō Line
- Distance: 8.7 kilometers from Atami
- Platforms: 1 island platform

Other information
- Status: Unstaffed
- Website: Official website

History
- Opened: 21 December 1904

Passengers
- FY2013: 922 daily

Services
Preceding station	JR East	Following station
Itō JT26 Terminus	Odoriko	Atami JT21 towards Tokyo
Usami JT25 towards Itō	Itō Line	Izu-Taga JT23 towards Atami
Location
- Location within Shizuoka Prefecture Location within Japan

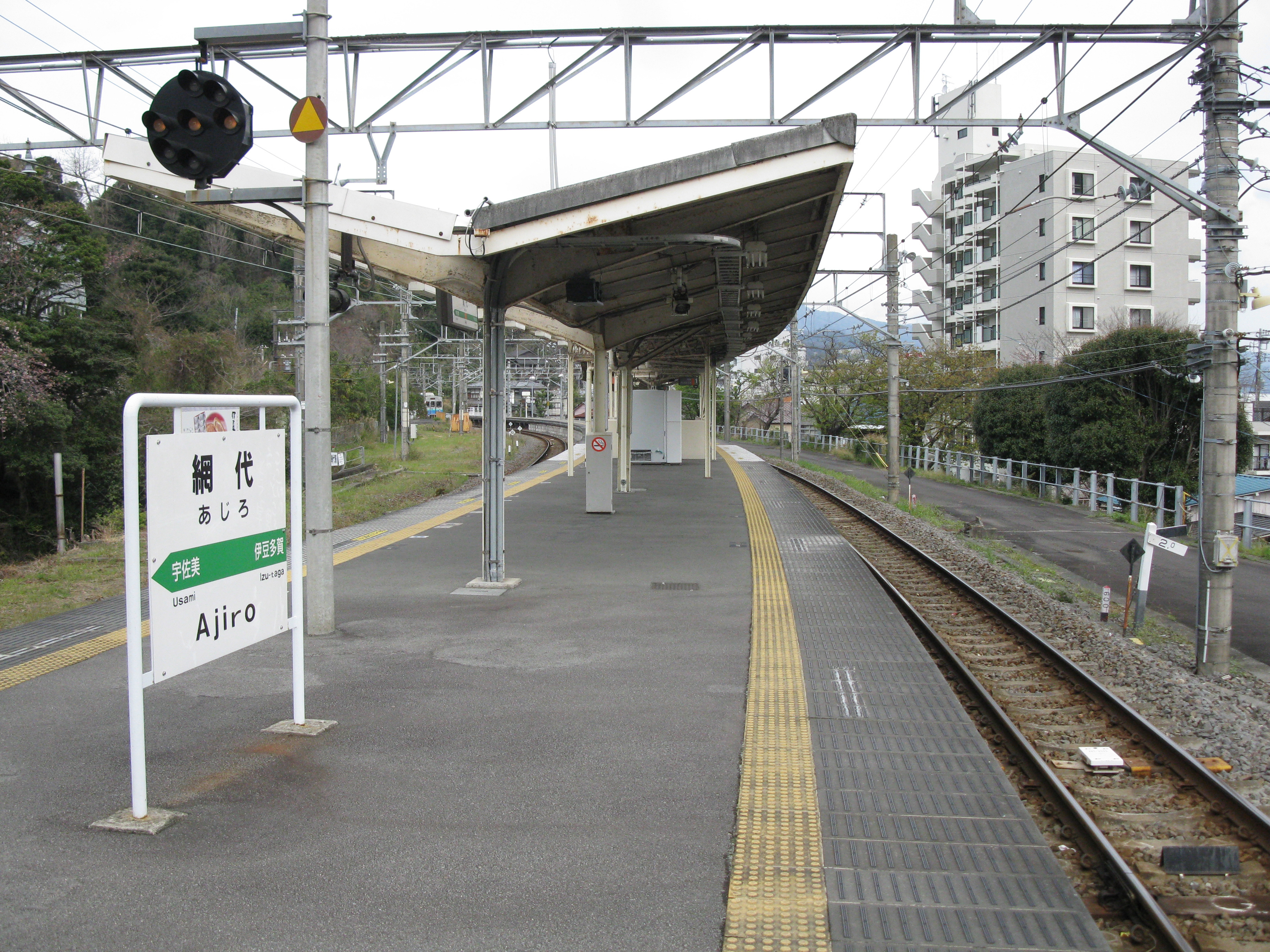
Ajiro Station platform

Ajiro Station (網代駅, Ajiro-eki) is a railway station on the Itō Line of the East Japan Railway Company, located in the southern part of the city of Atami, Shizuoka Prefecture, Japan. It is also a stop for the limited express Odoriko.

== Lines ==
Ajiro Station is served by the Itō Line and is located 8.7 kilometers from the northern terminus of the line at Atami Station and 113.3 kilometers from Tokyo Station.

== Layout ==
Ajiro Station has one island platform on an embankment, with the station building located at a lower level. The station is unattended.

=== Platforms ===
1	Itō Line	for Itō, Izu-Kōgen, Izukyū Shimoda
2	Itō Line (Tōkaidō Line・Ueno-Tokyo Line)	for Atami, Yokohama, Tokyo, Utsunomiya (via Utsunomiya Line), Kagohara (via Takasaki Line)

== History ==
Ajiro Station opened on March 30, 1935, as the terminal station of the Itō Line from Atami; however, the line expanded to Itō Station by December 15, 1938. Freight services were discontinued on January 30, 1963. On April 1, 1987, along with division and privatization of Japan National Railway, East Japan Railway Company started operating this station.

== Passenger statistics ==
In fiscal 2013, the station was used by an average of 922 passengers daily (boarding passengers only).

== Surrounding area ==
- Ajiro fishing port
- Ajiro onsen

== See also ==
- List of railway stations in Japan
