= Atami Station =

Railway station in Atami, Shizuoka Prefecture, Japan

JT21 CA00 Atami Station 熱海駅
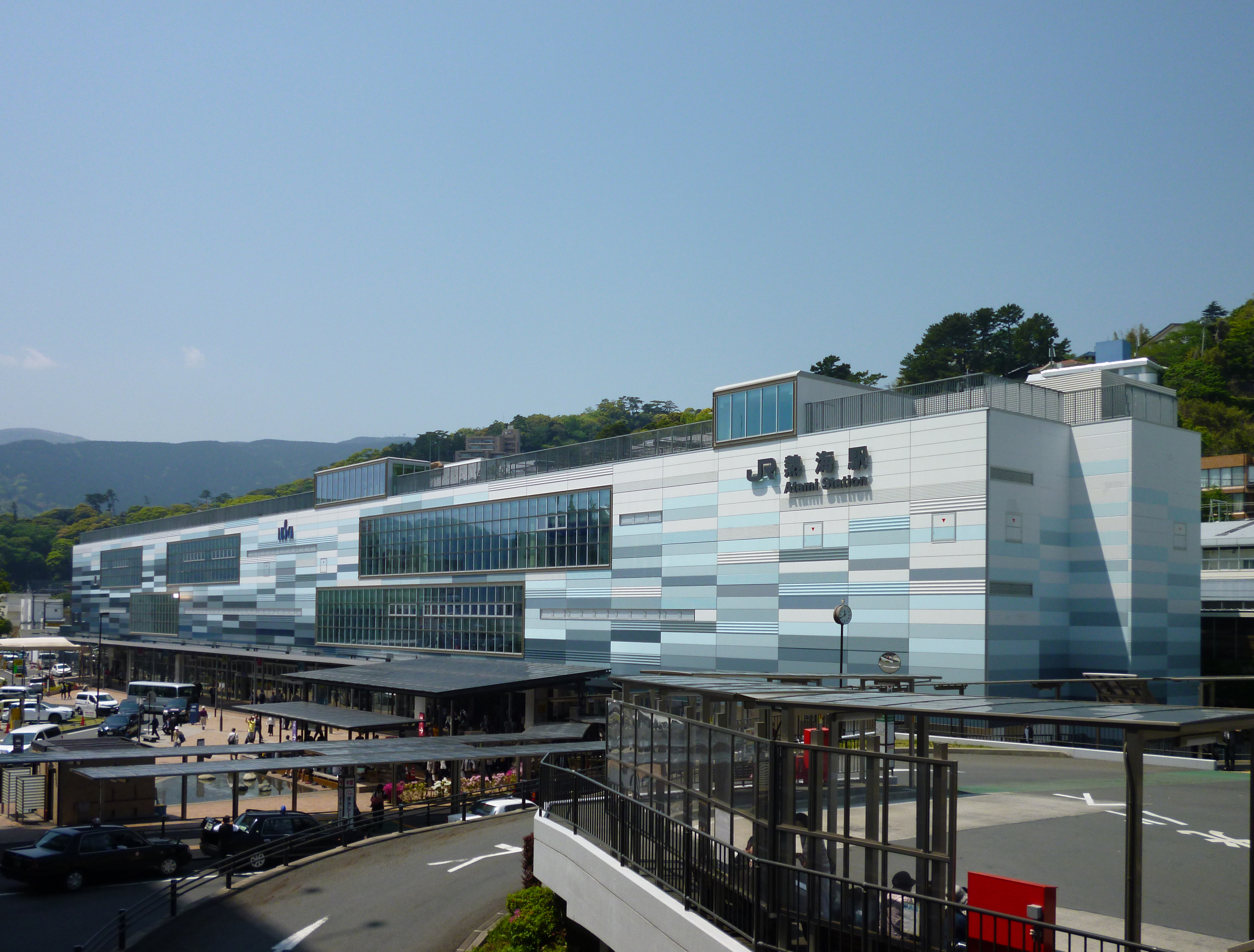
- Atami Station in April 2018

General information
- Location: Tahara Honchō, Atami-shi, Shizuoka-ken 413-0011; Japan
- Coordinates: 35°06′12″N 139°04′40″E
- System: JR East; JR Central
- Operator: JR East (Conventional line section); JR Central (Shinkansen section)
- Lines: Tokaido Shinkansen; Tōkaidō Line; Itō Line
- Distance: 104.6 km (65.0 mi) from Tokyo
- Platforms: 2 side platforms (Shinkansen); 1 side + 2 island platforms (Conventional line)
- Tracks: 7 (2 Shinkansen)
- Train operators: JR East; JR Central
- Connections: Bus terminal

Construction
- Structure type: Elevated

Other information
- Status: Staffed ( "Midori no Madoguchi")
- Station code: JT21; CA00
- Website: Official website

History
- Opened: March 25, 1925; 101 years ago

Passengers
- FY 2023: 19,512 daily (JR East); 9,726 daily (JR Central)

Services
Preceding station	JR Central	Following station
Mishima towards Shin-Ōsaka	Tokaido Shinkansen Hikari Kodama	Odawara towards Tokyo
Other services
Preceding station	JR East	Following station
through to JR Central	Sunrise Izumo and Sunrise Seto	Yokohama towards Tokyo
Itō JT26 Terminus	Saphir Odoriko	Yokohama towards Tokyo or Shinjuku
Ajiro JT24 towards Itō	Odoriko	Yugawara JT20 towards Tokyo
through to JR Central	Odoriko	Yugawara JT20 towards Tokyo
through to Itō Line and JR Central	Tōkaidō Line	Yugawara JT20 towards Tokyo
Kinomiya JT22 towards Itō	Itō Line	through to Tokaido Main Line (JR East)
Preceding station	JR Central	Following station
Numazu CA03 towards Maibara	Sunrise Izumo and Sunrise Seto	through to JR East
Mishima CA02 towards Shuzenji	Odoriko	through to JR East
Kannami CA01 towards Maibara	Tōkaidō Main Line Local	through to JR East
Location
- Location within Shizuoka Prefecture Location within Japan

Atami Station (熱海駅, Atami-eki) is a railway station in the city of Atami, Shizuoka Prefecture, Japan, jointly operated by East Japan Railway Company (JR East) and Central Japan Railway Company (JR Central).

== Lines ==
Atami Station is served by the JR Central Tōkaidō Shinkansen and is 104.6 km from Tokyo Station, as well as Tōkaidō Main Line serves extending westward from Atami. The JR East portion of the station serves the Tōkaidō Main Line between Tokyo Station and Atami, and the station is also the northern terminal station of the Itō Line.

== Station layout ==
Due to its location on the side of a steep hill, Atami Station is built on several levels. On the lowest level is the station building itself, with automated ticket machines, Suica automated turnstiles and a "Midori no Madoguchi" staffed ticket office. The Tōkaidō Main Line and Ito Line share one side platform and two island platforms with five tracks connected by an underground passage to the station building. The Tōkaidō Shinkansen with two opposing side platforms is one level higher, and is connected to the lower platforms by an underground passage.

As a boundary station between JR East and JR Central, facilities for switching from Suica to Toica are provided at the entrance. Passengers from the Suica area bound for trains in the Toica area must exit the station through the Suica gates then enter again through the Toica gates, and the reverse also applies for passengers from the Toica area.

=== Platforms ===
1	Ito Line	for Itō and Izukyū-Shimoda
2,3	■ Tōkaidō Line (JR Central)	for Mishima, Numazu, Shizuoka, and Hamamatsu
2,3	Ito Line	for Itō and Izukyū-Shimoda
4,5	Tōkaidō Line (JR East)・Ueno-Tokyo Line	for Odawara, Yokohama, Tokyo; Utsunomiya Line for Utsunomiya and Kuroiso; Takasaki Line for Takasaki and Maebashi
6	■ Tōkaidō・Sanyō Shinkansen	for Nagoya, Kyōto, Shin-Osaka, Okayama and Hakata
7	■ Tōkaidō Shinkansen	for Odawara, Shin-Yokohama, Shinagawa, and Tokyo

== History ==
Atami Station opened on March 25, 1925. On December 1, 1934, the Tanna Tunnel was completed, and through service to Mishima and Numazu began. The Ito Line began operations at Atami from March 30, 1935. The Tōkaidō Shinkansen opened on October 1, 1964.

Station numbering was introduced to the section of the Tōkaidō Line operated JR Central in March 2018; Atami Station was assigned station number CA00.

== Passenger statistics ==
In fiscal 2017, the local portion of the station was used by an average of 10,653 passengers daily (boarding passengers only), and the Shinkansen portion of the station was used by 4,805 passengers daily (boarding passengers only).

== Surrounding area ==
- MOA Museum of Art

== Accidents ==
On June 27, 2002, at 10:37, a person was hit and killed by a train at the station after climbing down from the platform onto the shinkansen track.

== See also ==
- List of railway stations in Japan
