= Tanna Tunnel =

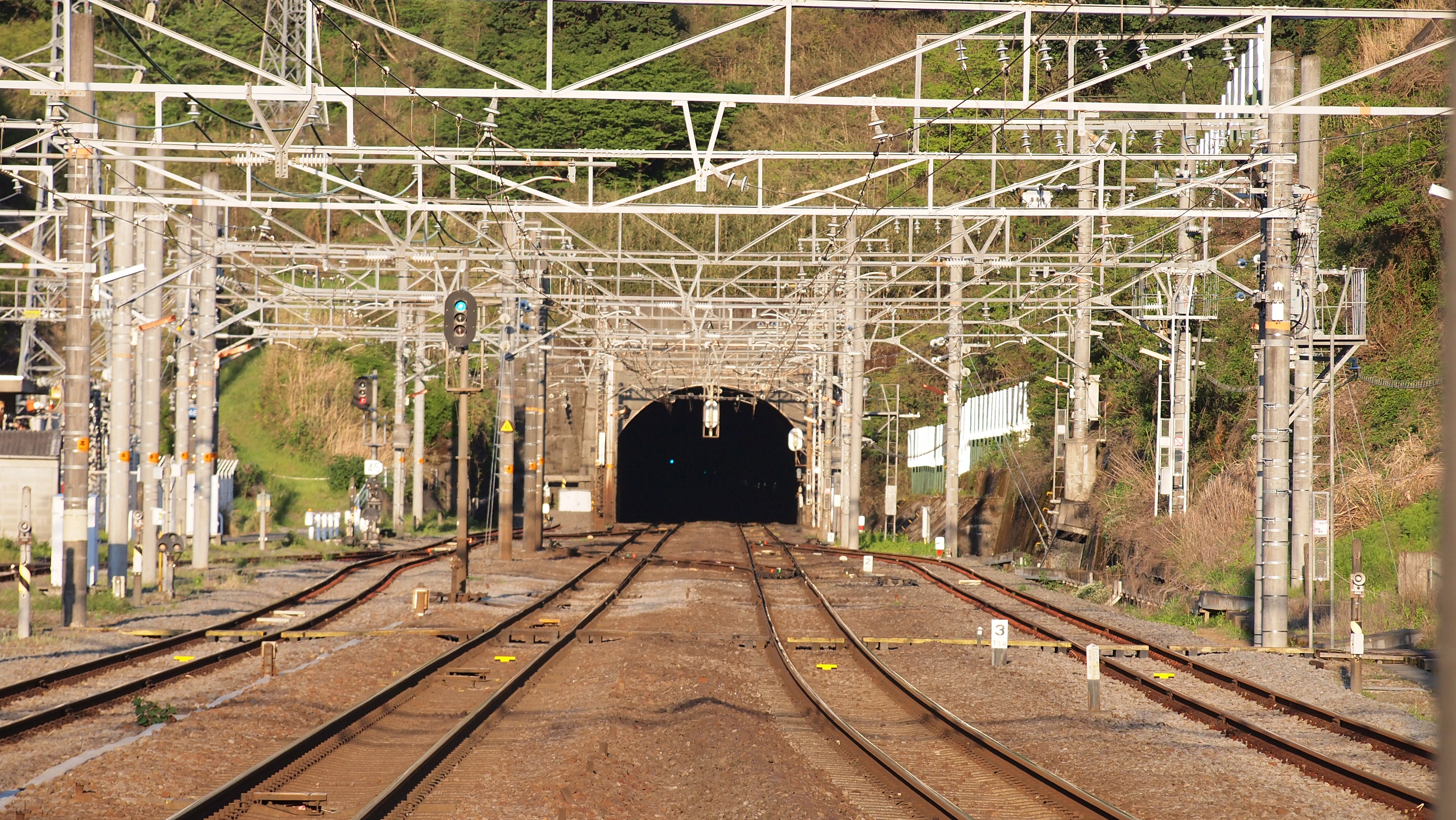
- Viewed from Kannami Station.
- Interactive map of Tanna Tunnel

Overview
- Line: Tōkaidō Main Line
- Location: Shizuoka Prefecture, Japan
- Coordinates: 35°06′16″N 139°01′00″E

Operation
- Opened: 1934
- Operator: JR Central
- Character: passenger/freight

Technical
- Line length: 7,804 meters

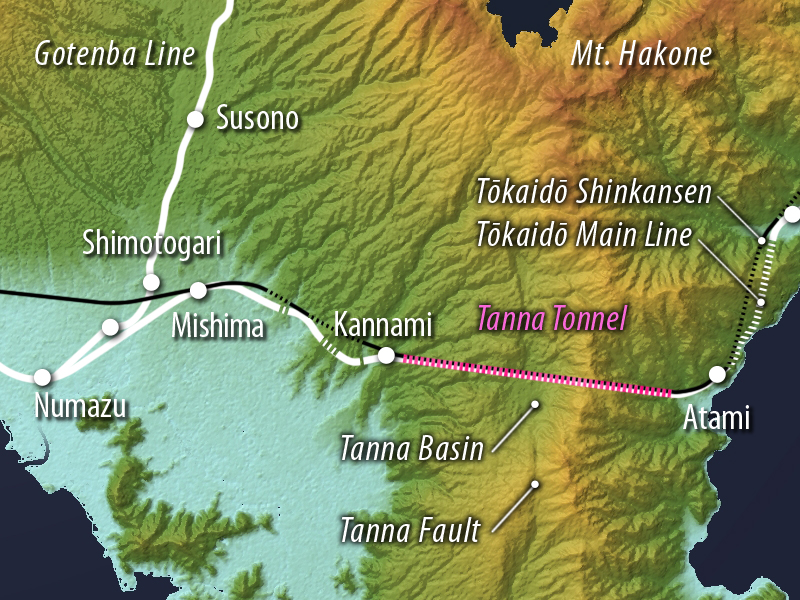
Map

Tanna Tunnel (丹那トンネル, Tanna-tonneru) is a railroad tunnel in Shizuoka Prefecture, Japan operated as part of JR Central’s Tōkaidō Main Line. When opened in 1934 this 7.8 km long tunnel shortened the trunk route between Tokyo and Kobe by 11.7 kilometres and reduced the ruling gradient between Kozu and Numazu from 2.5% (1 in 40) to less than 1% (1 in 100). It superseded the original route (now the Gotemba Line) which could be described as a detour round the mountains between Atami and Numazu.

== History ==
The initial routing of the Tōkaidō Main Line railway, connecting Tokyo with Osaka, avoided the Hakone mountains between Shizuoka and Kanagawa Prefectures by taking a circuitous route north to Gotemba and then south to Numazu. This route is now known as the Gotemba Line and the Tōmei Expressway approximately follows the same path.

Recognizing that the Gotemba alignment created a significant bottleneck in the rail system, the Japanese Railroad Ministry issued a contract in 1918 to the Kajima Corporation to build a tunnel through the Hakone mountains. The project was promoted as a major public works initiative intended to help boost Japan’s economy following the post-World War I economic recession.

However, the construction of the 7,804-meter tunnel proved extremely challenging due to numerous unforeseen issues with the local geology and contemporary tunneling technology. The Hakone mountain range is an active volcanic zone, containing a number of faults and frequently experiencing earthquakes. In addition, workers faced problems with significant water seepage, soft rock formations, and hot spring water vents. On April 1, 1920, a large section of the tunnel collapsed from the Atami side, trapping 42 workers. Despite heroic efforts to rescue them, only 17 workers were saved a week later. The tunnel was also damaged during the Great Kantō earthquake, although no fatalities occurred. Another collapse took place on February 26, 1930, during an earthquake, resulting in the deaths of five more workers. The project took far longer and cost much more than originally anticipated, with a total of 67 workers losing their lives during construction.

The two ends of the tunnel were joined on June 19, 1933, and the Tanna Tunnel opened to rail traffic on March 10, 1934. At the time of its completion, it was Japan’s second-longest tunnel, only surpassed by the Shimizu Tunnel once it was finished.

The story of the construction of the Tanna Tunnel was the subject of a stage play by Hideji Hōjō in 1942.

The Tanna Tunnel remains in operation on the Tōkaidō Main Line to this day. Traffic on the Tōkaidō Shinkansen uses the parallel Shin-Tanna Tunnel (7,950m) completed in 1963.
