= Kuzumi Station =

Railway station in Narita, Chiba Prefecture, Japan

Kuzumi Station 久住駅
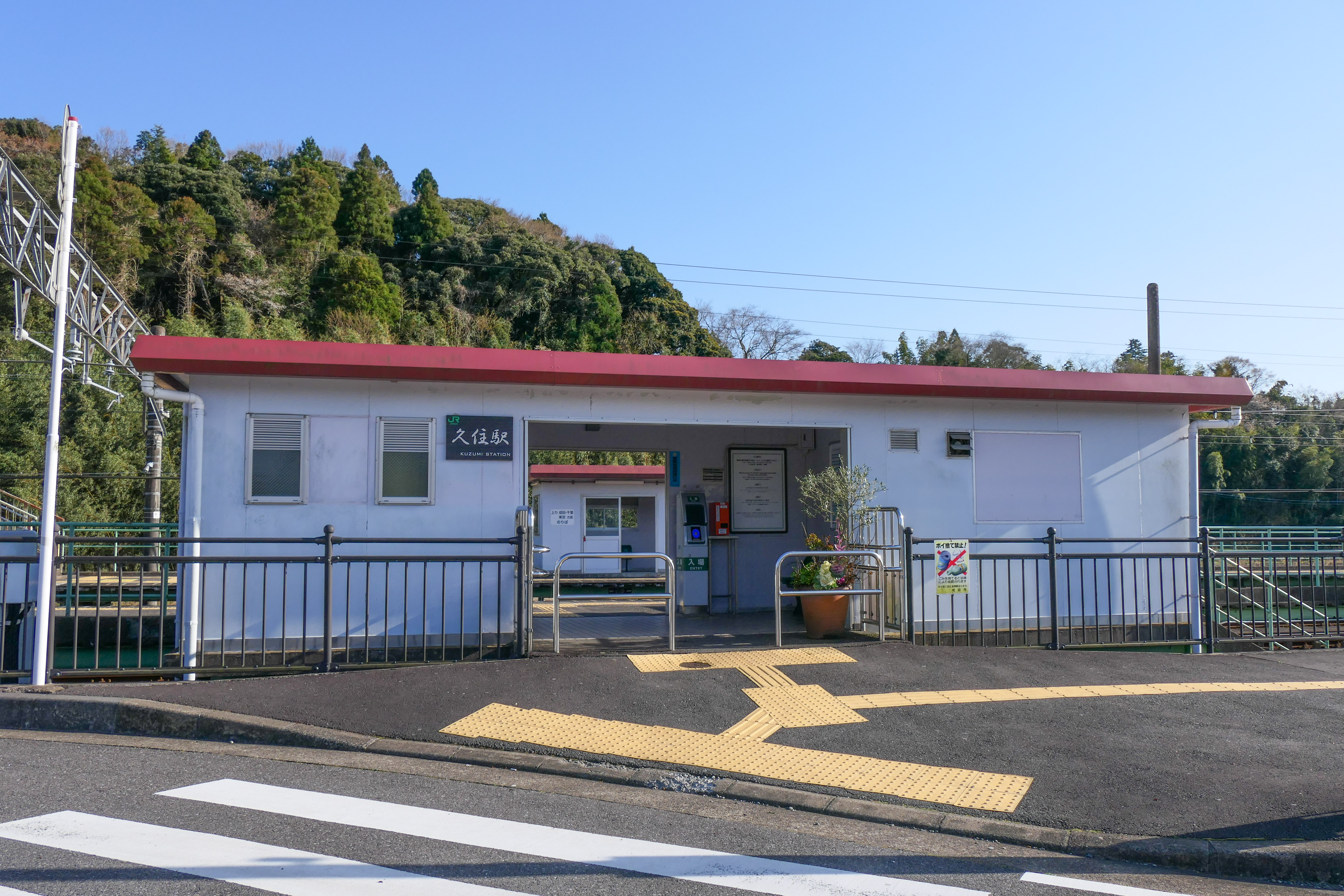
- Kuzumi Station, March 2021

General information
- Location: Inooka19-1, Narita-shi, Chiba-ken 286-0813; Japan
- Coordinates: 35.8324°N 140.3390°E
- Operator: JR East
- Line: ■ Narita Line
- Distance: 20.0 km from Sakura
- Platforms: 2 side platforms

Other information
- Status: Unstaffed
- Website: Official website

History
- Opened: July 1, 1901

Passengers
- FY2006: 238

Services
Preceding station	JR East	Following station
Narita JO35 towards Chiba	Narita Line	Namegawa towards Chōshi
Location
- Location within Chiba Prefecture Location within Japan

Kuzumi Station (久住駅, Kuzumi-eki) is a passenger railway station in the city of Narita, Chiba, Japan, operated by the East Japan Railway Company (JR East).

== Lines ==
Kuzumi Station is served by the Narita Line, and is located 20.0 kilometers from the terminus of line at Sakura Station.

== Station layout ==
The station consists of dual opposed side platforms connected by a footbridge to a small one-story station building. The station is unattended.

=== Platforms ===
1	■ Narita Line	For Sawara, Chōshi, Kashima-Jingu
2	■ Narita Line	For Narita, Sakura, Chiba

== History ==
Kuzumi Station was opened on July 1, 1901 as a station on the Narita Railway for both passenger and freight operations. The Narita Railway was nationalised on September 1, 1920, becoming part of the Japanese Government Railway (JGR). After World War II, the JGR became the Japan National Railways (JNR). Scheduled freight operations were suspended from October 1, 1962. The station has been unattended since July 1, 1970, and a new station building was completed in 1980. The station was absorbed into the JR East network upon the privatization of the Japan National Railways (JNR) on April 1, 1987.

== Passenger statistics ==
In fiscal 2019, the station was used by an average of 809 passengers daily (boarding passengers only).

== Surrounding area ==
- Narita Municipal Kuzumi Junior High School
- Narita Municipal Kuzumi Elementary School
- Kuzumi Post Office

== See also ==
- List of railway stations in Japan
