= Yotsukaidō Station =

Railway station in Yotsukaidō, Chiba Prefecture, Japan

JO31 Yotsukaidō Station 四街道駅
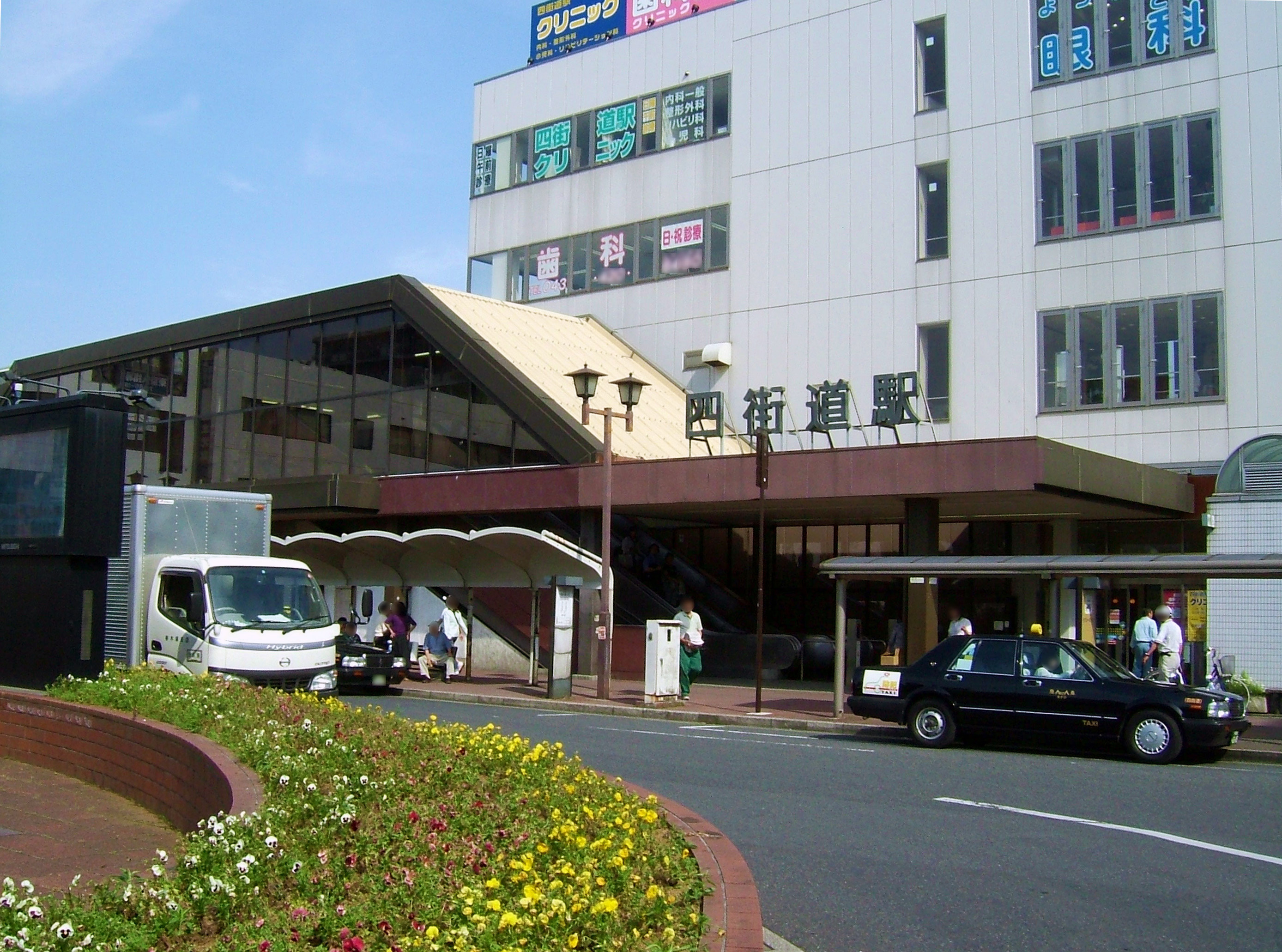
- Station building

General information
- Location: 1-1-1 Yotsukaidō, Yotsukaidō-shi, Chiba-ken 284-0005; Japan
- Coordinates: 35°39′46.79″N 140°9′55.99″E
- Operator: JR East
- Line: ■ Sōbu Main Line
- Distance: 46.9 km from Tokyo
- Platforms: 1 side + 1 island platform

Other information
- Status: Staffed (Midori no Madoguchi)
- Station code: JO31
- Website: Official website

History
- Opened: December 9, 1894

Passengers
- FY2019: 21,975

Services
Preceding station	JR East	Following station
Chiba JO28 (rush periods) towards Shinjuku or Ōfuna	Narita Express (rush periods)	Sakura JO33 (rush periods) towards Narita Airport Terminal 1
Chiba JO28 towards Tokyo	Shiosai (limited service)	Sakura JO33 towards Chōshi
Tsuga JO30 towards Chiba	Sōbu Main / Narita lines Rapid	Monoi JO32 towards Narita Airport Terminal 1
Tsuga JO30 towards Chiba	Sōbu Main / Narita lines Local	Monoi JO32 towards Chōshi, Abiko or Narita Airport Terminal 1
Location
- Location within Chiba Prefecture Location within Japan

Yotsukaidō Station (四街道駅, Yotsukaidō-eki) is a passenger railway station in the city of Yotsukaidō, Chiba Prefecture, Japan, operated by the East Japan Railway Company (JR East).

== Lines ==
Yotsukaidō Station is served by the Sōbu Main Line between Tokyo and Chōshi, and is located 46.9 kilometers from the western terminus of the Sōbu Main Line at Tokyo Station.

== Station layout ==
The station consists of a single side platform and an island platform connected to the station building by a footbridge. The station has a Midori no Madoguchi staffed ticket office.

=== Platforms ===
0	■ Sōbu Main Line	for Chiba and Tokyo (some trains for Narita and Chōshi)
1	■ Sōbu Main Line	for Chiba and Tokyo
2	■ Sōbu Main Line	for Sakura, Narutō and Chōshi
2	■ Narita Line	for Sakura, Narita, Narita Airport (Terminal 2·3 and Terminal 1), Sawara and Chōshi

== History ==
Yotsukaidō Station was opened on December 9, 1894 as a station on the Sōbu Railway for both passenger and freight operations. On September 1, 1907, the Sōbu Railway was nationalised, becoming part of the Japanese Government Railway (JGR). After World War II, the JGR became the Japan National Railways (JNR). Scheduled freight operations were suspended from February 1, 1974. A new elevated station building was completed in December 1981. The station was absorbed into the JR East network upon the privatization of the Japan National Railways (JNR) on April 1, 1987. A new station building was completed in 2002.

== Passenger statistics ==
In fiscal 2019, the station was used by an average of 21,975 passengers daily

== Surrounding area ==
- Yotsukaidō City Hall
- Yotsukaidō High School

== See also ==
- List of railway stations in Japan
