= E131 series =

Japanese train type

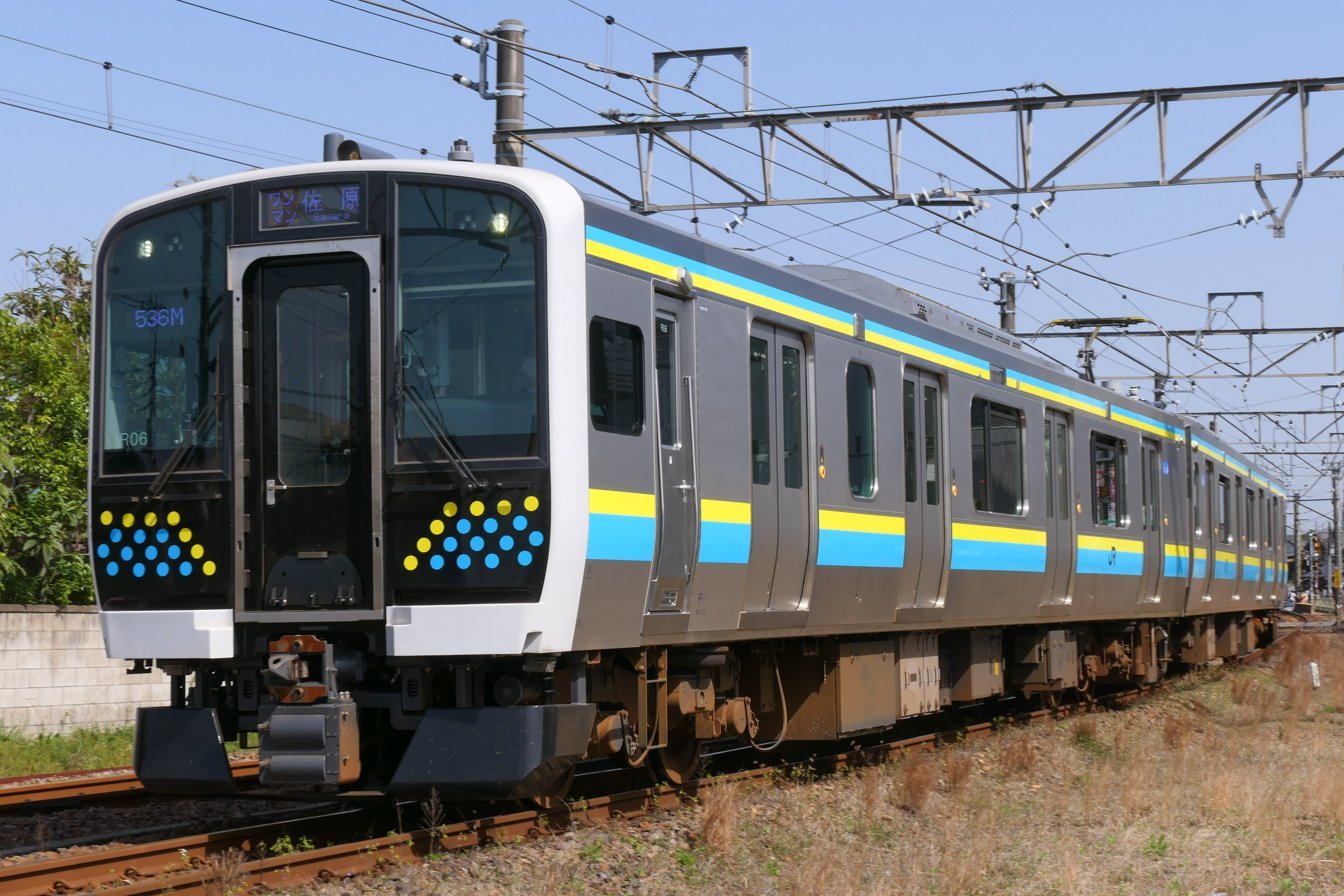
- Manufacturer: J-TREC
- Built at: Akiha-ku, Niigata
- Family name: sustina
- Replaced: 205 series, 209-2000/2100 series, 211 series
- Constructed: 2020−present
- Entered service: 13 March 2021
- Number under construction: 12 vehicles (4 sets)
- Number built: 245 vehicles (77 sets)
- Number in service: 223 vehicles (67 sets)
- Formation: 2–4 cars per trainset
- Operator: JR East

Specifications
- Car body construction: Stainless steel
- Car length: 19.57 m (64 ft 2 in) (end cars); 19.5 m (64 ft 0 in) (intermediate cars); 20 m (65 ft 7 in) (from coupler to coupler)
- Width: 2.95 m (9 ft 8 in)
- Height: 3.62 m (11 ft 11 in); (3.95 m (13 ft 0 in) with pantograph up)
- Floor height: 1.13 m (3 ft 8 in)
- Doors: 4 pairs per side
- Maximum speed: 110 km/h (68 mph)
- Traction system: Hitachi hybrid-SiC/IGBT–VVVF
- Traction motors: MT83 150 kW (201 hp) 3-phase AC induction motor
- Transmission: 7.07:1 (99:14) gear ratio
- Electric systems: Overhead line, 1,500 V DC
- Current collection: Pantograph
- Track gauge: 1,067 mm (3 ft 6 in)

The E131 series (Japanese: E131系) is an electric multiple unit (EMU) train type operated by the East Japan Railway Company (JR East). It began operations in the Chiba area on 13 March 2021, on the Sagami Line on 18 November 2021, and on the Nikkō Line and the Utsunomiya Line on 12 March 2022. The trains are equipped for one-man operation (ワンマン, wanman).

== Design ==
The E131 series trains have stainless steel bodies. They have LCD passenger information displays above the doors, as well as wheelchair-accessible and stroller-accessible "free spaces" on all cars. As they are equipped for "wanman" driver-only operation, body-mounted cameras are utilized to monitor passengers boarding and alighting the train; these cameras are then fed to displays located in the driver's cab. They also feature semi-automatic doors, allowing passengers to operate the doors during driver-only operation.

Internally, the trains are equipped with security cameras and emergency call switches.

Some trains in each subseries are numbered -X80, as they have a slightly different equipment configuration due to the presence of track monitoring equipment.

LED destination board, displaying information in both Japanese and English (E131-0 series)

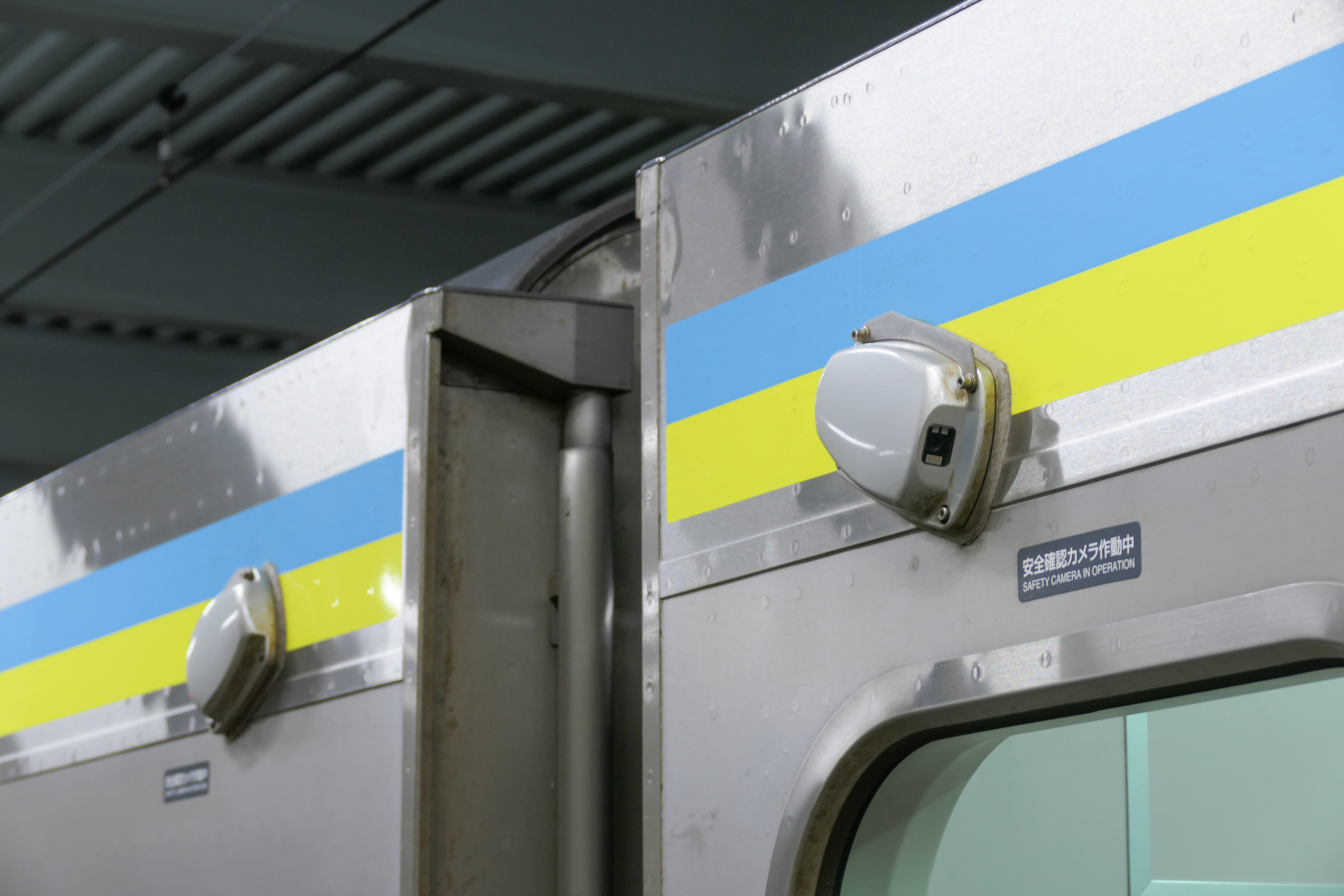
External security cameras (E131-0 series)

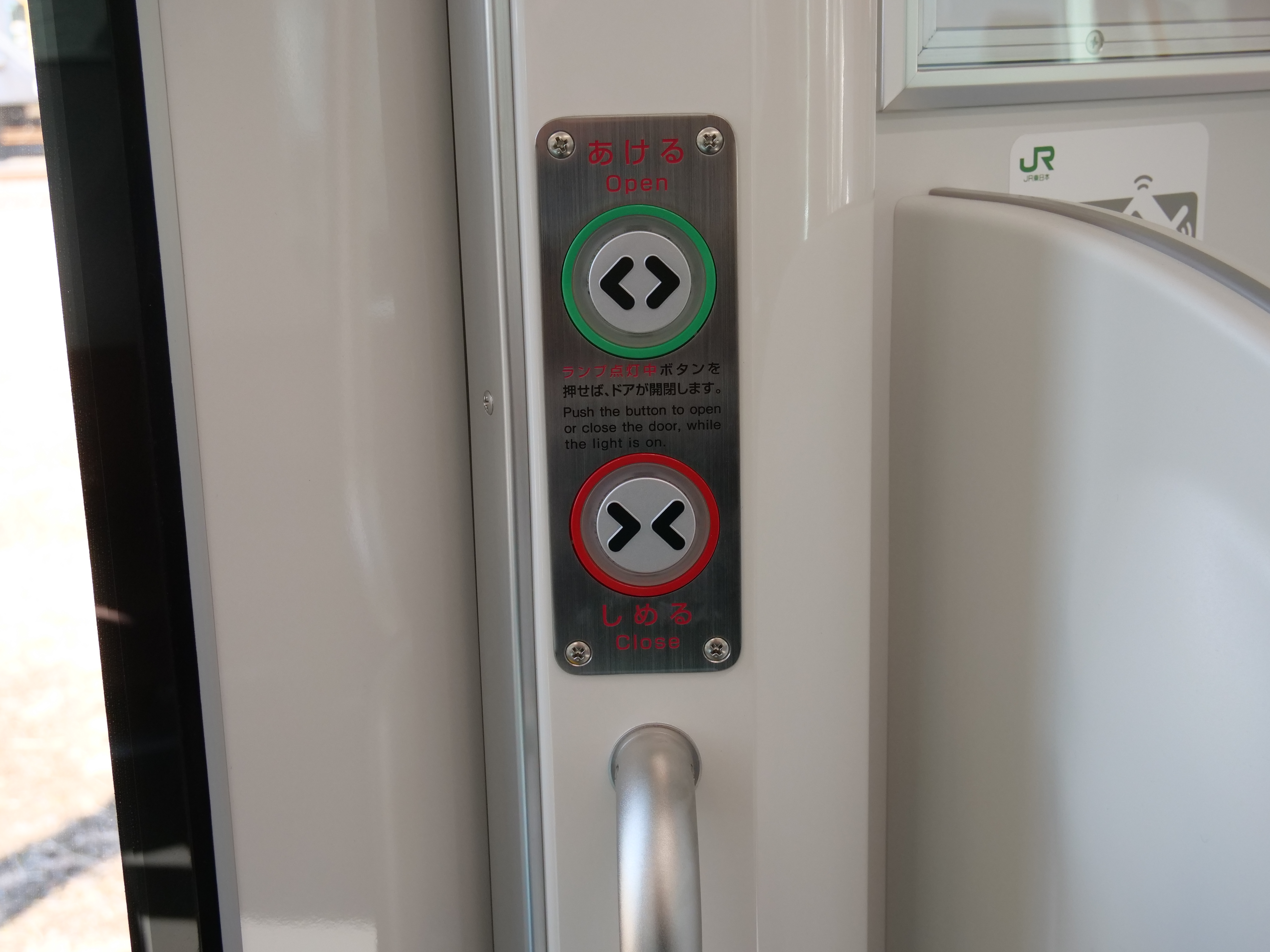
Internal passenger door buttons (E131-600 series)

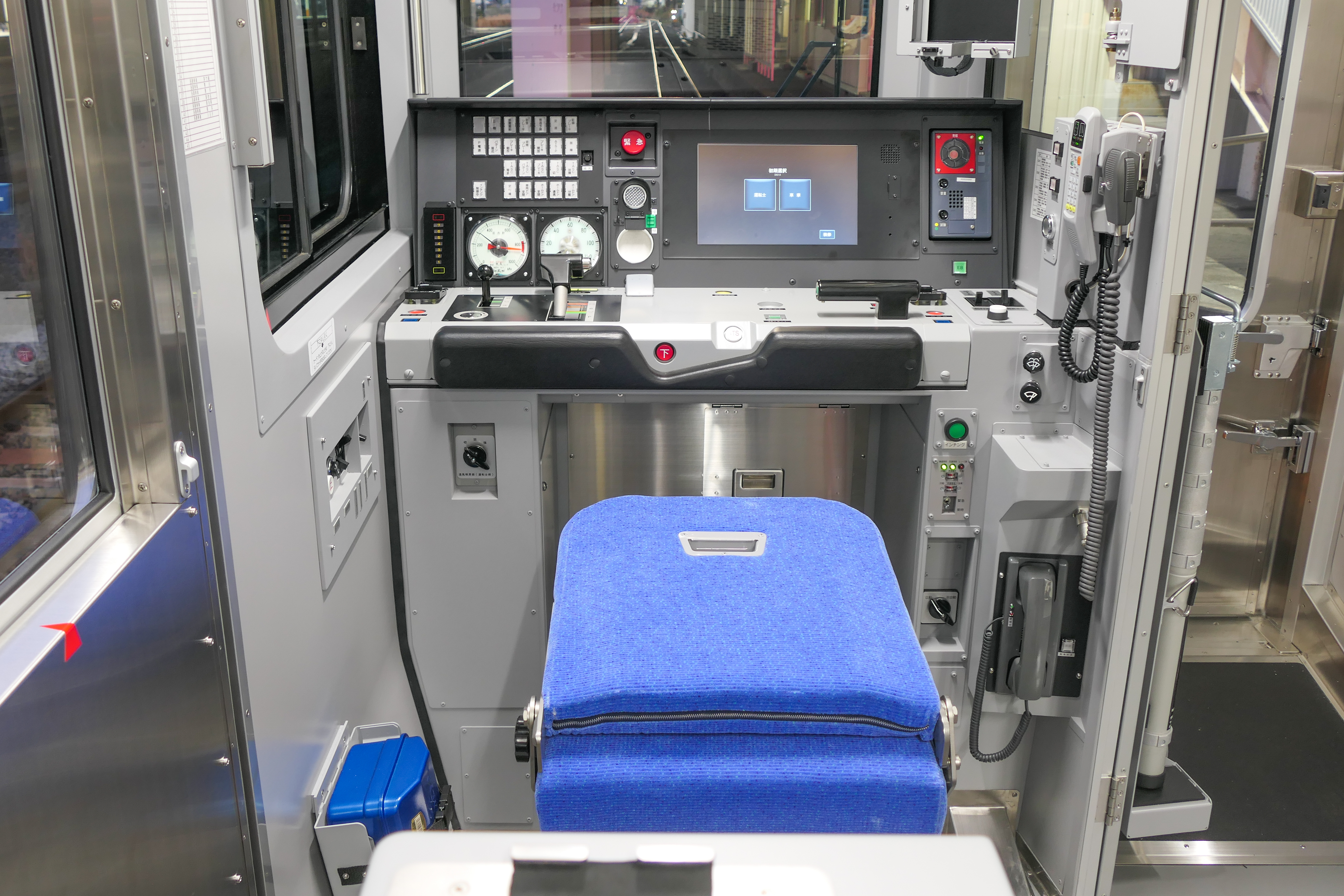
Driver's cab (E131-500 series)

== Variants ==
- E131-0/-80 series: 2-car sets used on the Kashima Line, Narita Line, Sotobō Line, and Uchibō Line
- E131-200/-280 series: 3-car sets used on the Chūō Main Line, Shinonoi Line, Shin'etsu Main Line, and Fujikyuko Line
- E131-500/-580 series: 4-car sets used on the Sagami Line (previously also used on Yokohama Line through services)
- E131-600/-680 series: 3-car sets used on the Nikkō Line and Utsunomiya Line
- E131-800/-880 series: 4-car sets used on the Senseki Line
- E131-1000/-1080 series: 3-car sets used on the Tsurumi Line

== History ==
The series and its scheduled introduction into the Sotobō Line (Kazusa-Ichinomiya – Awa-Kamogawa), Uchibō Line (Kisarazu – Awa-Kamogawa), and Kashima Line (Katori – Kashimajingū) was announced on 5 May 2020. It was the first all-new series introduced in the region in 51 years since the 113 series in the late 1960s; the previous 211 series and 209 series were transferred from other lines. On 18 December 2020, it was further announced that the series would operate certain services on the Narita Line (Narita – Katori) and Kashima Line (Katori – Sawara).

On 17 June 2021, JR East announced that a new subseries will be introduced on the Sagami Line (Chigasaki – Hashimoto) in late 2021, and another subseries will be introduced into the Nikkō Line (Utsunomiya – Nikkō) and the Utsunomiya Line (Oyama – Kuroiso) in Spring 2022.

On 24 December 2024, JR East announced another subseries that will run on the Senseki Line in the Sendai area.

On 7 May 2026, JR East designated a new subseries to be the replacement of 211 series trains on the Chuo, Shinonoi, and Shin'etsu Lines.

== E131-0/-80 series ==
E131-0/-80 series
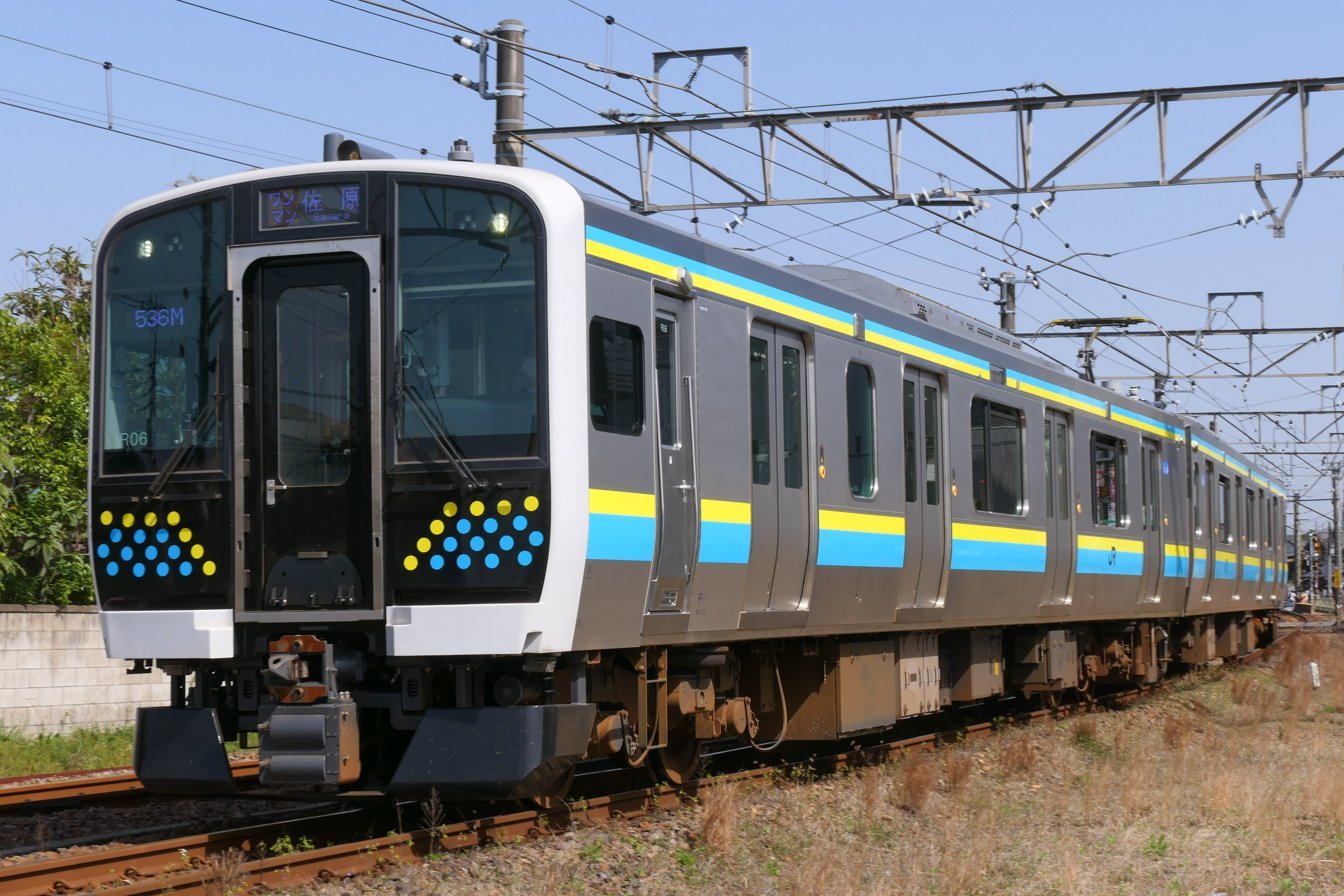
- R06 on the Narita Line in March 2021

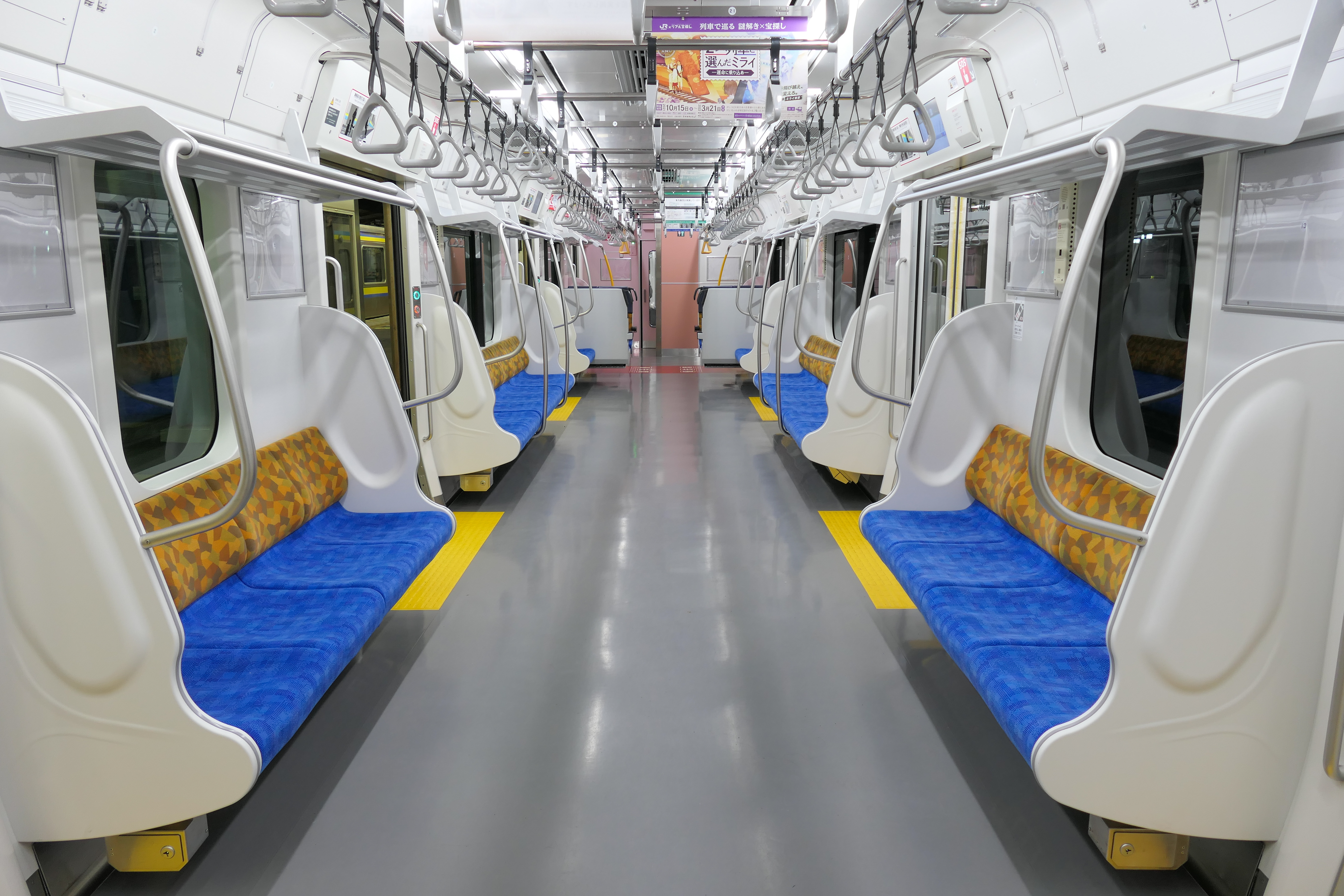
- Interior (October 2021)
- Replaced: 209-2000/2100 series
- Constructed: 2020−2021
- Entered service: 13 March 2021
- Number built: 24 vehicles (12 sets)
- Number in service: 24 vehicles (12 sets)
- Formation: 2 cars per trainset
- Fleet numbers: R01–R12
- Depot: Makuhari
- Lines served: ■ Kashima Line; ■ Narita Line; ■ Sotobō Line; ■ Uchibō Line

Specifications
- Train length: 40 m (131 ft 3 in) (including couplers)
- Traction motors: 4 × 150 kW (201 hp)
- Power output: 600 kW (805 hp)
- UIC classification: Bo′Bo′+2′2′

A total of 12 two-car sets were ordered and built. Test runs began in July 2020, starting with the first two delivered sets R01 and R02. The first ten sets (R01–R10) entered passenger service on 13 March 2021.

The trains are painted in the Uchibo/Sotobo Line color scheme and formed as two-car sets with four doors per car.

=== Lines served ===
The series serves the following sections of lines:

- Sotobō Line: Kazusa-Ichinomiya – Awa-Kamogawa
- Uchibō Line: Kisarazu – Awa-Kamogawa
- Kashima Line: Katori – Kashimajingū
- Narita Line: Narita – Katori

=== Formations ===
As of 19 March 2021, 12 two-car sets (R01–R12) are based at Makuhari Rolling Stock Centre in Chiba Prefecture and formed with 1 motored ("M") car and 1 trailer ("T") car.

	← Kashimajingū, Kazusa-Ichinomiya Narita, Kisarazu →	
Designation	Mc	Tc'
Numbering	KuMoHa E131-0/-80	KuHa E130-0/-80

- The KuMoHa E131 car has a single-arm pantograph.
- Both cars have an accessible/priority "free space".
- The KuHa E130 car has a universal design toilet.

=== Interior ===
Passenger accommodation consists of a combination of longitudinal and transverse seating. Priority seating and wheelchair- and stroller-accessible "free spaces" are provided in each car. KuHa E130 features a universal design toilet.

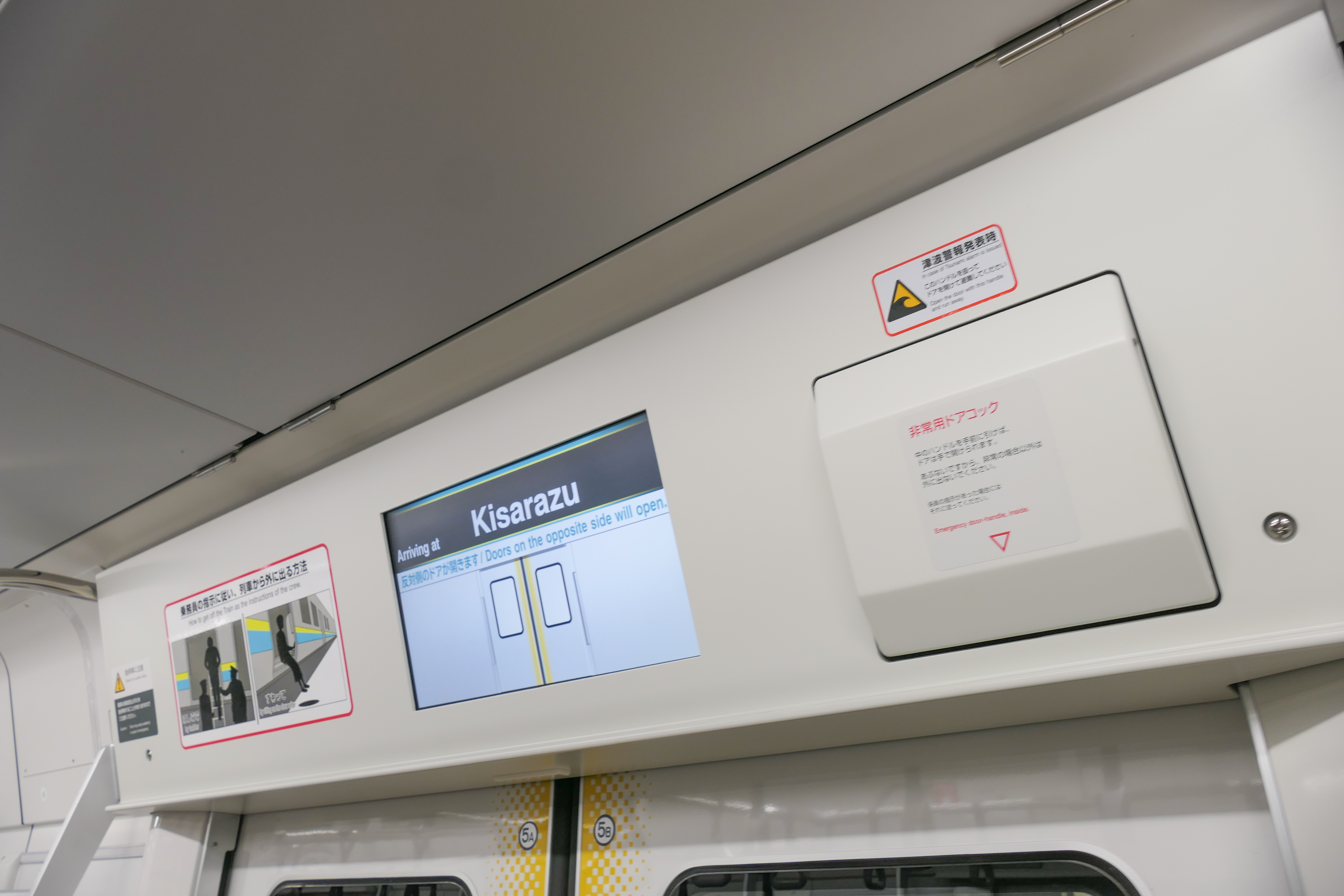
Passenger information display

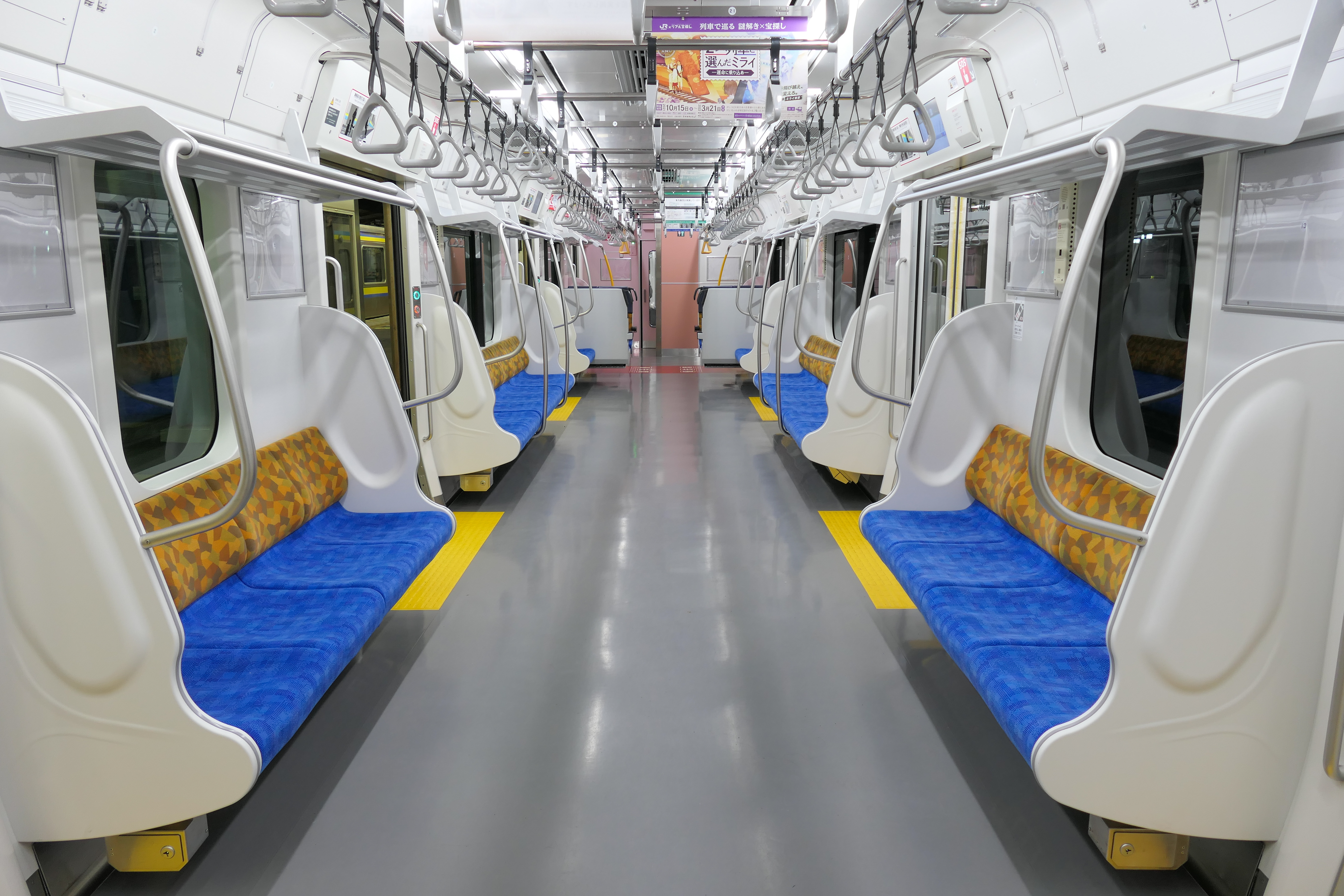
Interior view. Transverse seating bays can be seen at the end.

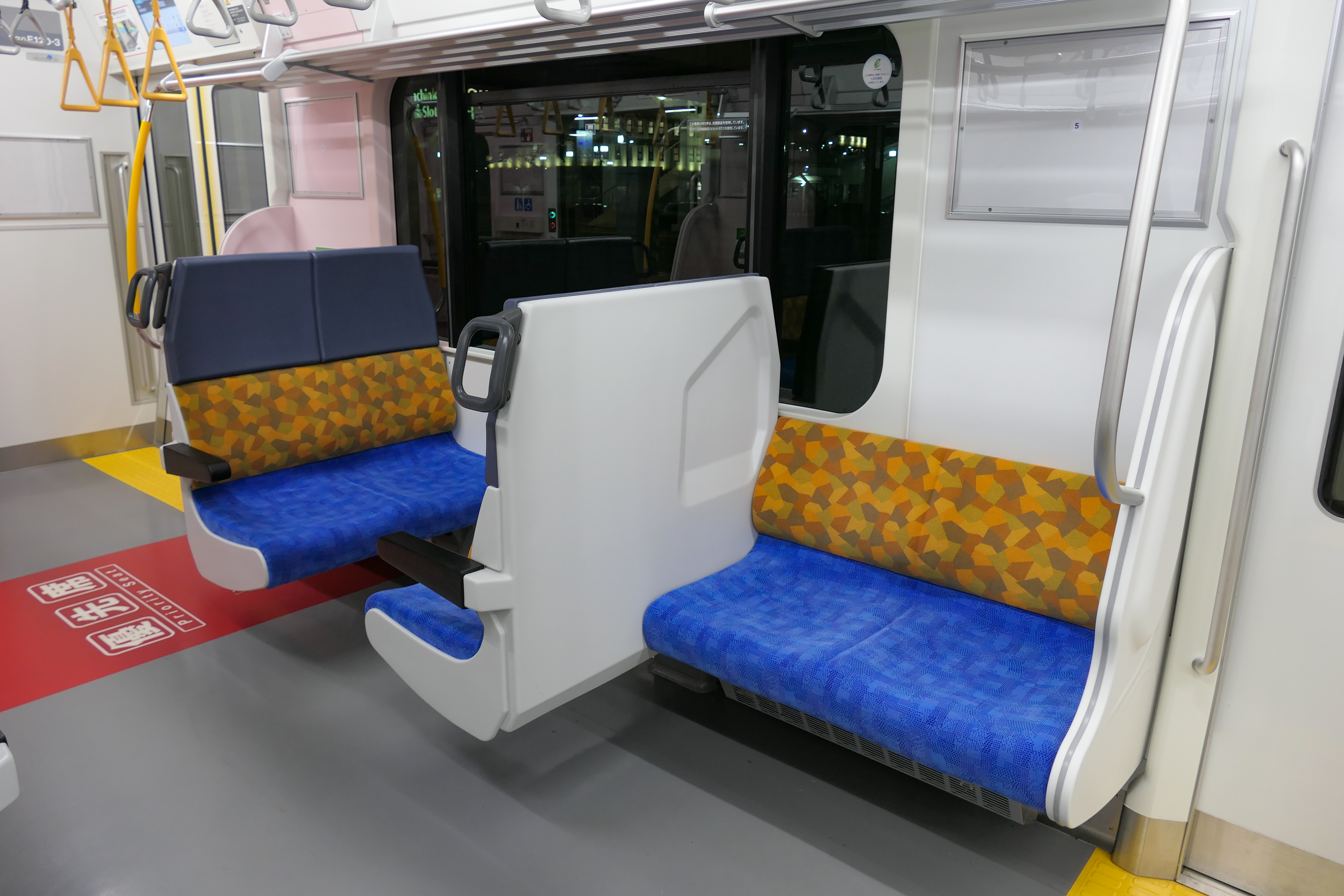
Mixed longitudinal and transverse seating

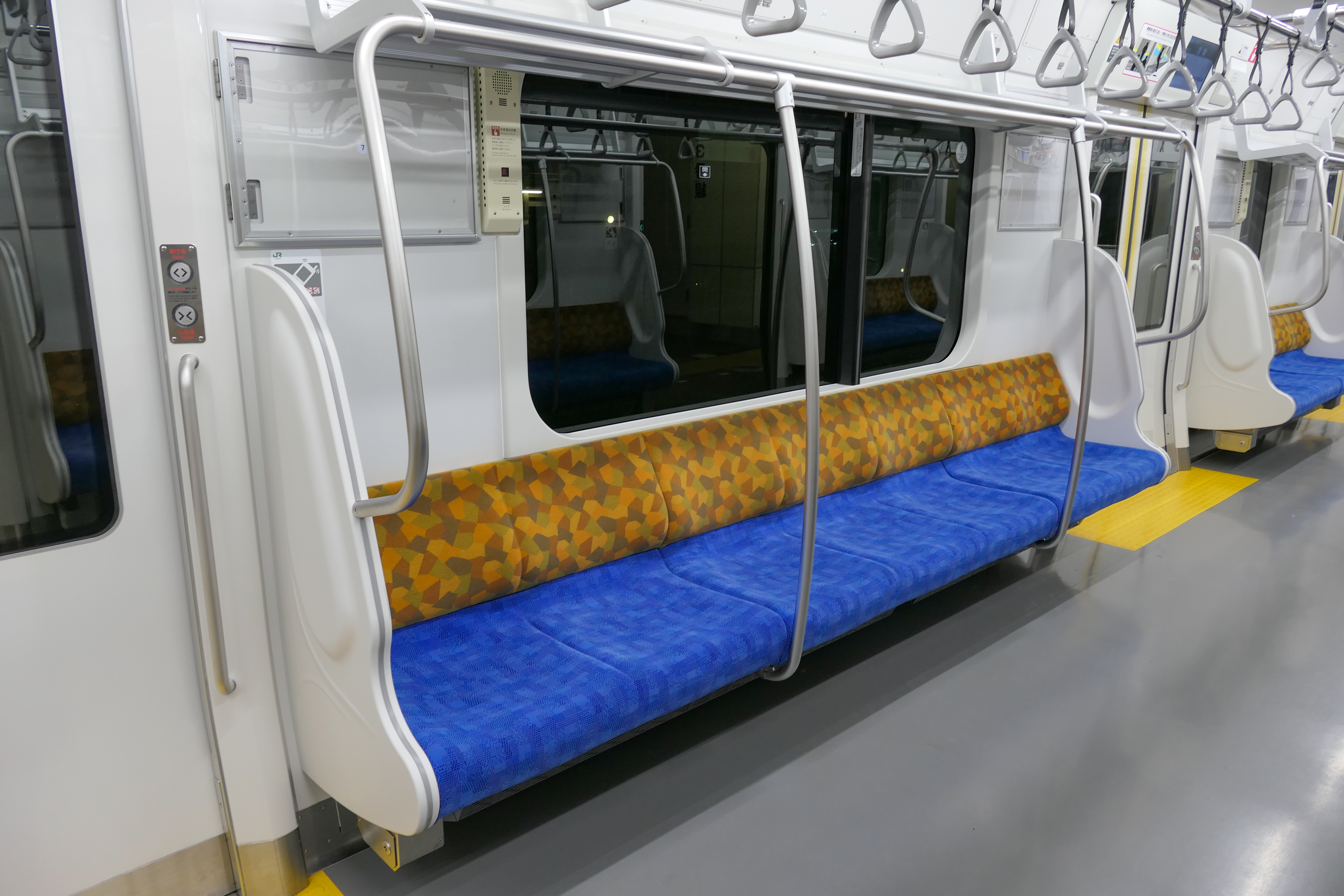
Longitudinal seating

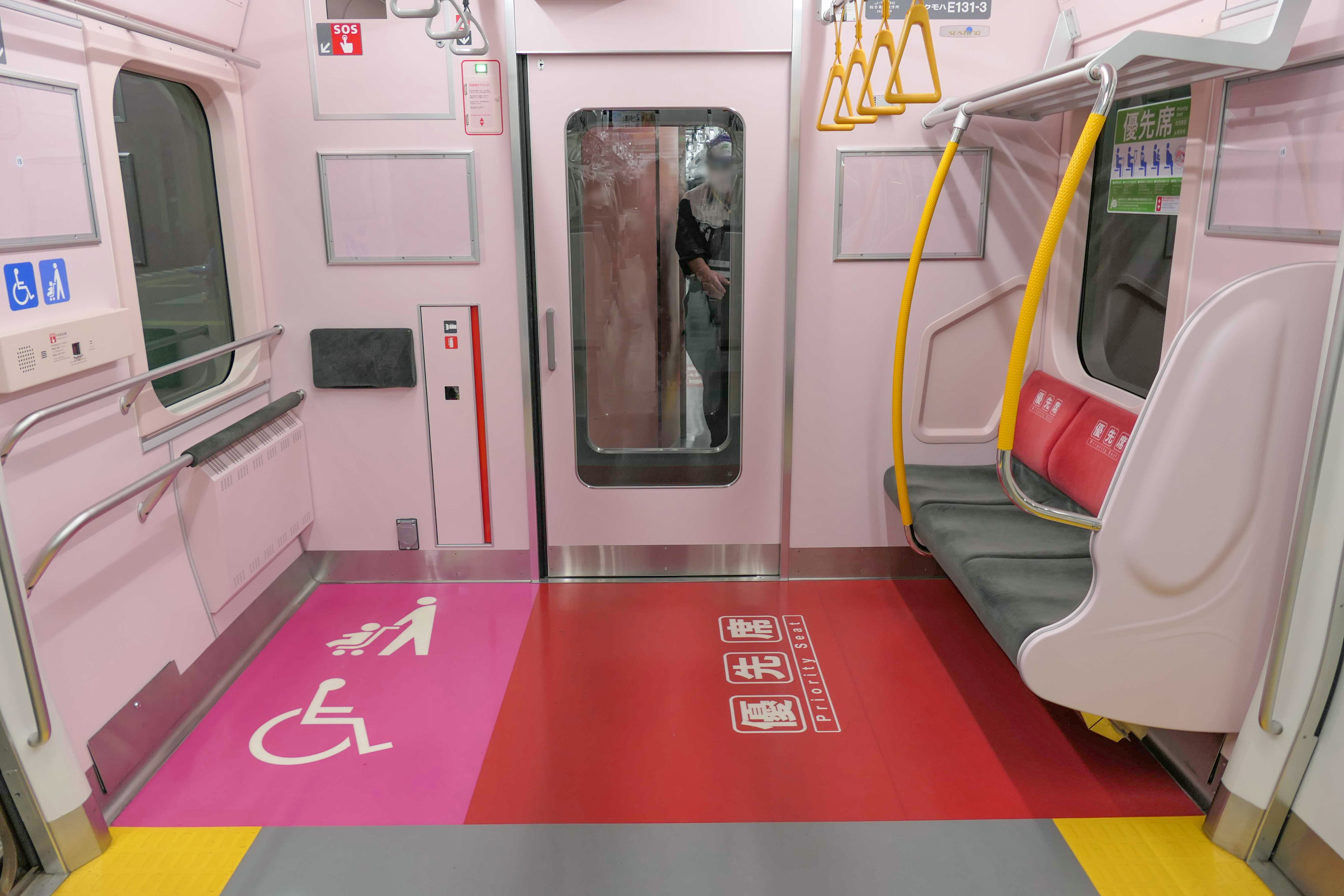
Priority seating with wheelchair/stroller space

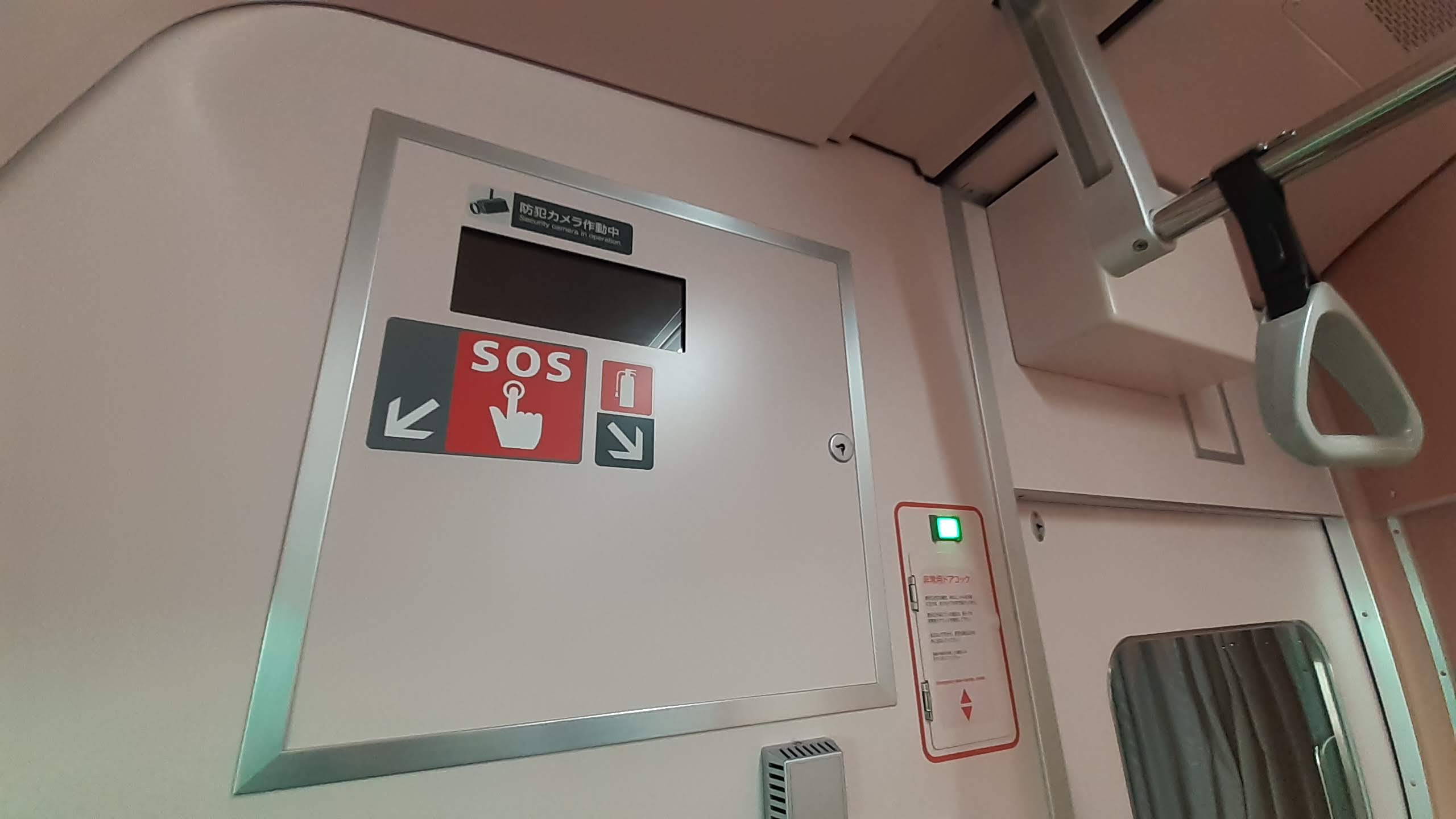
Onboard security cameras

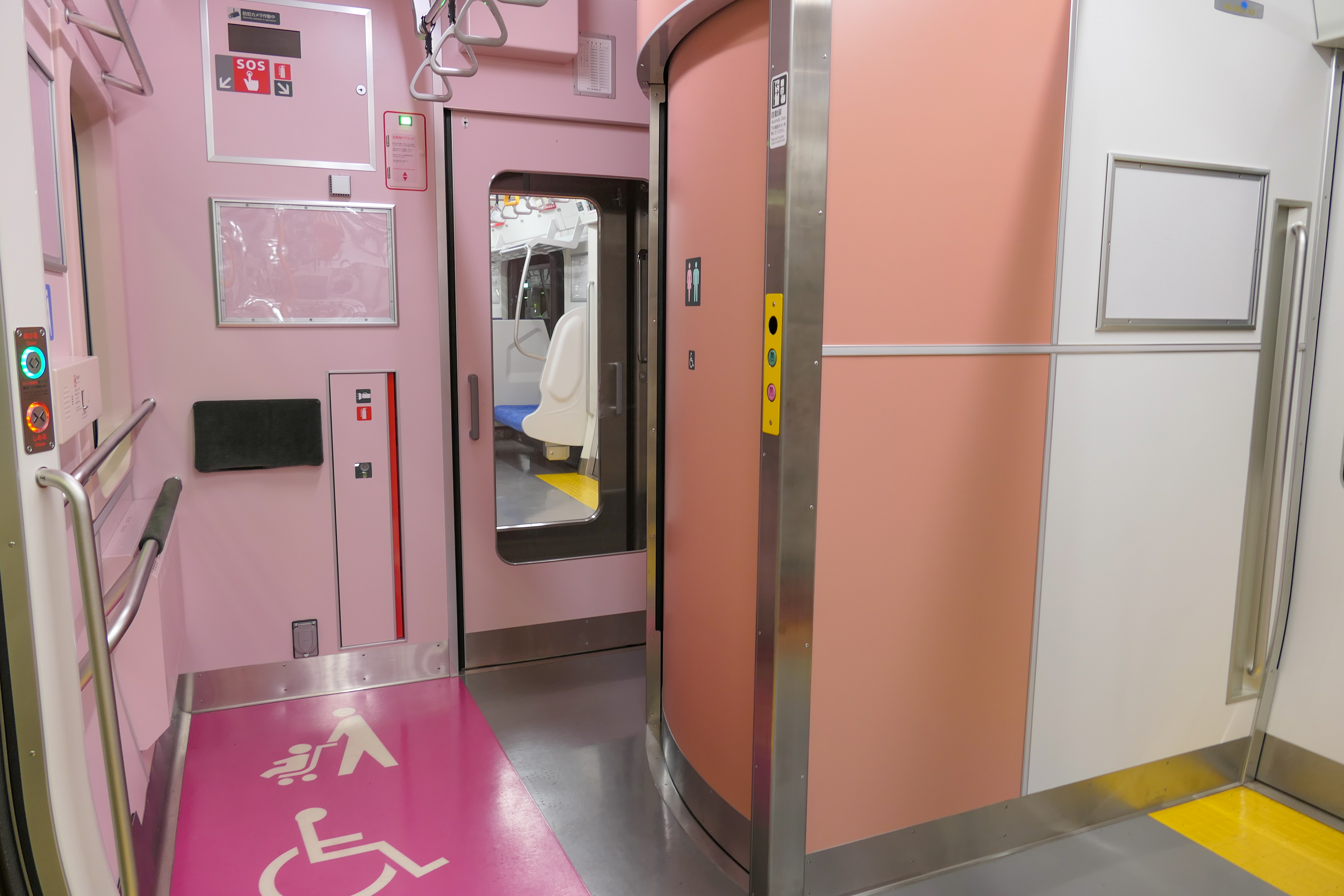
Onboard universal design toilet

=== Fleet details ===
The table below shows the details of each set.

Set No.	Delivery date	Leading car	Trailing car
R01	21 July 2020	KuMoHa E131-1	KuHa E130-1
R02	21 July 2020	KuMoHa E131-2	KuHa E130-2
R03	28 August 2020	KuMoHa E131-3	KuHa E130-3
R04	28 August 2020	KuMoHa E131-4	KuHa E130-4
R05	10 October 2020	KuMoHa E131-5	KuHa E130-5
R06	10 October 2020	KuMoHa E131-6	KuHa E130-6
R07	26 November 2020	KuMoHa E131-7	KuHa E130-7
R08	26 November 2020	KuMoHa E131-8	KuHa E130-8
R09	12 February 2021	KuMoHa E131-9	KuHa E130-9
R10	12 February 2021	KuMoHa E131-10	KuHa E130-10
R11	2 March 2021	KuMoHa E131-81	KuHa E130-81
R12	19 March 2021	KuMoHa E131-82	KuHa E130-82

- Sets R11 and R12 are fitted with track monitoring equipment.

== E131-200/-280 series ==
E131-200/-280 series
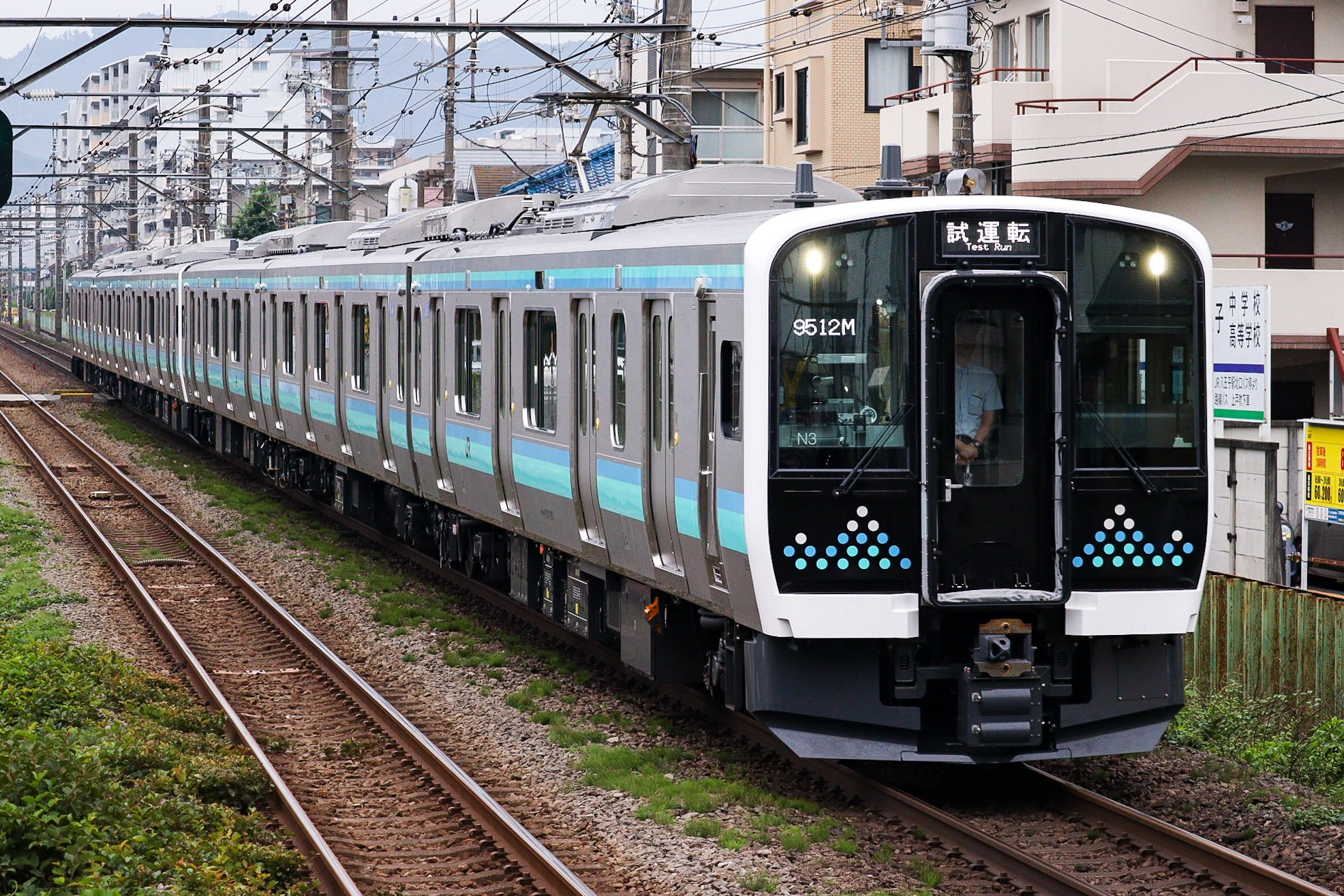
- E131-200 series set N3 test running in July 2026
- Stock type: Electric multiple unit
- In service: 2026–present
- Replaced: 211 series
- Constructed: 2026–present
- Entered service: 1 October 2026
- Number under construction: 12 vehicles (4 sets)
- Number built: 48 vehicles (16 sets)
- Number in service: 42 vehicles (14 sets)
- Formation: 3 cars per trainset
- Fleet numbers: N1– N20
- Lines served: Chūō Main Line; Shinonoi Line; Shin'etsu Main Line; Fujikyuko Line

Specifications
- Maximum speed: 110 km/h (68 mph)
- Traction system: Hitachi hybrid-SiC/IGBT–VVVF

Twenty 3-car sets are to be built to replace the ageing 211 series trains operated in the Nagano region from late 2026. Internally, the trains will be equipped with LED information displays instead of LCDs like previous E131 series variants. Unlike the outgoing trains, the E131-200 series trains are not planned to operate onto the JR Central network.

The first two sets, N1 and N2, were delivered from the J-TREC Niitsu plant in May 2026, followed by sets N3 and N4 later that month. The fleet first entered passenger service on 1 October 2026. Set N18 is equipped with track monitoring equipment.

=== Lines served ===
The series will serve the following sections of lines:

- Chūō Main Line: Takao – Shiojiri
- Shinonoi Line: Shiojiri – Shinonoi
- Shin'etsu Main Line: Shinonoi – Nagano
- Fujikyuko Line

=== Fleet details ===
The delivery dates for the fleet are as shown below.

Set No.	Date delivered
N1	May 2026
N2	May 2026
N3	May 2026
N4	May 2026
N5	June 2026
N6	June 2026
N7	June 2026
N8	June 2026
N9	July 2026
N10	July 2026
N11	July 2026
N12	July 2026
N13	September 2026
N14	September 2026
N15	October 2026
N18	October 2026

== E131-500/-580 series ==
E131-500/-580 series
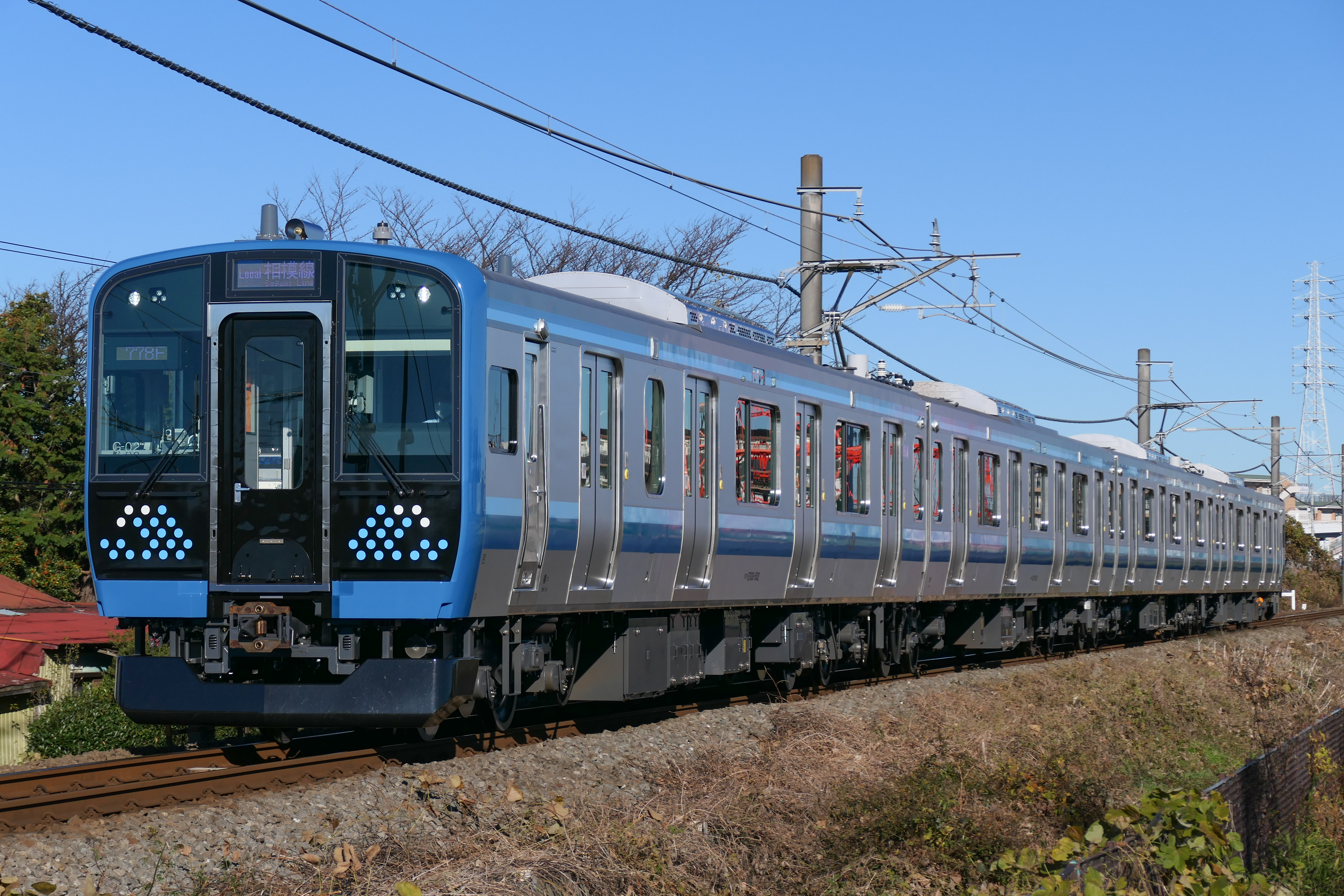
- Set G-02 in November 2021

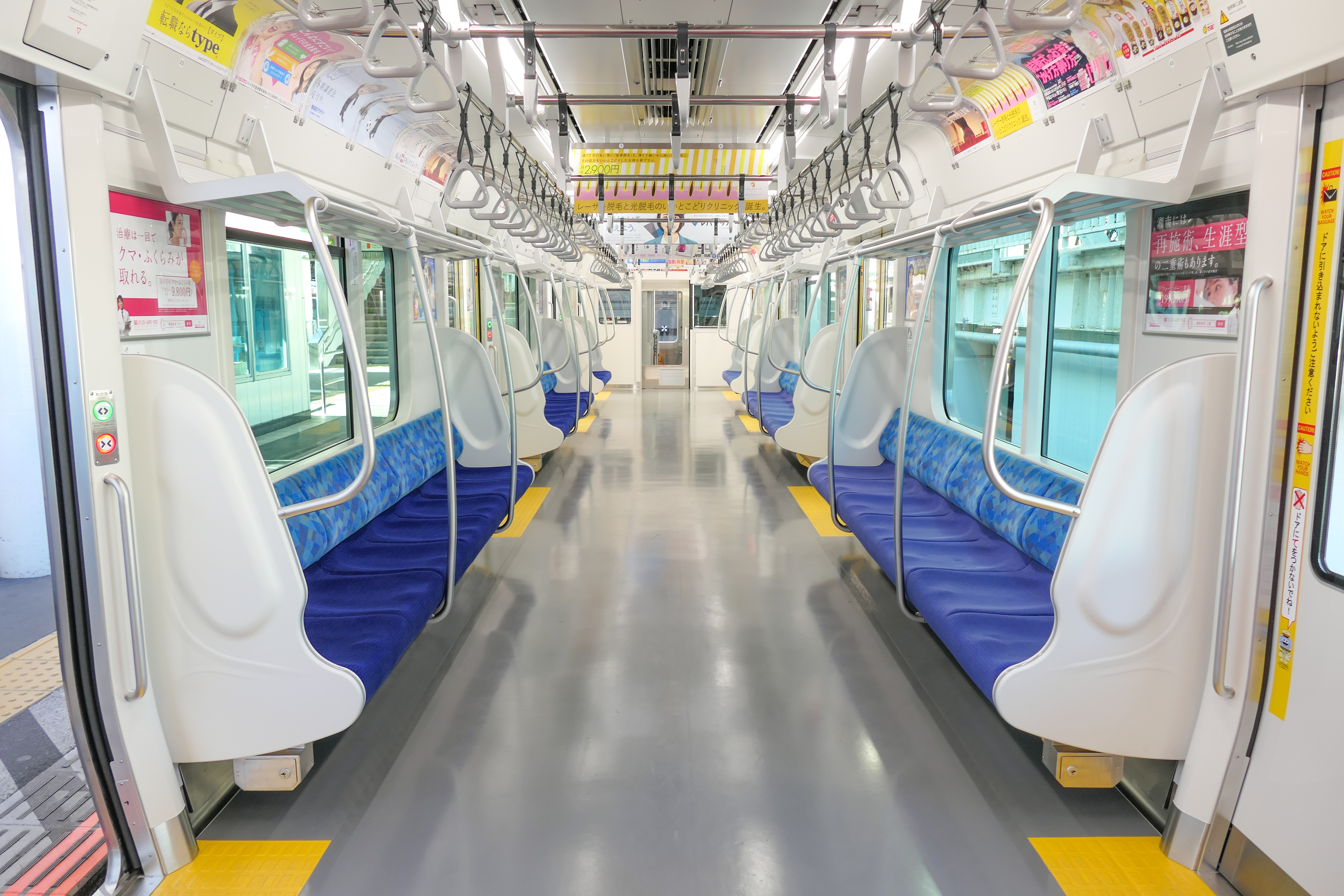
- Interior (November 2021)
- Replaced: 205-500 series
- Constructed: 2021–2022
- Entered service: 18 November 2021
- Number built: 48 vehicles (12 sets)
- Number in service: 48 vehicles (12 sets)
- Formation: 4 cars per trainset
- Fleet numbers: G-01 – G-12
- Depot: Kōzu
- Line served: ■ Sagami Line

Specifications
- Train length: 80 m (262 ft 6 in) (including couplers)
- Traction motors: 8 × 150 kW (201 hp)
- Power output: 1.2 MW (1,609 hp)
- UIC classification: Bo′Bo′+2′2′+Bo′Bo′+2′2′

A total of 12 four-car trains were built for the Sagami Line; the first set (G-01) entered service on 18 November 2021 and the last set (G-12) arrived on 25 January 2022. It replaced the existing 205-500 series trains that have been in service since 1991.

These trains were also used on through services between the Sagami Line and Yokohama Line during the morning and evening rush; these services ended on 11 March 2022.

=== Lines served ===
The series serves the following sections of lines:

- Sagami Line: Chigasaki – Hashimoto
- Yokohama Line: Hashimoto – Hachiōji (until 11 March 2022)

=== Formations ===
As of 26 January 2022, twelve four-car sets (G-01–G-12) are based at Kōzu Depot in Kanagawa Prefecture and formed with 2 motored ("M") cars and 2 trailer ("T") cars. Sets G-11 and G-12 are fitted with track monitoring equipment.

	← Hachiōji, Hashimoto Chigasaki →			
Car No.	4	3	2	1
Designation	Mc	T	M	Tc'
Numbering	KuMoHa E131-500/-580	SaHa E131-500	MoHa E130-500	KuHa E130-500/-580

- Cars 2 and 4 each have a single-arm pantograph.
- All cars have an accessible/priority "free space".
- Car 3 is designated as a mildly air-conditioned car.

=== Interior ===
Passenger accommodation consists of longitudinal seating throughout. Priority seating and wheelchair- and stroller-accessible "free spaces" are provided in each car.

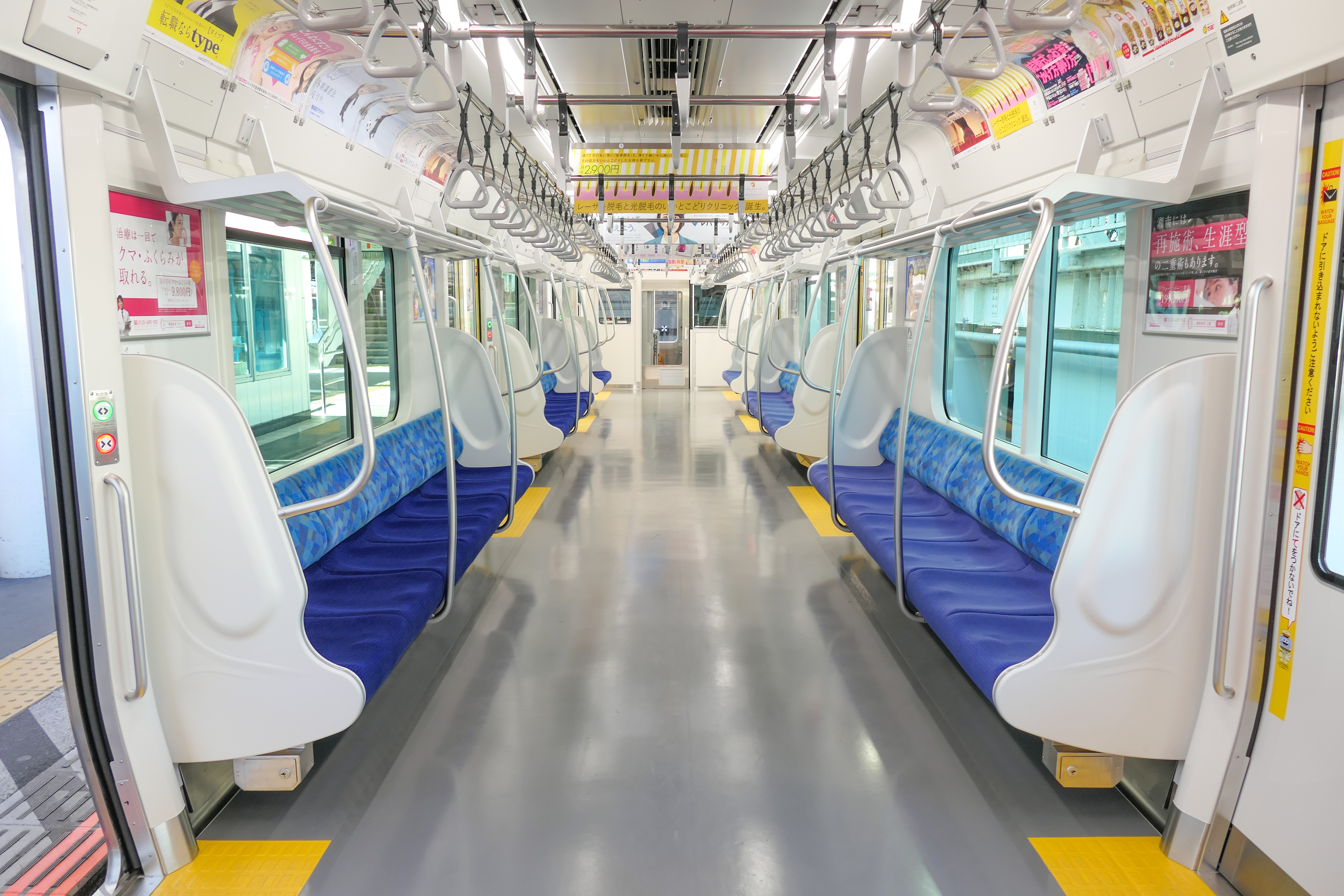
Interior view

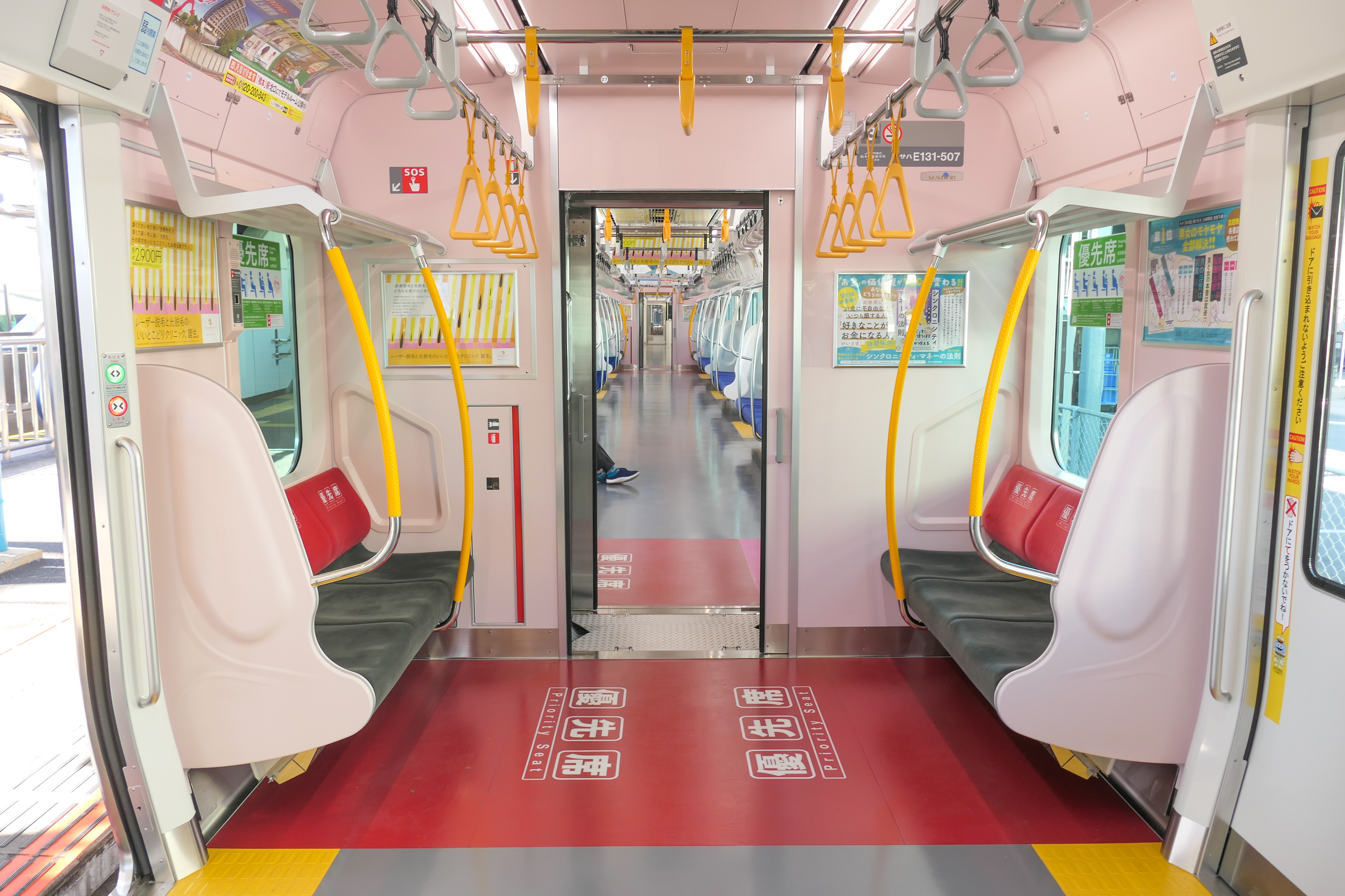
Priority seating

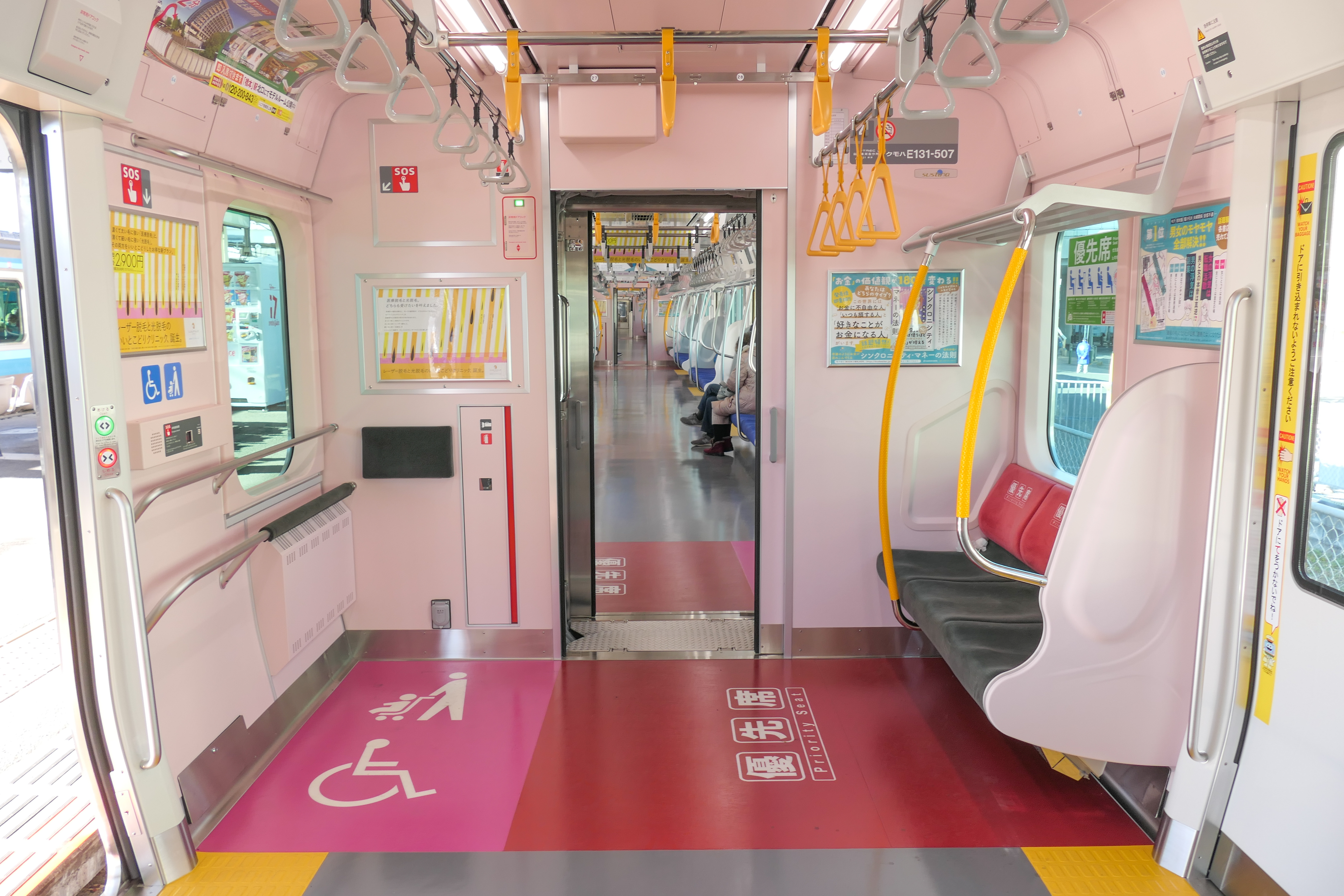
Priority seating with free space

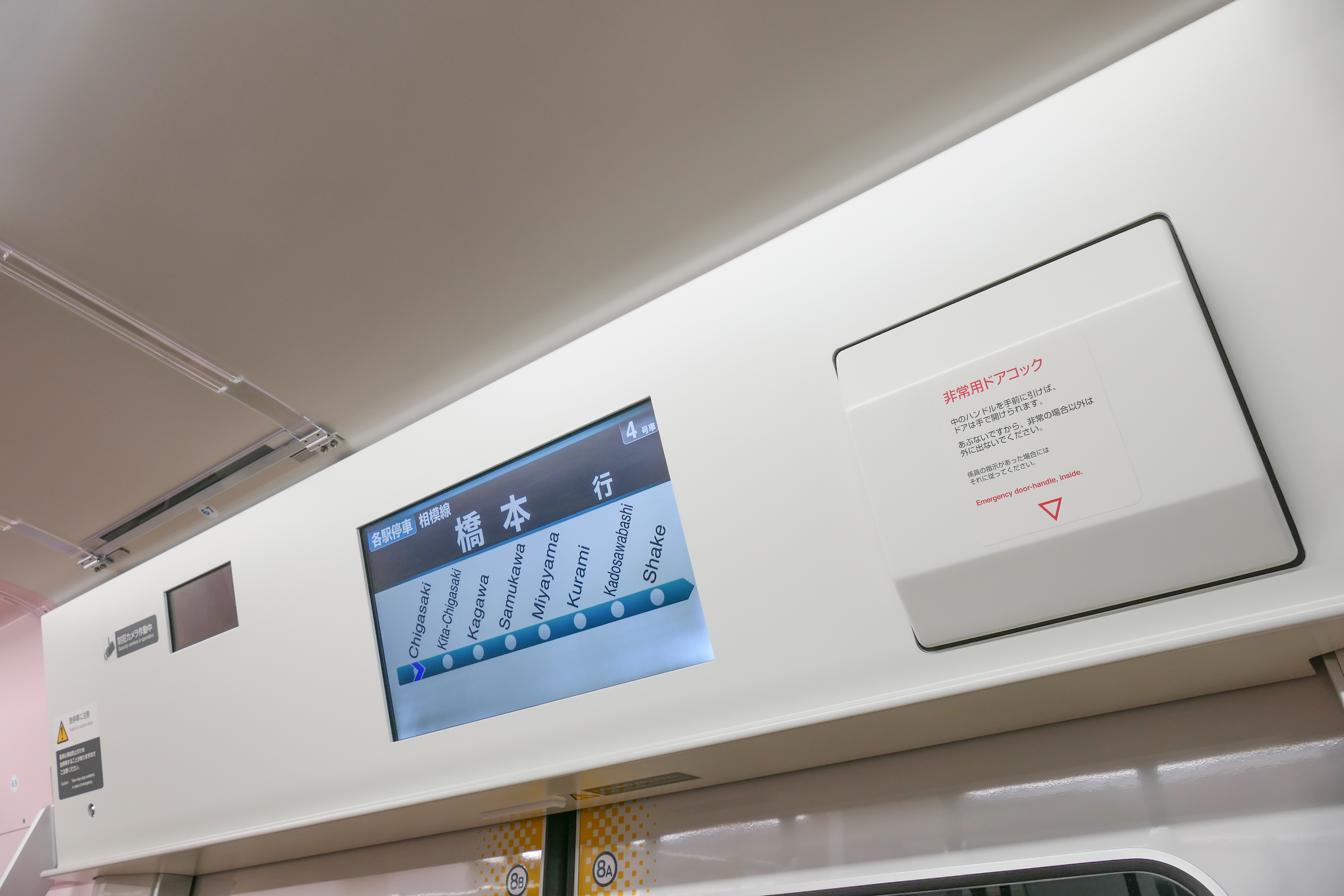
LCD passenger information display

== E131-600/-680 series ==
E131-600/-680 series
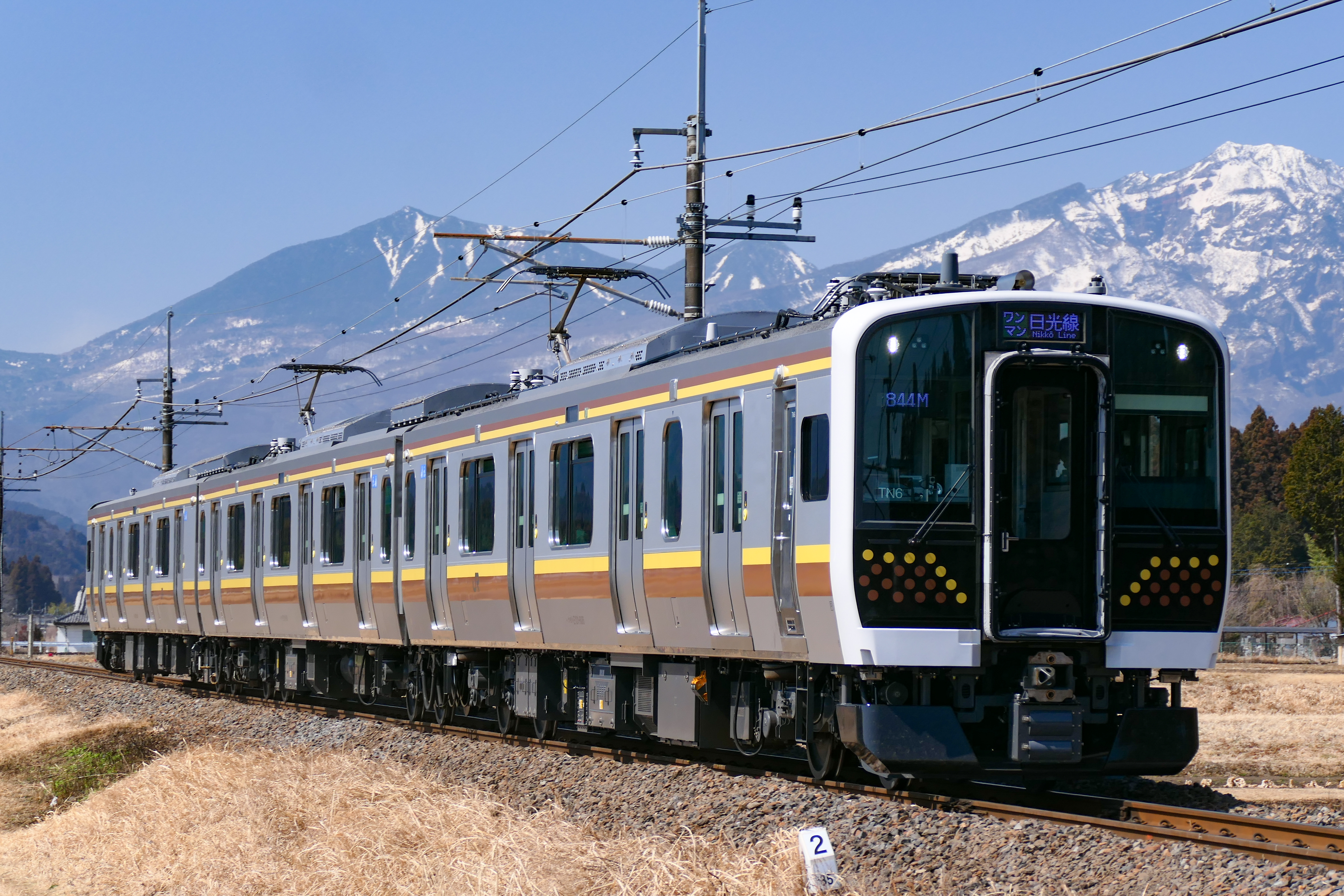
- E131-600 series set TN6 in March 2022

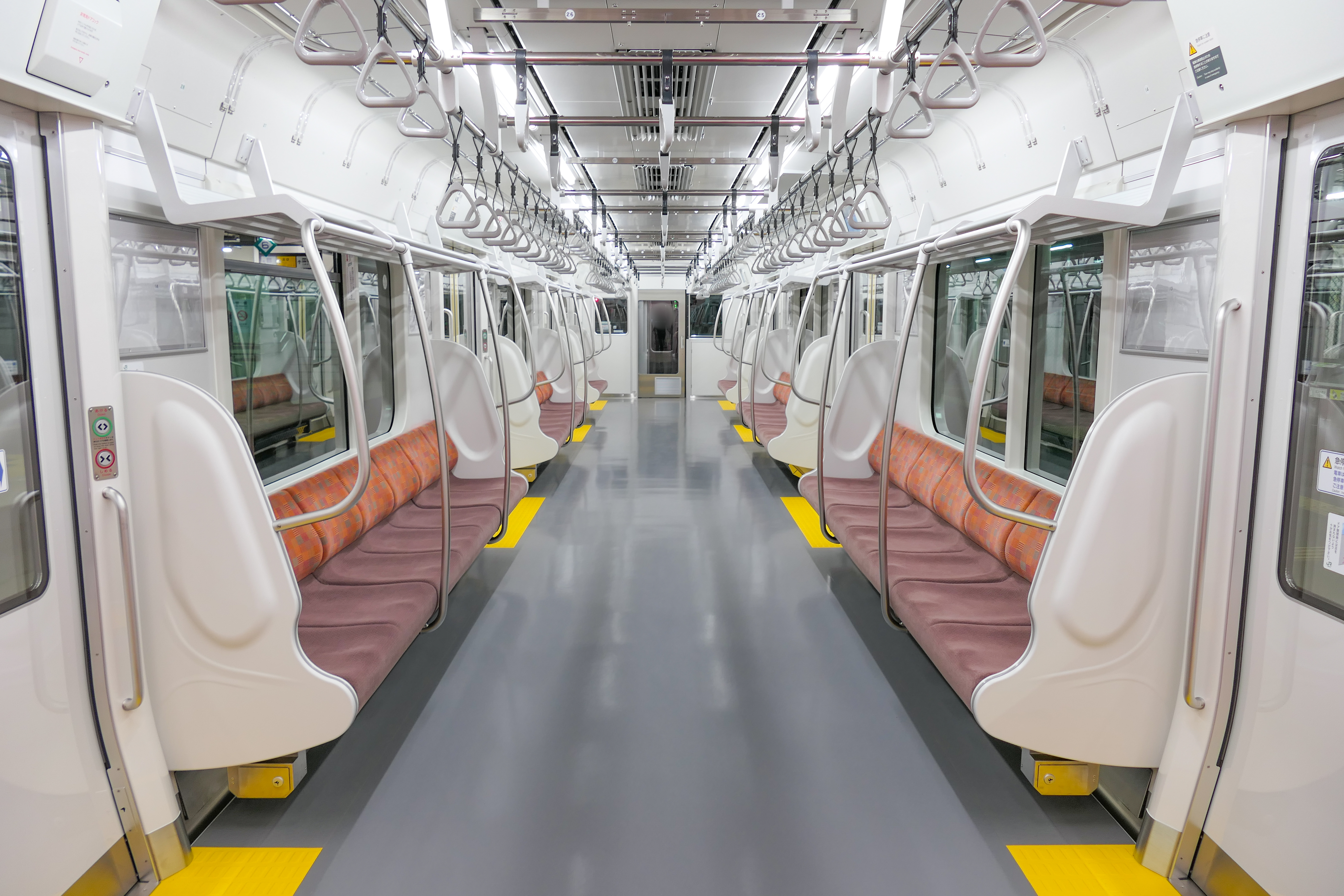
- Interior (March 2022)
- Replaced: 205-600 series
- Constructed: 2021–2022
- Entered service: 12 March 2022
- Number built: 45 vehicles (15 sets)
- Number in service: 45 vehicles (15 sets)
- Formation: 3 cars per trainset
- Fleet numbers: TN1–TN15
- Depot: Oyama
- Lines served: ■ Nikkō Line; Utsunomiya Line

Specifications
- Train length: 60 m (196 ft 10 in) (including couplers)
- Traction motors: 6 × 150 kW (201 hp)
- Power output: 900 kW (1,207 hp)
- UIC classification: Bo′Bo′+2′Bo′+2′2′

A total of 15 three-car trains were built for the Nikkō Line and Utsunomiya Line. The first fourteen sets (TN1–TN15) entered service on 12 March 2022, with TN1 and TN2 arriving on 11 August 2021 and the last one, TN15 arriving on 14 February 2022. It replaced the existing 205-600 series trains that have been in service since 2013.

=== Lines served ===
The series serves the following sections of lines:

- Nikkō Line: Utsunomiya – Nikkō
- Utsunomiya Line: Oyama – Kuroiso

=== Formations ===
As of 14 February 2022, 15 three-car sets (TN1–TN15) are based at Oyama Depot in Tochigi Prefecture and formed with 2 motored ("M") cars and 1 trailer ("T") car (the MoHa E131 car has one motorized bogie and one trailer bogie). Sets TN14 and TN15 are fitted with track monitoring equipment.

	← Kuroiso, Utsunomiya Nikkō, Oyama →		
Designation	Mc	M1	Tc'
Numbering	KuMoHa E131-600/-680	MoHa E131-600	KuHa E130-600/-680

- The KuMoHa E131 car has two single-arm pantographs, while the MoHa E131 car has one.
- All cars have an accessible/priority "free space".
- The KuHa E130 car has a universal design toilet.

== E131-800/-880 series ==
E131-800/-880 series
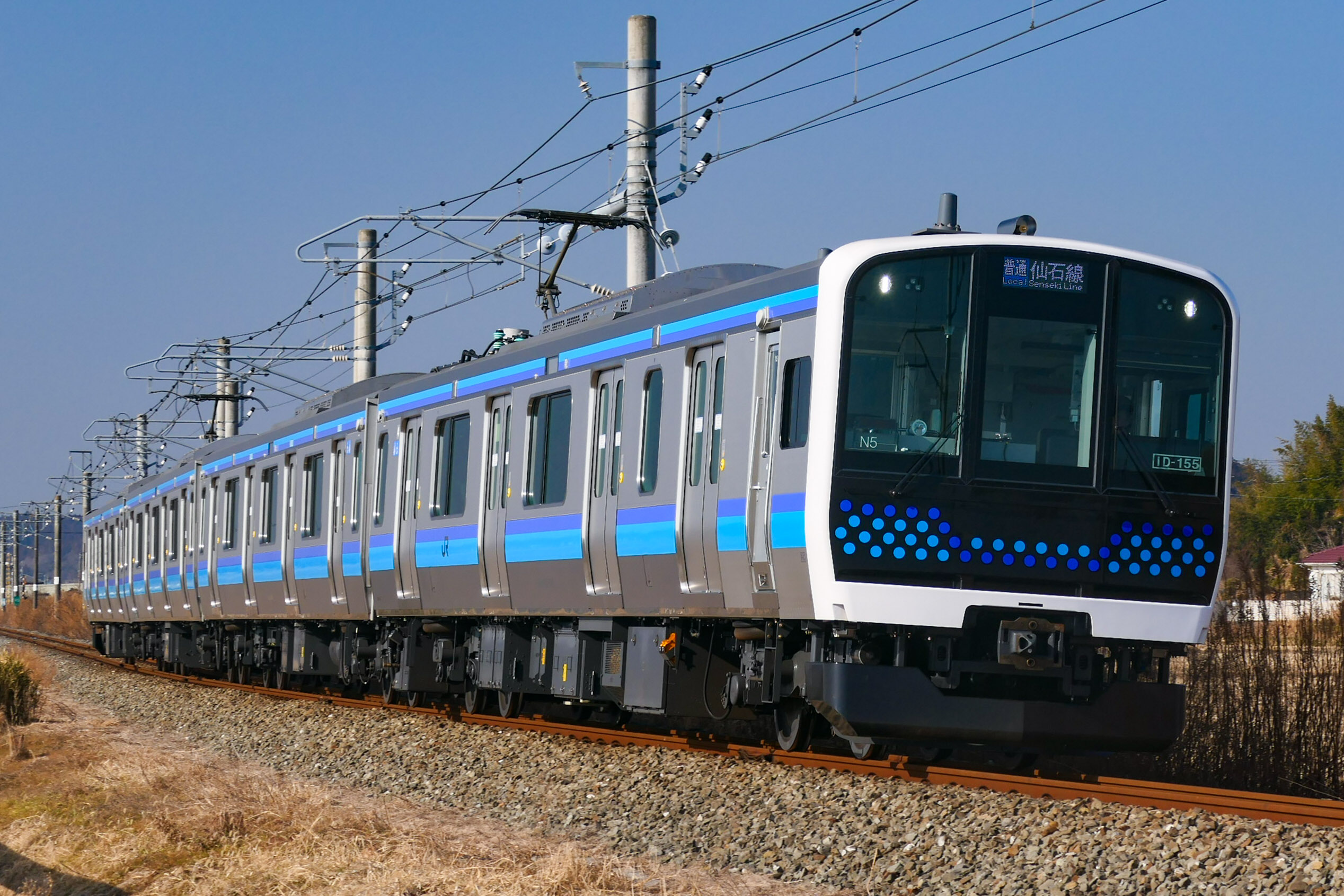
- E131-800 series set N5 in February 2026

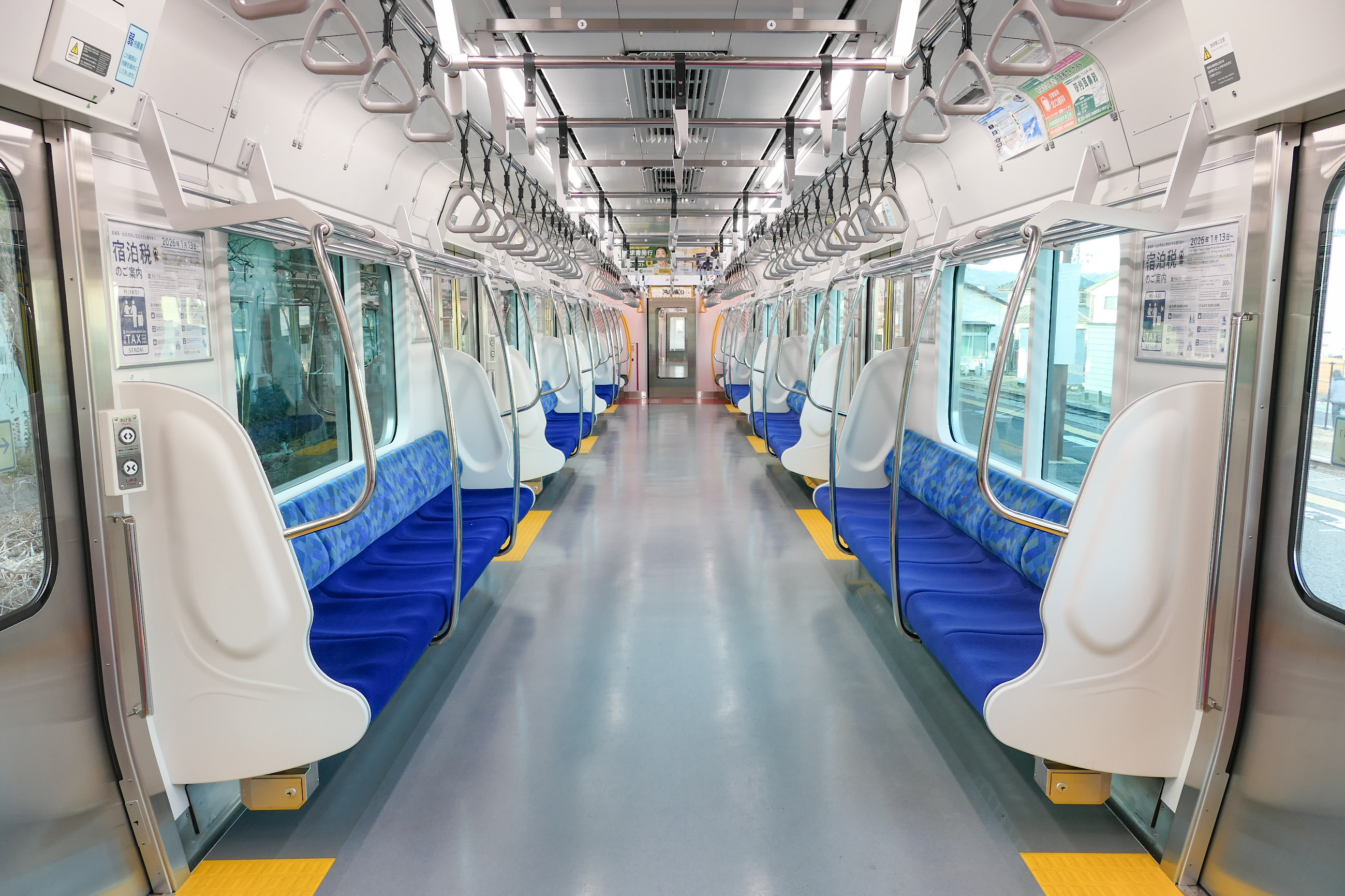
- Interior (February 2026)
- Replaced: 205-3100 series
- Constructed: 2025–2026
- Entered service: 1 December 2025
- Number built: 56 vehicles (14 sets)
- Number in service: 56 vehicles (14 sets)
- Formation: 4 cars per trainset
- Fleet numbers: N1–N14
- Depot: Miyagino
- Line served: ■ Senseki Line

14 four-car sets were built to replace the 205-3100 series fleet on the Senseki Line. Classified as the E131-800 series, the first of these sets entered revenue service on 1 December 2025.

The first set, N1, was delivered on 11 April 2025.

The last set, N14, was delivered in February 2026. This set and set N13 feature monitoring equipment.

== E131-1000/-1080 series ==
E131-1000/-1080 series
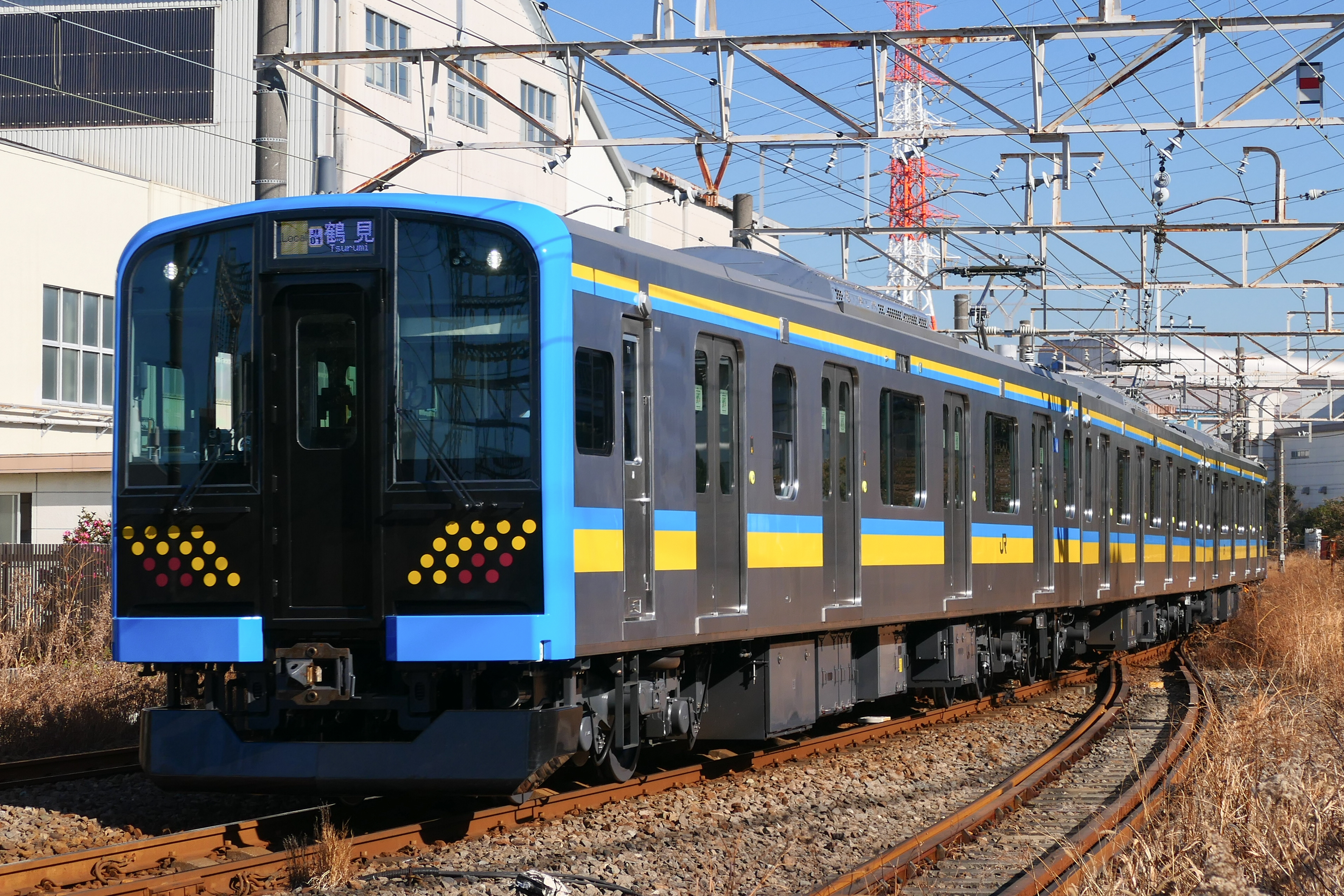
- E131-1000 series set T1 in January 2024

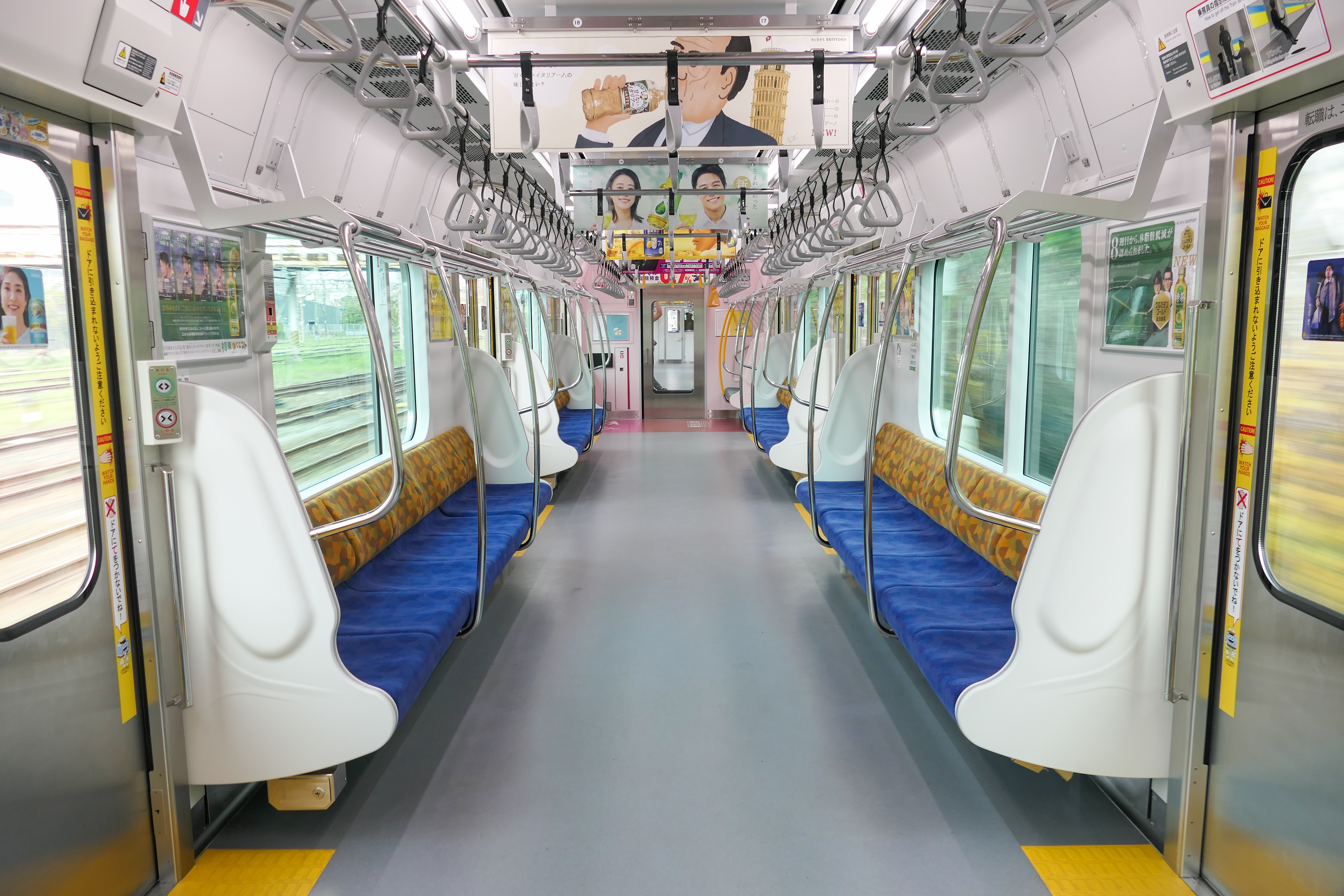
- Interior (April 2024)
- Replaced: 205-1100 series
- Constructed: 2023
- Entered service: 24 December 2023
- Number built: 24 vehicles (8 sets)
- Formation: 3 cars per trainset
- Fleet numbers: T1–T8
- Line served: Tsurumi Line

Specifications
- Width: 2,778 mm (9 ft 1 in)
- Maximum speed: 100 km/h (62 mph)

JR East announced in July 2023 that it would introduce eight 3-car E131-1000 series sets on the Tsurumi Line to replace the aging 205 series fleet. Unlike other E131 series variants, these sets use straight-sided bodywork with a width of 2,778 mm (9 ft 1 in), as opposed to 2,950 mm (9 ft 8 in) with previous sets. They entered service on 24 December 2023.

The first two sets, T1 and T2, were built at J-TREC's Niitsu plant and commissioned from October 2023. The last set, T8, was commissioned in December 2023. This set uniquely features track monitoring equipment.

== Second Chiba Prefecture variant ==
In September 2026, JR East announced that it would introduce 3- and 6-car E131 series trainsets from 2027 for use on Sōbu Main Line, Narita Line, Uchibō Line, Sotobō Line, and Tōgane Line services in Chiba Prefecture. Unlike the E131-0 series also operated in the region, these trains will be internally equipped with longitudinal seating throughout as well as LED passenger information displays.
