= Shisui Station =

Railway station in Shisui, Chiba Prefecture, Japan

JO34 Shisui Station 酒々井駅
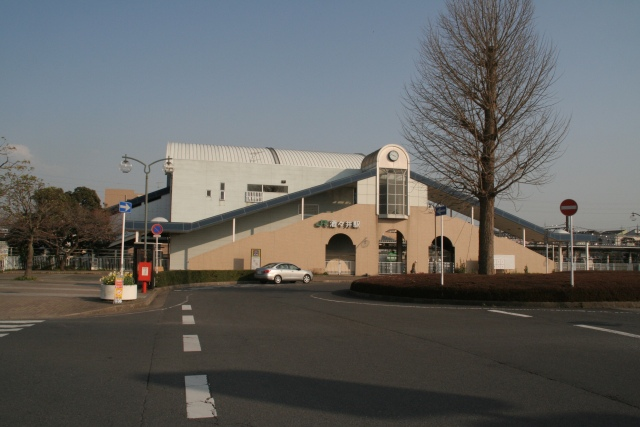
- Shisui Station

General information
- Location: Shisui 921, Shisui-machi, Inba-gun, Chiba-ken 285-0927; Japan
- Coordinates: 35°43′54.33″N 140°16′31.21″E
- Operator: JR East
- Line: ■ Narita Line
- Distance: 6.4 km from Sakura
- Platforms: 2 side platforms

Other information
- Status: Staffed (Midori no Madoguchi)
- Website: Official website

History
- Opened: January 19, 1897

Passengers
- FY2019: 3689

Services
Preceding station	JR East	Following station
Sakura JO33 towards Chiba	Narita Line Rapid	Narita JO35 towards Narita Airport Terminal 1
Sakura JO33 towards Chiba	Narita Line Local	Narita JO35 towards Chōshi, Abiko or Narita Airport Terminal 1
Location
- Location within Chiba Prefecture Location within Japan

Shisui Station (酒々井駅, Shisui-eki) is a passenger railway station in the town of Shisui, Chiba Prefecture, Japan, operated by the East Japan Railway Company (JR East).

== Lines ==
Shisui Station is served by the Narita Line, and is located 6.4 kilometers from the terminus of line at Sakura Station.

== Station layout ==
Shisui Station consists of dual opposed side platforms connected to the station building by a footbridge. The station has a Midori no Madoguchi staffed ticket office.

=== Platforms ===
1	■ Narita Line	for Narita, Narita Airport (Terminal 2·3 and Terminal 1), Sawara and Chōshi
2	■ Narita Line	for Sakura, Chiba and Tokyo

== History ==
Shisui Station was opened on January 19, 1897, as a station on the Narita Railway Company for both freight and passenger operations. The Narita Railway was nationalized on September 1, 1920, becoming part of the Japanese Government Railway (JGR). After World War II, the JGR became the Japan National Railways (JNR). Scheduled freight operations were suspended from November 1, 1961. The station has been unattended since March 15, 1974. The station was absorbed into the JR East network upon the privatization of the Japan National Railways (JNR) on April 1, 1987. A new station building was completed in 1989, allowing the station to be once again staffed.

== Passenger statistics ==
In fiscal 2019, the station was used by an average of 3689 passengers daily (boarding passengers only).

== Surrounding area ==
- Shisui Town Hall
- Shisui Municipal Shisui Junior High School
- Shisui Municipal Omurodai Elementary School

== See also ==
- List of railway stations in Japan
