= Monoi Station =

Railway station in Yotsukaidō, Chiba Prefecture, Japan

JO32 Monoi Station 物井駅
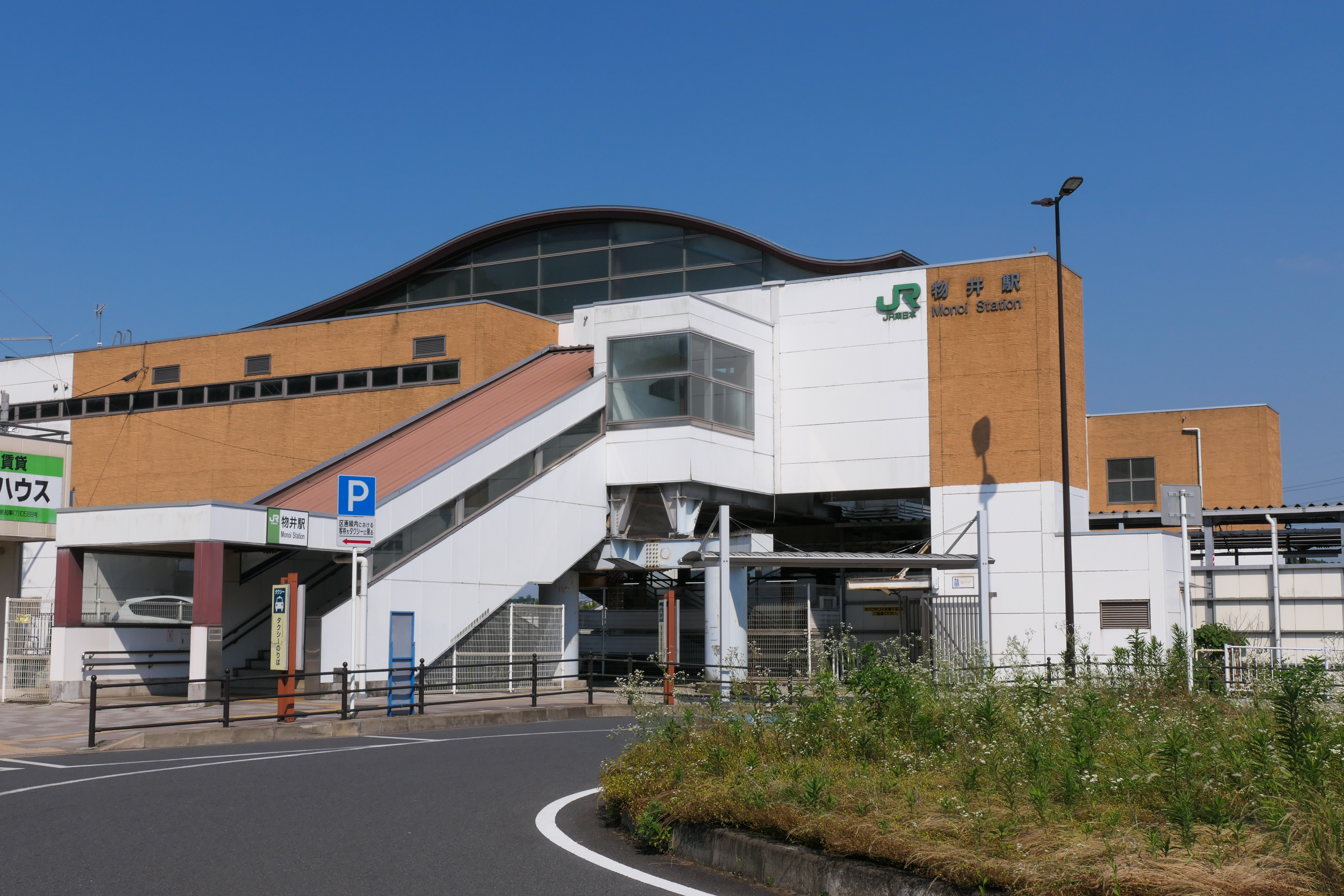
- Station building

General information
- Location: 428 Monoi, Yotsukaidō-shi, Chiba-ken 284-0012; Japan
- Coordinates: 35°41′8.33″N 140°12′1.35″E
- Operator: JR East
- Line: ■ Sōbu Main Line
- Distance: 51.1 km from Tokyo
- Platforms: 2 side platforms

Other information
- Status: Staffed
- Station code: JO32
- Website: Official website

History
- Opened: April 5, 1937

Passengers
- FY2019: 4163

Services
Preceding station	JR East	Following station
Yotsukaidō JO31 towards Chiba	Sōbu Main / Narita lines Rapid	Sakura JO33 towards Narita Airport Terminal 1
Yotsukaidō JO31 towards Chiba	Sōbu Main / Narita lines Local	Sakura JO33 towards Chōshi, Abiko or Narita Airport Terminal 1
Location
- Location within Chiba Prefecture Location within Japan

Monoi Station (物井駅, Monoi-eki) is a passenger railway station in the city of Yotsukaidō, Chiba Prefecture, Japan, operated by the East Japan Railway Company (JR East).

== Lines ==
Monoi Station is served by the Sōbu Main Line between Tokyo and Chōshi, and is located 51.1 kilometers from the western terminus of the Sōbu Main Line at Tokyo Station.

== Station layout ==
The station consists of two opposed side platforms connected to the station building by a footbridge. The station is staffed.

=== Platforms ===
1	■ Sōbu Main Line	for Sakura, Narutō and Chōshi
1	■ Narita Line	for Sakura, Narita, Narita Airport (Terminal 2·3 and Terminal 1) and Chōshi
2	■ Sōbu Main Line	for Chiba and Tokyo

== History ==
Monoi Station originated as the Monoi Signal (物井信号所) on the Japanese Government Railway (JGR), established on March 4, 1911. It was upgraded to the Monoi Signal Stop (物井信号場) on April 1, 1922, and to a full passenger station on April 5, 1937. After World War II, the JGR became the Japan National Railways (JNR). The station was absorbed into the JR East network upon the privatization of the Japan National Railways (JNR) on April 1, 1987. A new elevated station building was completed on April 12, 1998. The platforms were lengthened in 2004 to accommodate 15-carriage trains.

== Passenger statistics ==
In fiscal 2009, the station was used by an average of 4163 passengers daily.

== Surrounding area ==
- Sakura Industrial Estate
- Keiai University

== See also ==
- List of railway stations in Japan
