= Sakura Station (Chiba) =

Railway station in Sakura, Chiba Prefecture, Japan

JO33 Sakura Station 佐倉駅
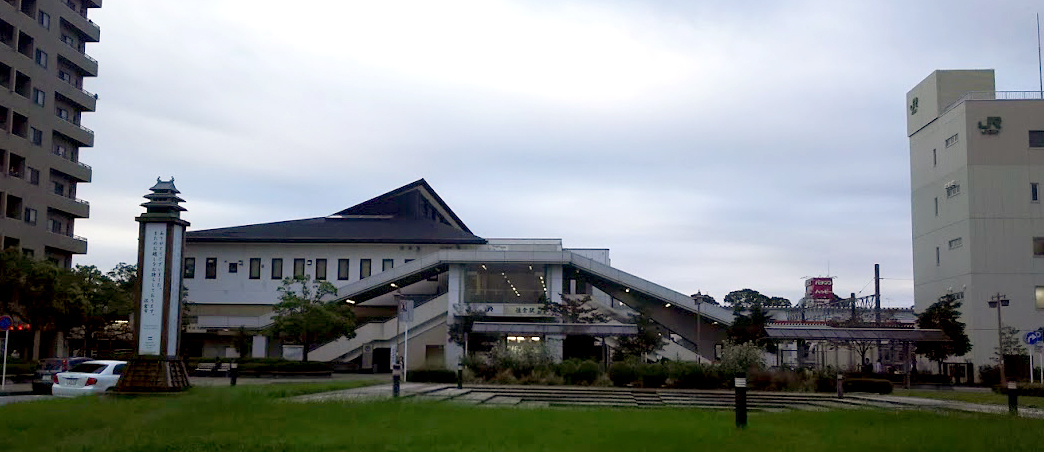
- Sakura Station South entrance, October 2016

General information
- Location: 235-2 Mutsuzaki, Sakura-shi, Chiba-ken 285-0812; Japan
- Coordinates: 35°42′35.02″N 140°13′33.77″E
- Operator: JR East
- Lines: ■ Narita Line; ■ Sōbu Main Line
- Distance: 55.3 km from Tokyo
- Platforms: 2 island platforms

Other information
- Status: Staffed ( Midori no Madoguchi )
- Station code: JO33
- Website: Official website

History
- Opened: July 20, 1894

Passengers
- FY2019: 10,098 daily

Services
Preceding station	JR East	Following station
Yotsukaidō JO31 (rush periods) towards Shinjuku or Ōfuna	Narita Express (rush periods)	Narita JO35 (rush periods) towards Narita Airport Terminal 1
Yotsukaidō JO31 (limited service) towards Tokyo	Shiosai	Yachimata towards Chōshi
Monoi JO32 towards Chiba	Sōbu Main Line Rapid	Yachimata One-way operation
Monoi JO32 towards Chiba	Narita Line Rapid	Shisui JO34 towards Narita Airport Terminal 1
Monoi JO32 towards Chiba	Sōbu Main Line Local	Minami-Shisui towards Chōshi
Monoi JO32 towards Chiba	Narita Line Local	Shisui JO34 towards Chōshi, Abiko or Narita Airport Terminal 1
Location
- Location within Chiba Prefecture Location within Japan

Sakura Station (佐倉駅, Sakura-eki) is a junction passenger railway station in the city of Sakura, Chiba Prefecture, Japan, operated by the East Japan Railway Company (JR East).

== Lines ==
Sakura Station is served by the Sōbu Main Line and is 55.3 kilometers from the terminus of the line at Tokyo Station. It is also a terminus of the Narita Line and is 120.5 kilometers from the opposing terminus of the line at Chōshi Station.

== Station layout ==
The station is an elevated station, built over two island platforms. The station has a Midori no Madoguchi staffed ticket office.

=== Platforms ===
1	■ Sōbu Main Line	for Yachimata, Narutō, Yōkaichiba, and Chōshi
2	■ Narita Line	for Narita, Narita Airport (Terminal 2·3 and Terminal 1), Sawara, and Kashima-Jingū
3-4	■ Sōbu Main Line	for Chiba; Sōbu Line (Rapid) for Funabashi and Tokyo

== History ==
Sakura Station was opened on July 20, 1894 as a terminal station on the Sōbu Railway Company. A new station building was completed in December 1985. The station was absorbed into the JR East network upon the privatization of the Japanese National Railways (JNR) on April 1, 1987.

== Passenger statistics ==
In fiscal 2019, the station was used by an average of 10,098 passengers daily (boarding passengers only).

== Surrounding area ==
- Chiba Sakura Police Station
- Chiba Inba Government Building

== See also ==
- List of railway stations in Japan
