= 2021 Atami landslide =

Disaster in Atami, Shizuoka Prefecture, Japan on 3 July 2021

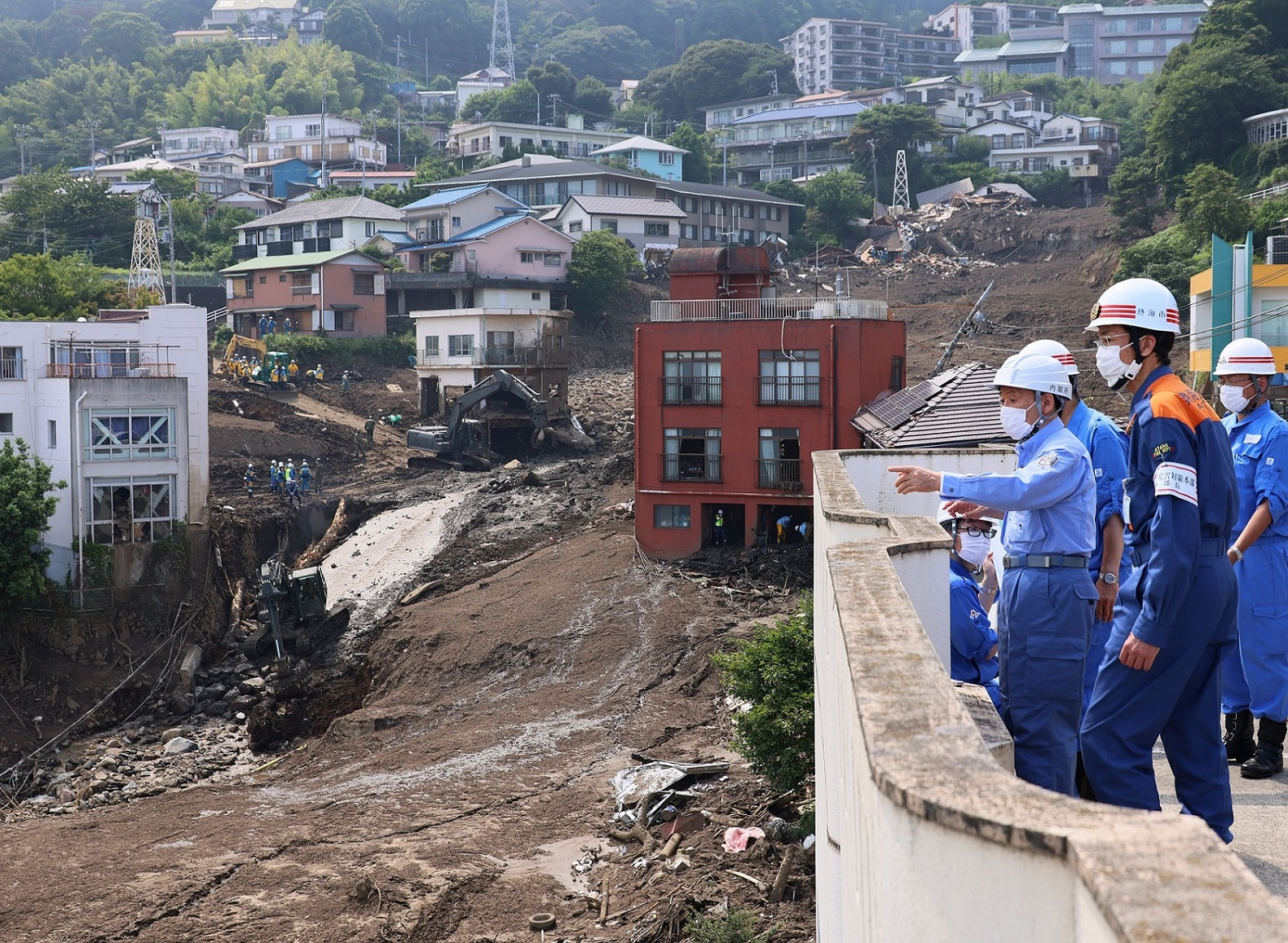
- Prime Minister Yoshihide Suga overlooks the damaged area; staining on the white building near the centre gives an impression of the height of the landslide during the incident.
- Date: 3 July 2021
- Time: 10:30 a.m. (JST)
- Location: Atami, Shizuoka Prefecture, Japan
- Cause: Heavy rainfall
- Deaths: 28

The Atami landslide was a natural disaster which hit the city of Atami on 3 July 2021. It was caused by heavy rainfall which resulted in significant damage to the community of Atami in Japan. The debris flow by the landslide resulted in life lost, infrastructure damage and had various health consequences. It was argued that the landslide could have been prevented or better managed by local authorities. The role of climate change is evident especially in a country like Japan that experiences heavy rainfall. Better management of land use as well as disaster preparedness are critical to prevent and better manage future landslides in Japan.

Atami Landslide video

== Background ==
In 2021, there were an estimated 972 landslide disasters in Japan. Prior to the Atami landslide there had been very heavy rainfall from 30 June 2021 with flash floods. The city received a total of 432.5mm of rainfall over the four days prior to 3 July 2021, exceeding the average monthly rainfall of 243mm.

It has been discovered that there was illegal landfill management within the area of Aizomegawa River. A soil mound of over 50m high, that exceeded the permitted size regulations, triggered the landslide due to the excessive rain. Debris flow destroyed and damaged many houses and buildings. Despite issuing an emergency security order, evacuations were not completed swiftly.

There were indications highlighting the possibility of a landslide occurring in the preceding months due to the rainfall patterns and early warning systems. These signs could have been used to evacuate citizens early, specifically the elderly and vulnerable. An additional learning outcome from this event is that landfill sites need to be monitored and investigated to ensure compliance with local guidelines, and prompt action is required from the community and local authorities if non-compliant.

== Location ==
Atami is a pacific coastal city, located 68 miles south west of Tokyo, Japan, in the eastern most tip of the Shizuoka Prefecture and northeast of the Izu Peninsula. It has a total population of 34,280 people and more than 50% of Atami's population is over 60 years old within the area of 61.78 km^{2}, according to the 2020 census.

Atami, Japan

Atami is originally known for its hot springs and now attracts tourists with the addition of museums exhibiting Japanese culture and vast variety of ocean water sports. Atami also boasts the Atami Castle, which is one of Japan's newest castles built in 1959. It is based on, and has features of, historic castles but was actually built for its panoramic views and used as a tourist facility.

Japan has extreme wet seasons which last approximately 7.2 months from March to October. The typhoon season is usually between July and October. In Atami, within this period, there is a 32% chance of precipitation, each day. June has been highlighted as the most wet month with an average of 13.3 days having rainfall. However, September has the most rain on average at 260.6mm.

== Precipitating factors ==
Landslides generally result from a combination of decrease in the shear strength and increase in shear stress of slope materials. In the case of the Atami landslide, three factors predominantly contributed to these phenomena- natural factors, human and administrative factors.

=== Natural factors ===
Atami City is formed mainly by hills, and most of the houses and the cottages rest on steep slopes. Three days leading up to the landslide, the region experienced a maximum periodic rainfall of 449 mm with a maximum 24-hour rainfall of 260 mm. This prolonged and intense level of rainfall was unseen in previous years. Heavy rainfall combined with the geographic characteristics may have affected slope stability and played an important role in triggering the landslide.

=== Human factors ===
The soil along the Atami debris flow path is composed predominantly of lava and pyroclastic fall deposits from the Hakone Volcano, which may have theoretically made this region susceptible to landslides. However, there was also a landfill formed at the head of the Aizomegawa River using illegal and inappropriate construction methods, resulting in inadequate drainage and large amount of sediments, decreasing slope stability.

The Geospatial Information Authority of Japan reported that in the 10 years leading up to the Atami landslide, the area underwent a backfill process with a volume of 56,000 m3, which is equal to the volume of the Atami landslide. In addition, the Atami landslide debris was not composed predominantly of pyroclastic materials, but rather of refilled waste, implying that the Atami landslide was not caused by the inherent soil property of the region, but by the backfill of landfill waste products.

These facts suggest that human factors (construction of a landfill) are also responsible for the Atami landslide.

=== Administrative factors ===
In addition to natural factors and human factors, there is evidence that inadequate administrative oversight is also partly responsible for the Atami landslide.

The total volume of the landfill at the head of the Aizomegawa River reached twice the volume than that initially authorized well before the Atami landslide. Also, local regulations require that special measures be taken when the height of the landfill exceeds 15 meters, but no special measures have been taken even when the height exceeded 50 meters.

There are internal administrative documents suggesting that prefectural and city officials were aware these dangers as early as 2008, but were slow and ineffective in taking necessary steps to remove the potentially dangerous factors.

Prefectural and city officials have concluded on multiple occasions in the decade leading up to the landslide that the mound and landfill “will likely pose a risk to the lives and fortunes of residents if it collapses.” and was “at risk of washout and collapse” and that the operator “needs to correct the (situation) immediately”. Local officials have ordered business operators and landowners to rectify these conditions. However, they were not able to reinforce these orders, in part due to lack of cooperation by business operators and land owners, changes in land ownership, and difficulty contacting the responsible personnel's.

Although the local government knew of the conditions of the landfill years before the landslide, it was unable to effectively carry out the measures needed to rectify these conditions. This suggest that weak administrative oversight is also partially responsible for the Atami landslide.

== Impact of Atami landslide ==
Landslides cause significant damage to infrastructure along with many other complications. The Atami landslide had considerable impact on the community of Atami, Japan. As a result, the 2021 Atami landslide left 27 people dead and one person was reported missing. The landslide also accounted for multiple injuries. As a result of the landslide up to 274 disaster cases were reported. Unfortunately the most vulnerable seemed to be the most affected with 60% of the affected population being elderly. Local authorities issued warnings for "life threatening conditions" and unfortunately many people were trapped in their houses.

=== Impact on infrastructure and the community of Atami ===
The extent of the damage was contributed to the length of the landslide. The debris flow continued for roughly 2 km and the total area affected measured up to 73 400m². The effect on the economy and infrastructure were significant with 128 houses in poor condition. Most houses are aged and in poor condition to start with which meant 50% of fatalities occurred inside buildings or houses. Up to 131 houses were completely demolished by the landslide which continued for almost 2 km to the sea.

The extent of damage caused by the Atami landslide was also contributed due to the high slope of almost 400m from starting point to the sea. This meant that many houses were severely damaged as the height of the debris flow surpassed double story houses. The power and velocity created by the slope as well as the long travel distance had significant destructive power.

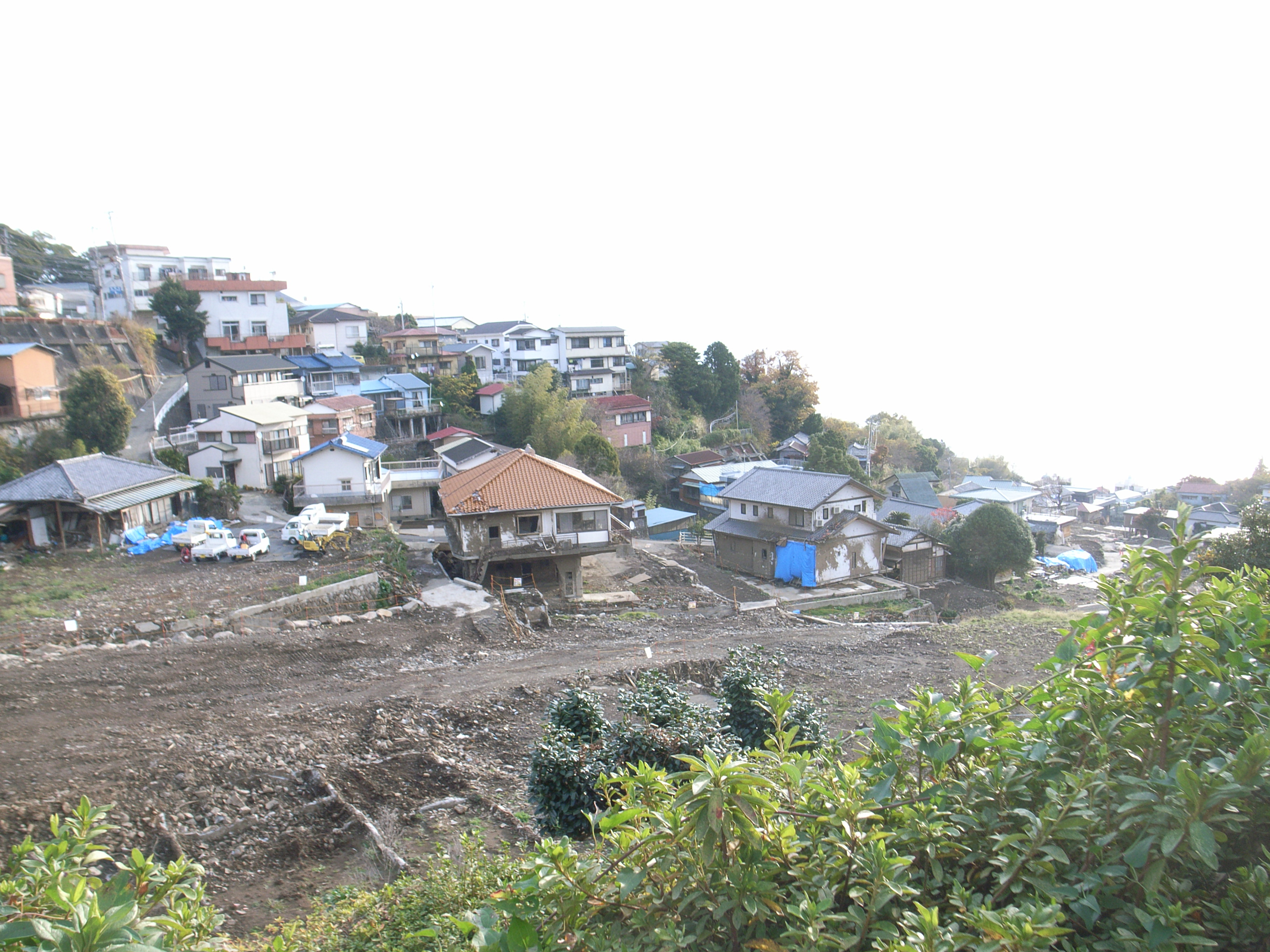
Damaged houses and infrastructure caused by Atami landslide

Due to the landslide the power supply was interrupted and left most people without access to water. As a result of the floods and landslide almost 600 people were displaced and had to sought after alternative housing options. Most people had to resort to temporary housing or staying with familiar people like family and friends. Almost a year later up to 144 people still had to take up interim housing.

Preparations and local regulations were not optimal which contributed to the increased effect and impact of the landslide on Atami.

=== Impact and consequences on health ===
==== Short-term consequences ====
- Crush injuries is a common complication after landslides due to the significant load of the debris. The landslide resulted in multiple injuries and 27 deaths.

- Infectious diseases is a common phenomena after landslides due to contamination of water supplies by the debris flow. Water supply was interrupted by the Atami landslide, yet no reports were released on the increase of infectious diseases.

- Water and sanitation were interrupted by the Atami landslide which increase the risk of infectious diseases. Many people of the community did not have access to clean water to drink for several days after the landslide.

==== Long-term consequences ====
- Mental health: Post-traumatic stress disorder is common after landslides. A lack of family support were prevalent due to hundreds of people displaced after the landslide, which also has an effect on mental health. Minimal reports and follow-up were done to screen the mental state of survivors of the Atami landslide.

- Healthcare system: Damage to hospitals and clinics lead to a loss of resources and health care workers. Luckily, disaster management assistant teams (DMAT) were able to access victims and transport them to hospitals.

- The risk for vector borne diseases are increased due to long term environmental changes caused primarily by the alterations in river flow and deforestation. Long term effects on vector borne diseases are yet to be determined after the Atami landslide.

=== Ecological effects of landslide ===
The landslide resulted in significant damage of local plant life/ flora which ultimately formed part of the debris flow.

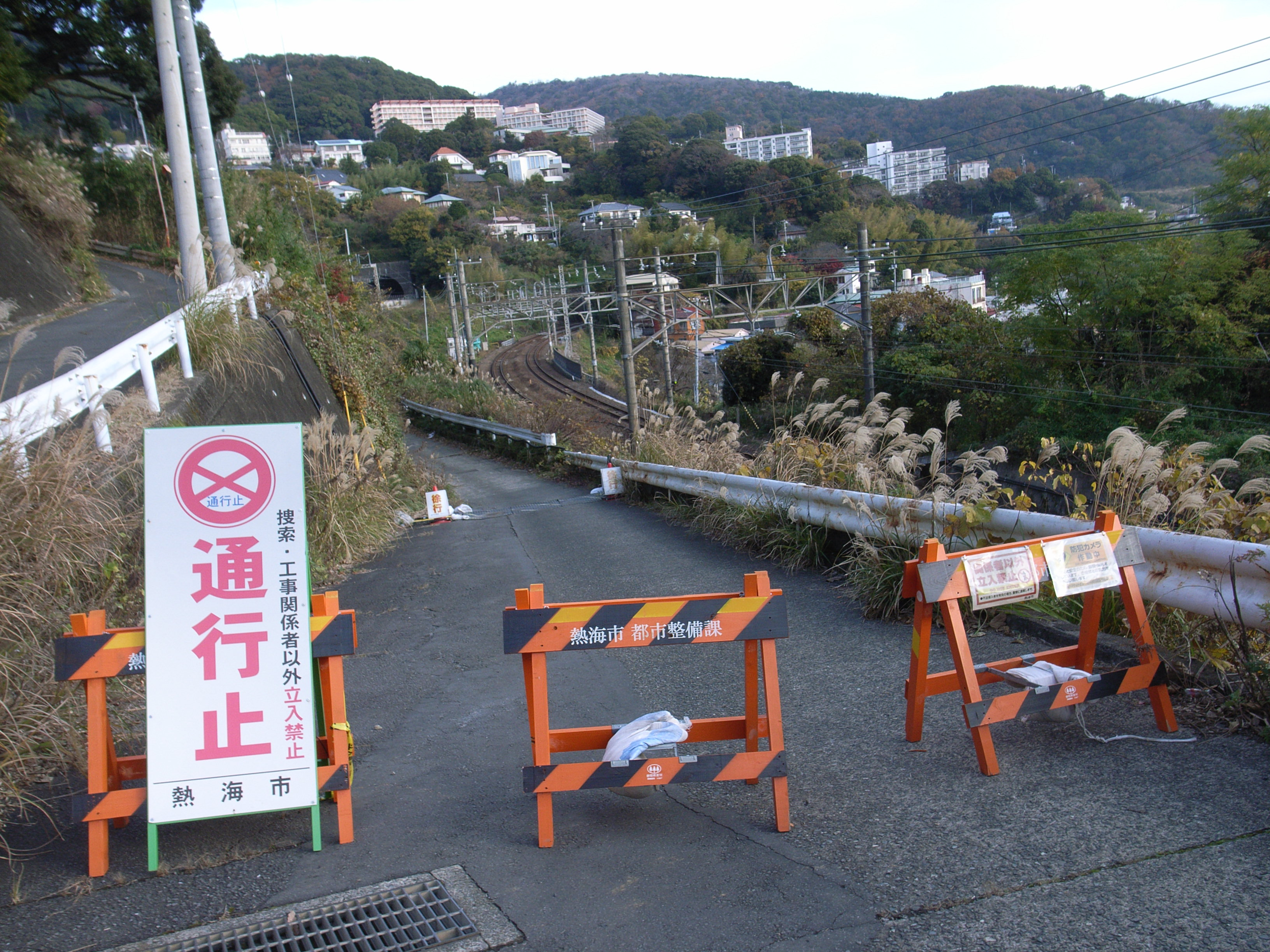
Roads blocked after Atami landslide

=== Transportation and accessibility ===
Roads and railway tracks were affected by the debris flow which ultimately effected public transportation. The damage to transportation and public roads effected accessibility to multiple essential services such as hospitals for the community of Atami. Although the DMAT's were able to access the community to provide assistance during the disaster and they continued to provide assistance for almost 14 days after.

== Local and international responses ==
=== Local responses ===
==== Emergency relief operations ====
In the immediate aftermath of the disaster, Japan's emergency services went into action, with firefighters, police, and the Self-Defense Forces conducting search and rescue operations. Approximately 1,300 search and rescue personnel were involved in rescue and recovery efforts. During the search and rescue period, after heavy rainfall, despite the difficult search and rescue conditions, searchers used drones and heavy machinery to clear debris and search for survivors.

==== Evacuation and shelter support ====
Local authorities established emergency shelters as a means of accommodating displaced families. However, due to the large number of evacuees, it was a challenge to control overcrowding and ensure that the shelters had enough space for the residents. In the end, approximately 570 residents took refuge in nearby public facilities. Meanwhile Japan's emergency services provided these residents with basic needs such as food, medical care and security.

==== Post-disaster investigations and legal actions ====
After the 2021 Atami landslide, investigations revealed that illegal dumping of dirt and poor construction methods were responsible for the disaster. Mounds of earth were improperly constructed and did not have adequate drainage systems, thus making them more prone to collapse during heavy rains. In addition, the Government took legal action against those responsible, emphasizing the policy implications and committing itself to stricter enforcement of construction and land-use regulations.

==== Recovery and reconstruction efforts ====
After the Atami landslide in 2021, the Japanese government invested significant resources in reconstruction. Reconstruction efforts have focused on restoring basic infrastructure, such as roads and utilities, and providing financial support to affected residents. At the same time, authorities have implemented stricter land-use regulations and conducted extensive reviews of similar development projects across the country to prevent future disasters. Monitoring systems and early warning technologies are being improved, and the Government has prioritised sustainable development to reduce the vulnerability of high-risk areas to landslides. In addition, the Government of Japan had begun research and development of emerging technologies to open up geospatial information data, which provided richer information experience and better post-disaster protection measures. This technology provides better information and experience, as well as better post-disaster protection measures, and better assistance for post-disaster health care and people's well-being.

=== International responses ===
==== Condolences and support ====
In the wake of the Atami 2021 landslide in Japan, there have been expressions of condolence and support from around the globe. United Nations Secretary-General António Guterres also picked up on the incident and offered his condolences.

==== Media coverage and appeals ====
In terms of media coverage, in addition to the detailed news of the landslides on the island of Atami, the international media highlighted the wider impacts of climate change, a disaster that has prompted the media to focus on the growing challenges posed by climate change and extreme weather events.

== Lessons emerged from disaster ==
The Atami landslide, caused by heavy rainfall and compounded by human activity, provides several critical lessons for disaster risk reduction, urban planning, and climate adaptation. The key insights are as follows:

=== Improper land use and its consequences ===
The disaster investigation revealed that excessive and unregulated accumulation of soil and debris in a designated residential development area significantly exacerbated the landslide. These actions increased slope instability and amplified the debris flow's destructive impact. This underscores the necessity of stricter enforcement of land-use regulations and regular inspections, especially in areas with steep terrain and high rainfall.

=== Role of climate change in increasing risk ===
The intensity and frequency of torrential rains in Japan have been rising, consistent with global climate change patterns. Atami experienced 310 millimeters of rainfall in 48 hours, far exceeding safe thresholds. This emphasizes the need to incorporate climate resilience into urban planning and infrastructure design, especially in regions prone to hydrological and geological hazards.

=== Importance of disaster prepardness ===
The event highlighted gaps in local preparedness, particularly in early evacuation and communication systems. Despite the warnings of "life-threatening conditions," many residents were caught unaware. Enhanced community-based disaster preparedness programs, clear evacuation protocols, and robust early warning systems are crucial to reducing casualties in similar future events.

=== Technological integration for risk assessment ===
Advanced technologies played a pivotal role in post-disaster investigations. Ring shear tests and computer simulations were conducted to analyze soil behavior and flow dynamics. These tools provided a clearer understanding of the causes and effects of the landslide, showing the value of integrating cutting-edge science into disaster risk management.

=== Advancing open data and collaborative governance ===
The disaster emphasized the importance of open data initiatives and collaborative governance to improve disaster resilience. Making geo-spatial, hydrological, and urban planning data accessible can help communities and governments co-develop risk reduction strategies. Effective use of open governance frameworks ensures transparency and enhances trust between stakeholders.

== See also ==
- Kamenose landslide
