= Atami =

Atami 熱海市
- City
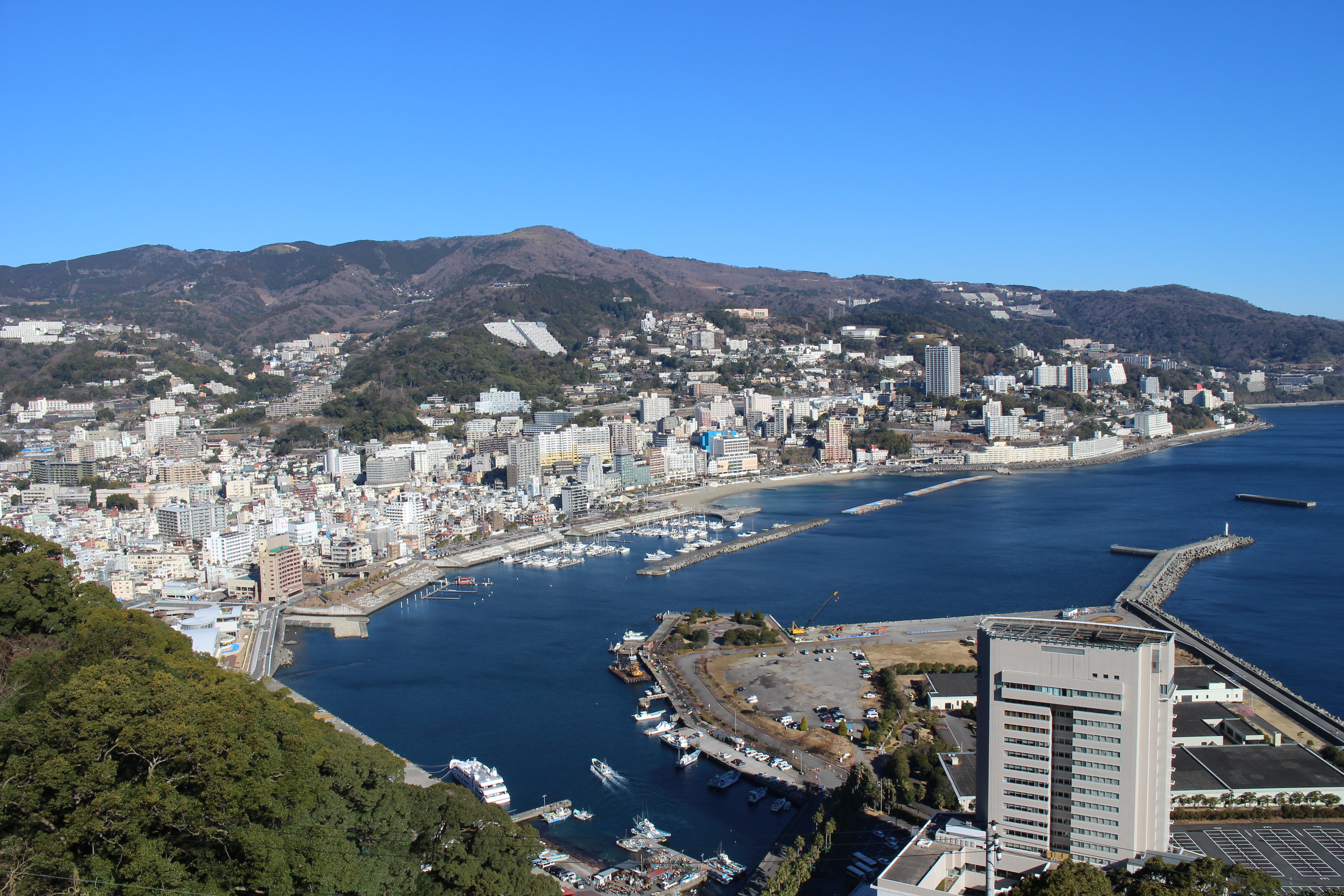
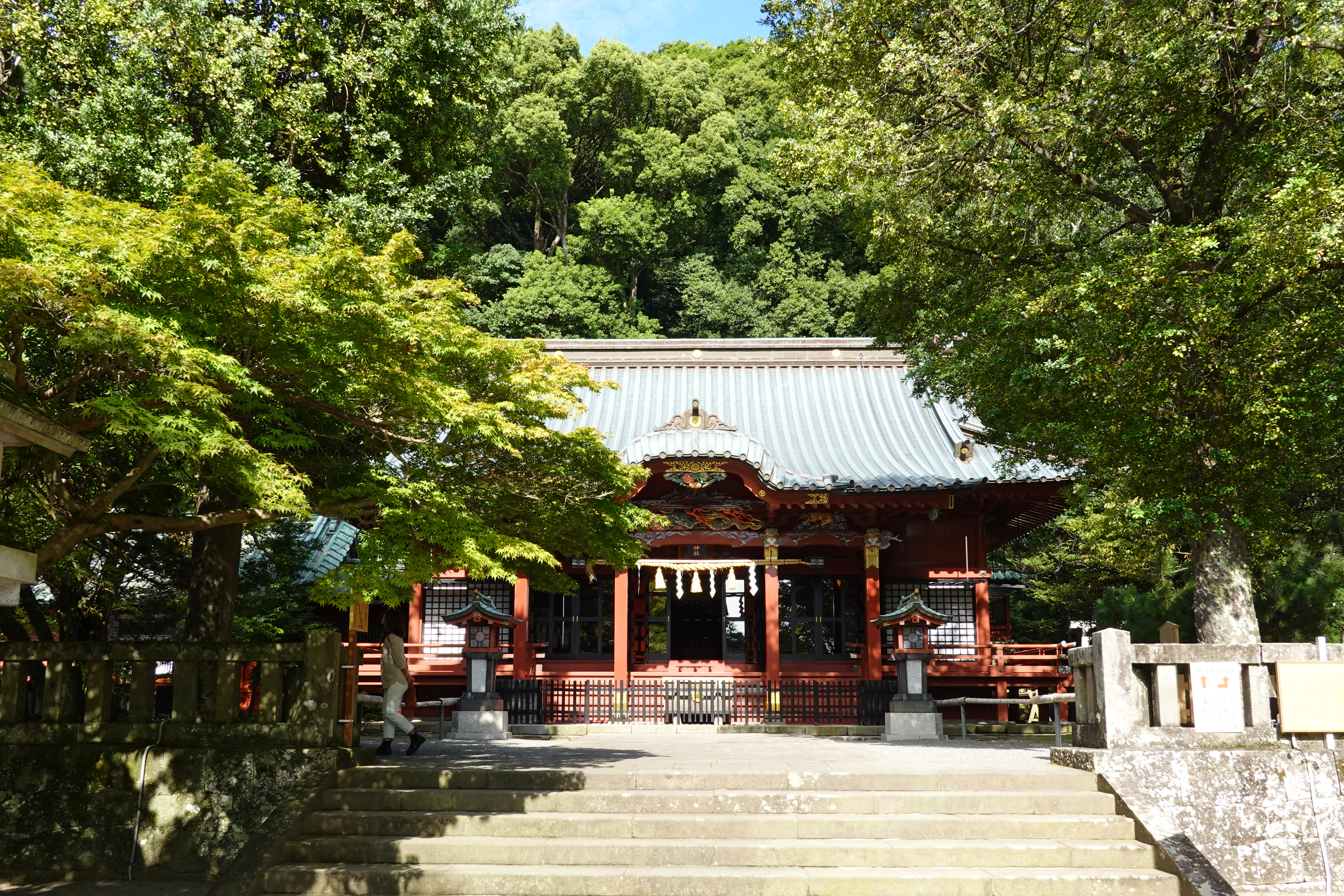
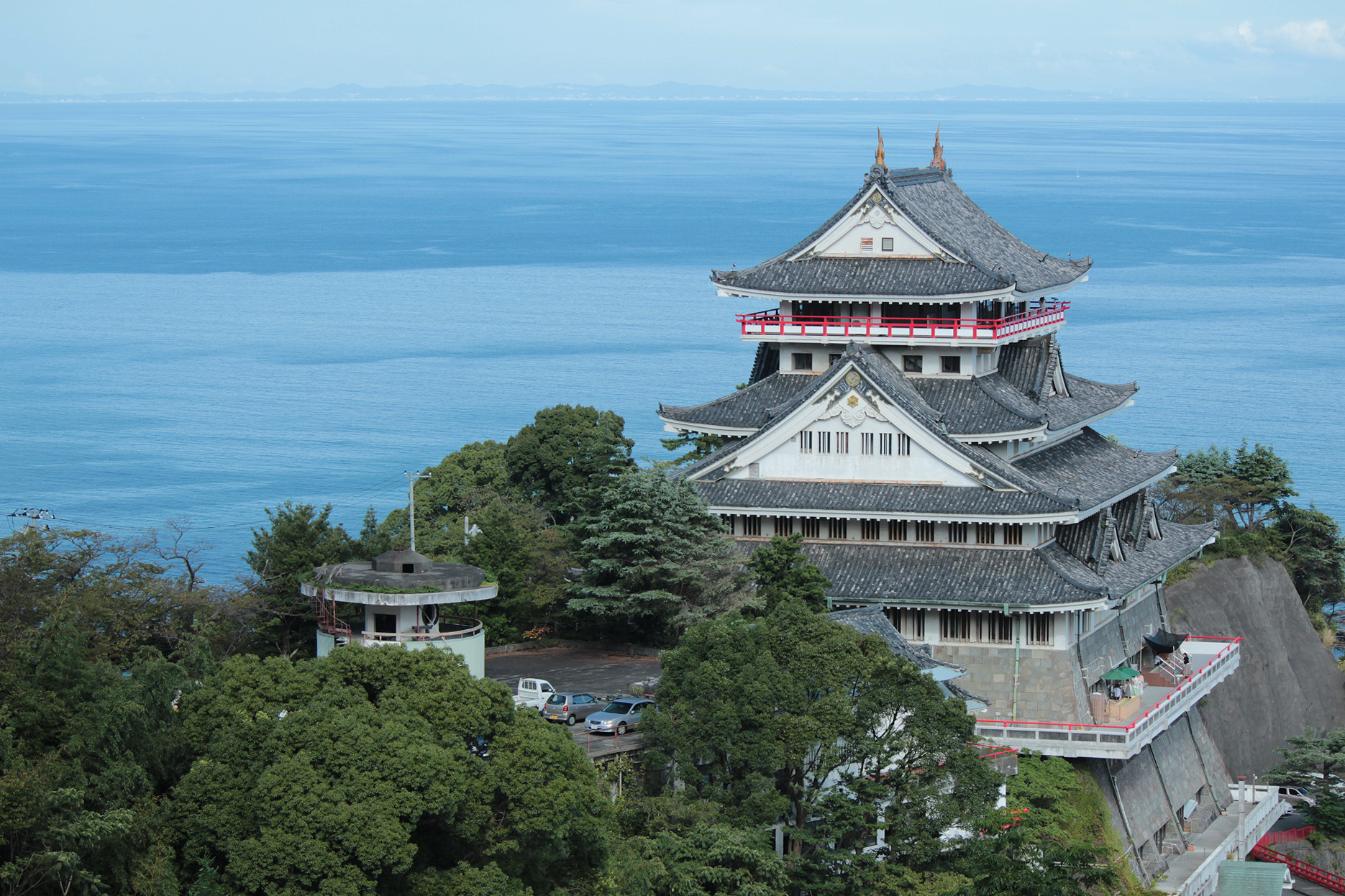
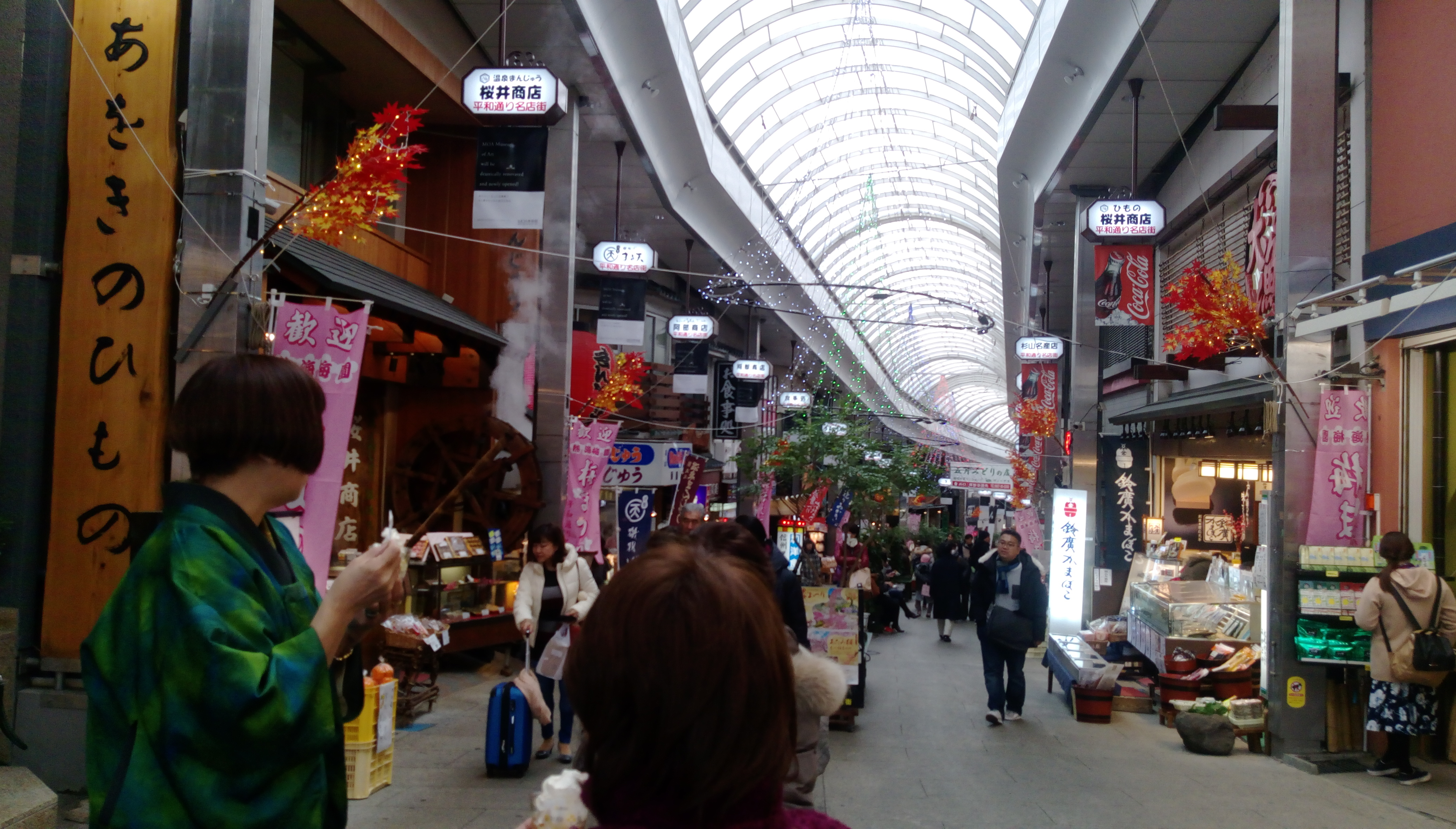
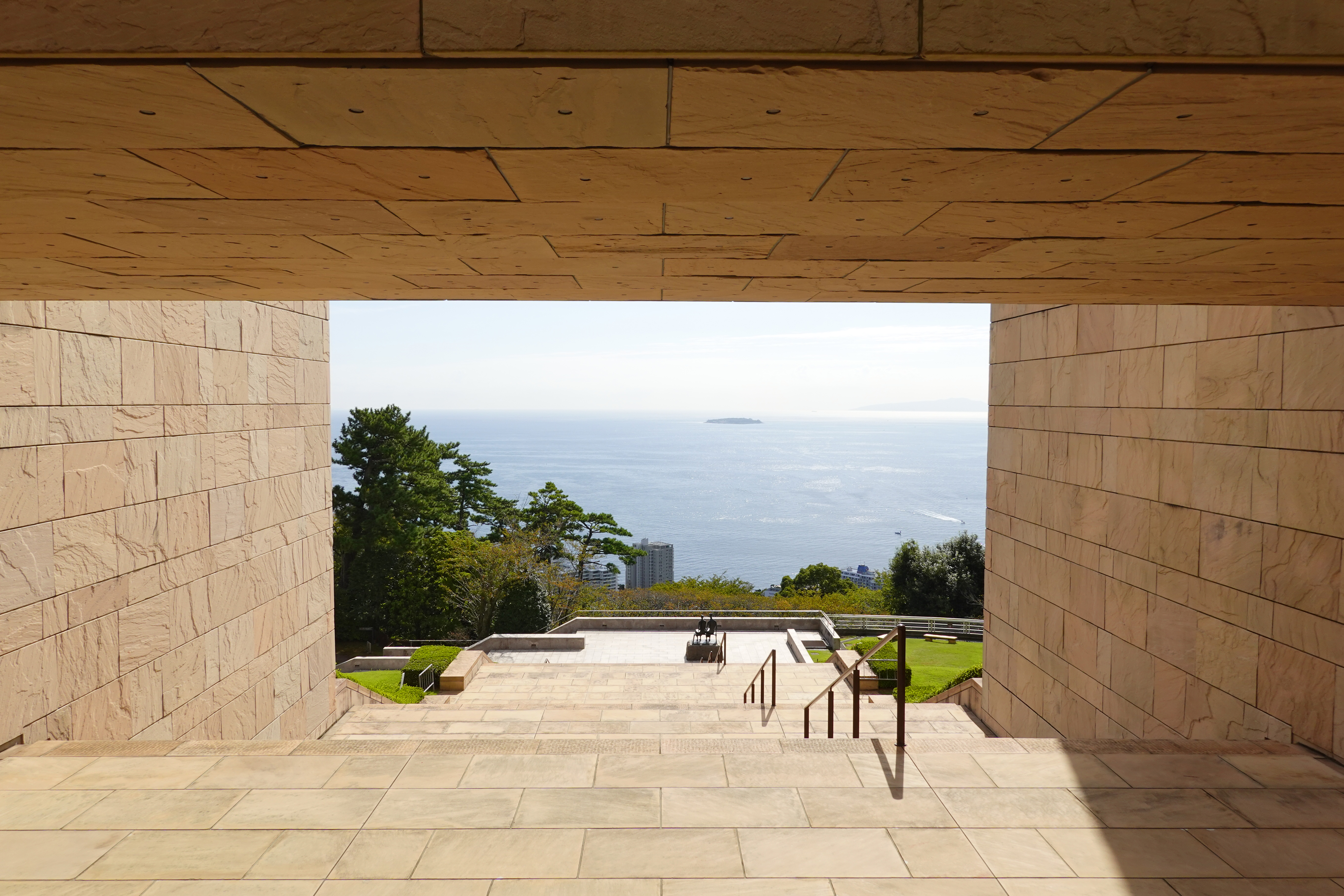
- From top, left to right: View of Atami city from the cliffs of Nishikigaura, Izusan Shrine, Atami Castle, Atami Ekimae Shopping Street, and MOA Museum of Art

- Flag Emblem

- Location of Atami in Shizuoka Prefecture

- Coordinates: 35°05′45.5″N 139°4′17.6″E
- Country: Japan
- Region: Chūbu
- Prefecture: Shizuoka
- First official recorded: 699 AD
- City Settled: April 10, 1937

Government
  - Mayor: Sakae Saitō

Area
  - Total: 61.78 km^{2} (23.85 sq mi)

Population (October 1, 2020)
  - Total: 34,233
  - Density: 554.1/km^{2} (1,435/sq mi)
- Time zone: UTC+09:00 (JST)
- Postal code: 413-8550
- Phone number: 0557-86-6000
- Address: 1-1 Chūō-chō, Atami-shi, Shizuoka-ken
- Climate: Cfa
- Website: Official website
- Symbols
- Bird: Common gull
- Flower: Ume
- Tree: Sakura

Atami (熱海市, Atami-shi; Japanese pronunciation: [ä́.tä̀.mʲì, ä̀.tä́.mʲí.ɕì]) is a city located in Shizuoka Prefecture, Japan. As of 1 May 2019, the city had an estimated population of 36,865 in 21,593 households and a population density of 600 persons per km^{2}. The total area of the city is 61.78 square kilometres (23.85 sq mi).

== Geography ==
Atami is located in the far eastern corner of Shizuoka Prefecture at the northern end of Izu Peninsula. The city is on the steep slopes of a partially submerged volcanic caldera on the edge of Sagami Bay. Atami literally means "hot ocean", due to the town's famous onsen hot springs. The city boundaries include the offshore island of Hatsushima. Most of Atami is located within the Fuji-Hakone-Izu National Park. Warmed by the Kuroshio Current offshore, the area is known for its moderate maritime climate with hot, humid summers, and short winters.

=== Surrounding municipalities ===
- Kanagawa Prefecture
  - Yugawara
- Shizuoka Prefecture
  - Itō
  - Izunokuni
  - Kannami

=== Climate ===
The city has a climate characterized by hot and humid summers, and relatively mild winters (Köppen climate classification: Cfa). The average annual temperature in Atami is 16.3 °C (61.3 °F). The average annual rainfall is 2,012.7 mm (79.24 in) with September as the wettest month. The temperatures are highest on average in August, at around 26.4 °C (79.5 °F), and lowest in January, at around 7.0 °C (44.6 °F).

Climate data for Ajiro, Atami (1991−2020 normals, extremes 1937−present)
Month	Jan	Feb	Mar	Apr	May	Jun	Jul	Aug	Sep	Oct	Nov	Dec	Year
Record high °C (°F)	25.1 (77.2)	25.4 (77.7)	26.1 (79.0)	28.6 (83.5)	32.1 (89.8)	35.0 (95.0)	36.5 (97.7)	37.9 (100.2)	36.7 (98.1)	31.9 (89.4)	26.5 (79.7)	24.1 (75.4)	37.9 (100.2)
Mean maximum °C (°F)	16.5 (61.7)	19.3 (66.7)	21.7 (71.1)	25.5 (77.9)	29.0 (84.2)	30.9 (87.6)	34.1 (93.4)	34.6 (94.3)	32.5 (90.5)	28.3 (82.9)	22.9 (73.2)	19.3 (66.7)	35.1 (95.2)
Mean daily maximum °C (°F)	10.7 (51.3)	11.3 (52.3)	14.2 (57.6)	18.8 (65.8)	22.7 (72.9)	25.0 (77.0)	28.9 (84.0)	30.2 (86.4)	26.7 (80.1)	21.8 (71.2)	17.2 (63.0)	12.9 (55.2)	20.0 (68.1)
Daily mean °C (°F)	7.0 (44.6)	7.4 (45.3)	10.1 (50.2)	14.5 (58.1)	18.5 (65.3)	21.4 (70.5)	25.2 (77.4)	26.4 (79.5)	23.3 (73.9)	18.7 (65.7)	14.0 (57.2)	9.6 (49.3)	16.3 (61.4)
Mean daily minimum °C (°F)	3.9 (39.0)	4.0 (39.2)	6.6 (43.9)	10.9 (51.6)	15.3 (59.5)	18.8 (65.8)	22.6 (72.7)	23.8 (74.8)	20.9 (69.6)	16.1 (61.0)	11.3 (52.3)	6.6 (43.9)	13.4 (56.1)
Mean minimum °C (°F)	0.2 (32.4)	0.2 (32.4)	1.9 (35.4)	4.9 (40.8)	10.7 (51.3)	14.8 (58.6)	18.6 (65.5)	20.2 (68.4)	16.4 (61.5)	11.6 (52.9)	6.7 (44.1)	2.4 (36.3)	−0.5 (31.1)
Record low °C (°F)	−3.1 (26.4)	−4.5 (23.9)	−2.4 (27.7)	1.8 (35.2)	6.0 (42.8)	11.8 (53.2)	13.5 (56.3)	17.1 (62.8)	13.4 (56.1)	7.7 (45.9)	2.4 (36.3)	−2.7 (27.1)	−4.5 (23.9)
Average precipitation mm (inches)	76.1 (3.00)	82.0 (3.23)	158.0 (6.22)	168.1 (6.62)	172.6 (6.80)	251.5 (9.90)	242.5 (9.55)	186.0 (7.32)	263.9 (10.39)	237.3 (9.34)	108.4 (4.27)	66.3 (2.61)	2,012.7 (79.24)
Average snowfall cm (inches)	0 (0)	1 (0.4)	0 (0)	0 (0)	0 (0)	0 (0)	0 (0)	0 (0)	0 (0)	0 (0)	0 (0)	0 (0)	1 (0.4)
Average precipitation days (≥ 1.0 mm)	6.1	6.7	10.7	10.2	10.0	12.4	10.9	8.2	12.1	10.2	7.9	6.1	111.5
Average snowy days (≥ 1 cm)	0	0.2	0	0	0	0	0	0	0	0	0	0	0.2
Average relative humidity (%)	59	60	64	67	72	80	80	79	78	73	69	62	70
Mean monthly sunshine hours	147.4	142.8	158.2	176.4	184.1	127.7	161.8	194.1	136.9	126.0	128.5	142.8	1,826.7
Source: Japan Meteorological Agency

== Demographics ==
As of 1 May 2019, with the city's estimated population of 36,865 and per Japanese census data, the population of Atami has been in slow decline over the past half century.

Historical population
Year	Pop.	±%
1940	27,966	—
1950	38,938	+39.2%
1960	52,163	+34.0%
1970	51,281	−1.7%
1980	50,082	−2.3%
1990	47,291	−5.6%
2000	42,936	−9.2%
2010	39,592	−7.8%

== History ==
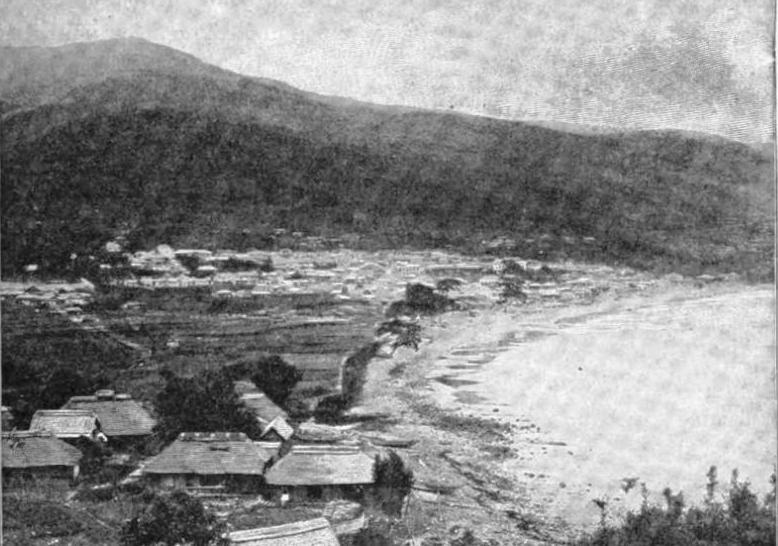
View of Atami in 1900

Atami has been known as a resort town centered on its hot springs since the 8th century AD. In the Kamakura period, Minamoto no Yoritomo and Hōjō Masako were notable visitors. During the Edo period, all of Izu Province was tenryō territory under direct control of the Tokugawa shogunate. During the cadastral reform of the early Meiji period in 1889, Atami village was organized within Kamo District, Shizuoka. It was elevated to town status on June 11, 1894, and was transferred to the administrative control of Tagata District in 1896.

The epicenter of the Great Kantō earthquake in 1923 was deep beneath Izu Ōshima Island in Sagami Bay, close to Atami, which suffered considerable damage, as did other municipalities throughout the surrounding Kantō region. The tsunami wave height reached 11 meters (35 feet) at Atami, swamping the town and drowning three hundred people.

In 1932, Japanese authorities raided a meeting of members of the Japanese Communist Party in Atami.

The Inagawa-kai, third largest of Japan's yakuza groups, was founded in Atami in 1949 as the Inagawa-gumi (稲川組) by Kakuji Inagawa.

In 1963 the Japanese Communist Party established a study facility in the mountains near Atami. The JCP holds a triennial congress there.

The modern city of Atami was founded on April 10, 1937, through the merger of Atami Town with neighboring Taga Village. After the proclamation of Atami as an "International Tourism and Culture City" by the Japanese government in 1950, the area experienced rapid growth in large resort hotel development. This growth increased after Atami station became a stop on the Tōkaidō Shinkansen high-speed train line in 1964. In concert with its famous onsen, Atami was known for its onsen geisha.

Atami experienced a considerable decline in popularity as a vacation destination due to the Japanese economic crisis in the 1990s and the associated fall in large group company-sponsored vacations, but is currently experiencing a revival as a commuter town due to its proximity to Tokyo and Yokohama.

=== 2021 landslide ===
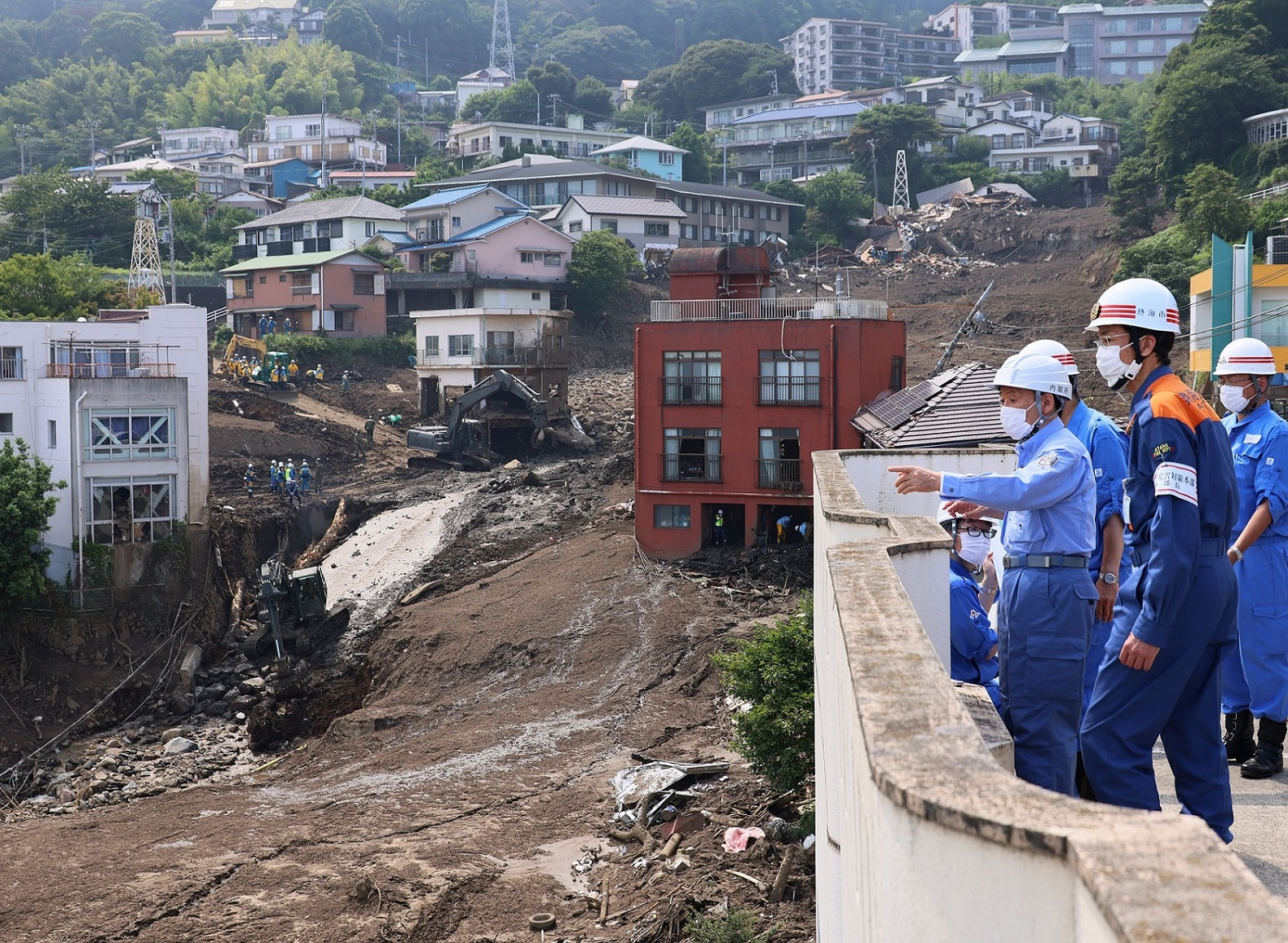
Prime Minister Suga overlooks an area of Atami damaged by the 2021 landslide

Following torrential rainfall a landslide was triggered which swept through part of the city on 3 July 2021. 27 people were killed and 3 were injured.

== Government ==
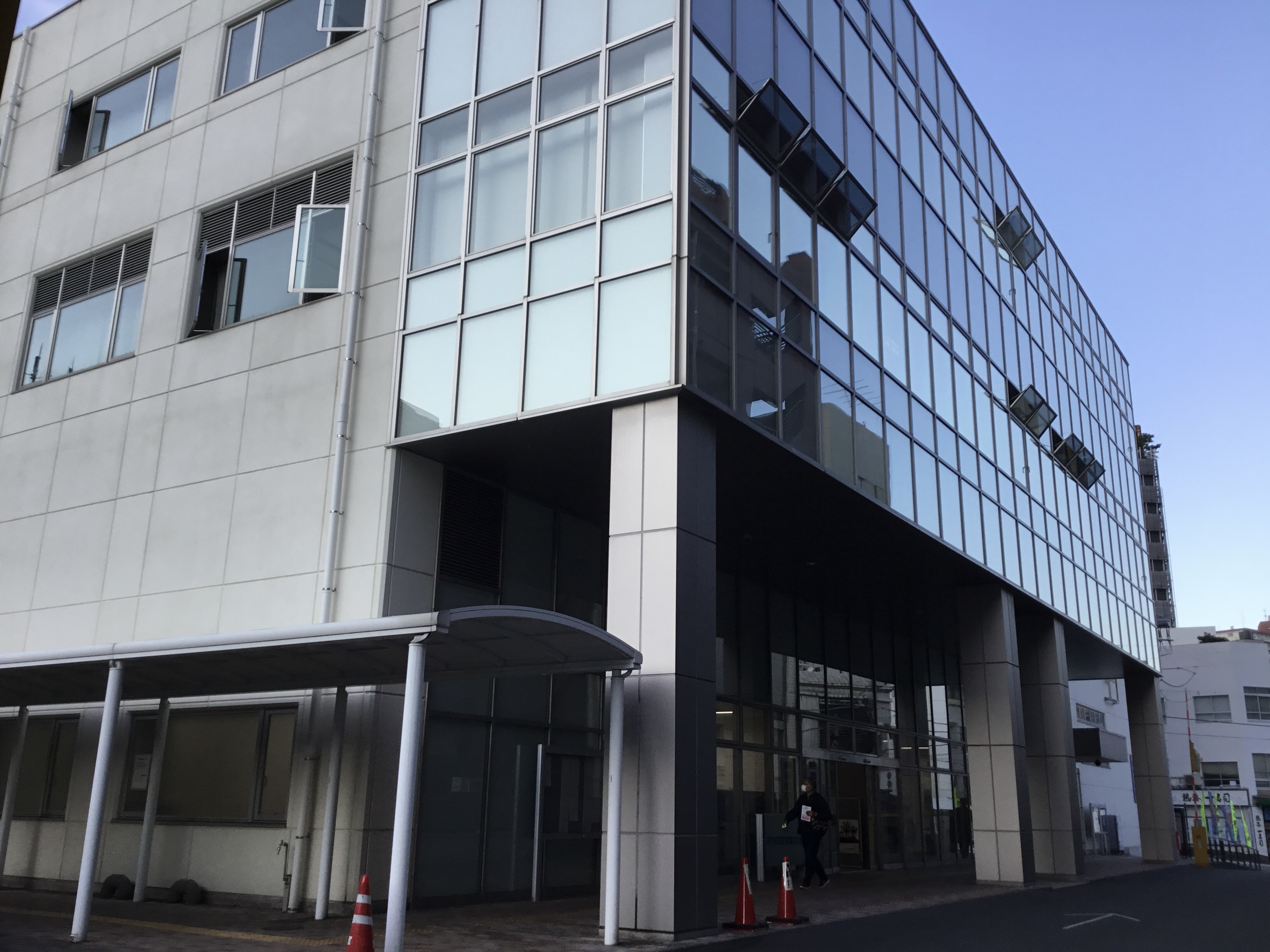
Atami City Hall

Atami has a mayor-council form of government with a directly elected mayor and a unicameral city legislature of 15 members.

== Economy ==
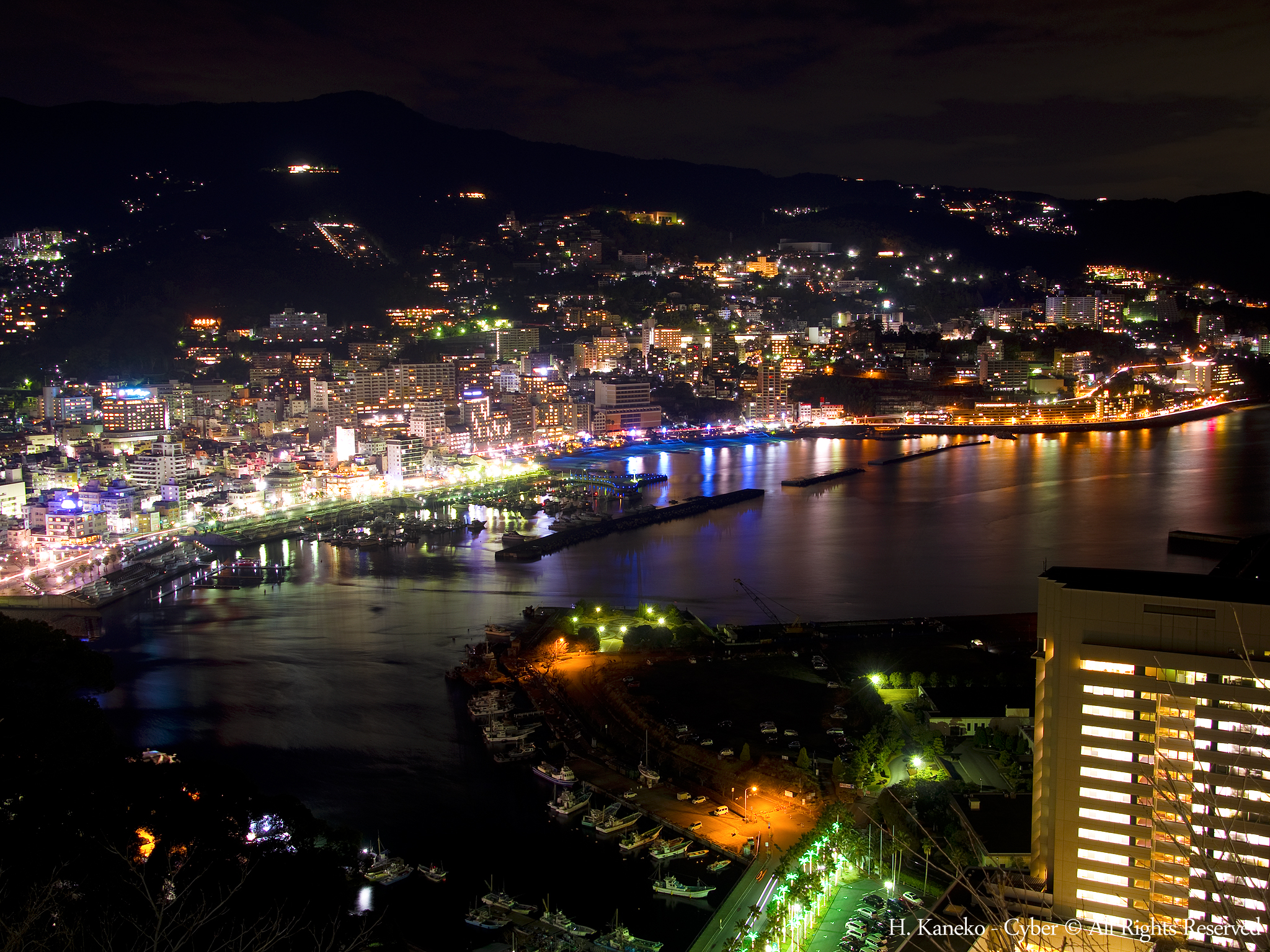
Atami at night

The economy of Atami is heavily dependent on the tourist industry, mostly centered on its hot spring resorts. Commercial fishing is a major secondary industry.

== Education ==
Atami has eight public elementary schools and four public junior high schools operated by the city government, and one public high school operated by the Shizuoka Prefectural Board of Education. The International University of Health and Welfare, based in Ōtawara, Tochigi, has a campus in Atami.

== Transport ==
=== Railway ===
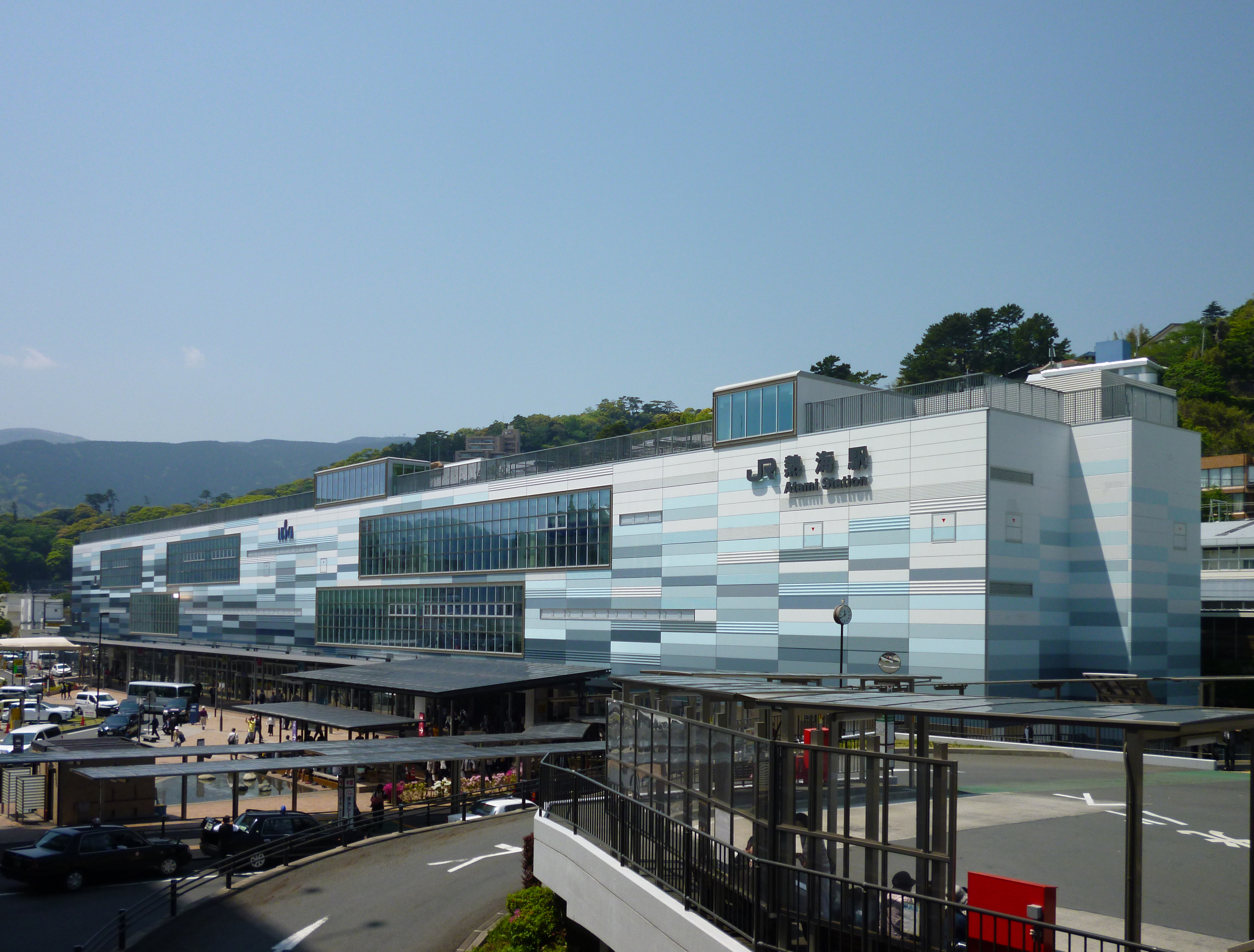
Atami Station, 2018

- Central Japan Railway Company - Tōkaidō Shinkansen
  - Atami Station
- East Japan Railway Company - Tōkaidō Main Line
  - Atami Station
- East Japan Railway Company - Itō Line
  - Atami Station – Kinomiya Station – Izu-Taga Station – Ajiro Station

=== Highway ===
- National Route 135
- Atami Beach Line
- Izu Skyline

== Sister cities ==
Atami is twinned with:

- Beppu, Ōita, Japan, since August 1966
- Sanremo, Italy, since November 1976
- Cascais, Portugal, since July 1990
- Zhuhai, China, friendship city since July 2004

== Notable people ==
- Yū Hayami, singer, actress
- Yuka Imai, voice actress
- Yuji Ohno, jazz musician
- Atamifuji Sakutarō, professional sumo wrestler
- Mitsuko Uchida, classical pianist

== Local attractions ==
- Atami Castle, a Japanese castle replica serving as a museum, built in 1959. Features a garden with over 200 sakura trees
- Church of World Messianity headquarters
- Izusan Jinja, an ancient Shinto shrine, a major site of the syncretic Shugendō religion
- MOA Museum of Art, housing the extensive art collection of eccentric multimillionaire and religious leader Mokichi Okada
- Peace Pagoda, built by Nipponzan-Myōhōji in 1961

== In popular culture ==
- In the 1951 film Tokyo File 212, a key scene takes place at a resort in Atami.
- In the 1953 film Tokyo Story, the parents visit the hot springs in Atami.
- Much of the 1953 film, A Japanese Tragedy, is set in Atami.
- Atami appears in the 1954 film, Golden Demon (Konjiki Yasha), based on the novel of the same name by Kōyō Ozaki, as the place where two main characters become engaged to be married.
- In the 1962 film King Kong vs. Godzilla, the final throes of the film's climactic battle between Godzilla and King Kong sees them descending Mount Fuji and into Atami. After destroying Atami Castle during a trade of blows, the two monsters fall over a cliff into Sagami Bay, with Kong emerging as the victor of the fight.
- In the 1967 film Gappa, the Triphibian Monster, the two adult Gappa creatures make landfall in Atami, destroying much of it in the process.
- In episode 89 of the anime series Urusei Yatsura, Mrs. Moroboshi wins a 2-day trip to Atami with her husband, leaving her son Ataru, the main character, at home alone with Lum.
- In the Studio Ghibli anime drama, Only Yesterday, the main character Taeko goes to Atami at age 10, visiting some of the onsen, but she passes out in the Roman bath from dizziness.
- In the first episode of Neon Genesis Evangelion, Shinji Ikari is picked up by Misato Katsuragi in Atami.
- Atami is the setting of the 2010 TV drama Atami no Sousakan.
- In the 2016 anime series Prince of Stride, Atami is the first stop in the End of Summer Trial Tour.
- The 2017 manga Wash It All Away is set in Atami, as is its 2026 anime adaptation.
- In the 2019 video game AI: The Somnium Files, protagonist Kaname Date is a detective solving a murder mystery. In one of the game's endings, he quits the case and goes with a woman to Atami. In the 2022 sequel AI: The Somnium Files – Nirvana Initiative, protagonist Kuruto Ryuki can have a similar ending with the same woman.
- The town of Atami has been consistently referenced in Hideo Kojima's video games, including P.T. (2014), Death Stranding 2: On the Beach (2025), and OD (TBA).
