= Ajiro =

Town in Izu, Japan

Ajiro 網代
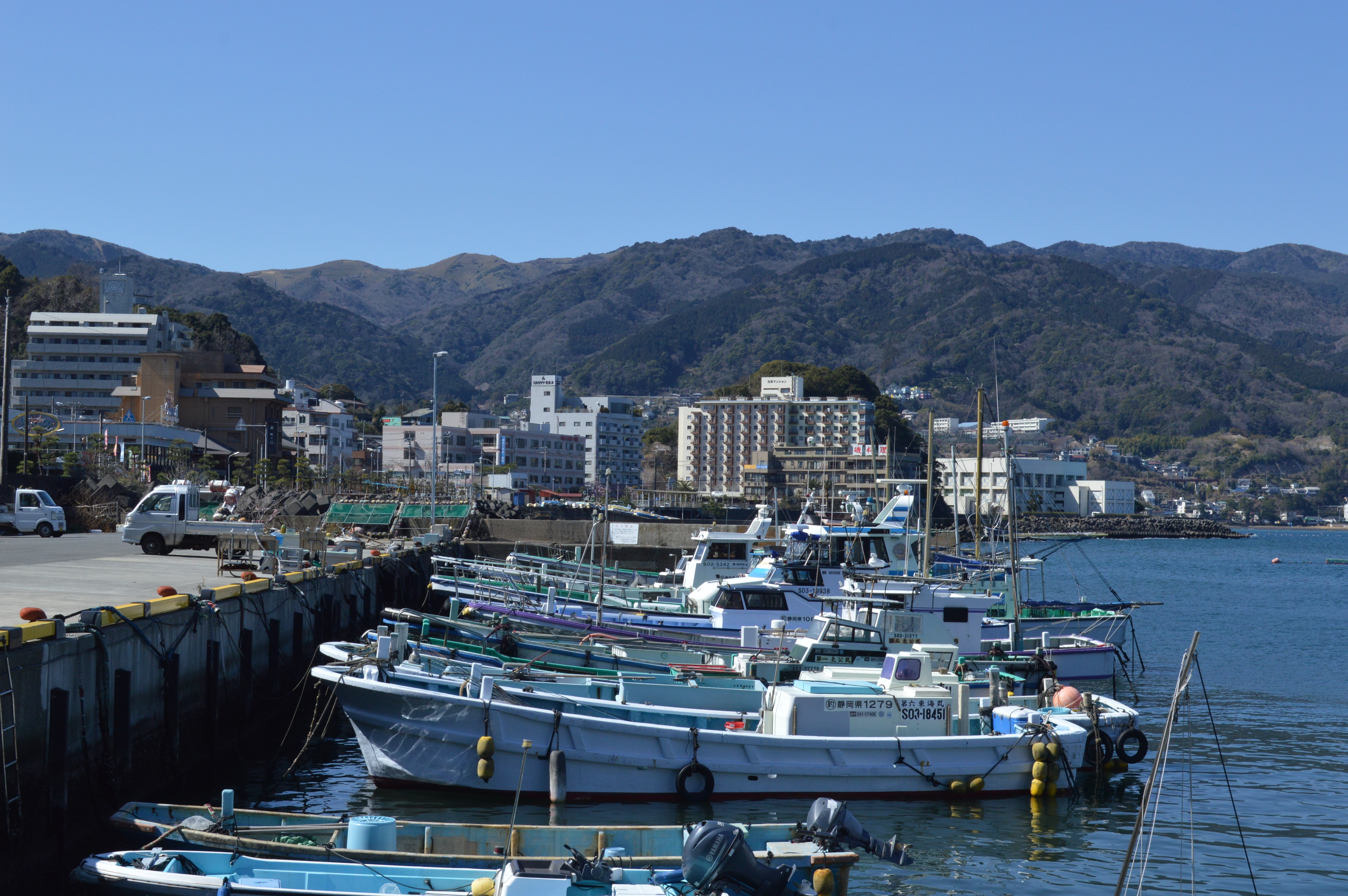
- Ajiro port
- Interactive map of Ajiro
- Country: Japan
- Province: Izu
- Prefecture: Shizuoka

Ajiro (Japanese: 網代) is a small coastal town located in Izu, the southern part of Atami, Shizuoka Prefecture, Japan. It was initially established as "Ajiro Village" in 1889 when the municipal system was enacted during the Meiji era. The town has its own fishing port and onsen.

== History ==
Ajiro has prospered as a port town since the Edo period, known for its hot springs (onsen) and seafood industry. The town experienced significant growth during Japanese asset price bubble, but like many small Japanese towns, it has since faced challenges with population decline and economic stagnation.

== Places ==
=== Ajiro Station ===
Ajiro Station (網代駅, Ajiro-eki) is a railway station on the Itō Line of the East Japan Railway Company, located in the southern part of the city of Atami, Shizuoka Prefecture, Japan. It is also a stop for the limited express Odoriko.

== Legacy ==
=== Television ===
The town of Ajiro is mentioned in Shōgun, an American historical drama television series based on the 1975 novel by James Clavell.
