= Kurashita landslide =

Landslide in Japan

Kurashita landslide (Japanese: 倉下地すべり is located in Hakuba-Mura, Kitaazumi-Gun, Nagano Prefecture, Japan. The landslide is 800m long and 800m wide and covers about 78 hectares of land. The landslide is divided into five blocks, labeled Block A through Block E. The area holds cultural significance as part of Hakuba-Mura, which was the hosting area of the 1998 Nagano Winter Olympics, and remains a major tourist destination.

== Geology ==
Kurashita landslide, located near the Fossa Magna (Itoigawa-Shizuoka Tectonic Line), is part of one of Japan's most active tectonic regions. Ongoing tectonic movements since the Permian Period have created a complex geological structure, making the area prone to landslides. Geologically, the area consists of Jurassic shallow marine deposits, quartz andesite, and Lower Tertiary welded tuff, underlain by Permian to Triassic shale, sandstone, and conglomerate, resting on serpentine melange basement rocks. These layers were mixed and faulted over time. The active Block A is composed entirely of welded tuff, up to 60 meters thick, while Block D, containing Blocks A and B, is now inactive. The slip surface lies within Jurassic marine sedimentary rocks.

== Countermeasures ==
To mitigate landslide risks, the Japanese government launched stabilization works in 1997, including buttress fills, drainage wells, and a 455-meter drainage tunnel using the NATM method, which discharges hundreds of liters of water per minute to relieve pressure.

== See also ==
- Kamenose landslide
- Harabun landslide of Nagasaki prefecture
