= Harabun landslide =

Landslide in Japan

Harabun Landslide is an urban landslide that occurred on July 7, 1997, in Harabun-Cho, a district in Sasebo City, Nagasaki Prefecture, Japan. Triggered by an unusually intense and prolonged rainfall event, the landslide caused extensive destruction to homes, roads, and lifelines in the area, forcing the evacuation of dozens of families and highlighting the risks associated with urban development on unstable slopes.

The landslide covers an area of approximately 0.3 hectares, with length of 70 meters and width of 50. The depth is about 10 meters. The total volume of displaced material was estimated at 17,000 cubic meters.

== Geology ==
Geologically, the site is underlain by Upper Tertiary mudstone and sandstone and overlain by a basaltic caprock. Beneath lies evidence of ancient landslide deposits, indicating a history of slope instability. The landslide occurred at the base of a steep slope situated along an alluvial plain. The moving mass was composed of clayey colluvium derived from volcanic rocks, and the slip surface was located near the boundary between the sedimentary bedrock and the overlying colluvium.

== Cause and effect ==
The event was primarily triggered by torrential rains associated with a stationary rain front that typically forms in Japan during the early summer. In total, 410 millimeters of rain fell over a short period, with an extraordinary maximum hourly rainfall of 174 millimeters recorded between July 10 and 13, 1997. Movement of the slope mass continued for over a month at rates exceeding 10 millimeters per hour, and displacements in the landslide's head area eventually reached five meters within two months.

A total of three houses were completely destroyed, and another three were partially damaged. The disaster also led to significant disruption of road networks and lifeline infrastructure, making access and communication difficult in the immediate aftermath. Because the landslide occurred in a densely populated residential zone, authorities ordered the evacuation of 51 families, comprising 146 residents, who were forced to take shelter in emergency accommodations for approximately two months due to ongoing hazards and the risk of additional slope failures.

== Countermeasures ==
Emergency measures were quickly implemented to stabilize the slope and protect the community. These included the installation of horizontal gravity drains to reduce groundwater pressure and temporary earth-retaining structures at the base of the slope to prevent further debris movement. Given the scale of destruction and ongoing instability, authorities also developed permanent mitigation measures. These involved further improvements to surface drainage systems, the installation of additional horizontal gravity drains, and the construction of structural restraints, including piles and anchors, to reinforce the slope against future movements.

== See also ==
- Kurashita landslide
