= Izusan Shrine =

Shinto shrine in Shizuoka Prefecture, Japan

Izusan Jinja 伊豆山神社
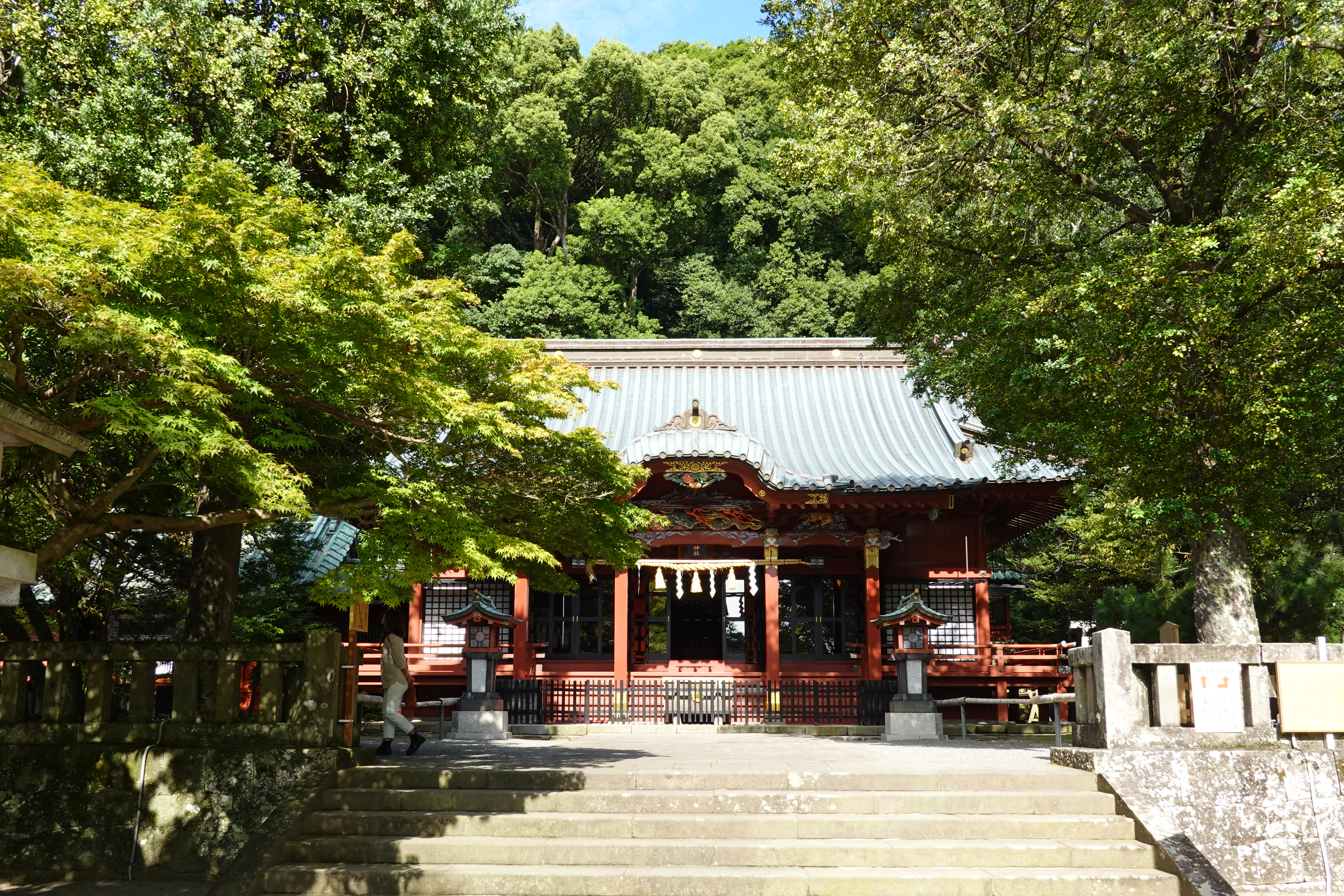
- Honden of Izusan Jinja

- Location within Shizuoka Prefecture Location within Japan

Religion
- Affiliation: Shinto
- Deity: Izu Daigongen

Location
- Location: 708-1 Uenochi, Izusan, Atami, Shizuoka
- Coordinates: 35.115455°N 139.082558°E

Website
- Official website

Izusan Jinja (伊豆山神社) is a Shinto shrine in the city of Atami in Shizuoka Prefecture, Japan. The shrine has been known by many names in its long history, including Soto Jinja (走湯神社). The shrine's main festival is held annually on April 15.

== Enshrined kami ==
The primary kami of Izusan Jinja is the Izu Daigongen (伊豆大権現), an amalgamation of Honomusuhi-no-mikoto (火牟須比命), Izanagi (伊邪那伎命) and his consort Izanami (伊邪那美命)

== History ==
The volcanic springs and a geyser at Atami were regarded in ancient Japan as manifestations of the kami, and ancient records indicate that a shrine already existed here by 594 AD. The actual date of the shrine's foundation is unknown, with shrine legend mentioning the semi-legendary Emperor Kōshō and Empress Suiko as possible candidates. The shrine legend also claims that it was appointed as an official shrine for prayers to the Imperial clan under Emperor Nintoku, Emperor Seinei, Emperor Bidatsu, Emperor Kōtoku and Emperor Go-Nara.

The shrine later became a center of the Shugendō mountain cult.

After he was exiled to Izu, Minamoto no Yoritomo worshipped at Izusan Shrine for divine assistance in his struggle to overthrow the Heike clan in the Genpei War. He also used the shrine grounds as a location to rally the local gōzoku clans to his side. Izu Shrine is also noted as the location to which Yoritomo and Hōjō Masako eloped – an event which brought the Hōjō clan to his side and which was instrumental in the successful establishment of the Kamakura shogunate. Yoritomo and Masako later had the shrine rebuilt on a large scale, and its holdings extended as far as Echigo Province. The shrine was later patronized by the Odawara Hōjō, the Imagawa clan and the Tokugawa clan.

During the Edo period, visitors to Atami increased due to its location near the Tōkaidō connecting Edo with Kyoto, and the need for daimyōs to make regular journeys because of the sankin-kōtai system. The shrine was granted revenues of 300 koku by the Tokugawa shogunate.

Most of the shrine records and many of its structures were lost in the destruction of the shinbutsu bunri movement following the Meiji Restoration.

Crown Prince Hirohito visited the shrine in 1914, and a Japanese Black Pine was planted next to the Honden to commemorate the visit. The shrine was granted the rank of National Shrine, 3rd rank (Kokuhei Shōsha) under State Shinto in 1928.

== See also ==
- List of Shinto shrines
