= Atami Castle =

- 熱海城
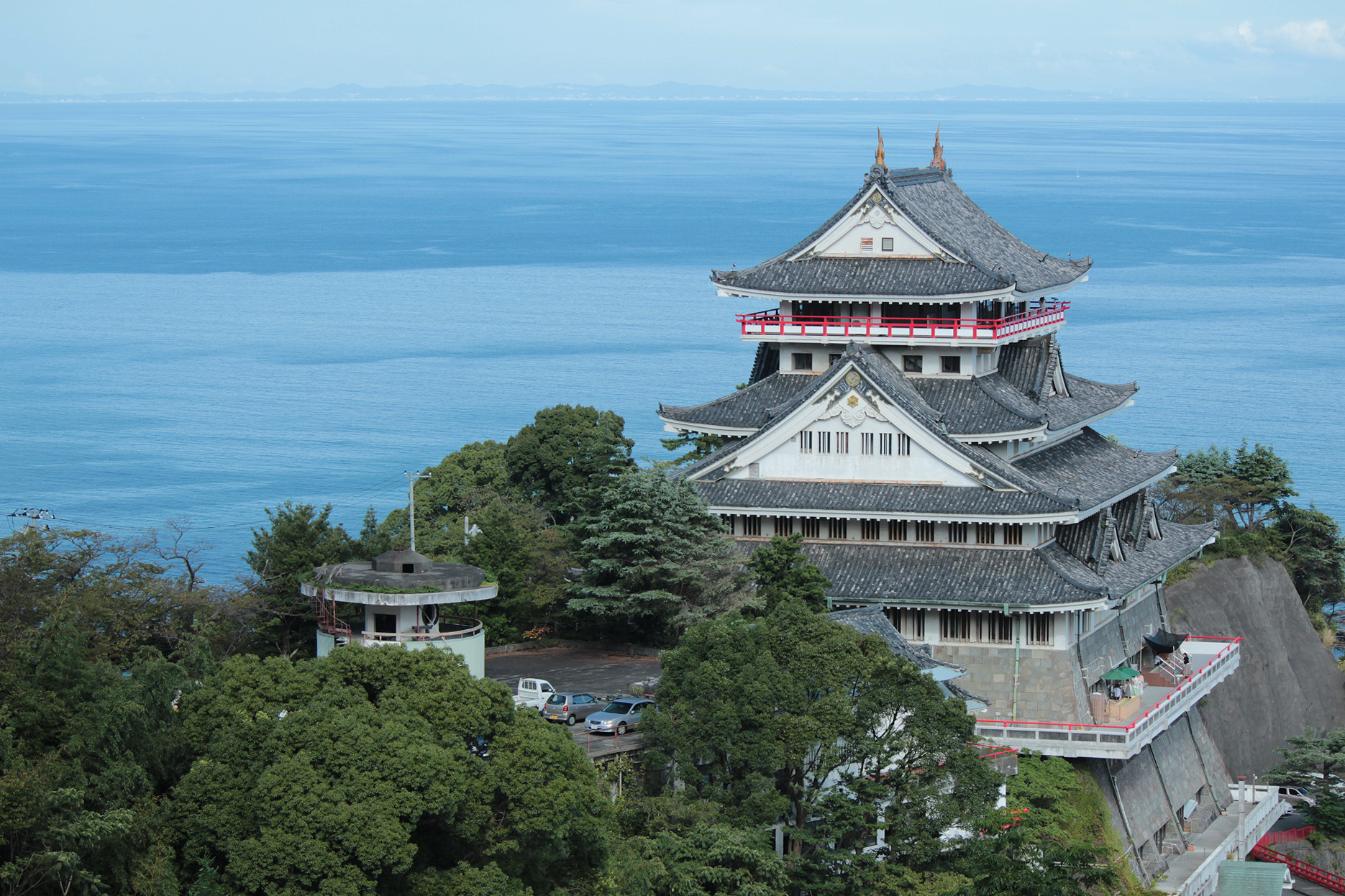
- Atami Castle

General information
- Architectural style: Azuchi-Momoyama styled castle
- Location: Atami, Shizuoka Prefecture, Japan
- Coordinates: 35°05′11″N 139°04′43″E
- Completed: 1959

Website
- https://atamijyo.com/

Atami Castle (熱海城, Atami-jō) is a Japanese castle replica on the summit of Nishikigaura Mountain in Atami, Shizuoka Prefecture. It is one of the most scenic spots in Atami City, offering a panoramic view of the city and southern Atami. The building hosts several museums on Japanese history. 200 sakura trees were planted in the castle's garden, which hosts a cherry blossom festival from late March to early April. First constructed in 1959, Atami castle is not a real historical site.

== History ==
During the Sengoku period the Odawara Hōjō clan considered building a hilltop castle on Nishikigaura for its navy, but were unable to do so.

In the 1950s, the area around Atami experienced rapid growth because of a boom in the domestic tourism industry; Atami Castle was envisioned as a tourist attraction during this period.

== Overview ==
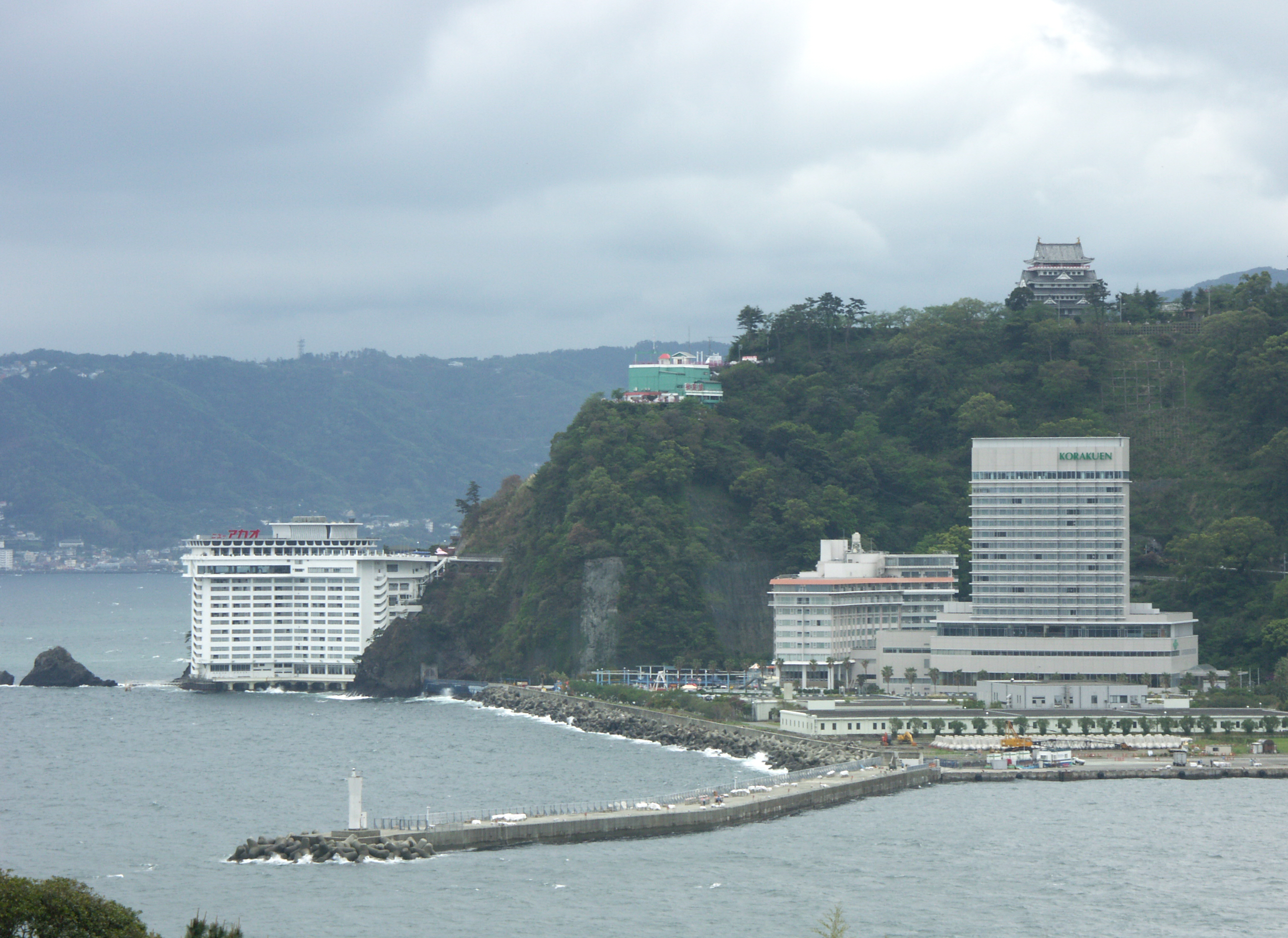
Atami Castle as seen from the North

Atami Castle was built in 1959. It is a reinforced concrete structure with five exterior floors and nine interior floors. Atami Castle is modeled after the tenshu (main keep) of Azuchi–Momoyama period Japanese castles. The castle roof is topped with two golden shachihokos made by sculptor Asano Shoun. Located 120 meters above sea level on top of Nishikigaura Mountain, the castle offers a panoramic view of Atami city, Hatsushima, Izu Ōshima, and Sagami Bay. On clear days, the Tokyo Skytree and Yokohama Landmark Tower are visible from the telescope in the sixth floor panoramic observation deck.

The castle now hosts an Edo period Rebus museum, a Japanese Castle Museum, a Ukiyo-e Erotic Art (Shunga) Museum and a Samurai Culture Museum. There is also a floor where tourists can wear Edo period costumes and interact with replicas of Edo period objects like palanquins and coin boxes.

Over 200 sakura trees were planted in the Atami Castle gardens, the Atami Castle Sakura Blossom Festival is held there from late March to early April. The castle is also a popular viewing spot for the Atami Sea Fireworks Festival.

The castle was famously featured in the 1962 film King Kong vs. Godzilla and the 1967 film Gappa: The Triphibian Monster.

There used to be a hot spring facility underground, and the adjacent annex was used as a lodging facility, but both have been closed.

== Facilities ==
Admission fees are 1200 yen for adults, 650 yen for elementary and middle students, and 500 yen for children aged 3 to 6. The combined ticket fees with the Atami Trick Art Museum next door are 2000 yen for adults, 1050 yen for elementary and middle school students, and 800 yen for children aged 3 to 6.

- 6th floor - Panoramic Observation Tower
- 5th floor - Touch & Try Edo Corner
- 4th floor - World of Rebus
- 3rd floor - Ukiyo-e Erotic Art (Shunga) Exhibition
- 2nd floor - Japanese Castle Museum
- 1st floor - Samurai Culture Museum (Displays of armor, Japanese swords, matchlock guns)
  - An open air foot bath in the viewing platform
- Basement - Free play facilities
  - Table tennis
  - Bouldering
  - Large ball pool
  - Free arcade corner
