= Hatsushima =

Island in Atami, Japan

Coordinates: 35°2′15″N 139°10′10″E

Native name: 初島
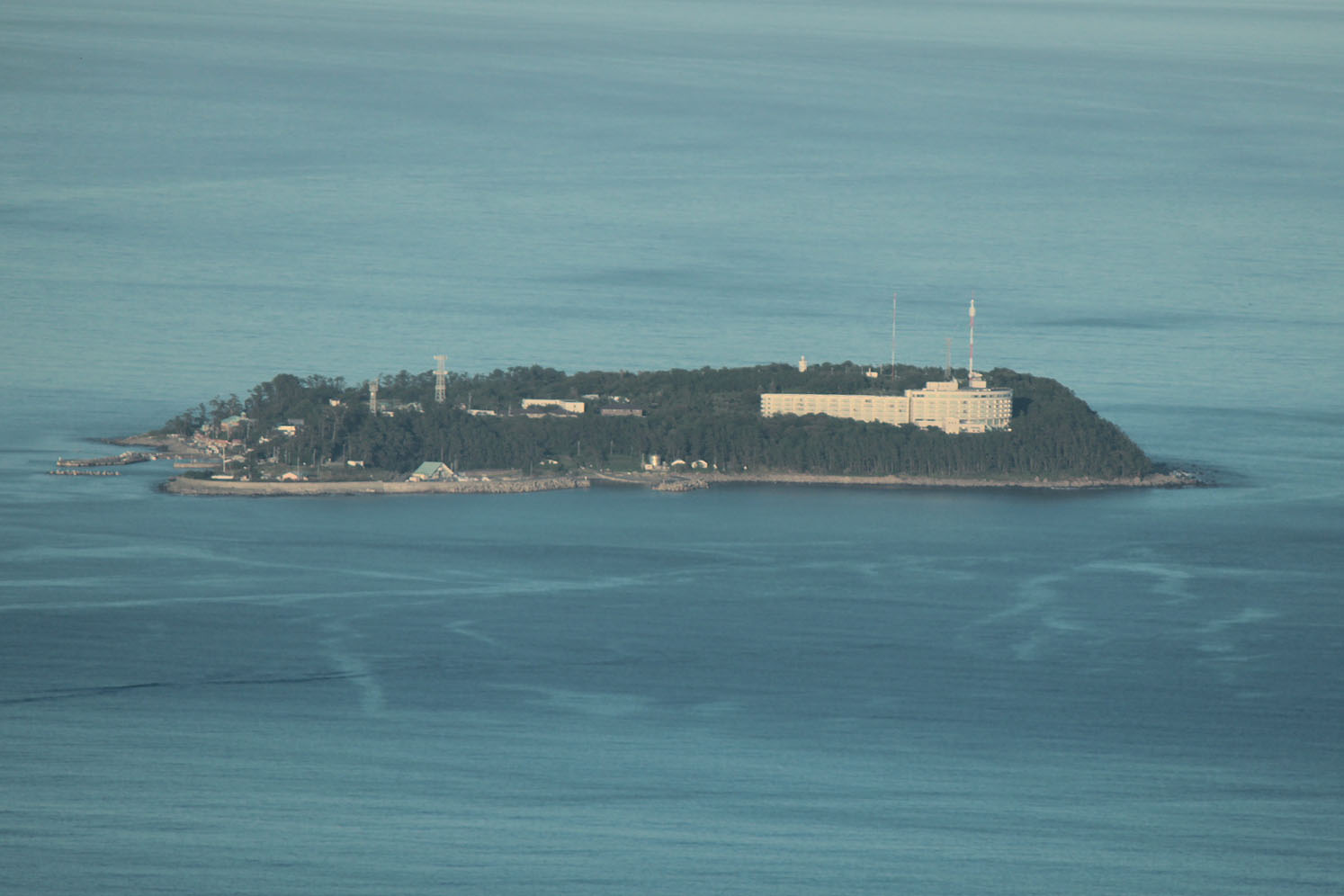

- Location within Japan Location within Shizuoka Prefecture

Geography
- Area: 0.437 km^{2} (0.169 sq mi)
- Coastline: 4 km (2.5 mi)
- Highest elevation: 51 m (167 ft)

Administration
- Japan
- Prefecture: Shizuoka Prefecture
- City: Atami

Demographics
- Population: 215 (29 February 2012)

Additional information
- Official website: https://www.hatsushima.jp/

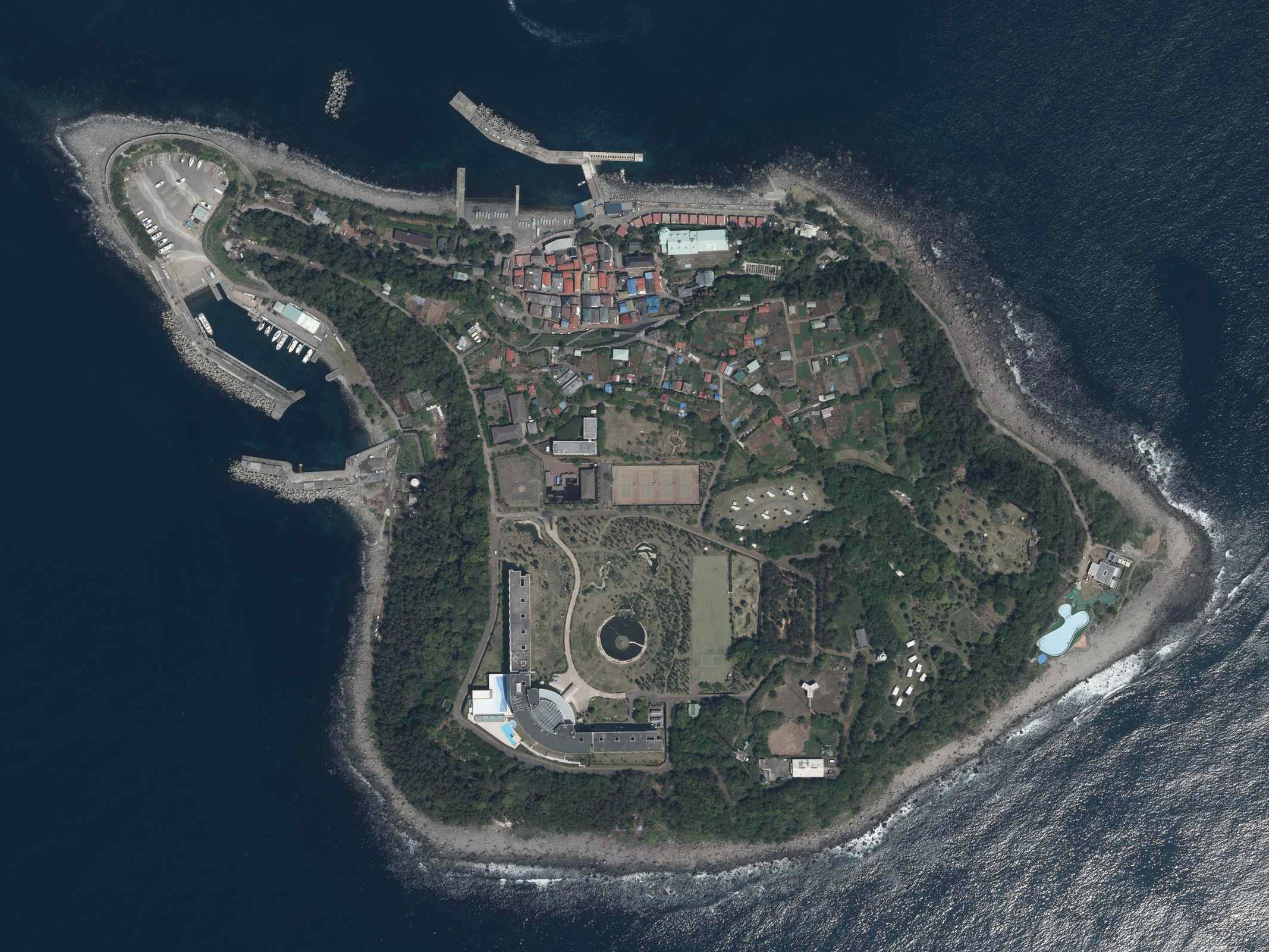
Hatsushima in 2015

Hatsushima (初島) is an island in Sagami Bay, Japan. Administratively, it is part of the city of Atami, Shizuoka Prefecture, from which it can be reached by ferry. The island is approximately 10 kilometers from the ferry landing in downtown Atami. The island is inhabited, with the population mostly residing on the northern side of the island. As of 2018, the island had a population of 193 people in 114 households.

== Geology ==
Hatsushima is located within the caldera forming Atami Bay, and was created by an uplift of the seafloor due to volcanic activity. This uplifting has occurred many times in the island's geological history, as evidenced by the many terraces formed by various uplifts. The elevation of the island is 33.5 metres (110 ft) above sea level, and the island grew in height approximately two meters as a result of the 1923 Great Kantō earthquake.

== History ==
Hatsushima has been inhabited since prehistoric times, and remains from the Jōmon period have been found in the island's interior. It is mentioned in poetry by Minamoto no Sanetomo during the Kamakura period, and per records dated 1351, the island had 18 households. This grew to 41 households by 1830 during the Edo period. In 1913, the future Emperor of Japan Hirohito visited the island to pursue his hobby of marine biology. The writer Akiko Yosano spent several months on the island in 1923, later publishing a diary of her experiences and comments that the culture of the island retained many traditional aspects which had now vanished from the mainland. Tourist development of the island began in 1964 with efforts by the Fuji Kyuko railway to develop hotels, campgrounds and leisure facilities. In the 1980s, during the Japanese asset price bubble an investment group attempted to overcome the island's objections to selling their land by making them shareholders in a venture company which intended to turn most of the island into a self-contained resort; however, the venture went bankrupt in 1999.

== Attractions ==
- Hatsushima Oceanographic Museum "JAMSTEC has a museum on Hatsushima, an island in Sagami Bay. Here we display such things as specimens of deep sea creatures and models of deep sea research vessels. Moreover, JAMSTEC projects that involve Hatsushima, such as the deep sea observation station in waters off Hatsushima and development of diving technologies, are introduced here."
