= Hideo Kojima's unrealized projects =

Unfinished or canceled projects by video game designer Hideo Kojima

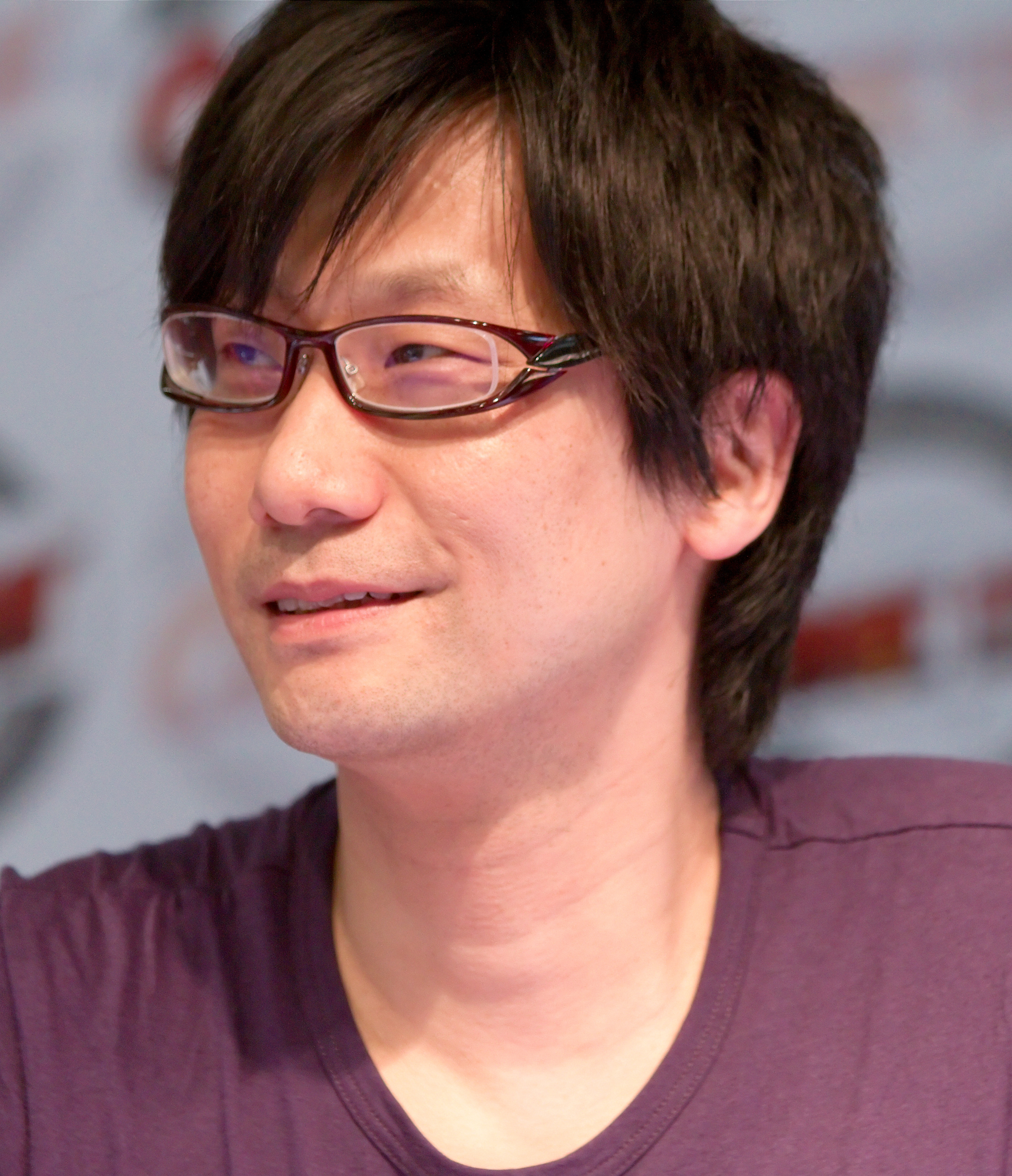
Hideo Kojima at Japan Expo in 2010.

Beginning his career in 1986, Japanese video game director, writer and designer Hideo Kojima has worked on several projects that neither progressed past the conception phase, nor materialized despite being at an advanced stage of development for logistical, financial, and/or creative reasons. Many of the cancelled projects were sourced from the period during which Kojima and his studio Kojima Productions were employed by publisher Konami, whom they were dissociated from following a falling out with senior level staff and an operational restructuring in 2015.

== Konami Computer Entertainment Japan (1986-2004) ==
=== Lost Warld (MSX) ===
After completing his first game Penguin Adventure (1986) for the MSX home computer, Kojima briefly attempted to design a new game titled Lost Warld, its name intended to be a portmanteau of 'war' and 'world'. According to a 2007 interview with Famitsu, a proposal Kojima had drafted in this period garnered "a lot of attention" internally at Konami for its length, and that the game was meant to be an action title taking inspiration from Super Mario Bros. (1985), a game that was cited as a significant influence on Kojima. Players were meant to control a woman named "Jamie" who had to save her newly wedded husband "Fredrick" from the villainous "Mr. Cloudman" when their honeymoon aboard the Titanic was disrupted by the ship crashing into a floating continent, with stages taking place across its regions. The game would've also featured story cutscenes and bonus stages, but the concept proved to be untenable on the MSX's weaker hardware. The cancellation of Lost Warld was attributed towards its ambition and the time to produce the game, with Konami instead reassigning Kojima to another MSX title in development at the company, which under his direction became Metal Gear (1987).

=== Metal Gear 3 (3DO) ===
Following the release of Policenauts in 1994, Kojima began to plan a sequel to Metal Gear 2: Solid Snake (1990) that would've released as a 3D installment on the 3DO. This prospective iteration was teased in two pieces of concept art drawn by Yoji Shinkawa that were included as easter eggs in the demo disc for Policenauts' 3DO port scheduled for 1995. One such artwork featured an earlier depiction of Solid Snake and Meryl Silverburgh, the latter being a character from Policenauts planned to carry over into the game, while another showed an earlier version of the rogue FOXHOUND unit. The game ceased development on the console due to the 3DO's commercial failure and declining publisher support, paired with Kojima's interest in the newer PlayStation console for its superior 3D graphics capabilities, prompting him to restart development on the latter system. The game would eventually release as Metal Gear Solid in 1998, titled as such in part to communicate the shift to 3D polygonal graphics from sprite art, and due to the lack of awareness around either Kojima's Metal Gear or Solid Snake, which hadn't released outside Japan at that time.

=== The Matrix ===
Following the success of The Matrix in 1999, it was rumored that several studios were being courted by The Wachowskis to produce a video game adaptation of the film, with Next Generation Magazine alleging that December that the Metal Gear team at Konami Computer Entertainment Japan were among the frontrunners to helm such a project, including Kojima as director and designer. Christopher Bergstresser, the vice president of licensing at Konami Digital Entertainment at the time, confirmed in 2025 that he and other Konami executives had set up a meeting between the filmmakers and Metal Gear Solid co-producer Kazui Kitaue to broker a deal, with the latter declining. Kojima would later comment on social media, recalling that even as KCEJ's vice president at that time, he had not been aware of such a meeting taking place despite knowing the Wachowskis and attending the film's premiere earlier in the year, but would've likely been unavailable to accept the offer to develop the game at the time due to his preoccupation with Metal Gear Solid 2: Sons of Liberty (2001).

=== 'Raw game' concept ===
In a December 2000 interview for the debut issue of Official PlayStation 2 Magazine-UK, Kojima first expressed interest in developing what he described as a 'raw game', one that could be played indefinitely if the player was precise, but one that would also cease to be playable entirely if they failed to meet a particular condition such as losing a life during gameplay. In May 2005, Kojima was asked by the same publication whether he still intended to produce such a title, to which he affirmed his goal and remarked upon such a game's ability for its players to reconsider their own mortality while playing a 'raw' game, feeling that they aren't able to appreciate the finite nature of life itself in a virtual world with continues and save points. To that end, Kojima had since stated that he incorporated broader concepts from this central idea into titles such as Boktai: The Sun Is in Your Hand (2003) and Metal Gear Solid 3: Snake Eater (2004). In a later 2008 interview with Kikizo, Kojima reiterated that he was still wary about the technical feasibility of creating such a game at that time.

== Konami's Kojima Productions (2005-2015) ==
=== Everyone's Metal Gear ===
In the mid-2000s, Kojima produced a design document for a Metal Gear game on the PlayStation Portable that repurposed ideas from an original title built around the local connectivity features of the console. According to a 2009 blog post, the game would start the player in an empty world that would need to be populated with a mix of in-game characters and other, real-life PSP owners who they could encounter and immediately befriend, also bringing them into the game world in the process. A permadeath system would be present that ensured any characters, be it in-game or an avatar of another player, would remain dead after being killed, and other characters would be added to the game world through the story campaign, finding other players in competitive and cooperative multiplayer, or access points for recruiting additional units. Players would be encouraged to take their PSP consoles outside and link with other PSP owners to add them as troops or operatives in the game world, and to strengthen their relationships with said army by befriending the people connected to them in real life. Kojima had planned to pass this concept to another director and producer within Kojima Productions, as he was busy leading Metal Gear Solid 4: Guns of the Patriots (2008) and overseeing other franchise titles such as Metal Gear Acid (2004). Though the game did not materialize in the capacity described, the recruitment and world building systems eventually became the basis for the PSP title Metal Gear Solid: Portable Ops (2006), which placed heavier emphasis on soldier and resource management.

=== Zombie genre game ===
In 2007, Kojima told Edge his idea for a massively multiplayer online game about zombies that would be set in a town half-populated by the namesake creatures, stating that he wasn't simply interested in the concept of the undead, but rather the process of biting other people to infect them as a gameplay mechanic. Kojima elaborated that players would subscribe to be added to the game world, and would become undead immediately upon getting bitten, at which point they were unable to control their characters and could only continually subscribe to watch them infect other players while manipulating the in-game camera. The only way to rejoin as a player character would be to open a new account, hunt and slay the original infected character to regain control. Kojima insisted that he approached the idea "very seriously" even if it took time to fully realize the concept.

=== The Boss-focused Metal Gear spin-off ===
Kojima expressed on multiple occasions that despite his indifference towards spin-off games, he desired to make a standalone Metal Gear title that focused on The Boss, the antagonist of Metal Gear Solid 3: Snake Eater (2004). He began planning such a title just as Metal Gear Solid 4: Guns of the Patriots was released in 2008, intending for the game to focus primarily on The Boss and her Cobra Unit as the main characters. The project came under trouble due to a lack of experience from the younger developers placed in charge of the game and Kojima's overall reduced involvement, as he would soon prioritize Metal Gear Solid: Peace Walker (2010). After a staff member instead suggested pivoting towards a side-story about Raiden, the team instead agreed to shift towards what was then known as Metal Gear Solid: Rising, another prequel game intended to explore the character between the events of Metal Gear Solid 2: Sons of Liberty (2001) and Guns of the Patriots that was then reconfigured into Metal Gear Rising: Revengeance (2013) under PlatinumGames. In 2011, Kojima divulged details on his plans for a game about The Boss, stating that it would've focused on her leading the Cobra Unit during Operation Overlord in World War II.

=== Zone of the Enders 3 ===
Zone of the Enders 3 was conceived after the release of Metal Gear Solid 4: Guns of the Patriots in 2008, but had not entered production due to the multitude of other projects being developed at that time, with Kojima himself stating in 2010 he expected it to take priority only after the release of Metal Gear Solid: Rising. Hideo Kojima officially announced a new entry in the series, codenamed "Enders Project", at a Japanese event promoting the Zone of the Enders HD Collection in 2012, confirming that it would run on the studio's new Fox Engine developed for Rising and Metal Gear Solid V: Ground Zeroes (2014). In 2013, Kojima confirmed on his radio show that the project was no longer moving forward and that the team had been disbanded due to the mediocre reception to the HD Collection the previous year, but nevertheless hoped that fan interest could rejuvenate work on the game in the future. The game appeared to be finally shelved as Kojima Productions was closed by Konami in 2015 following the release of Metal Gear Solid V: The Phantom Pain (2015), ending Kojima's own involvement with the franchise.

=== Silent Hills ===
Silent Hills was planned to be the eighth game in the Silent Hill franchise, and the first to be created by Hideo Kojima. Along with Guillermo del Toro, Kojima was to direct the game as well as be the lead gameplay designer. A playable teaser for Silent Hills, P.T., was released on August 12, 2014 to critical acclaim before being delisted on April 29, 2015 with Silent Hills being officially canceled 2 days earlier.

== Independent studio (2015-present) ==
=== Untitled superhero film ===
In a series of posts in 2022, Hideo Kojima shared that he had once planned a dark superhero film about a human detective fighting corrupted celebrity antiheroes as a black comedy satire of such fiction's popularity in the entertainment industry. Despite envisioning Mads Mikkelsen portraying the lead character, which would've re-teamed him with Kojima following their work on the game Death Stranding (2019), he confessed to shelving the project, feeling it was too similar structurally to the Amazon Prime Video series The Boys (2019-2026), despite claiming his idea would've been tonally and aesthetically different from the latter.

== See also ==
- Kojima Productions games
- List of Metal Gear media
