= Kamenose landslide =

Landslide in Japan

The Kamenose Landslide (Japanese: 亀の背地すべり, Kamenose Jisuberi) is a historically significant and geologically active landslide located in Osaka Prefecture, Japan, along the Yamato River basin. Known for its recurring mass movements and complex geological structure, the Kamenose Landslide has posed a persistent threat to local communities, transportation routes, and infrastructure for centuries.

== Geography and Location ==
The Kamenose Landslide is situated in the eastern part of Osaka Prefecture, near the boundary with Nara Prefecture, along the foothills of the Ikoma Mountains. The geology of the Kamenose area is complex and comprises primarily alternating layers of sandstone and mudstone, along with weathered granite and volcanic deposits. The presence of clay-rich layers (acting as slip surfaces) and fractured rock strata due to tectonic movements makes the area highly susceptible to landslides.

== History ==
The Kamenose Landslide was documented as early as the Edo period (1603–1868). Historical records indicate that large-scale landslides frequently blocked the Yamato River, causing temporary damming and flooding upstream. Some of the most notable landslide events include:

1932: Landslide caused river damming and collapse of railroad. 1953: (Kii Peninsula Flood Disaster): Heavy rainfall caused widespread landslides, including reactivation of the Kamenose Landslide, severely impacting railway lines and roads.

== Engineering countermeasures ==
In response to recurring landslides, extensive engineering works have been implemented to stabilize the Kamenose slope. Despite these measures, continuous monitoring is necessary, as the slope remains active, especially during heavy rainfall events and earthquakes.

== See also ==
- Kurashita landslide
